= Congressional office buildings =

Office building used by the US Congress

Coordinates: 38°53′23″N 77°00′23″W

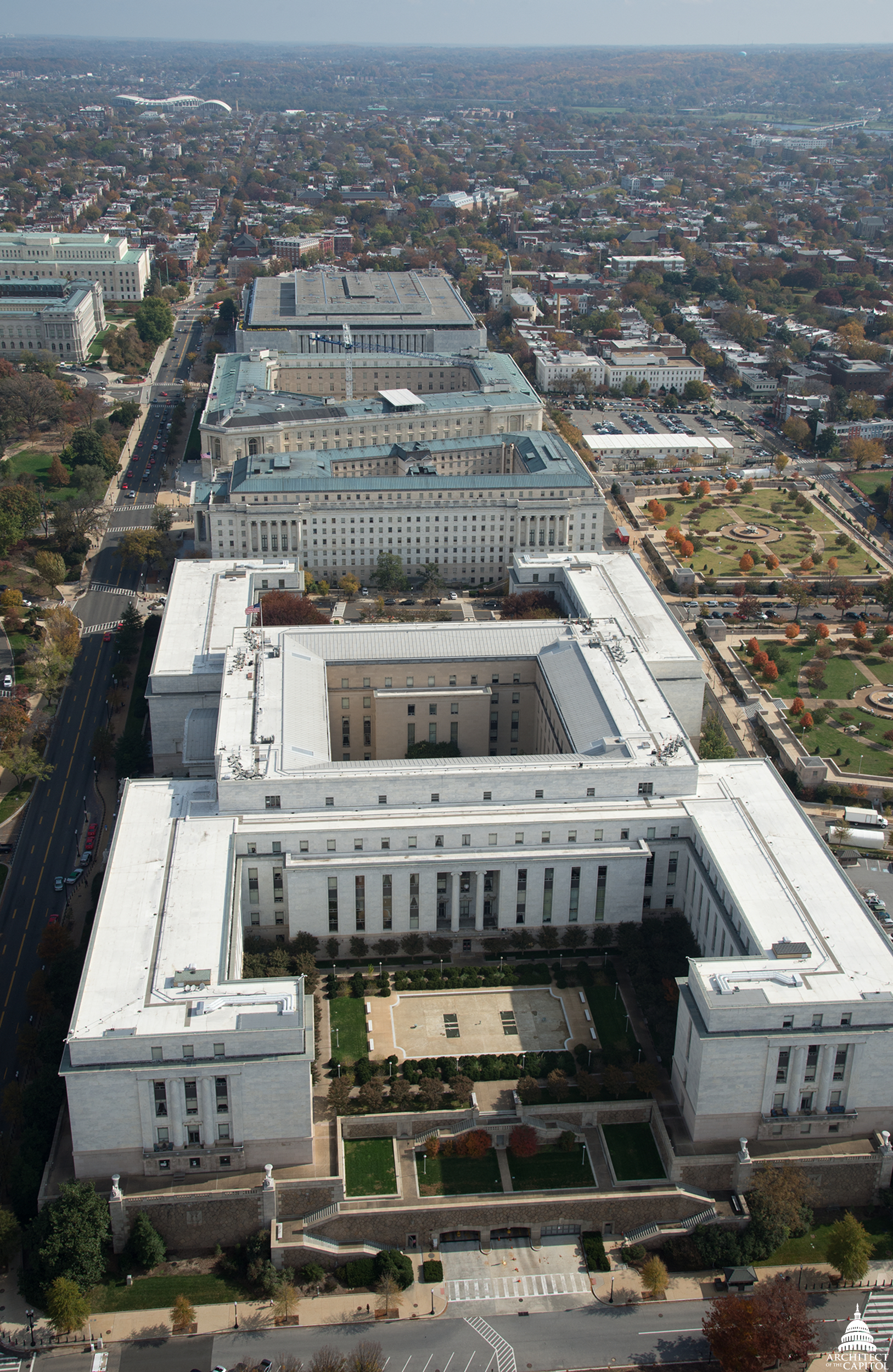
Aerial view of House of Representatives office buildings complex, looking east on the south side of the U.S. Capitol. Front to back: Rayburn Building (1962-1965), Longworth Building (1930-1933), and the Cannon Building (1904-1908). Further east and behind the Cannon Building is the James Madison Memorial Building (built 1971-1980, part of the adjacent Library of Congress complex) (2015)

The congressional office buildings are the office buildings used by the United States Congress to augment the space in the United States Capitol. The congressional office buildings are part of the Capitol Complex, and are thus under the authority of the Architect of the Capitol and protected by the United States Capitol Police. The office buildings house the individual offices of each U.S. Representative and Senator as well as committee hearing rooms, staff rooms, multiple cafeterias, and areas for support, committee, and maintenance staff.

The congressional office buildings are connected to the Capitol by means of underground pedestrian tunnels, some of which are equipped with small railcars shuttling users to and from the Capitol, which together form the Capitol subway system.

Congressional pages are responsible for carrying packages and messages from the two chambers to the buildings. The House of Representatives pages program was discontinued because of some scandals after 180 years in 2011, but the Senate pages system still continues.

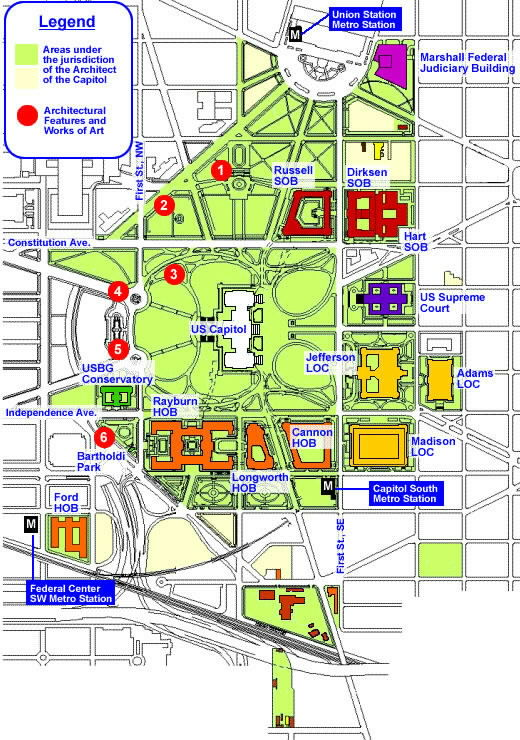
Map of the United States Capitol Complex

The three Senate office buildings are along Constitution Avenue north of the Capitol:

- Russell Senate Office Building (RSOB), (built 1903-1908, opened in 1909), named after Senator Richard Russell Jr. (1897-1971), of Georgia in 1972.
- Dirksen Senate Office Building (DSOB, (built 1956-1958, opened in 1958), Originally known as the new Senate Office Building, renamed later after Senator (and longtime majority / minority leader) Everett Dirksen (1896-1969), of Illinois
- Hart Senate Office Building (HSOB, (built 1971-1980, completed 1982), named for Senator Philip A. Hart (1912-1976) of Michigan

The three major House of Representatives office buildings are along Independence Avenue on the southside of the Capitol:

- Cannon House Office Building (CHOB, built 1904-1908, dedicated 1908), named after longtime Speaker of the House Joseph Cannon (1836-1926),
- Longworth House Office Building (LHOB, (built 1930-1933, dedicated 1933), named after Speaker Nicholas Longworth (1869-1931), of Ohio
- Rayburn House Office Building (RHOB, built 1962-1965, dedicated 1965), named after Speaker of the House Sam Rayburn (1882-1961), of Texas, and is the largest House offices structure.

A fourth building, the Ford House Office Building, was recently named for the 38th President Gerald R. Ford (1913-2006). The building was built 1939, by the Works Progress Administration (W.P.A.) of the New Deal program during the Great Depression under the Roosevelt administration. It was formerly used to house the U.S. Bureau of the Census (part of the U.S. Department of Commerce), and was then occupied by the Federal Bureau of Investigation (FBI)'s fingerprint records. The Ford building sits a few blocks further southwest of the others and the Capitol. Because it was previously named as House Annex-2, it currently houses additional committee staff and administrative offices.

A fifth building for House of Representatives staff, the O'Neill House Office Building (previously known as the "House Annex-1") was named after former Speaker of the House Thomas "Tip" O'Neill (1912-1994), of Massachusetts. The building was demolished in 2002. However, in 2008, Federal Office Building No. 8 (formerly the headquarters of the U.S. Food and Drug Administration) was renovated, being renamed the replacement O'Neill House Office Building in 2012. The building was transferred from the operations of the federal government's General Services Administration to the office of the Architect of the Capitol in 2017. It currently houses both House administrative staff as well as some offices shared with the U.S. Department of Health and Human Services.

The U.S. Capitol Complex also includes a Daniel Webster Senate Page Residence dormitory, northeast of the Capitol near the Hart Building for those pages of the program for the Senate. The similar companion House of Representatives page program was discontinued in 2011 after 180 years, because of some controversial scandals. There is also a Capitol Power Plant, on the House / southside of the Capitol.

== See also ==
- Congressional office lottery
- House Office Building Commission
