= House Office Building Commission =

Entity in the U.S. House of Representatives

The House Office Building Commission is an entity within the House of Representatives of the United States that oversees the various functions of the House and its office buildings. These buildings are part of the overall United States Capitol Complex and house the offices of Members of Congress, the Committees of the House, garages, cafeterias, a power plant and a dorm for Congressional pages, among many others that serve various functions.

The Commission oversees the operations of these buildings and from time to time issues regulations. While the Superintendent of the House and the Architect of the Capitol handle the day-to-day operations, rules and regulations must be approved by the Commission.

It is composed of the Speaker of the United States House of Representatives and two other members of Congress, generally the House Majority Leader and the House Minority Leader.

From the House Rules Manual:

"The commission also issues regulations governing the House Congressional office buildings, House garages, and the Capitol Power Plant (see regulations promulgated December, 1995). The commission is composed of the Speaker and two Members of the House (traditionally the Majority and Minority Leaders) (40 U.S.C. 175)."

Recently the HOBC approved a new policy related to the hallways in House Office Buildings: Previously, offices were allowed to set out displays, in particular pictures of troops killed in battle in Iraq and Afghanistan, but also things like debt clocks and indications of levels of deficits.

The new policy prohibits such displays. The role of the HOBC was to approve a policy proposed by the Architect of the Capitol and recommended by various other agencies, such as the Committee on House Administration of the House.
