= United States Capitol subway system =

Subway system in Washington, DC

Coordinates: 38°53′23″N 77°0′32″W

Overview
- Owner: U.S. federal government
- Locale: United States Capitol Complex, Washington, D.C., US
- Transit type: People mover
- Number of lines: 3
- Number of stations: 6

Operation
- Began operation: March 7, 1909
- Operator: Architect of the Capitol
- Number of vehicles: 7

The subway system of the United States Capitol Complex in Washington, D.C., consists of three underground electric people mover systems that connect the United States Capitol to several congressional office buildings – all of the Senate buildings and one of the House buildings.

== History ==
The original subway line was built in 1909 to link the Russell Senate Office Building to the Capitol. In 1960, an operator-controlled monorail was installed for the Dirksen Senate Office Building. A two-car subway line connecting the Rayburn House Office Building to the Capitol was built in 1965. The Dirksen monorail, which had been extended to the Hart Senate Office Building in 1982, was replaced in 1993 by an automatic train.

== Network ==
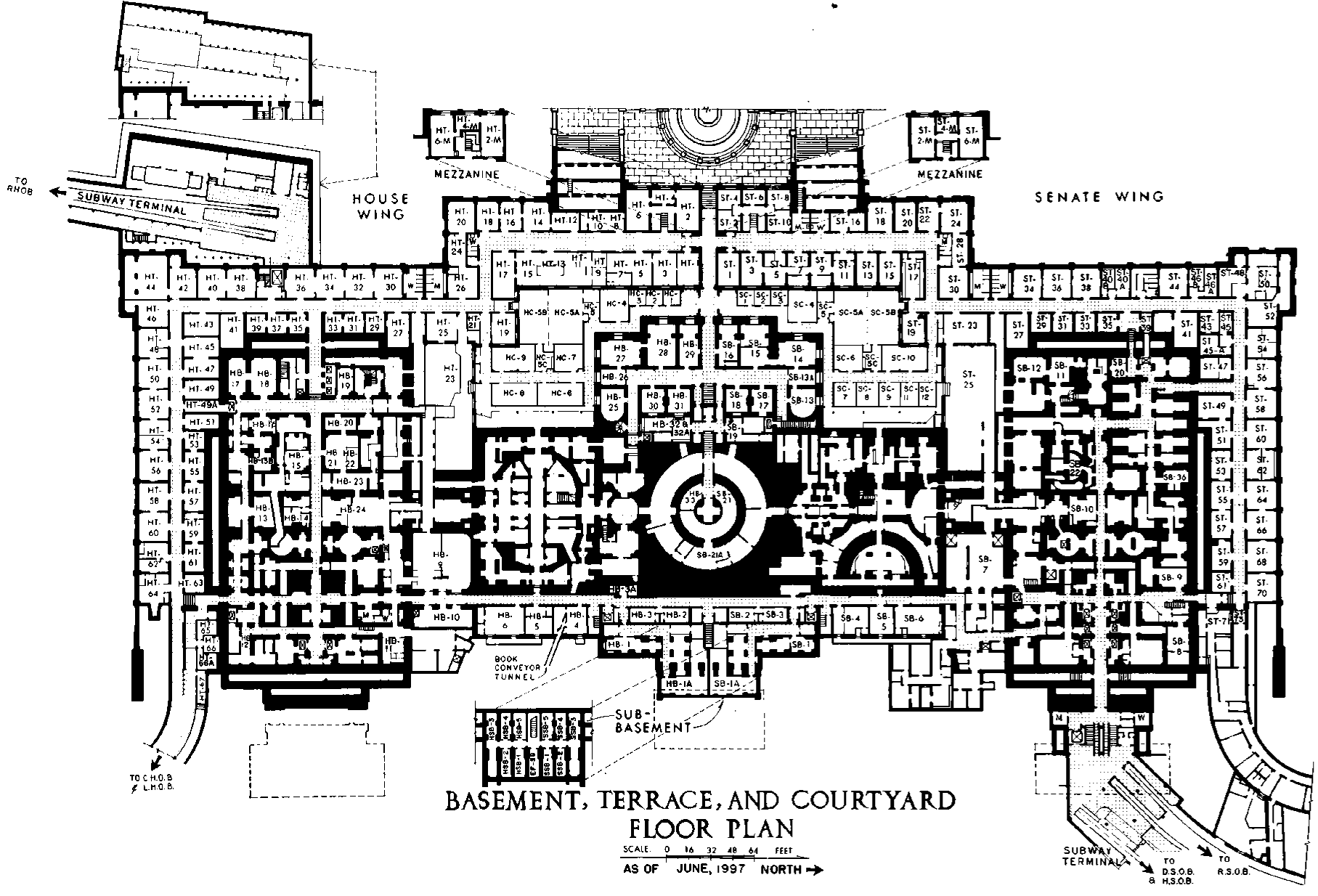
Capitol basement floor plan. Senate subway terminals are on the bottom right, the Rayburn subway terminal is on the top left, underground walkways to House offices are at bottom left

On the Senate side, two separate subway lines exist. The first is a crewed two-track system, with a single open-topped car operating on each track, connecting the Russell Senate Office Building and the Capitol. The other is a computer-controlled system with three enclosed trains of three cars each running on a 90-second schedule, connecting the Hart Senate Office Building, the Dirksen Senate Office Building, and the Capitol. The train cars are unpowered; the train is propelled by a track-side linear motor. This line has two parallel tracks for most of its length, but at the Hart and Capitol stations the tracks converge into one, with a single side platform. This allows easy return travel on the opposite track. The Dirksen station features a side platform for Capitol-bound trains and an island platform for Hart-bound trains. All three of these stations feature platform screen doors. A small maintenance spur is located adjacent to the Hart station.

On the House side, an older, crewed two-track system, with a single open-topped car operating on each track, shuttles passengers between the Rayburn House Office Building and the Capitol. The remaining four House office buildings are not serviced by the subway system; two (Cannon and Longworth) use a shared underground footpath tunnel while the other two (Ford and O'Neill) have no underground connection to the capitol.

The House and Senate subway systems do not terminate in the same location under the Capitol, but they are connected by a labyrinth of tunnels.

== Security ==
U.S. Capitol Subway between the U.S. Capitol Building and the Dirksen Senate Office Building

The public can travel on the trains — usually during a tour of the Capitol Complex — but must be escorted by a staff member with proper identification. During votes, the House subway is restricted to congressional members. The Russell subway is restricted to members and staff during Senate votes.

Since the terrorist attacks of September 11, 2001, restrictions have been placed on visitors using the Senate subway between the Hart and Dirksen buildings.

=== 1947 shooting ===
Senator John W. Bricker was shot at as he entered the Capitol subway tunnel by former Capitol Police officer William Louis Kaiser on July 12, 1947. Bricker survived as the shots did not hit him.

=== 2007 collision ===
A collision occurred on October 2, 2007, in the Rayburn to Capitol subway line after a car failed to slow down when it reached the end of the track line. The operator was injured and taken to a hospital for observation.

== Image gallery ==
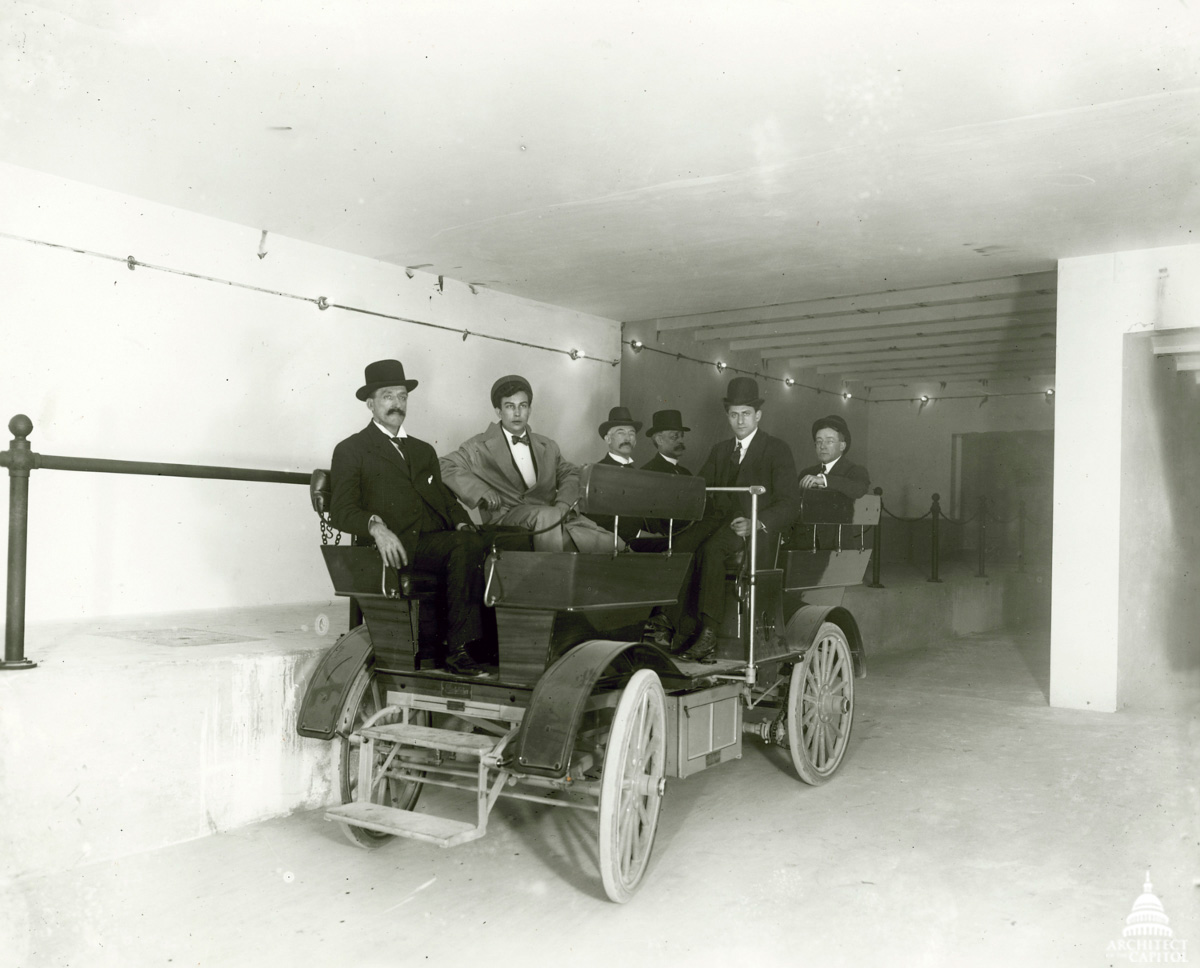
Studebaker Electric subway car in 1909

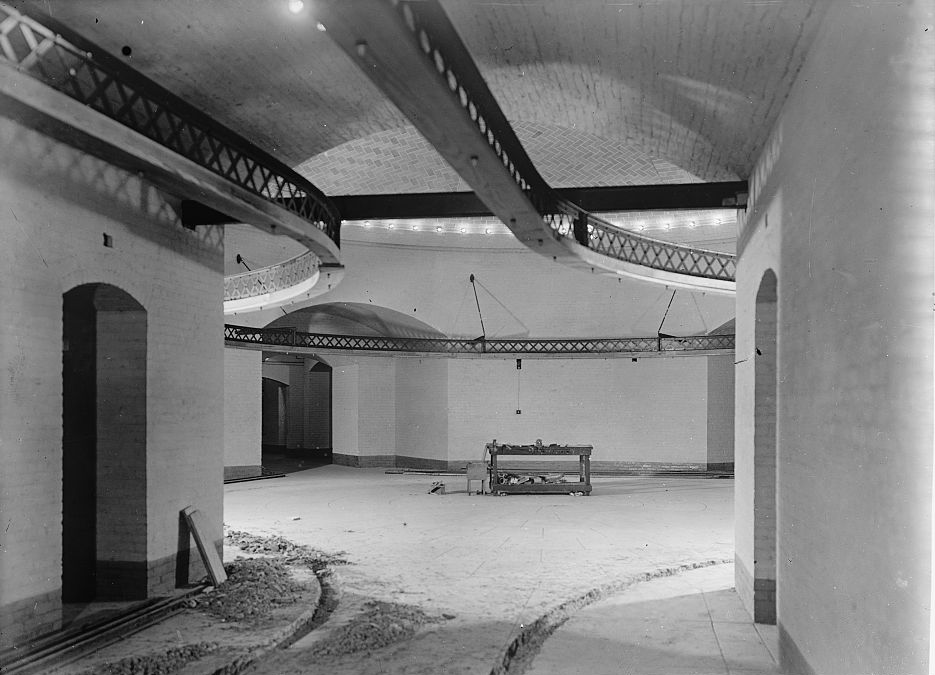
Installing a monorail in 1912

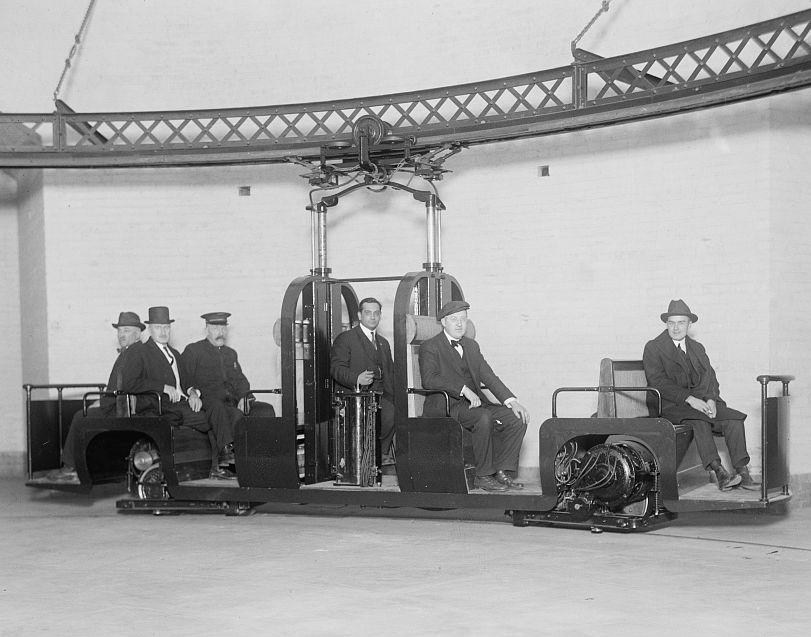
Monorail car in 1912

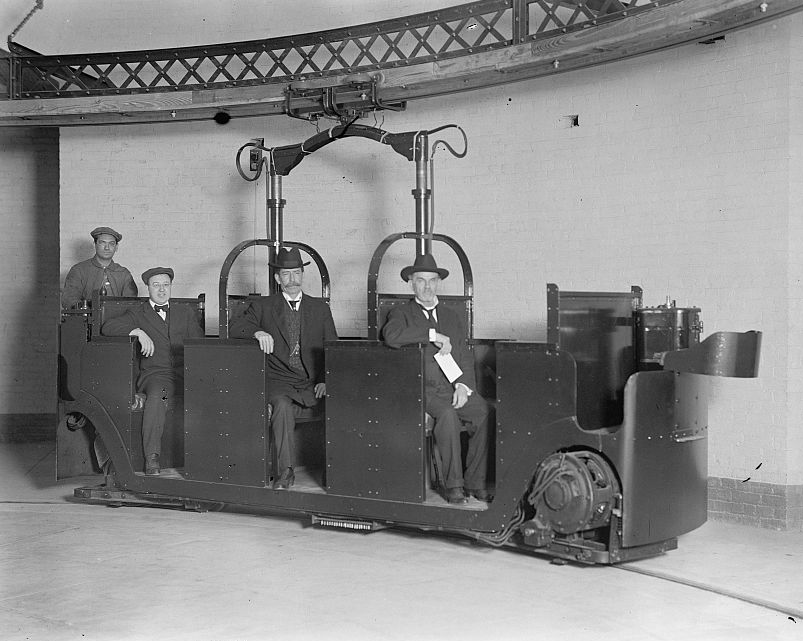
Monorail car in 1912

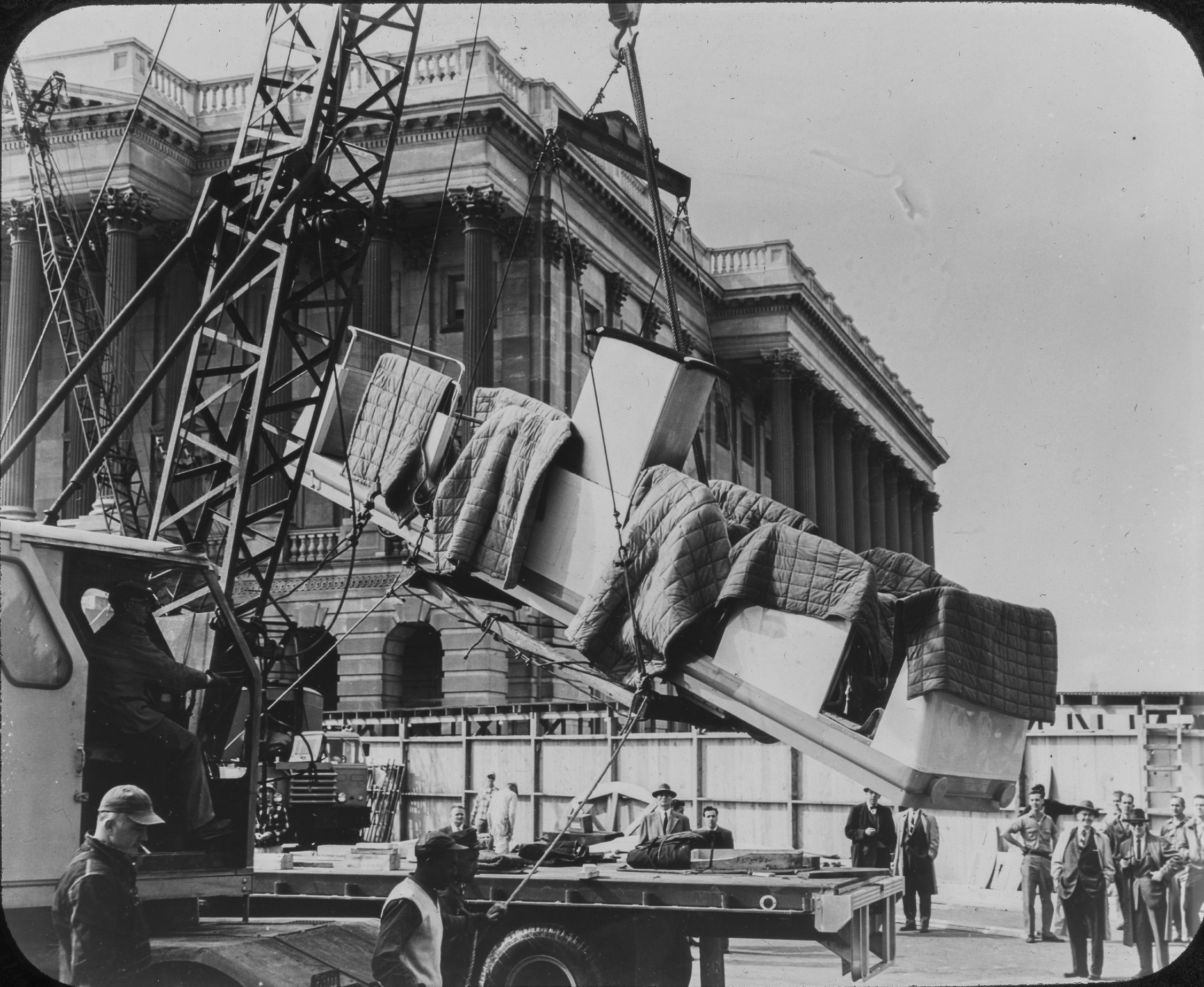
Installation of a new subway car sometime between 1958 and 1961

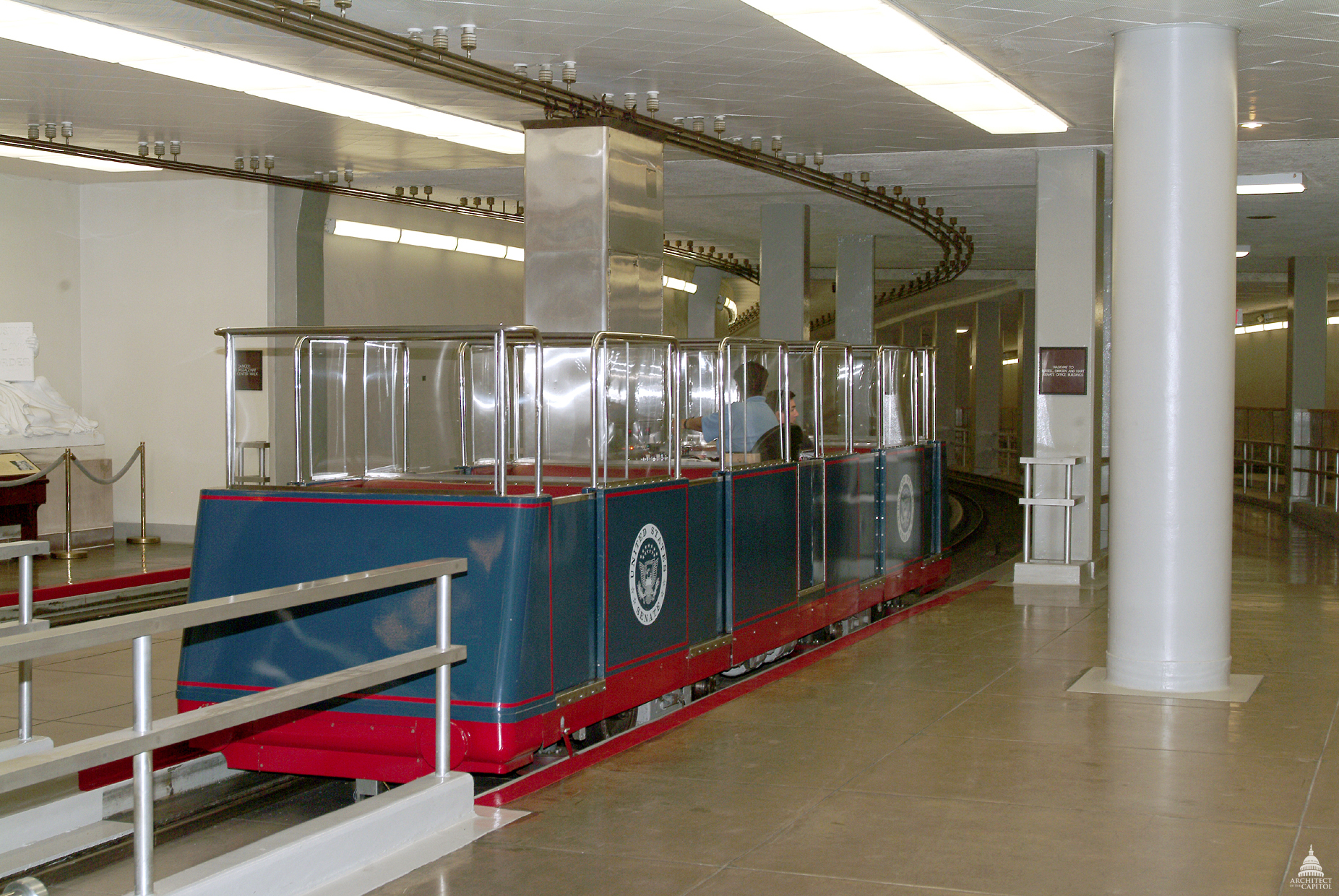
Subway car traveling to the Russell Senate Office Building in 2003

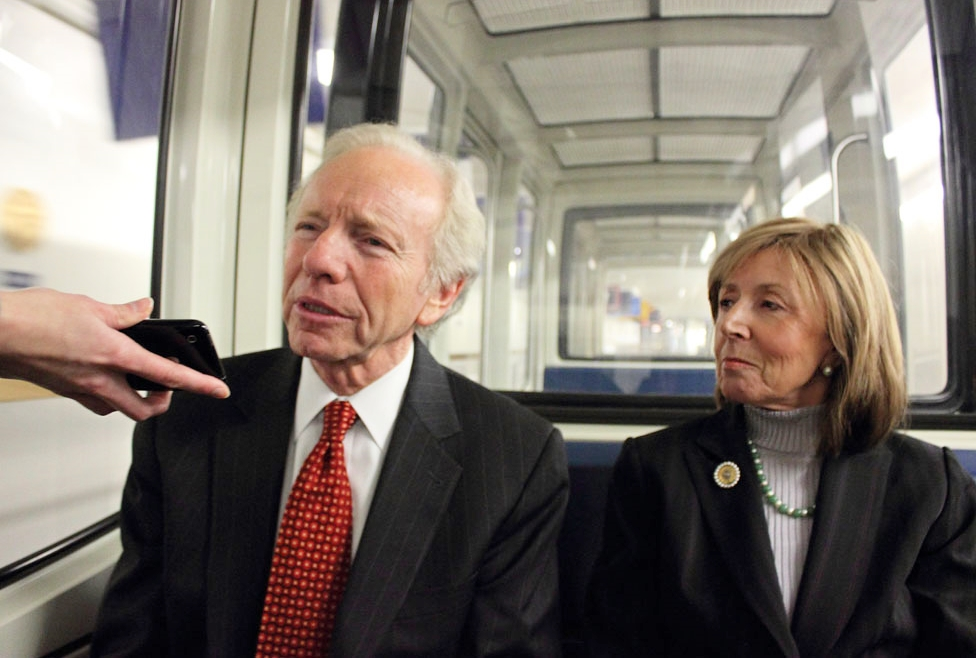
Senator Joe Lieberman rides the subway to the Capitol with his wife Hadassah in 2011

== Rolling stock ==
Current cars:

- Four open car sets with seating for 18 and separate cab for operator; two sets for the House and two sets for the Senate
- Three enclosed, unpowered car sets with seating for 36; automated cars

Retired cars:

- Studebaker Company built electric coach cars c. 1909 from Russell line
- Two electric monorail cars c. 1912
- Two electric monorail cars c. 1915 and 1920 replacing 1912 cars and retired 1961; built by Columbia Construction Company at Washington Naval Yard
- Dirksen line electric monorail c. 1960 retired 1993 and replaced with enclosed monorail cars

== See also ==
- Metro-2
- Washington Metro
