= Bartholdi Park =

Park in Washington, D.C., U.S.

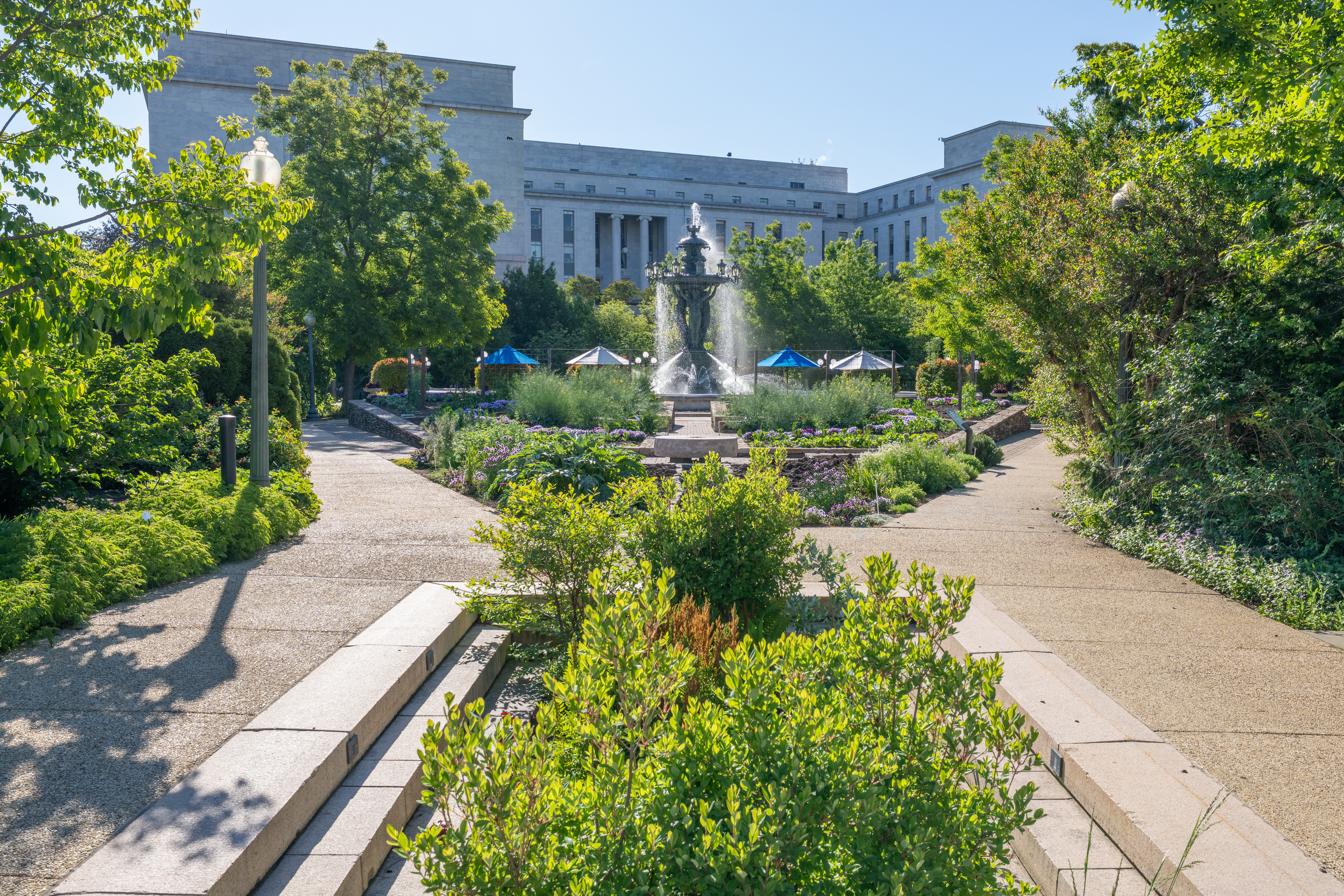
- Bartholdi Park, Capitol Hill

- Location within Washington, D.C.
- Location: Washington, D.C.
- Coordinates: 38°53′17″N 77°00′47″W
- Area: 2 acres (0.81 ha)
- Created: 1932
- Operator: Congress through the Architect of the Capitol
- Website: www.usbg.gov/bartholdi-park

Bartholdi Park is a public park named after French sculptor Frédéric Auguste Bartholdi, who is known primarily for designing the Statue of Liberty. It is located at the corner of Independence Avenue and Washington Avenue. Bartholdi Park is part of the United States Botanic Garden located on the grounds of the United States Capitol.

== History ==
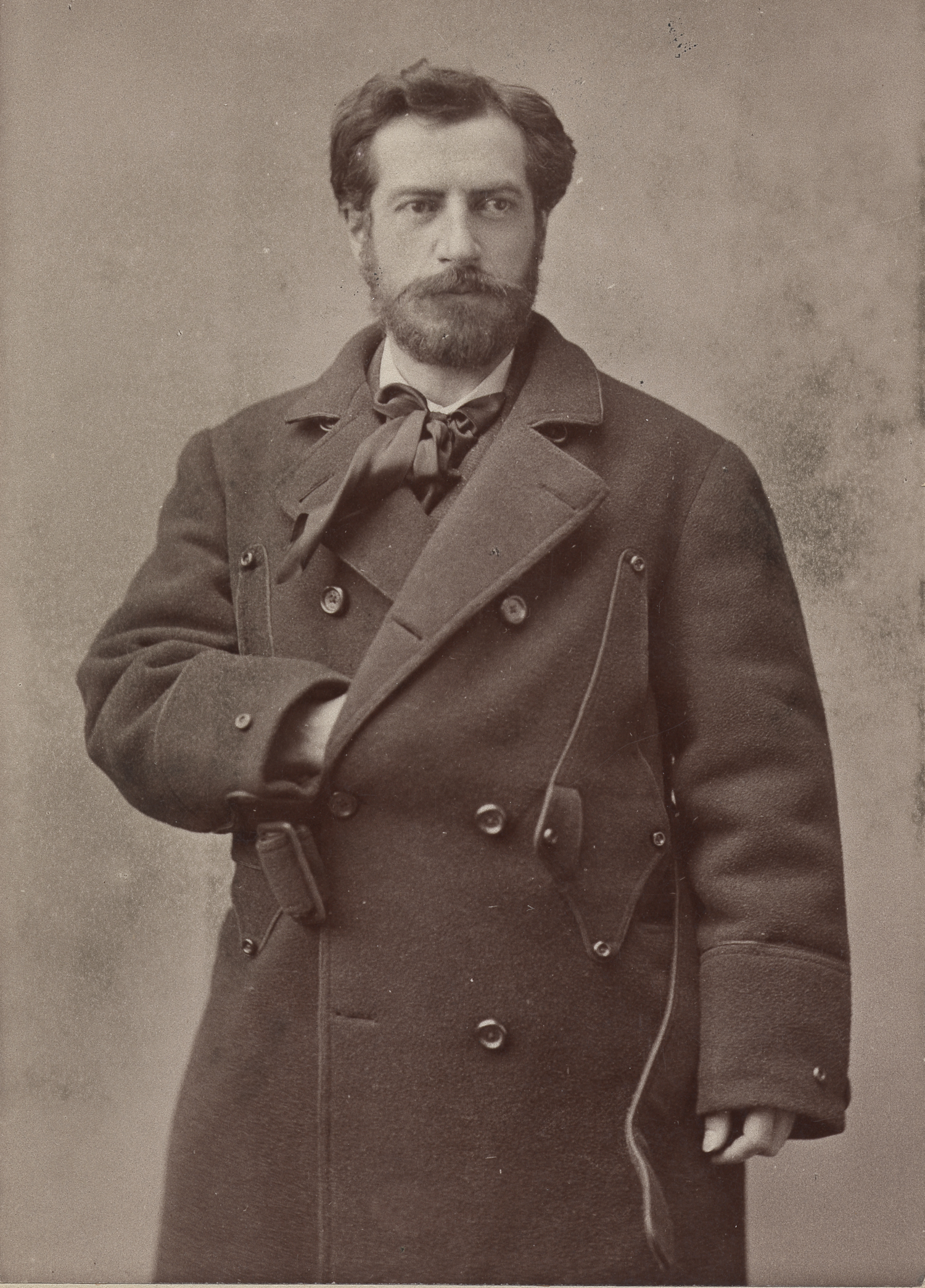
Frédéric Auguste Bartholdi, the park's namesake

Bartholdi Park was created as an exclave of the United States Botanic Garden in 1932, following the garden's move from their original location at the base of the Capitol in 1927. Originally created as a showcase for American horticulture, the park has continued this purpose to this day. While once having its beds planted in a formal, classical style to facilitate public gatherings, the gardens have been continually redesigned to reflect modern American horticulture and to allow the addition of new plants. In 1985, the park was renamed Bartholdi Park, after Frédéric Auguste Bartholdi, the sculptor of the Bartholdi fountain in the center of the park. Recently the park has begun a redesign to become a part of the Sustainable Sites Initiative pilot project. This will include the addition of a demonstration garden for homeowners that will have a focus on creating self sustainable self-sustaining gardens.

== Bartholdi Fountain ==
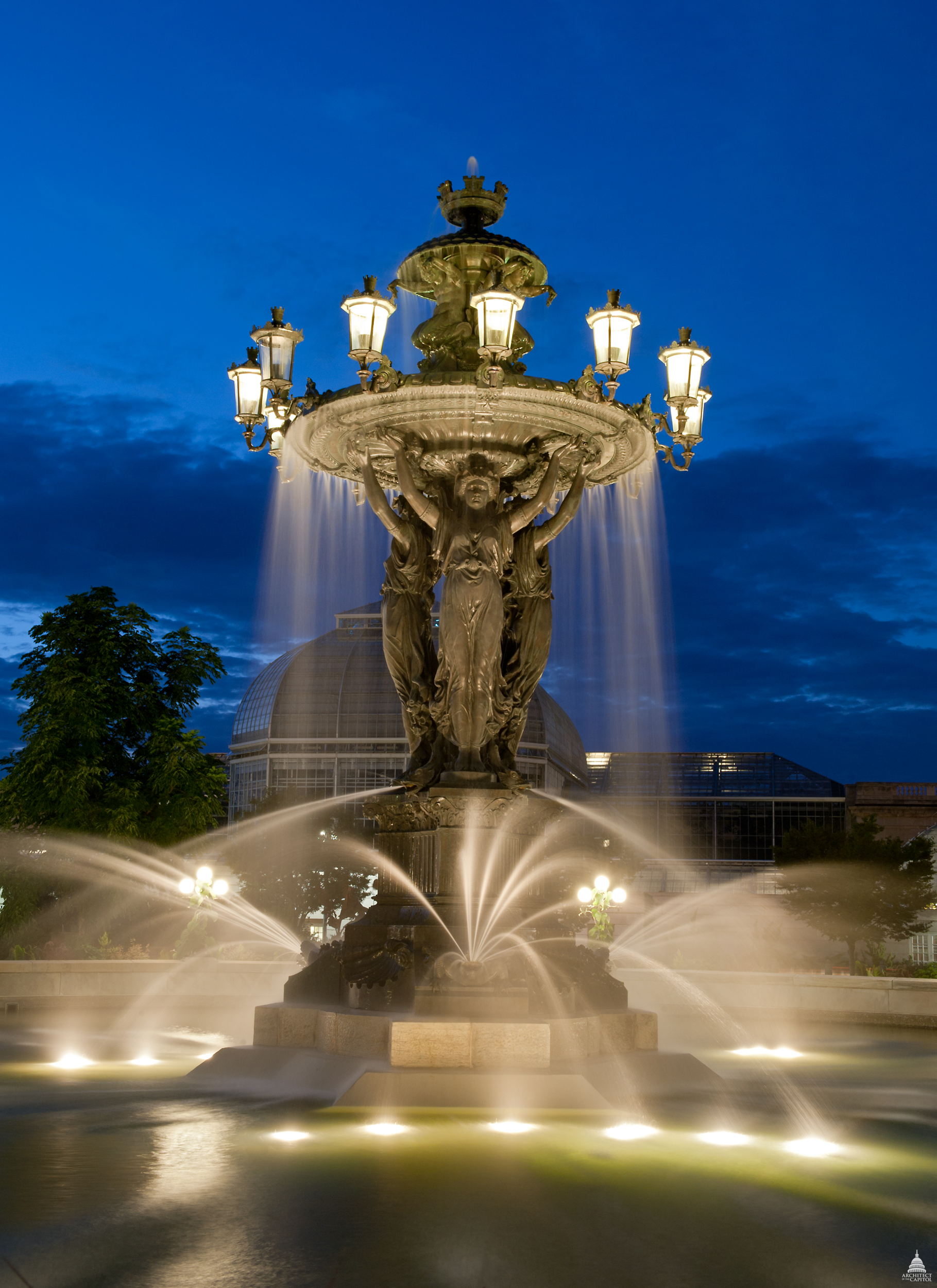
The Bartholdi Fountain

The centerpiece of the park, the Bartholdi fountain, was originally purchased by the United States government for $6,000 in 1877. Previously, the fountain had stood at Fairmount Park during the 1876 Centennial Exposition in Philadelphia. After its purchase, it was placed at the base of Capitol Hill until 1926. Following six years in storage after being removed from Capitol Hill, the fountain was moved to its current location in Bartholdi Park in 1932. In 2008 the fountain was temporarily removed from the park by the Architect of the Capitol for a complete restoration to repair deterioration of the cast iron and bronze coating, add modern pumps and motors, and install a new water treatment and filtration system. The fountain was returned to the park in spring of 2011. The fountain is 30 feet tall and weighs 15 tons and features three 11 feet tall nymphs holding the upper basin. Other decorations include turtles, cherubs, frogs, fish, as well as twelve electric lamps.

== Flora ==
A partial listing of the currently showcased plants at the park includes:

- Echinacea paradoxa Yellow coneflower
- Gelsemium sempervirens Carolina jessamine
- Paeonia obovata Japanese woodland peony
- Loropetalum chinense 'Red Form' fringe flower
- Bergenia cordifolia Pigsqueak plant
- Helleborus × hybridus Lenten rose
- Hamamelis × intermedia 'Barmstedt Gold' Witchhazel
- Hydrangea quercifolia Alice oakleaf hydrangea
- Yucca treculeana Spanish dagger
- Anemone 'Honorine Jobert' Japanese Anemone
- Asclepias curassavica 'Silky Gold' Gold Butterfly Weed
