= United States Capitol Complex =

Government buildings of the US

Coordinates: 38°53′27″N 77°00′26″W

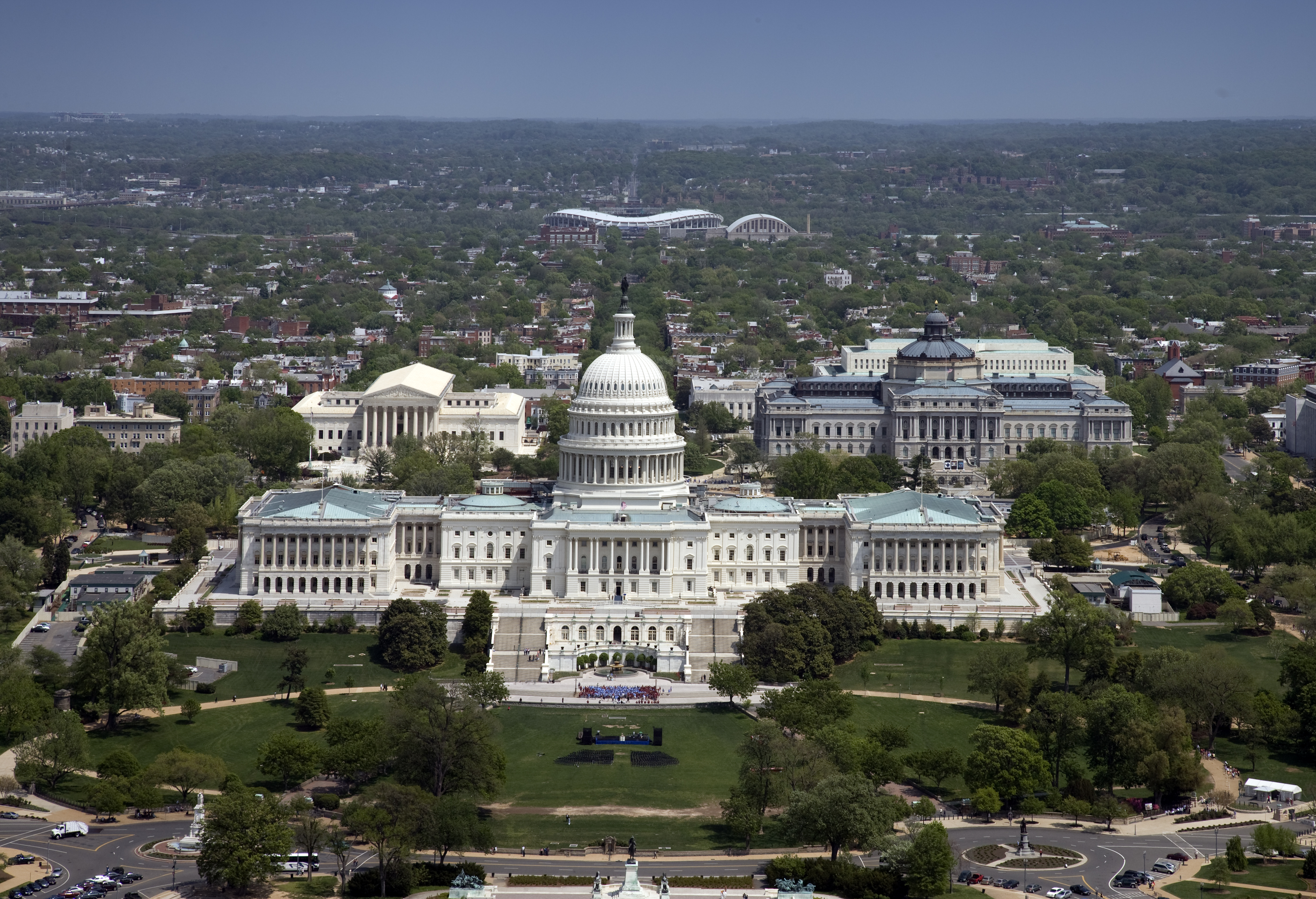
- Aerial view of the central portion of the United States Capitol Complex looking east (2007)
- Interactive map of the United States Capitol Complex area

Website
- www.aoc.gov/explore-capitol-campus www.capitol.gov

The United States Capitol Complex is a group of twenty buildings, grounds, and facilities in Washington, D.C., that are used by the United States Congress, and federal courts. The buildings and grounds within the complex are managed and supervised by the Architect of the Capitol.

== Buildings and grounds ==
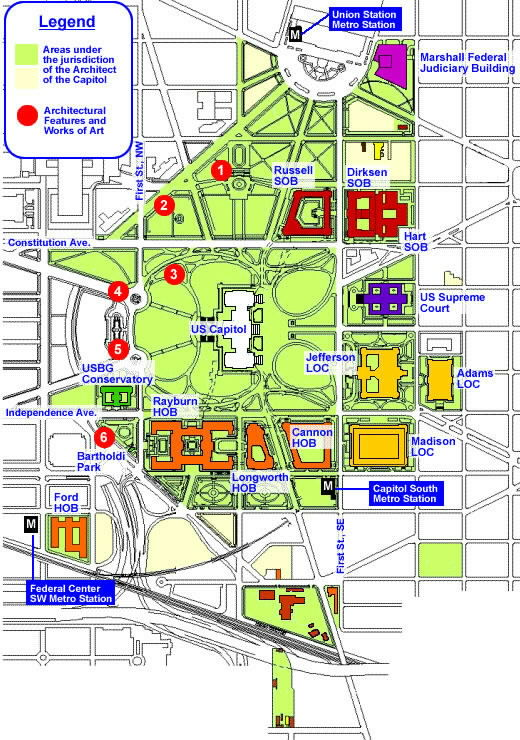
Map of the United States Capitol Complex

The Capitol Building is the central feature of the complex. Other parts of the Capitol Complex include:

I. United States Congress

- House of Representatives Office Buildings
  - Cannon House Office Building
  - Ford House Office Building
  - Longworth House Office Building
  - O'Neill House Office Building
  - Rayburn House Office Building
- Senate Office Buildings
  - Dirksen Senate Office Building
  - Hart Senate Office Building
  - Russell Senate Office Building
  - Daniel Webster Senate Page Residence
- Library of Congress Buildings
  - John Adams Building
  - Thomas Jefferson Building
  - James Madison Memorial Building
- Parks
  - Upper Senate Park
  - Lower Senate Park
  - Spirit of Justice Park
  - Bartholdi Park
- United States Botanic Garden
- Capitol Power Plant
- Capitol Visitor Center
- The Capitol Grounds

II. United States Courts Buildings

- Supreme Court Building
  - Thurgood Marshall Federal Judiciary Building

In addition to the buildings listed above, several monuments, sculptures, and other works of art are located in and around the Capitol Complex. These include the National Statuary Hall Collection and the Statue of Freedom among many others.

The westernmost part of the grounds is the Capitol Reflecting Pool, which reflects the Capitol and the Ulysses S. Grant Memorial.

With the exception of the Ford and O'Neill House Office Buildings, all House and Senate office buildings within the Capitol Complex are linked to the Capitol via an underground network of people movers or footpath tunnels.

== History ==
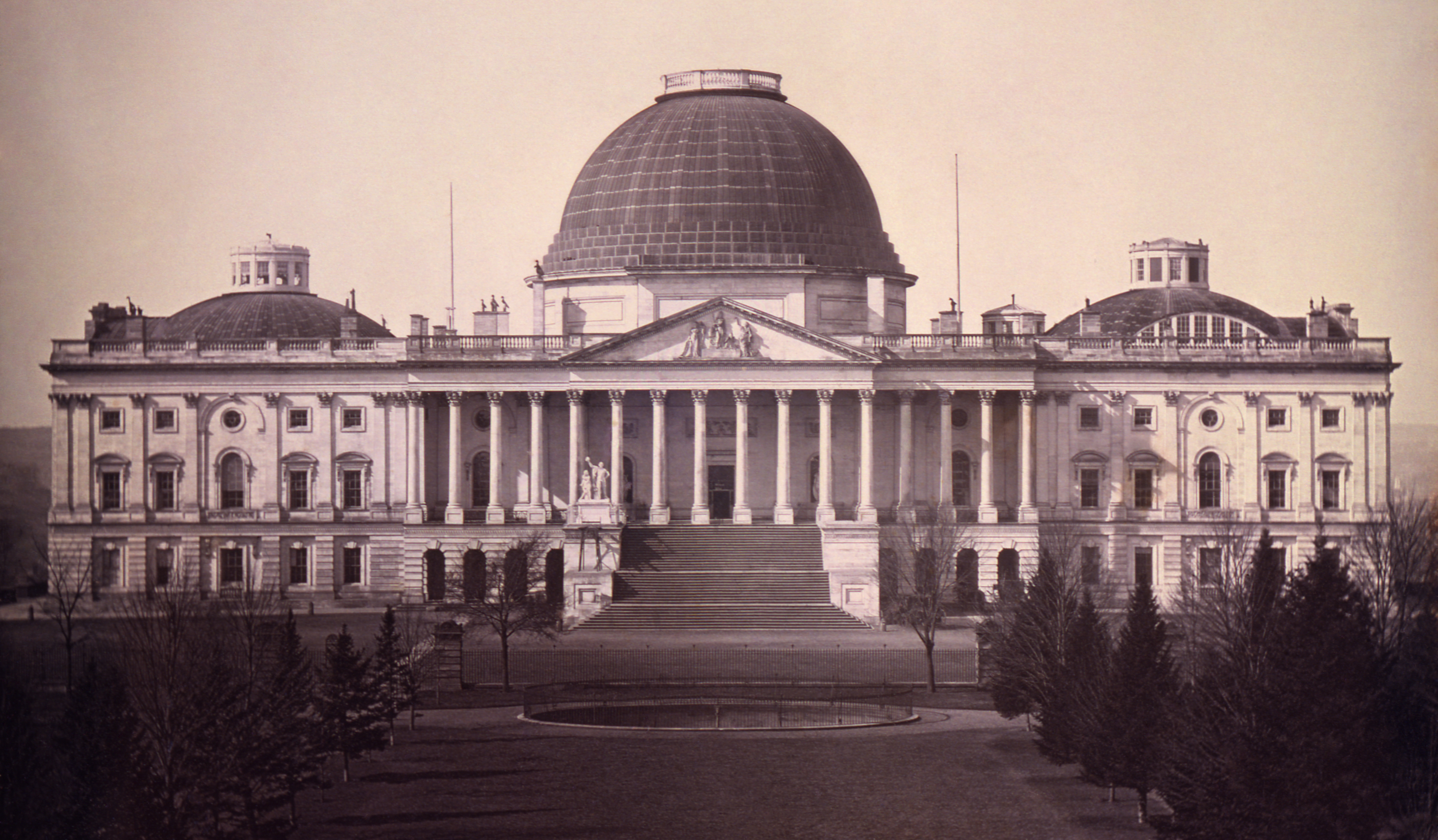
Daguerreotype of the Capitol, c. 1846

Construction of the Capitol began in 1792. When built, it was the only existing building for the use by the nation's legislature. In addition to Congress, the building was also designed to house the Library of Congress, the Supreme Court, the district courts, and other offices.

Following the completion of the building and as the nation grew, so did the size of the Congress. The Capitol and its grounds were enlarged accordingly, and by 1892 the building had reached essentially its present size and appearance (with the exception of the east front extension 1958–1962 and courtyard infill areas 1991–1993).

Even with the enlargements, Congress eventually grew too big for the building and new facilities had to be constructed to meet the needs of the government. With the moving of the Library of Congress into its own building in 1897, and with the construction of new office buildings for the House and Senate in the early 20th century, the Capitol Complex was born.

Known simply as the "House Office Building" and "Senate Office Building" when they opened in 1908 and 1909, the Cannon House Office Building and Russell Senate Office Building became the first buildings solely for use as offices by the House of Representatives and the Senate. These new buildings were heated and provided with electricity by the new Capitol Power Plant which opened in 1910 and is still used today.

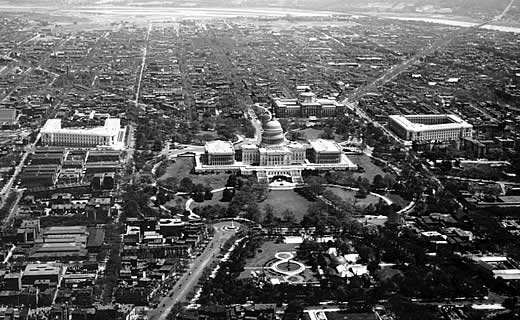
Aerial view of the United States Capitol Complex, c. 1923

The 1930s was a decade of major construction within the growing Capitol Complex. In 1933 alone the U.S. Botanic Garden Conservatory, Director's residence, and Bartholdi Park were completed; the Senate Office Building's First Street wing, which had been omitted during construction for funding reasons, was added; and the Additional House Office Building (later named the Longworth House Office Building) was occupied. The Supreme Court at last found a permanent home when its own building was completed in 1935. The last building constructed within the complex in this decade was the Library of Congress Annex, now named the John Adams Building, which opened in 1939.

Within twenty years, attention returned to the need for more Congressional office space; this led to the construction of a second building for the Senate (now named the Dirksen Senate Office Building), which was completed in 1958. The House's third building, the Rayburn House Office Building, opened in 1965.

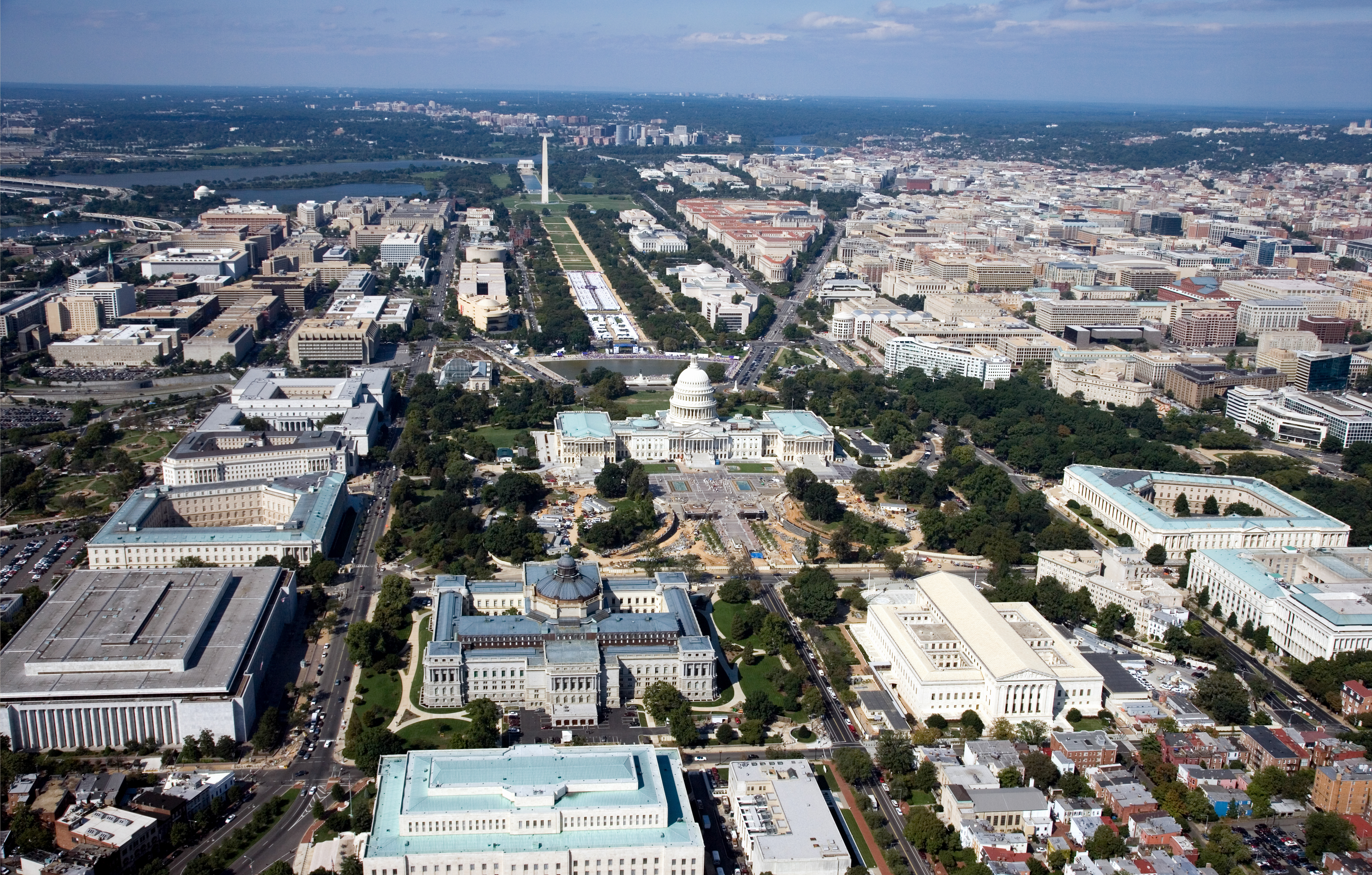
Capitol Complex (in foreground, 2007) looking west toward the National Mall

In the 1970s, two more buildings became available for the House: the former Congressional Hotel, the O'Neill House Office Building (demolished in 2002), and a larger building originally constructed for the Federal Bureau of Investigation (now the Ford House Office Building). Congress authorized the $1.4 million purchase in 1972 of the land that became Providence Park; it was intended for a dormitory for congressional pages, but the plan never advanced. A third building for the Library of Congress, the James Madison Memorial Building, opened in 1980 and the Senate's third building, the Hart Senate Office Building, was occupied in 1982. The most recent large structure within the Capitol complex is the Thurgood Marshall Federal Judiciary Building, which was opened in 1992.

Renovations to the Botanic Garden Conservatory began in September 1997 and continued for four years until December 2001 when the building reopened. The Conservatory's aluminum framework, glazing, interior floors, doors, and lighting were replaced; all electrical, plumbing, and environmental control systems were upgraded, and air conditioning was added to the display halls.

The newest addition to the Capitol Complex is the Capitol Visitor Center. Despite many delays, the Center opened in December 2008, and includes an exhibition gallery, two theaters, a dining facility, and gift shops. The budget for construction of the center was $584 million.

On January 6, 2021, the Capitol was stormed by supporters of President Donald Trump after a rally in front of the White House. A Capitol Police officer was wounded and was pronounced dead a day later at a nearby hospital. Additionally, one of the protesters was shot and later pronounced dead at a nearby hospital. A further three deaths from medical emergencies were reported while over a hundred injuries were reported by Capitol Police.

== See also ==
- Architecture of Washington, D.C.
