= Spirit of Justice Park =

Park in Washington, D.C., U.S.

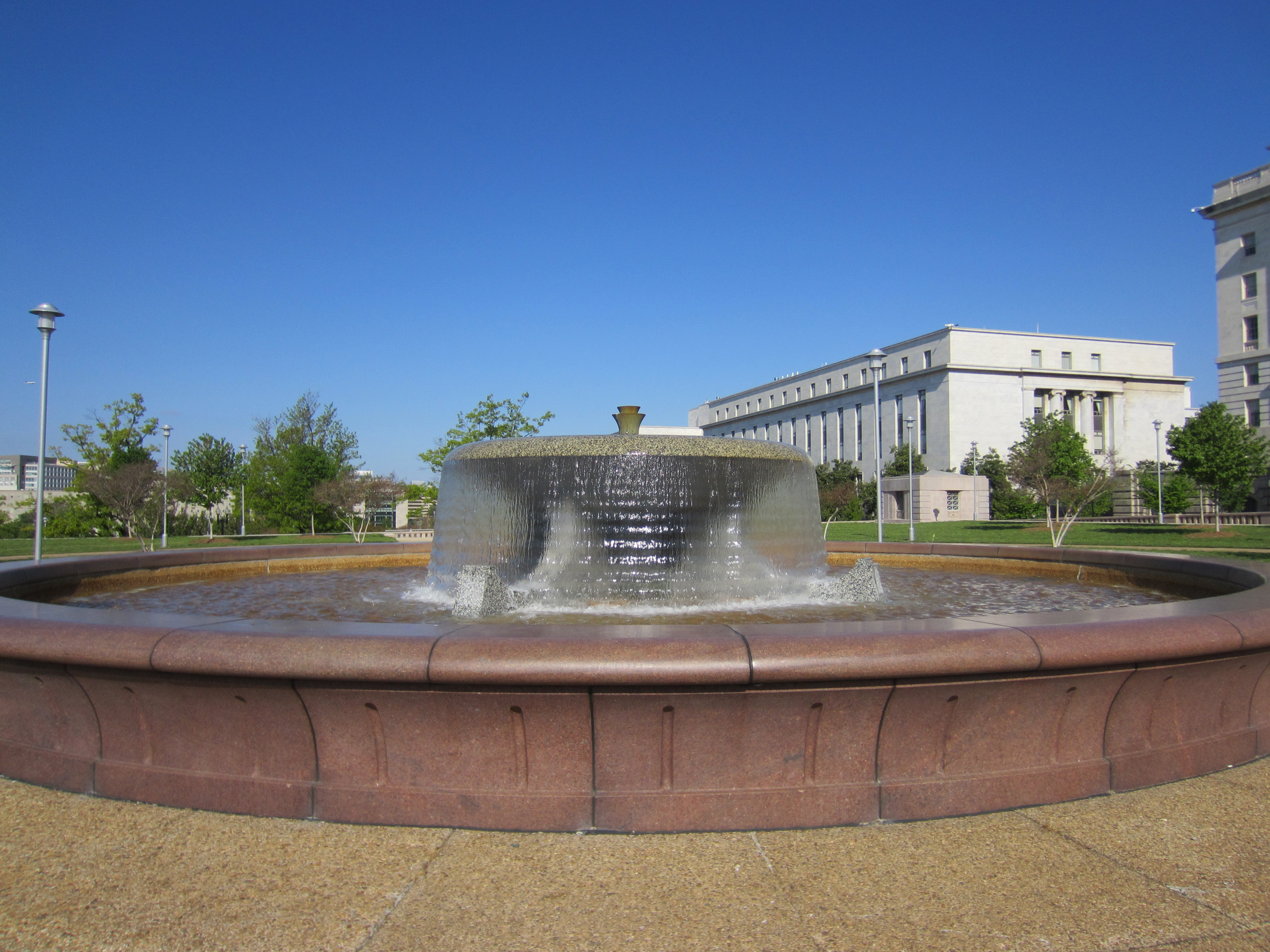
- House East Fountain, Rayburn House Office Building in the background, April 2013

- Location within Central Washington, D.C.
- Location: Washington, D.C.
- Coordinates: 38°53′8″N 77°0′35.56″W
- Administrator: Architect of the Capitol
- Public transit: Capitol South

Spirit of Justice Park is a park in Washington, D.C., in the United States. Bounded by C Street to the north, D Street to the south, Delaware Ave SW to the west and New Jersey Ave SE to the east, the park is located south of the United States Capitol and is separated into two sections by South Capitol Street Southwest.

Spirit of Justice Park is a green roof on an underground parking garage built by the Architect of the Capitol to service the House Office Buildings. A number of buildings were demolished to make way for the House parking garage, including the George Washington Inn (pictured).
