= Bartholdi Fountain =

Public fountain in Washington, D.C., United States

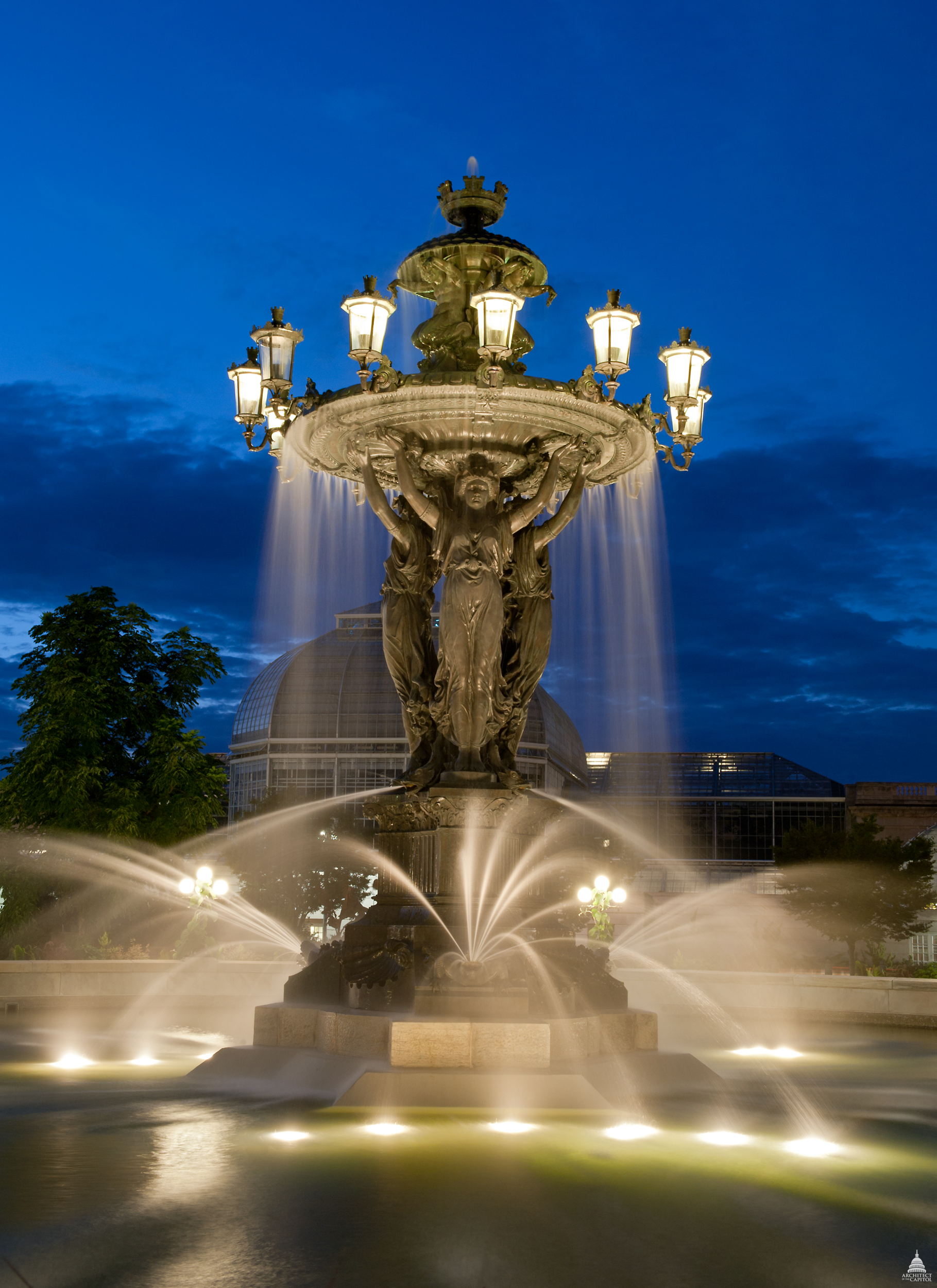
- The restored Bartholdi Fountain illuminated, summer of 2011, from the Architect of the Capitol
- Artist: Frédéric Auguste Bartholdi
- Year: 1876
- Type: Bronze
- Dimensions: 910 cm (30 ft)
- Location: Washington, D.C., U.S.; 38.887127°N 77.012669°W
- Owner: United States Botanic Garden

The Bartholdi Fountain is a monumental public fountain, designed by Frédéric Auguste Bartholdi, who later created the Statue of Liberty. The fountain was originally made for the 1876 Centennial Exposition in Philadelphia, Pennsylvania, and is now located at the corner of Independence Avenue and First Street, SW, in the United States Botanic Garden, on the grounds of the United States Capitol, in Washington D.C.

== History ==
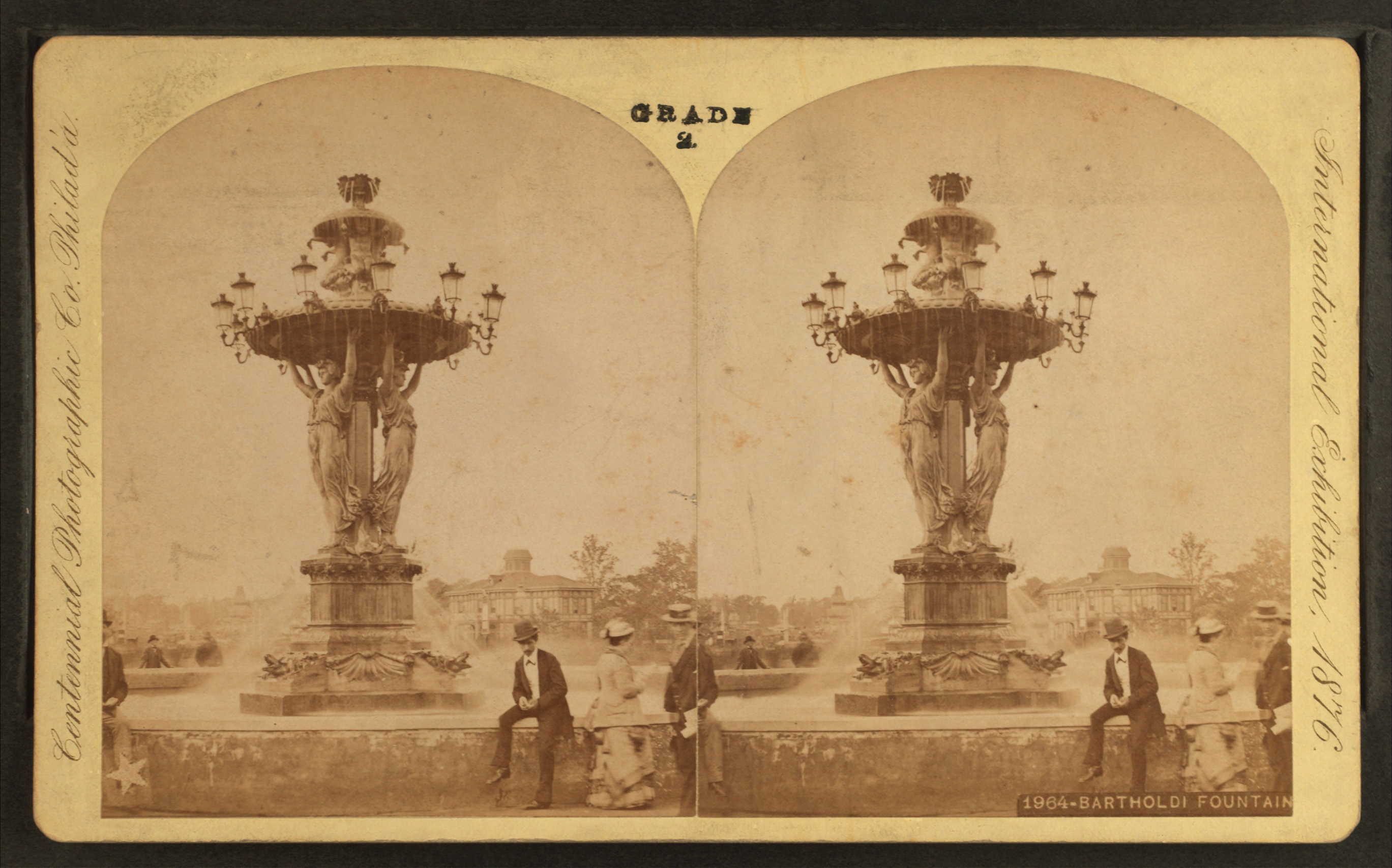
A stereoscopic albumen print of the Bartholdi Fountain, by Centennial Photographic Co. in 1876, now housed at the New York Public Library

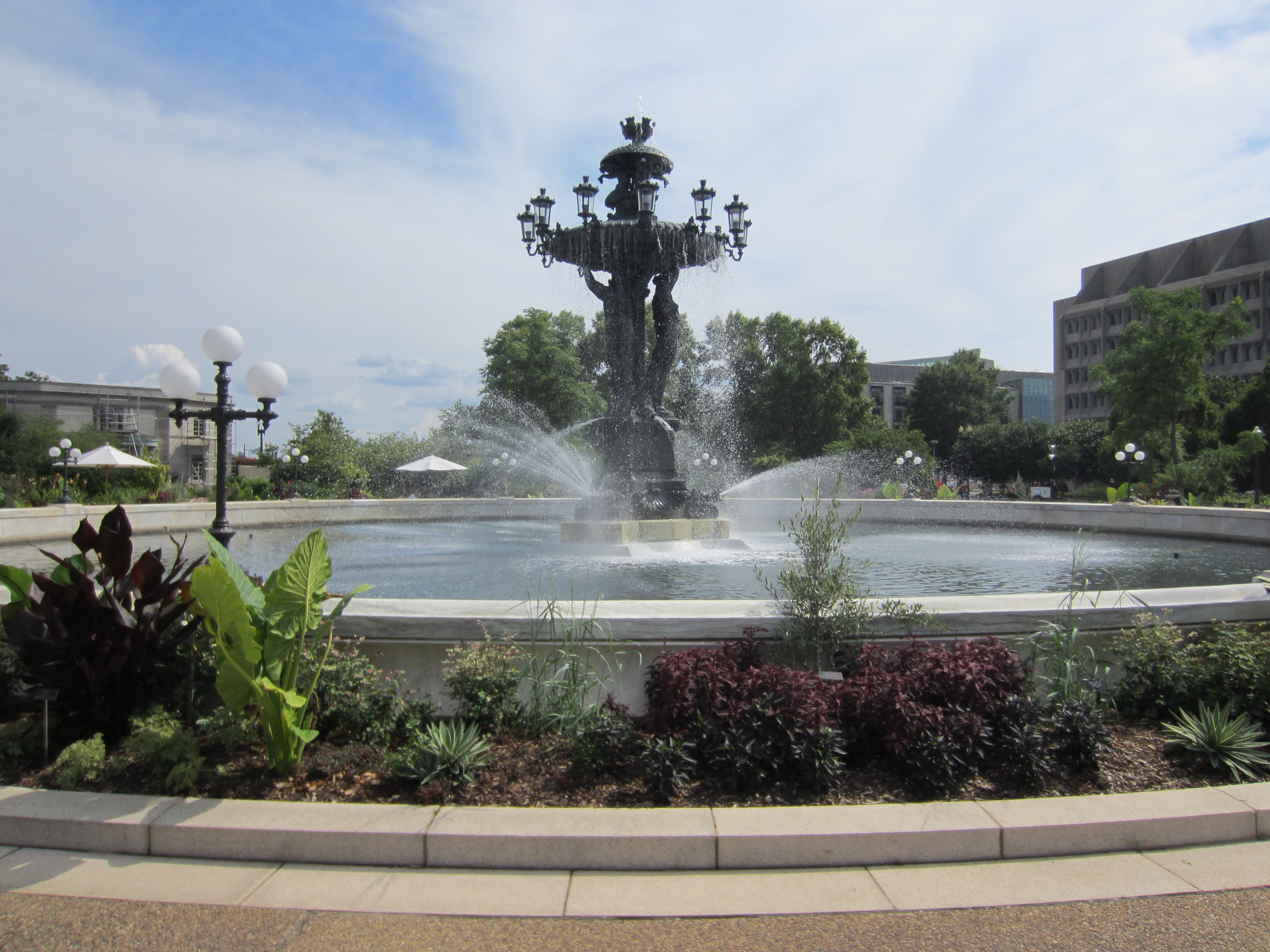
The restored Bartholdi Fountain in Washington, D.C. in 2012

The Fountain of Light and Water, commonly called the Bartholdi Fountain, was created for the Centennial Exposition in Philadelphia in 1876, which celebrated the 100th birthday of the adoption of the Declaration of Independence. It was designed by French sculptor Frédéric Auguste Bartholdi, and it was cast by the Durenne foundry in France, which had won awards for its cast-iron fountains at earlier international expositions in 1862, 1867 and 1873. Bartholdi offered the fountain to the Exposition for free; he intended to sell it afterwards, and to sell others of the same design to other cities. The fountains stood at the center of the esplanade, near the main entrance to the exposition.

When the exposition ended in 1877, Bartholdi did not find any buyers for his fountain. One year later it was purchased by the United States Congress, which offered him only six thousand dollars, half the sum he had originally asked.

In 1878, it was placed at the base of Capitol Hill in Washington, D.C.. In 1881, Secretary of State James Blaine suggested moving it to Dupont Circle, near his new mansion. The assassination of James Garfield interrupted the conversations and the idea was dropped.

In 1926, it was removed and stored to facilitate completion of the George Gordon Meade Memorial, and for landscaping improvements around the Grant Memorial. In 1932, the sculpture was placed at its current location in the United States Botanic Garden, on the grounds of the United States Capitol,

In 2008, the Architect of the Capitol began a complete restoration of the fountain and its basin, the first complete deconstruction and restoration since 1927. The restoration repaired deterioration to the metals inside and out, and also provided modern pumps and motors, a new water treatment and filtration system, and a zinc coating to preserve the original cast-iron of the fountain. The fountain was returned to Bartholdi Park in spring 2011.

== Design ==
The fountain is composed of a series of basins, supported by sculptures of classical figures. The cast iron is coated with bronze, stands 30 feet (9.1 m) high, and weighs 30,000 pounds (14,000 kg). It stands in the center of a large circular marble pool.

Three figures of women, standing on a triangle pedestal with an ornamental design of seashells and three reptiles spouting water, support the lower cast iron vasque, which is adorned with a circle of 12 lamps. In the center, three kneeling tritons support another, smaller and higher vasque. Water spouts from a crown at the top, cascades down into the smaller vasque, and then down into the larger vasque before spilling into the main basin.

The cascade of water was illuminated by the gas lamps, which were later replaced with electric globes, making it one of the first monuments in Washington, D.C. to be lit at night, and a popular evening destination in the 1880s.

== See also ==
- List of public art in Washington, D.C., Ward 6

== Bibliography ==
- Marilyn Symmes, editor, Fountains: Splash and Spectacle—Water and Design from the Renaissance to the Present, Thames and Hudson, in association with Cooper-Hewitt National Design Museum, Smithsonian Institution, 1998.
