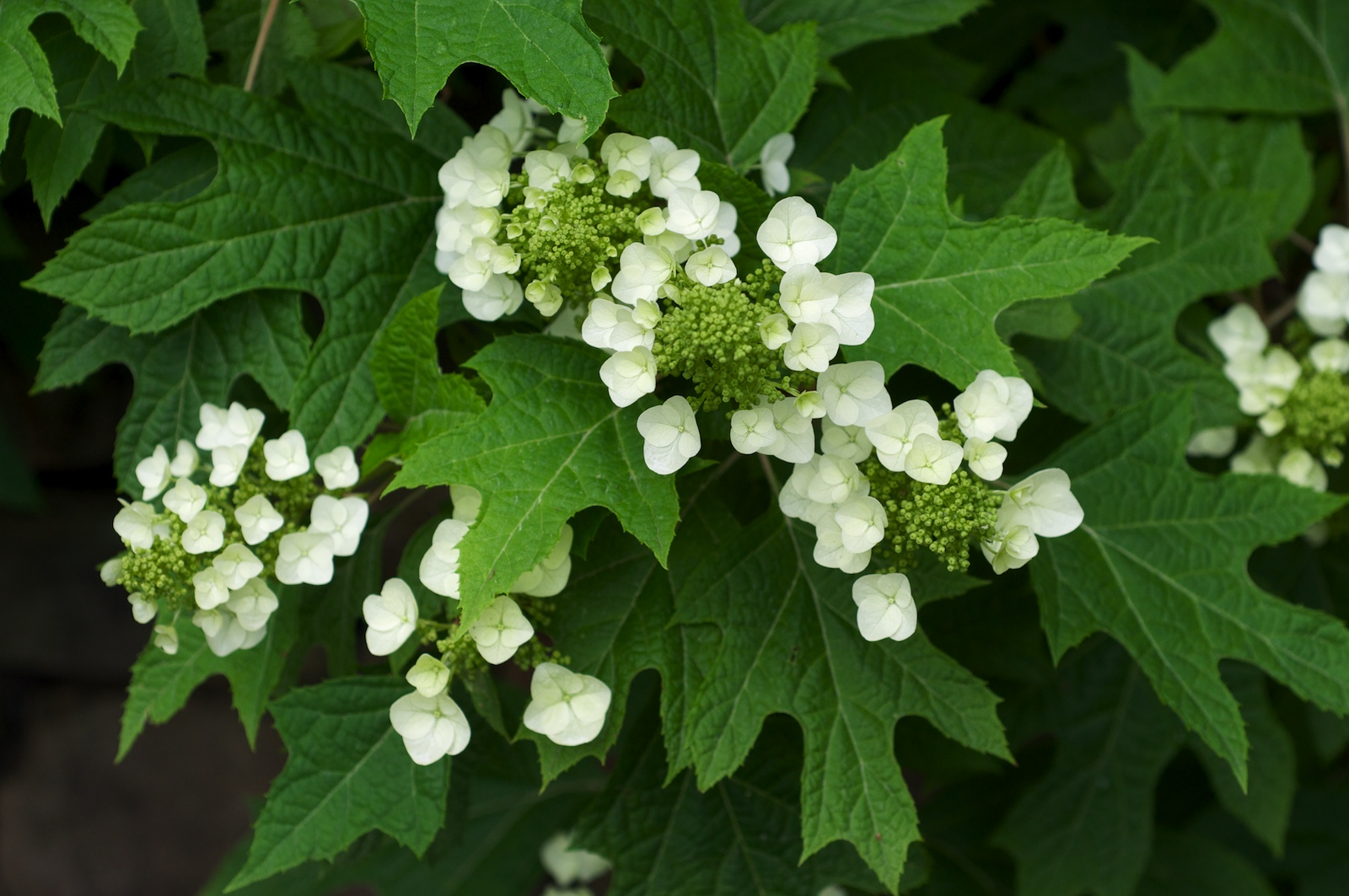

Conservation status
- Secure (NatureServe)

Scientific classification
- Kingdom: Plantae
- Clade: Embryophytes
- Clade: Tracheophytes
- Clade: Spermatophytes
- Clade: Angiosperms
- Clade: Eudicots
- Clade: Asterids
- Order: Cornales
- Family: Hydrangeaceae
- Genus: Hydrangea
- Species: H. quercifolia

Binomial name
- Hydrangea quercifolia Bartram

= Hydrangea quercifolia =

Oakleaf hydrangea

Species of flowering plant

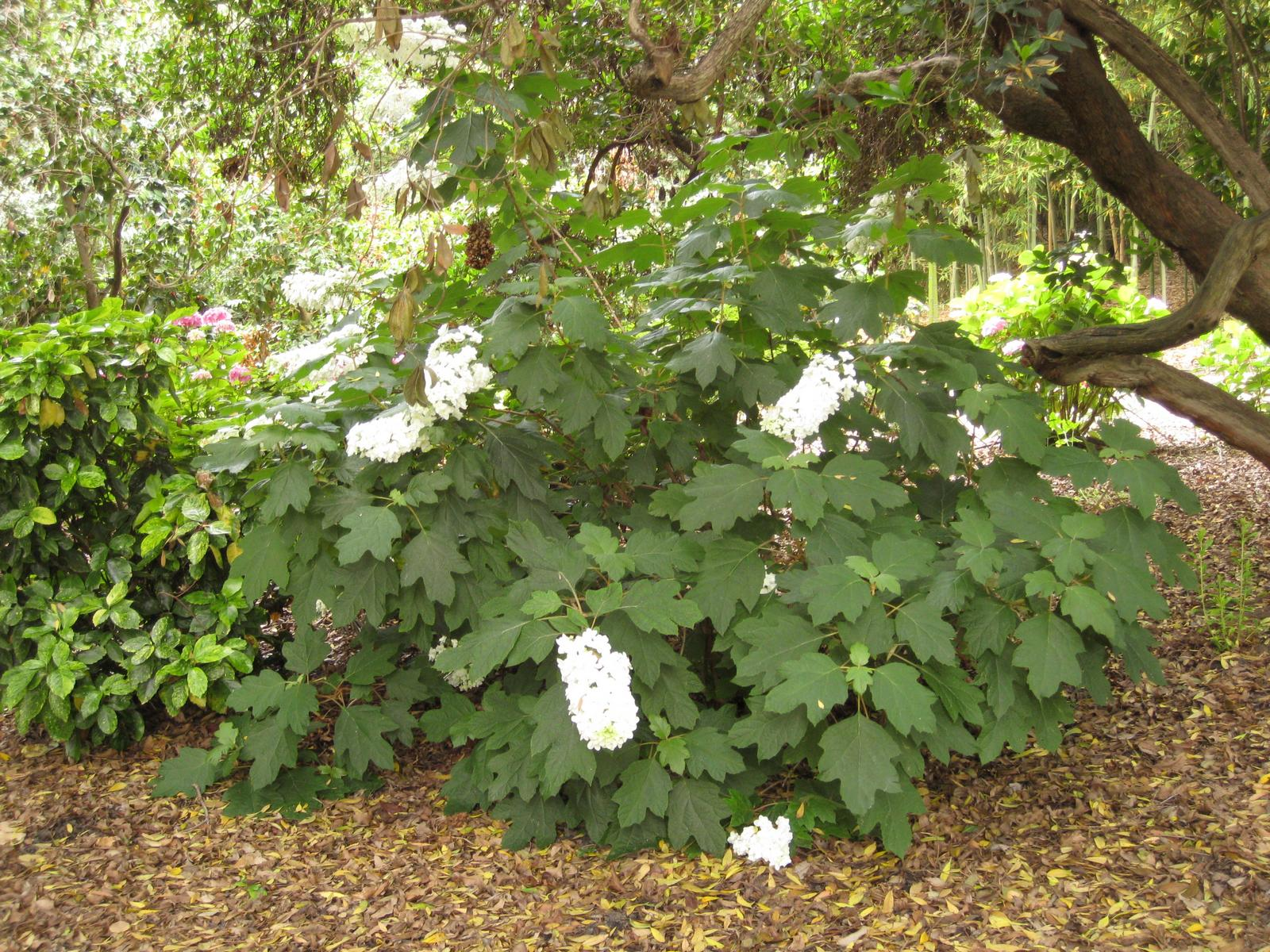

Hydrangea quercifolia, commonly known as oakleaf hydrangea or oak-leaved hydrangea, is a species of flowering plant in the family Hydrangeaceae. It is native to the southeastern United States, in woodland habitats from North Carolina west to Tennessee, and south to Florida and Eastern Texas. A deciduous shrub with white showy flower heads, it is grown as a garden plant, with numerous cultivars available commercially.

Its specific epithet combines the Latin words quercus ("oak") and folium ("leaf"). However, it is not closely related to oak species (Quercus).

== Description ==
Hydrangea quercifolia is a coarse-textured deciduous shrub growing to 3–12 feet (0.91–3.66 m) tall with an open crown. The plant sprouts shoots from underground stolons and often grows in colonies. Young stems are covered in a felt-like light brown bark, and the larger stems have attractive cinnamon-tan-orange bark that shreds and peels in thin flakes.

The leaves are yellowish green to dark green on top and silvery-white underneath. They have three, five or seven pointed lobes and are 4–12 in (10.2–30.5 cm) long and almost as wide. They vaguely resemble larger versions of oak leaves, similar to Quercus species with lobed foliage. Plants in shade have larger leaves than those grown in sun. The leaves turn rich shades of red, bronze and purple in autumn that persist in winter accompanying the persistent dried flower-heads.

=== Flowers ===
Hydrangea quercifolia flowers are borne in erect panicles 6–12 in (15.2–30.5 cm) tall and 3–5 in (7.6–12.7 cm) wide at branch tips. Flowers age in colour from creamy white, aging to pink and by autumn and winter are a dry, papery rusty-brown.

Unlike bigleaf hydrangea (Hydrangea macrophylla), flower color does not vary with soil pH. Flower color does, however, vary throughout each growing season. The flowers are a pale green as they emerge and open to a bright white, ageing to either pink or brown (depending on the cultivar/seedling).

Hydrangea quercifolia and Hydrangea paniculata are the only hydrangeas with cone-shaped flower clusters (i.e. panicles); all the others have their flowers in ball-shaped or flat-topped clusters, called umbels.

Like many other Hydrangea species, oakleaf hydrangea inflorescences are composed of two flower types; showy flowers with enlarged petal-like sepals and inconspicuous flowers with non-showy petals and sepals. The showy flowers, whose function is to attract pollinators, typically obscure the inconspicuous flowers to some degree.

Although faint, Hydrangea quercifolia flowers have a pleasing scent. The floral scent in oakleaf hydrangea is stronger than that of the other commonly cultivated Hydrangea species. Presumably the function of the floral scent is to attract pollinators, although this has not yet been studied. The fragrance can be described as being most similar to Syringa reticulata (Japanese tree lilac), although not as strong.

=== Fruit ===
The fruit of Hydrangea quercifolia are dry dehiscent capsules which are green following pollination and ripen to brown as they mature. The stigmas remain on the fruit and dry to form horn-shaped appendages atop the capsule with an opening between them to allow the seeds to disperse.

=== Seeds ===
Hydrangea quercifolia seeds are quite small, approximately 0.6 mm long (and with a thousand seed weight of 0.0356 g) allowing several to develop within each capsule. Seed color varies from light tan to dark brown with longitudinal striations. Seed shape is ellipsoidal to ovate. Seed storage behavior is considered to be orthodox in nature, allowing them to store for relatively long periods of time at cold temperatures. The seeds typically germinate readily in 7–14 days as long as they are not allowed to dry out after sowing.

== Distribution ==
Hydrangea quercifolia is native to the south eastern United States (Alabama, Florida, Georgia (w.), Louisiana (e.), Mississippi, North Carolina, South Carolina, Tennessee), but naturalized in other parts of the US and widely cultivated elsewhere.

In nature, Hydrangea quercifolia is found in a variety of habitats but almost always on well drained, shady slopes. These include riverbanks, bluffs and rocky outcroppings. The tendency of the species to grow on calcareous soils or cliffs as well as deep alluvial soil suggests it has a wide tolerance of soil substrates as long as they are well drained.

== Uses ==
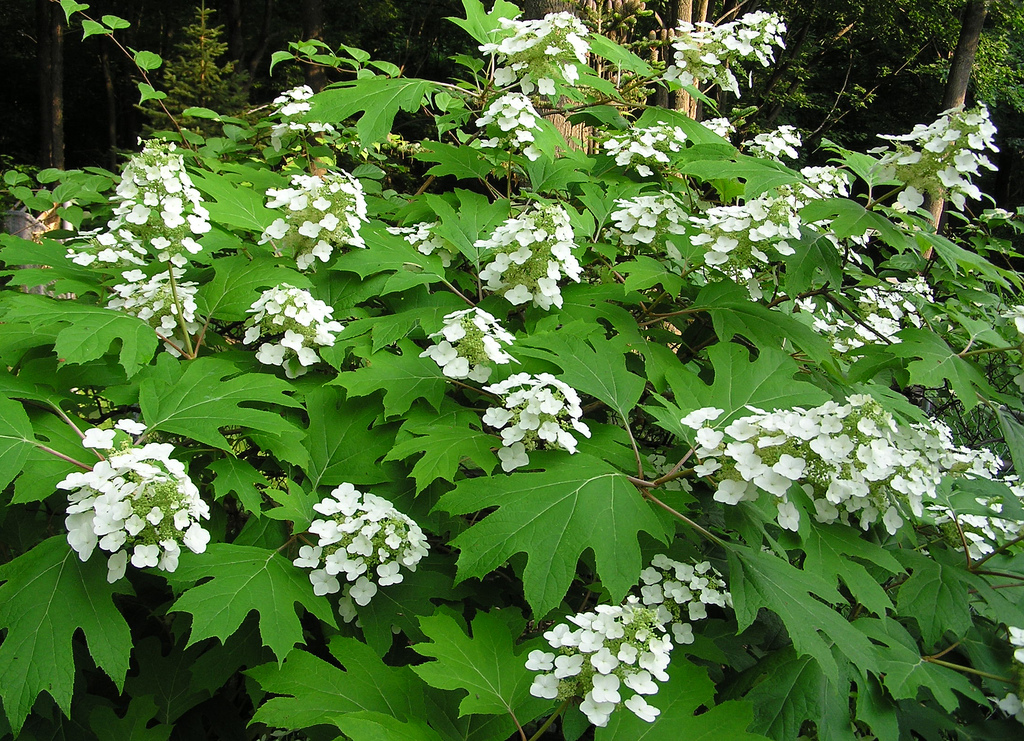

=== Garden history ===
Hydrangea quercifolia was noted by 18th-century botanist William Bartram in his botanizing exploration from the Carolinas to the Florida panhandle in the 1770s. His first documentation of the plant was located along the "brook called Sweet Water" in what is now south-central Georgia. It was slow to enter British and American gardens. In Britain it flowers less profusely and even has a reputation for being tender.

=== Cultivation ===
Hydrangea quercifolia is cultivated as an ornamental plant in gardens and parks. Though frequently seen as an isolated subject in gardens, it is at its best in a natural or landscaped woodland habitat against the backdrop of larger shrubs and trees. It prefers partial to almost full shade, with morning sun and afternoon shade as optimal. It will tolerate drought, but may not flower. In the UK the cultivars Snowflake='Brido' and Snow Queen='Flemygea' have gained the Royal Horticultural Society's Award of Garden Merit.

Propagation is via cutting or division; short sections of clustered stems with some root attached will make a small shrub in a nursery row.

Fresh or dry, the blossoms of Hydrangea quercifolia are attractive as cut flowers.

==== Cold hardiness ====
Oakleaf hydrangea is typically stated to be hardy to USDA Zone 5-9, although the true cold hardiness varies for each cultivar and throughout the species range. Plants from more northern sources are typically more cold hardy in midwinter than plants from southern sources; moreover, plants native to Florida are substantially less cold hardy than those from other southern sources. Cold hardiness also varies throughout winter, with early loss of cold hardiness being the main limiting factor to cultivation in northern environments. The cultivar 'Ruby Slippers' maintains its cold hardiness well into April, while 'Sikes Dwarf' (despite being very cold hardy in midwinter) loses its cold hardiness very rapidly in late winter. Out of nine cultivars tested, Snow Queen='Flemygea' was consistently the least cold hardy throughout winter.

==== Diseases ====
There are several notable diseases that infect Hydrangea quercifolia. Root rot diseases can be fatal while foliar diseases tend to be only cosmetic. Root rot diseases include Phytophthora, Pythium and Fusarium, which are all fungal diseases. Management techniques to decreases incidence of root rot include proper watering (allowing the soil to dry between waterings), removal of diseased plant parts, and fungicides if needed. Compared to other Hydrangea species, oakleaf hydrangea is more susceptible to Fusarium root rot; however, disease severity varies among cultivars with 'John Wayne' and Snowflake='Brido' being the most tolerant. The primary foliar disease in oakleaf hydrangea is Xanthomonas leaf spot, which is a bacterial disease. Management techniques to decrease leaf spot severity include avoiding overhead irrigation and planting resistant cultivars. In a recent study, the cultivars 'Alice' and Snow Queen='Flemygea' had the lowest disease severity while 'Queen of Hearts' had the highest severity. Some wild plants that are native to Florida have even lower disease severity than any cultivar and could serve as an important seed source for breeding disease resistance.

== Genomics ==
Oakleaf hydrangea is a diploid species with 2n=2x=36 chromosomes. Hydrangea quercifolia has one of the smallest genomes in the genus (1.95 - 2.17 pg 2C DNA). In nature, the genetic diversity of Hydrangea quercifolia is structured geographically in six 'clusters' of genetically similar populations. These genetic clusters are weakly differentiated but each one has unique genetics nonetheless. In addition to neutral genetic diversity (13.5% of the diversity), there is evidence of genomic selection in response to climatic variables (11.3% of genetic diversity) of which, precipitation seems to play a major role.

== Conservation ==
The native range of Hydrangea quercifolia appears to be contracting, despite high abundance in the central portion of the range. In a recent survey of the species, 23% of previously recorded populations no longer existed and many of the remaining populations were at high risk of extirpation. Causes of local extirpation was attributed to habitat loss or degradation often times due to invasive species, logging or commercial development. Oakleaf hydrangea was noted as not tolerating high competition and is therefore highly susceptible to the negative impacts of invasive species. The researchers noted that these effects could be mitigated by protecting and managing land with substantial populations, especially on the species' range edge. To add to the conservation concern, many of the populations on the edge of the native range have unique genetics (especially in Louisiana and Florida) making them especially important to protect as a source of valuable genetic diversity.

== Symbolism ==
Hydrangea quercifolia was declared the official state wildflower of Alabama in 1999.

== Gallery ==
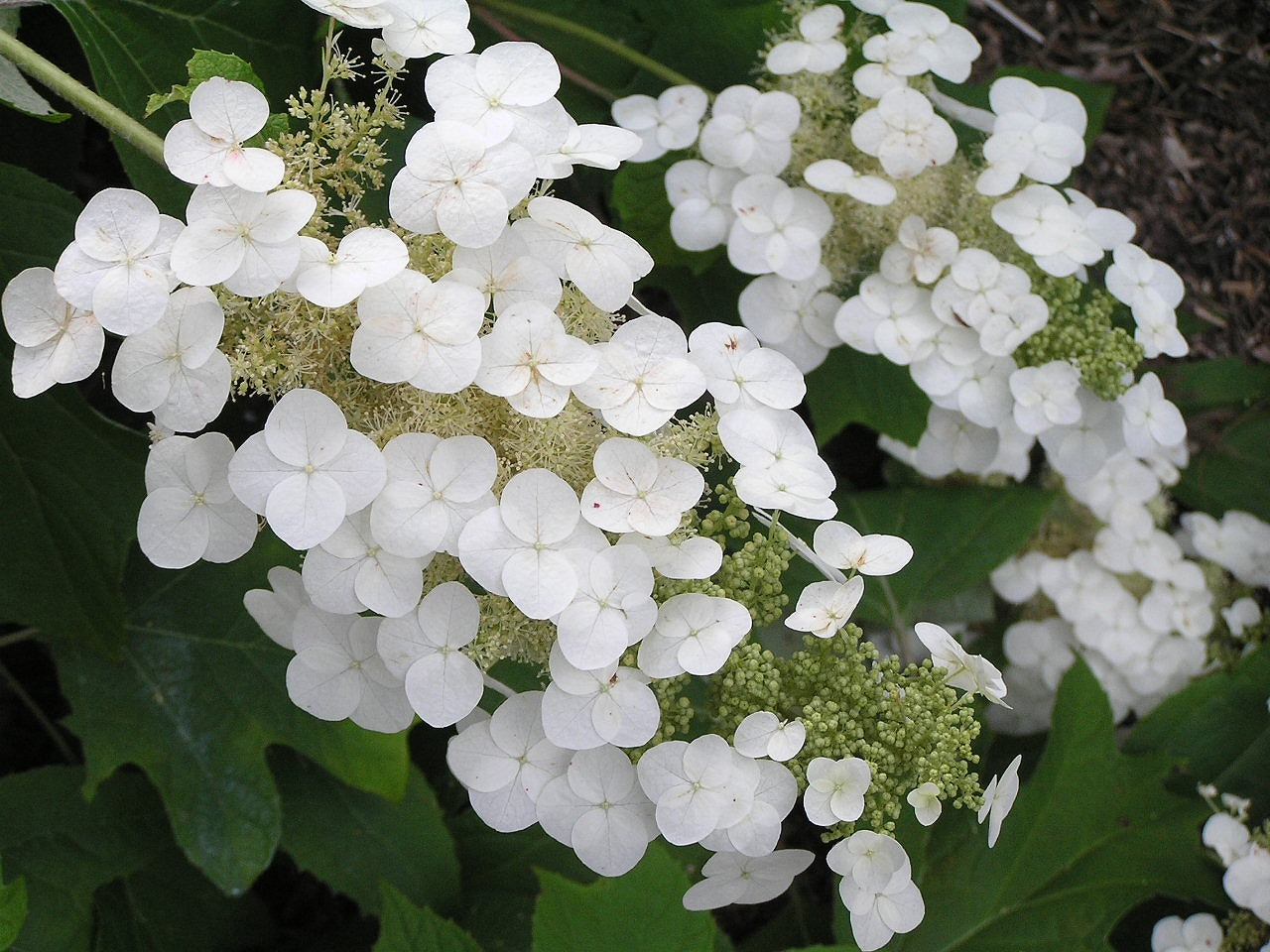
White flowering species type

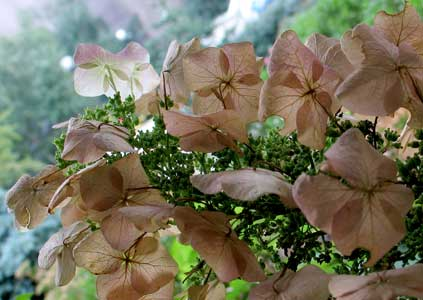
Pink flowering selection

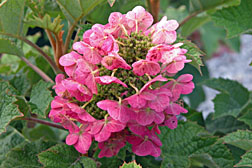
'Ruby Slippers' cultivar

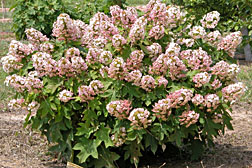
'Munchkin'

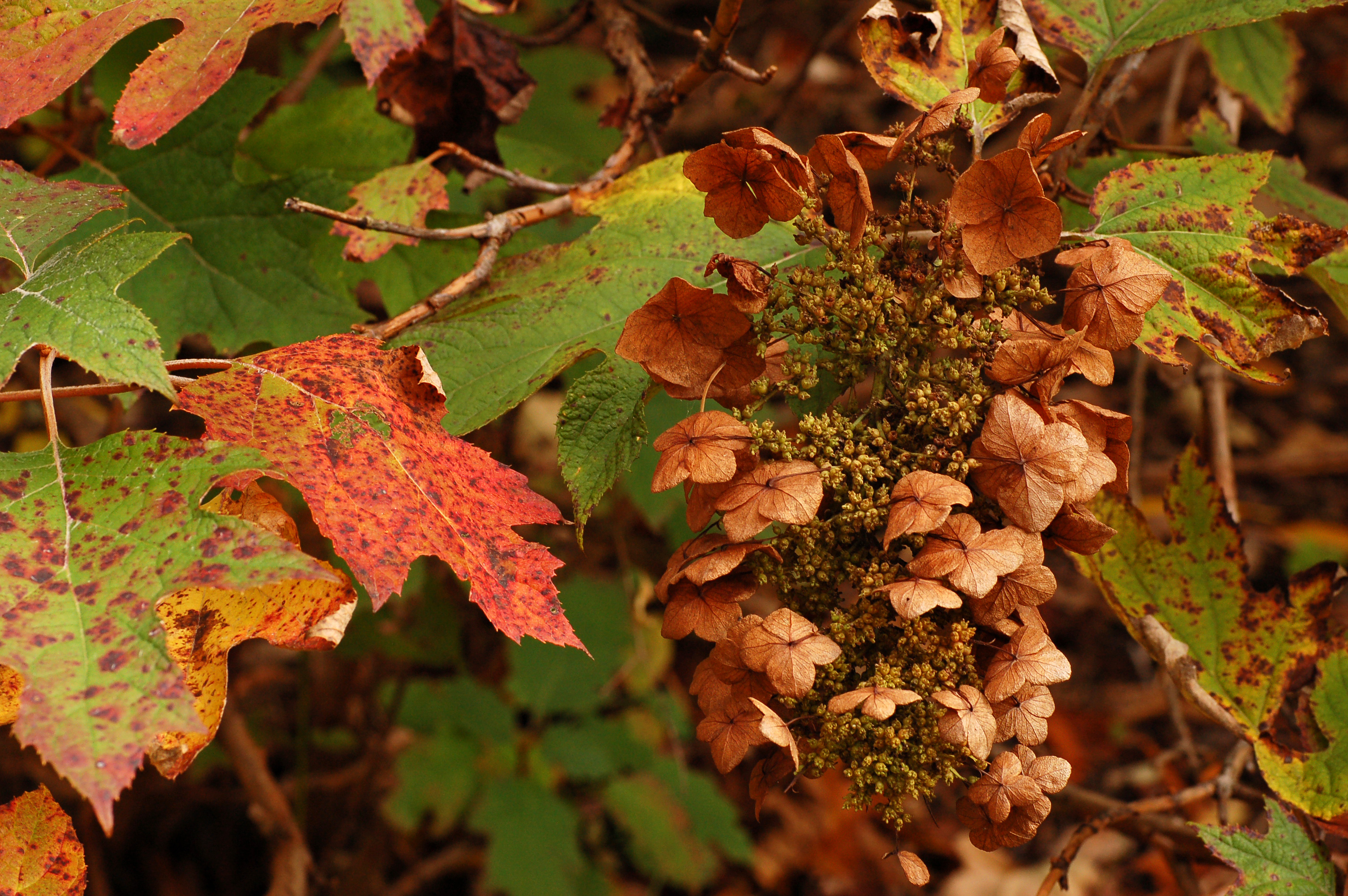
Brown flowers and colored leaves in autumn

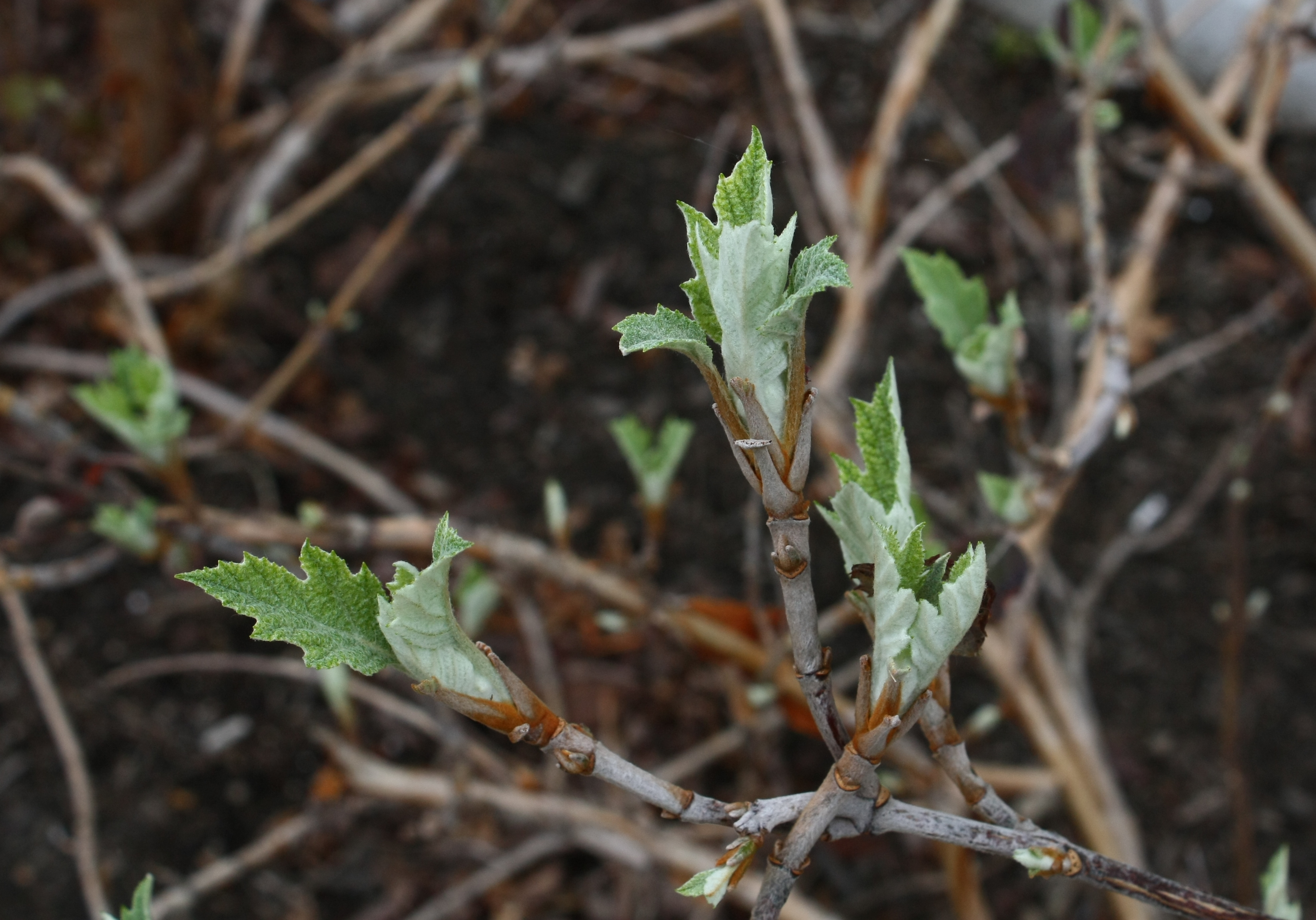
Spring leaf shoots
