= Capitol Power Plant =

Fossil-fuel burning power plant in Washington, DC

Coordinates: 38°52′58.35″N 77°0′27.06″W

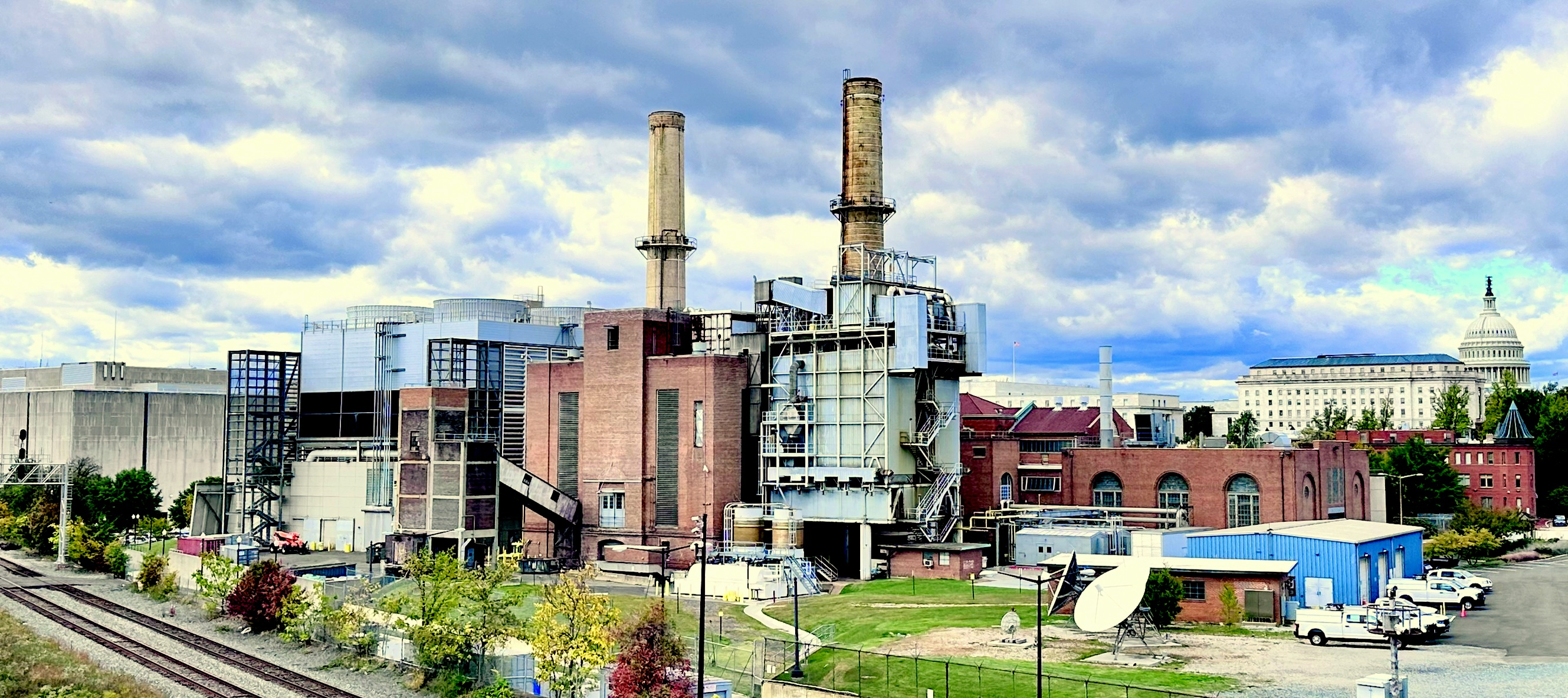
Capitol Power Plant in 2023, viewed from Interstate 695

The Capitol Power Plant is a fossil-fuel burning power plant which provides steam and chilled water for the United States Capitol, the Supreme Court, the Library of Congress and 19 other buildings in the Capitol Complex. Located at 25 E St SE in southeast Washington, D.C., the CPP was the only coal-burning power plant in the District of Columbia, and it now mostly uses natural gas. The plant has been serving the Capitol since 1910, and is under the administration of the Architect of the Capitol (see 2 U.S.C. § 2162).

According to the U.S. Department of Energy, the facility released 118,851 tons of carbon dioxide in 2007. In 2009, it switched to using natural gas, unless coal was needed for backup capacity. Though it was originally built to supply the Capitol complex with electricity as well, the plant stopped generating electricity in 1951. In 2013, it was announced that the Capitol Power Plant would add a cogeneration plant that will use natural gas in a combustion turbine to efficiently generate both electricity and heat for steam, thus further reducing emissions. A 7.5 megawatt cogeneration facility was completed at the CPP in 2018. In 2021 it produced 32,000 tons of carbon dioxide.

== History ==
The Capitol Power Plant at the turn of the 20th century

The power plant was constructed under the terms of an act of Congress passed on April 28, 1904, and authorized in order to support two new office buildings that were then being planned. Now known as the Cannon House Office Building and the Russell Senate Office Building, these new offices required a substantial increase in energy supplied to Capitol Hill. In addition, the U.S. Capitol and the Library of Congress would also receive power from the new plant, along with all future buildings to be constructed on the Capitol campus.

Originally called the "Heating, Lighting, and Power Plant," the Capitol Power Plant was one of the earliest 25 Hz alternating current electric-generating facilities in the United States. The original steam boilers were replaced in 1923. In 1950 the steam boilers were modernized and replaced with coal-fired steam generators; at the same time, the plant's electricity generating capacity had reached its limit, and the decision was made to abandon electricity production in favor of the local electrical utility. The expansion of the plant to support additional new construction was authorized in 1958, 1970, and in the early 21st century to support the opening of the Capitol Visitor Center.

== Controversy ==
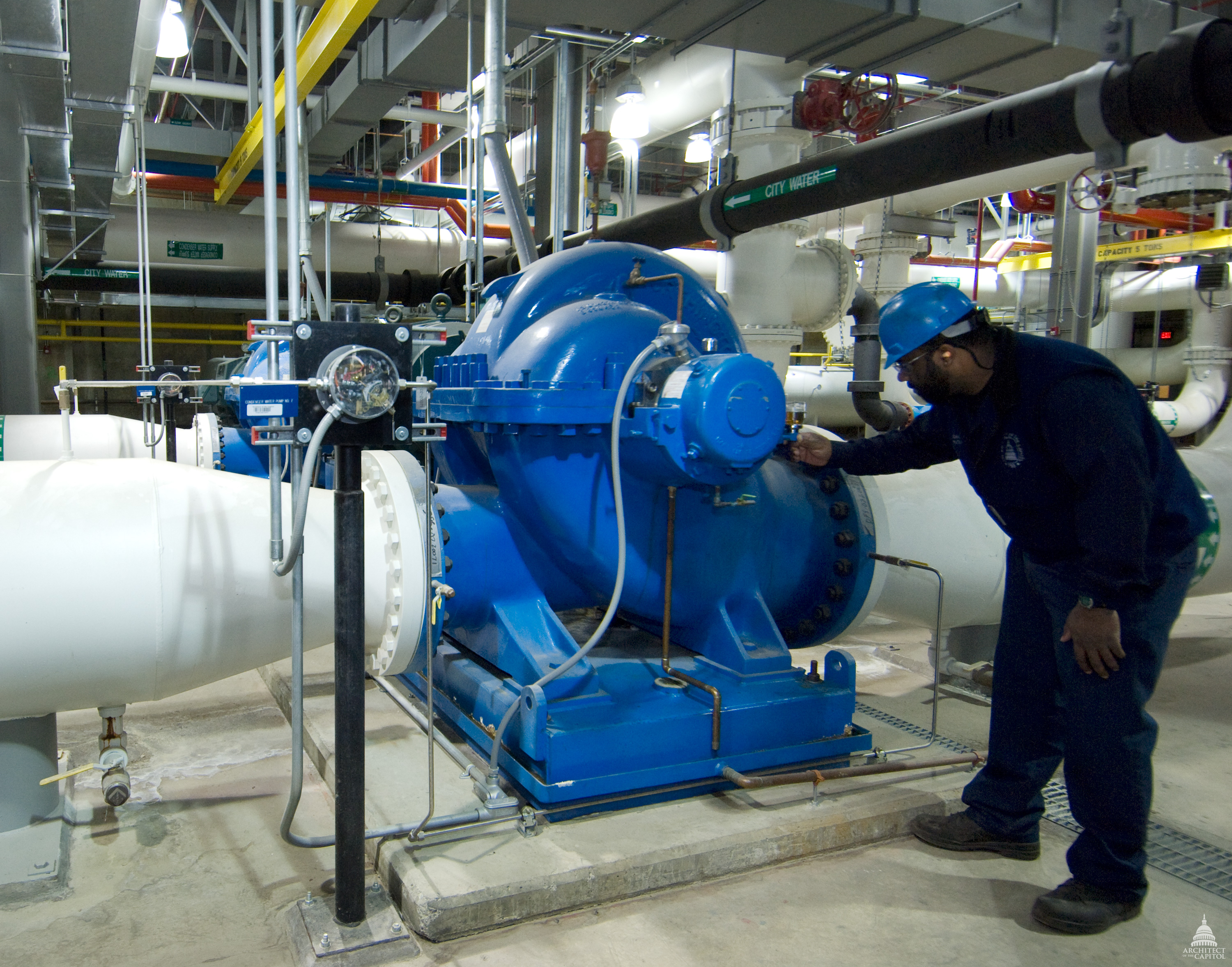
A Capitol Power Plant employee inspecting the equipment, from the Architect of the Capitol

Senators from coal mining states blocked a proposal in 2000 to use cleaner fuel for the plant. Senators Mitch McConnell (Republican of Kentucky) and Robert Byrd (Democrat of West Virginia), both from coal mining states, used their influence as two of the Senate's most senior members to block this proposal. In May 2007, CNN reported that two companies, International Resources Inc. and the Kanawha Eagle mine, have a contract to supply a combined 40,000 tons of coal to the plant over the next two years. The companies gave a combined $26,300 to the McConnell and Byrd campaigns for the 2006 election.

In June 2007, Speaker of the House Nancy Pelosi announced the "Greening the Capitol" initiative. The initiative's goal is to make the Capitol carbon neutral, and the power plant is a major obstacle to achieving this objective. In November 2007, Daniel Beard, the House's Chief Administrative Officer, announced that he would purchase $89,000 worth of carbon offsets for 30,000 tons of carbon emissions. Beard made the purchase from the Chicago Climate Exchange. On February 28, 2009, Pelosi and Senate Majority Leader Harry Reid sent a letter to the Architect of the Capitol asking him to create a plan to switch the power plant entirely to natural gas by the end of 2009. This letter came just three days before a March 2009 scheduled protest (which happened despite the change).

In response to the letter from Pelosi and Reid, the Architect of the Capitol replied on May 1, 2009 that the plant had been transitioning to natural gas and was prepared to switch completely to that fuel, using coal only as a backup source. In 2008, the plant had operated on about 65% natural gas and 35% coal, compared to 58% coal in 2005. By 2011, coal use at the CPP was down to 5%.

In 2013, the Architect of the Capitol announced that it had "identified the construction of a cogeneration plant as the most environmentally and economically beneficial way to meet its goal to use natural gas 100% of the time." The new cogeneration unit would use 100 percent natural gas to provide power for the 23 buildings of the Capitol complex, which includes the Capitol Building, the House and Senate office buildings, the Supreme Court, the U.S. Botanic Garden and the Library of Congress buildings, among others. Not only will it reduce the use of coal on-site for the chillers and boilers, but it would provide 93% of the facility's electricity. This would allow it to replace inefficient, 45% coal-generated electricity bought from the grid with more efficiently generated, on-site electricity that uses no coal. They completed the permitting process for this facility in June 2013.

== Emissions ==
Table 1: Summary of Point Source Emissions: District of Columbia in 2002 (Tons)

Facility	PM2.5	NOx	SO2	PM10
Capitol Power Plant	83	129	483	84
Pepco Benning Road Generating Station 15/16	15	253	1467	67
Pepco Buzzard Point Generating Station	5	340	390	5
GSA Central Heating Plant	12	66	8	12
10 Miscellaneous Sources	12	529	320	14
TOTAL	127	1,317	2,468	182
Share produced by Capitol Power Plant	65%	10%	20%	46%

Table 2: Summary of Pollution Reduction at the Capitol Power Plant Following Transition to Natural Gas (Tons)

Pollutants	2007	2008	2009	2010	2011
SO2	460.95	240.73	175.33	36.98	48.04
NOx	189.02	128.79	121.20	105.15	90.36
PM	114.08	33.09	39.09	32.92	19.09
Hazardous Air Pollutants	-	39.62	29.68	6.03	8.40
CO2e	118,851	-	-	83,103	78,862

=== Particulates ===
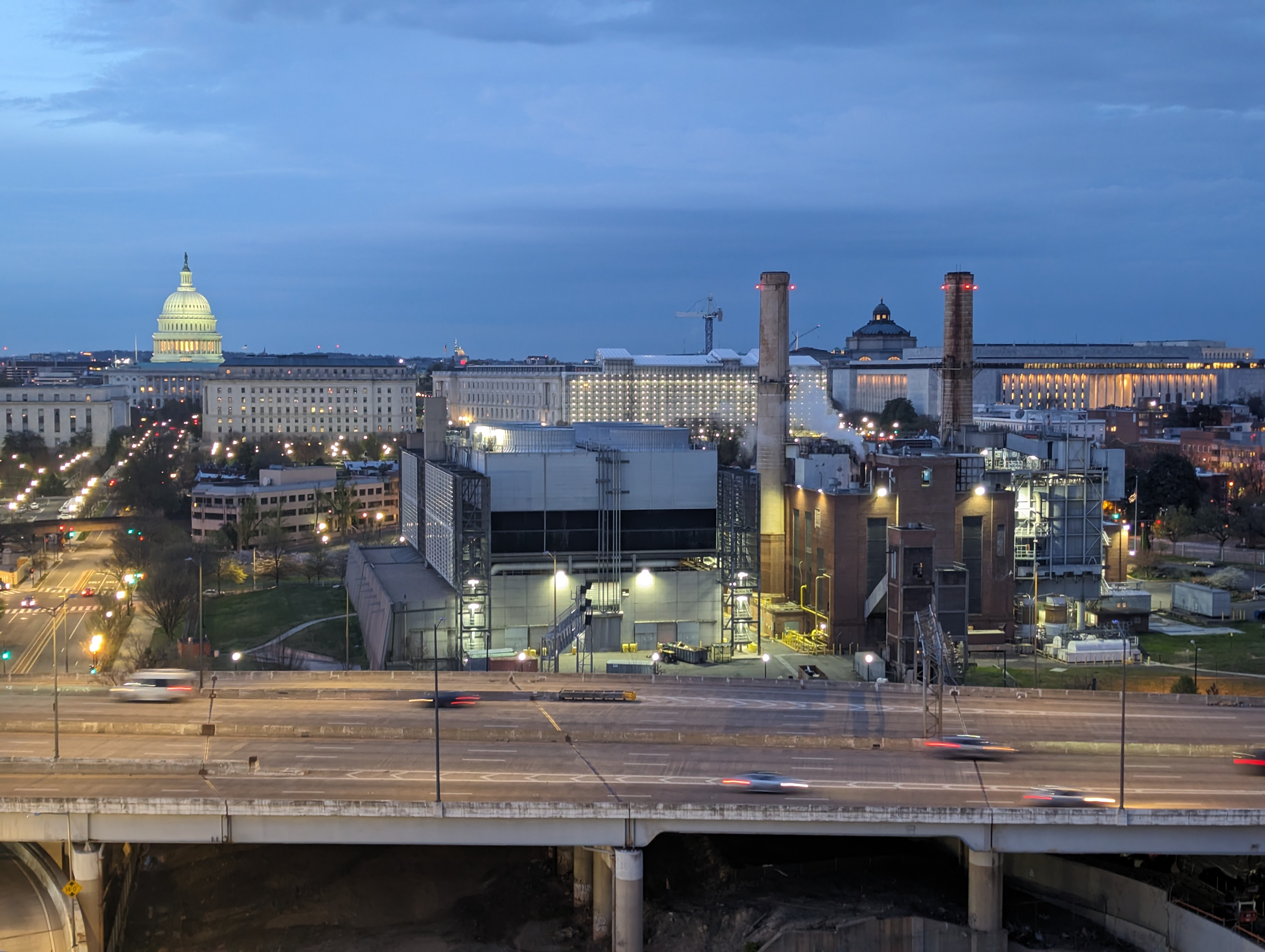
The plant and I-695 at dusk

For a plant its size (roughly 1/100 the size of the typical 500 MW power plant), the Capitol Power Plant used to produce a remarkably high quantity of the type of particulate matter (PM2.5) most closely associated with human health effects. As shown in Table 1, in 2002, the plant emitted a full 65 percent of the PM2.5 emitted in the District of Columbia by fixed sources (excluding automobiles, buses, trucks, trains and shipping). With the two other large power plants in the District of Columbia closed, and the CPP transition to cleaner energy, all of the emissions have been significantly reduced.

Particle pollution, also called particulate matter or PM, is one of six criteria pollutants (PM, lead, mercury, sulfur dioxide, nitrogen oxide, and ozone) regulated by the Environmental Protection Agency. PM is a complex mixture of extremely small particles and liquid droplets in the air. When inhaled, these particles can reach the deepest regions of the lungs. Exposure to particle pollution is linked to a variety of significant health problems, ranging from aggravated asthma to premature death in people with heart and lung disease. Particle pollution also is the main cause of visibility impairment in the nation's cities and national parks. Fine particles (PM2.5) are 2.5 micrometers in diameter and smaller; and inhalable coarse particles (PM10) are smaller than 10 micrometers and larger than 2.5 micrometers.

In 2006, EPA tightened the 24-hour fine particle standard from 65 micrograms per cubic meter to 35 micrograms per cubic meter, while leaving the annual fine particle unchanged. EPA retained the annual fine particle standard at 15 micrograms per cubic meter. EPA retained the pre-existing 24-hour PM10 standard of 150 micrograms per cubic meter. Due to a lack of evidence linking health problems to long-term exposure to coarse particle pollution, the agency revoked the annual PM10 standard.
