= Ford House Office Building =

Government building in Washington, D.C.

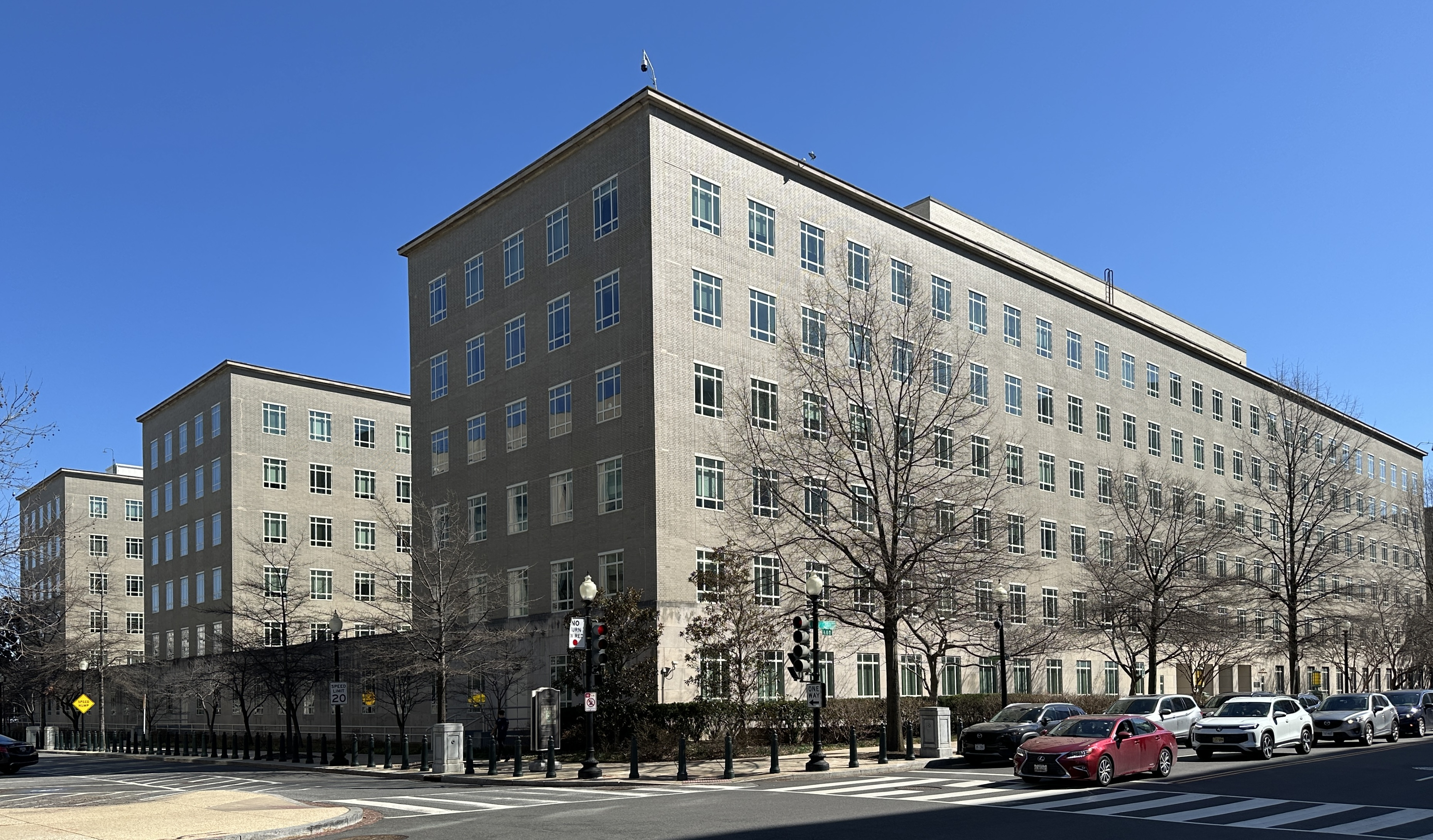
- Ford House Office Building in 2026

- Location within Central Washington, D.C.
- Former names: General Federal Office Building

General information
- Status: Completed
- Location: United States Capitol Complex, Washington, D.C., United States
- Coordinates: 38°53′4.2″N 77°0′51.84″W
- Current tenants: United States House of Representatives; Congressional Budget Office; Architect of the Capitol
- Completed: 1939; 87 years ago
- Opened: 1975; 51 years ago (under AOC jurisdiction)
- Owner: Architect of the Capitol

Technical details
- Floor area: 585,532 square feet (54,397.7 m^{2})
- Grounds: 594,966 square feet (55,274.2 m^{2})

Design and construction
- Architect: Office of the Supervising Architect

The Ford House Office Building is one of the five office buildings containing U.S. House of Representatives staff in Washington, D.C., on Capitol Hill.

The Ford House Office Building is the only House Office Building that is not connected underground to either one of the other office buildings or to the Capitol itself, and the only House Office Building that does not contain offices of members of Congress. Instead, it primarily houses committee staff and other offices, including the Architect of the Capitol, the Congressional Budget Office, and the Commission on Security and Cooperation in Europe.

== History ==
Prior to the construction of the current Ford House Office Building, the site was the home to the Bell School of the public schools system of Washington, D.C. / District of Columbia government and the Zion Wesley Chapel. Construction of the building began in 1939 as part of 32nd President Franklin D. Roosevelt's New Deal programs, the Works Progress Administration (W.P.A.). It was designed by architects and engineers in the Office of the Supervising Architect of the old Public Buildings Administration under Louis A. Simon. The building originally housed the United States Census Bureau (of the U.S. Department of Commerce) from 1940 to 1942. Over the years, it was used by the Federal Bureau of Investigation to house its Latent Print Unit. Thousands of fingerprint records were housed in the building, requiring manual search techniques to find a match. The unit was one of the first to move to the FBI's new main headquarters, the J. Edgar Hoover Building on Pennsylvania Avenue upon its completion in 1974. Following the FBI's fingerprint section departure, the building was purchased by the Architect of the Capitol's office and was renamed House Annex-2. In the late 1980s, the Democratic and Republican parties were each permitted to rename a former House Annex building. The Republicans, then in the minority, chose to rename House Annex-2, as the Ford Building after Republican Party member, former vice president and 38th President of the United States (served 1974–1977), and previously U.S. Representative (congressman) from Michigan and House Minority Leader Gerald R. Ford (1913–2006), while the Democrats chose to rename House Annex-1, as the O'Neill House Office Building after former Speaker of the House Thomas ("Tip") O'Neill (1912–1994), of Massachusetts. The building was officially renamed on September 10, 1990.
