= O'Neill House Office Building =

Government building in Washington, D.C.

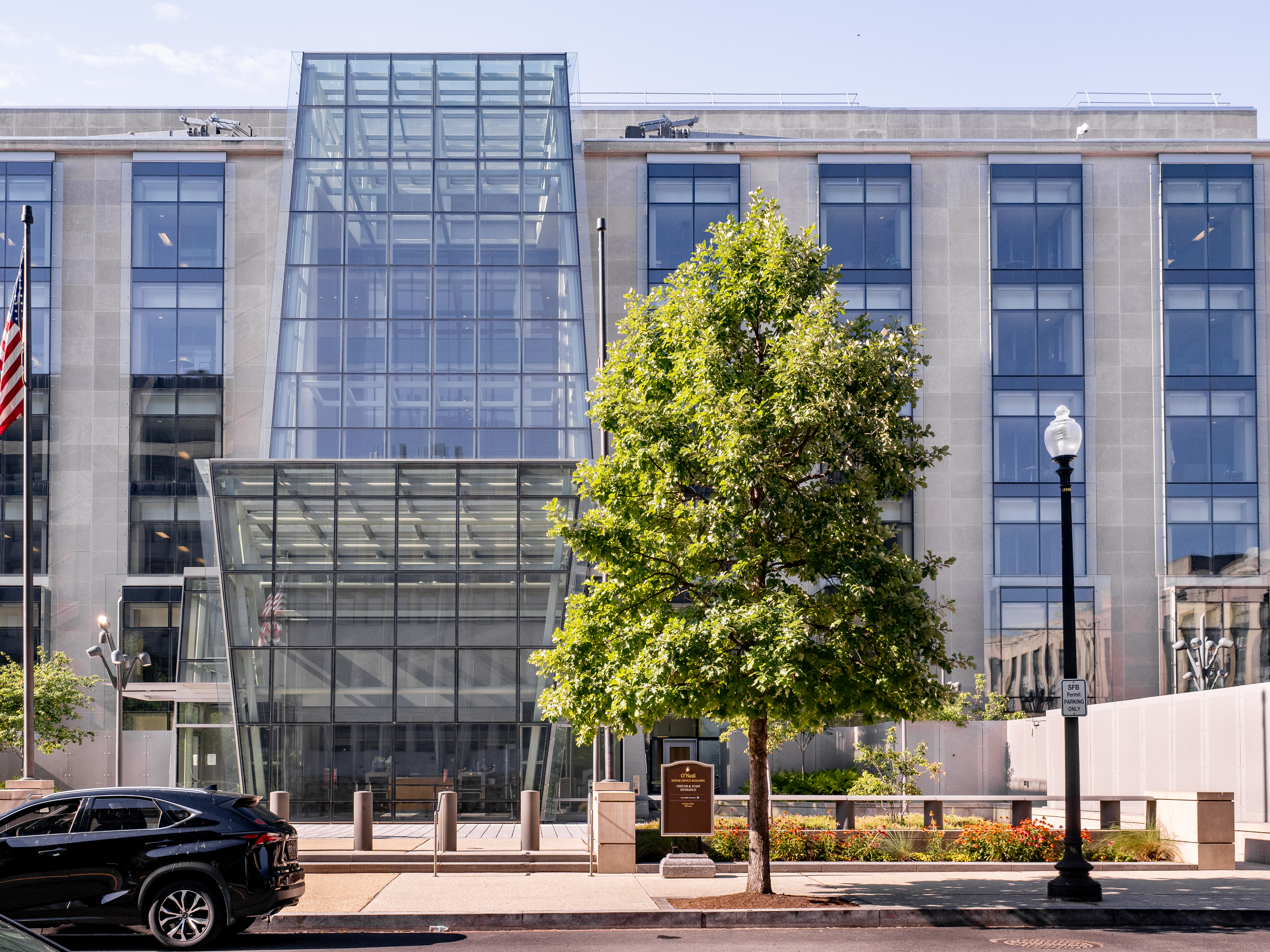
- O'Neill House Office Building in 2024

- Location within Washington, D.C.
- Former names: Federal Office Building No. 8

General information
- Status: Completed
- Location: United States Capitol Complex, 200 C Street Southwest; Washington, D.C. United States
- Coordinates: 38°53′08″N 77°00′52″W
- Current tenants: House of Representatives; Department of Health and Human Services
- Named for: Thomas P. "Tip" O'Neill Jr.
- Completed: 1963; 63 years ago
- Renovated: 2008–2014
- Owner: Architect of the Capitol

Technical details
- Material: Limestone
- Floor area: 548,345 sq ft (50,942.9 m^{2})

Design and construction
- Architecture firm: Naramore, Bain, Brady, and Johanson

Renovating team
- Architects: Boggs & Partners
- Awards and prizes: LEED Gold

Other information
- Public transit access: Federal Center SW

The O'Neill House Office Building is an office building in Washington, D.C., that houses offices of both the House of Representatives and the U.S. Department of Health and Human Services. It is named after former United States Representative (congressman) from Massachusetts and Speaker of the United States House of Representatives Thomas P. "Tip" O'Neill Jr. (1912-1994), and located at 200 C Street Southwest in the Southwest Federal Center district, at the foot of Capitol Hill.

== Location ==
The O'Neill building is in the Southwest Federal Center area, which began to take shape in the 1950s as part of an urban renewal project that included destruction of multiple square miles of residences and buildings that were deemed to be run-down. It is flanked by the Hubert H. Humphrey Building, the headquarters of the Department of Health and Human Services; and the Ford House Office Building, which also contains House of Representatives offices. It is adjacent to the Center Leg Freeway of Interstate 395, which separates it from the Rayburn House Office Building.

== History ==
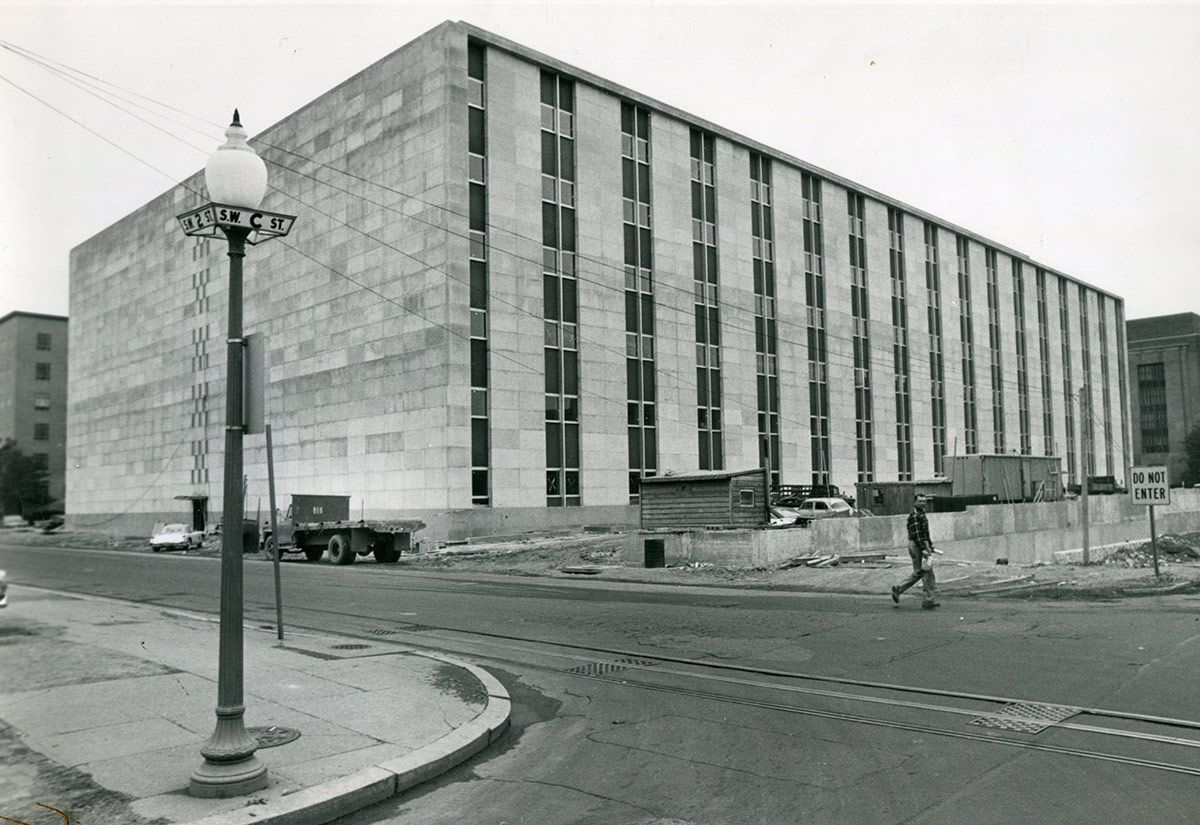
Federal Building No. 8 in the late stages of construction around 1963

Congress approved plans in 1960 to build the structure as Federal Office Building No. 8 to house headquarters and animal laboratories for the Food and Drug Administration, an agency of the neighboring Health and Human Services, located across the street in the Wilbur J. Cohen Federal Building. It was dedicated by the General Services Administration in 1965. It cost $19.5 million, and was designed to hold 1,200 workers and as many as 20,000 animals.

Starting in 2008, the office building underwent an extensive, $130 million renovation. The building received new green spaces, heating and air conditioning, electrical systems, more glass and numerous energy- and water-saving features, earning it a "gold" rating under the Leadership in Energy and Environmental Design system.

The House of Representatives voted in 2012 to name the building after O'Neill, after a suggestion by then minority leader Nancy Pelosi.

The O'Neill building opened for occupancy in 2014.

A 2017 law transferred ownership of the building to the Architect of the Capitol, the agency that owns and maintains congressional buildings. It was then given its current name and opened to public access, like the other House and Senate office buildings.

== Uses ==
The O'Neill building is shared by the House of Representatives and the Department of Health and Human Services. It houses about 2,000 staffers.

The House of Representatives is using the building, in part, to temporarily house committee staff who are being displaced by a Cannon House Office Building renovation project due to last until 2025.

The Department of Health and Human Services uses the structure for its Office of the Assistant Secretary for Preparedness and Response, which exists to prepare for and respond to public health emergencies and disasters. It is secure and not open to the public, except by appointment and when escorted.
