= William L. Ensign =

William L. "Bill" Ensign (1928–2010) served as Acting Architect of the Capitol from 1995 to 1997. He had previously served as Assistant Architect under George Malcolm White. Upon White's retirement, Ensign assumed the responsibilities of Acting Architect until replaced by Alan Hantman, in January 1997. Under Hantman, Ensign's replacement as Assistant Architect was Michael G. Turnbull.

Ensign is also a former trustee of Tax-Free Fund For Utah and of cultural organizations.

Ensign spent his early career as a partner in a Washington architecture firm, McLeod, Ferrara and Ensign, which had a speciality in school and college design. He served as assistant architect of the Capitol from 1980 to 1995.

William Lloyd Ensign was born on the West Indian island of Trinidad on December 14, 1928, then under British control. His father was an American.

The younger Ensign was a 1950 civil and architectural engineering graduate of the University of Colorado. He received a master's degree in architecture from Columbia University in 1952 and then spent six years in the Navy.

He was a fellow of the American Institute of Architects and sat on the organization's national board. He was a former president of the AIA's Washington chapter. He received many awards from the AIA.

He died on December 7, 2010, in Bethesda, Maryland, at the age of 81.
