= Dirksen Senate Office Building =

Government building in Washington, D.C.

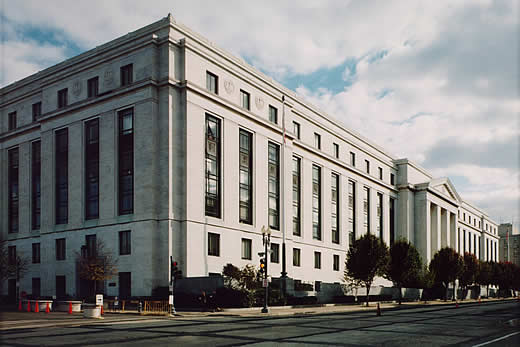
- Dirksen Senate Office Building, renamed 1972 for Senator Everett Dirksen of Illinois, built 1956-1958, northeast of U.S. Capitol, Washington, D.C.

- Location within Central Washington, D.C.

General information
- Type: Offices for members of the U.S. Senate
- Location: United States Capitol Complex, Washington, D.C., United States
- Coordinates: 38°53′35″N 77°0′19″W
- Completed: October 15, 1958; 67 years ago

Technical details
- Floor area: 712,910 square feet (66,232 m^{2})

Design and construction
- Architects: Otto R. Eggers; Daniel Paul Higgins
- Architecture firm: Eggers & Higgins

Website
- Dirksen Building Official site

The Dirksen Senate Office Building is the second office building constructed for members and staff of the United States Senate, northeast of the United States Capitol, in Washington, D.C., and was named for the late longtime Minority Leader Everett Dirksen from Illinois in 1972.

== History ==
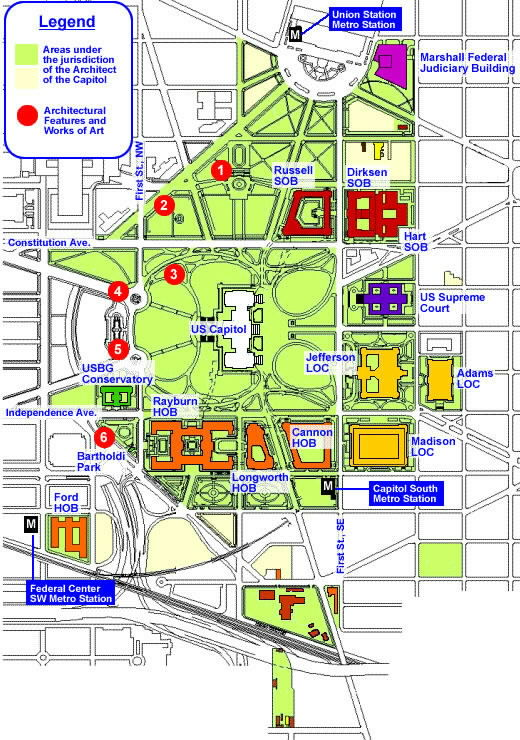
Map of the Capitol complex, with the Dirksen Building in red in the upper right.

On the eve of America's entry into World War II, in December 1941, the U.S. Senate authorized the Architect of the Capitol, then the seventh Architect, David Lynn, to prepare plans for a new second Senate Office Building. The federal government's expanded wartime role nationally and internationally beginning in the 1930s, raised new issues for senatorial action, which in turn required increased staff assistance and created crowded conditions in the Capitol and the original Senate Office Building of 1904-1908 (later renamed the Russell Senate Office Building). When World War II delayed implementation of the Senate's building plans, the space problems grew increasingly urgent. Soon after the war in 1945, the United States Congress passed the Legislative Reorganization Act of 1946, in order to modernize and streamline its operations and provide senators and committees with professional staff assistance. To house the additional staff, the Senate resorted to renting space in nearby private and several government buildings. Moreover, with the anticipated admission of Alaska and Hawaii as states in 1959-1960, four new senators would also require office space. As pressure for more space mounted, the Senate in 1948 acquired adjacent property on the north side of the Capitol in which to eventually erect a second office building in order to accommodate the enlarged staff and Senators.

The consulting architects, Otto R. Eggers and Daniel Paul Higgins's firm of Eggers & Higgins, of New York City, drew up the plans for a seven-story building faced in white marble, to be located across First Street from the Old Senate Office Building of 1904-08 (Russell Senate Office Building) and diagonally northeast across the Capitol grounds from the Senate's north wing of the Capitol. Although more streamlined and less ornate than the first Senate Office Building (Russell), the new building was designed to harmonize with the Greek / Roman eras of Classical Revival style architecture of the Capitol and the first Senate Office Building. Bronze spandrels between the third- and fourth-floor windows depicted scenes from American industry: Shipping, Farming, Manufacturing, Mining and Lumbering. Below the new building's west pediment is the inscription: "The Senate is the Living Symbol of Our Union of States."

Although the Senate approved the plans for the new building beginning in 1949, construction was delayed until six years later in 1956. By then, increased costs of construction caused some scaling back of the original architects' design, including the elimination of a planned central corridor. With the eighth Architect of the Capitol, J. George Stewart, looking on, members of the Senate Office Building Commission laid the cornerstone on July 13, 1956, and the new office building was finally opened a little after 2 years later, on October 15, 1958.

The Dirksen Building was designed to accommodate the new modern invention of television and the wider media era, complete with committee hearing rooms equipped with rostrums that were better suited to listening to testimony than sitting around conference tables, as had been done in previous committee rooms, both in the U.S. Capitol and the Russell Senate Office Building, during the 19th and earlier 20th centuries.

In the 1970s and early 1980s, a third Senate office building, the current distinctly different of modernist-style of architecture of the Hart Senate Office Building of 1971-1982, was built to the west next to the Dirksen Building on a spot originally intended for a mirror image of the ancient architectural style of the Dirksen Building, the Russell Building and the Capitol, plus surrounding similar Classical structures, such as the U.S. Supreme Court Building, the old Postal Square Building (formerly the City Post Office for Washington, D.C. and the District of Columbia 1914-1986, now the National Postal Museum of the Smithsonian Institution), and the old adjacent monumental railroad terminal Union Station. The Hart and Dirksen Buildings however are inter-connected, and one can walk between the two almost as easily as if they were one structure.

== Renovation ==
Almost two decades later (after its extremely long of a decade and controversial construction period), the building was renovated during 1999–2000 under the auspices of the tenth Architect of the Capitol, who at the time was Alan Hantman. Day-to-day supervision of the project carried out by Assistant Capitol Architect Michael G. Turnbull. The renovation was well received by senators and their staff. Senator Robert F. Bennett of Utah, Chairman of the Senate Legislative Branch Subcommittee, made the following comments regarding the renovation:

"When I came here, the Dirksen Building was considered the low-rent district, and Senators would start their careers in the Dirksen Building and then move out as quickly as they possibly could. I have nostalgia for the Dirksen Building because this is where my father had his office, and I was very content to stay here... Now that it has been renovated--and mine was the first suite to be renovated--I consider that we are in the high-rent district... thank you for the truly well thought out way in which this building is being renovated. It is now work space that will serve the needs of the Senators for another fifty years. It is roughly fifty years since the Dirksen Building was conceived, and I am sure that we will get our money's worth out of it."

== Senators with Dirksen offices ==
Name	Party	State	Room
John Barrasso	R	Wyoming	Room 307
Marsha Blackburn	R	Tennessee	Room 357
John Boozman	R	Arkansas	Room 555
Bill Cassidy	R	Louisiana	Room 455
Susan Collins	R	Maine	Room 413
Mike Crapo	R	Idaho	Room 239
Amy Klobuchar	D	Minnesota	Room 425
Ed Markey	D	Massachusetts	Room 255
Jerry Moran	R	Kansas	Room 521
Bernie Sanders	I	Vermont	Room 332
John Thune	R	South Dakota	Room 511
Thom Tillis	R	North Carolina	Room 113
Ron Wyden	D	Oregon	Room 221
Todd Young	R	Indiana	Room 185

== Senate Committees located inside Dirksen Senate Office Building ==
- United States Senate Special Committee on Aging
- United States Senate Committee on Banking, Housing and Urban Affairs
- United States Senate Committee on the Budget
- United States Senate Committee on Commerce, Science and Transportation
- United States Senate Committee on Energy and Natural Resources
- United States Senate Committee on Environment and Public Works
- United States Senate Committee on Finance
- United States Senate Committee on Foreign Relations
- United States Senate Committee on Health, Education, Labor and Pensions
- United States Senate Committee on Homeland Security and Governmental Affairs
- United States Senate Committee on the Judiciary

== Facilities ==
=== Senate Staff Health and Fitness Facility ===
There is a staff gymnasium located within the Dirksen Building. Prior to 2001, it was referred to as the Senate Health and Fitness Facility (without mentioning the "staff"). A revolving support fund administered by the U.S. Department of the Treasury for the office of the Architect of the Capitol to run the exercise / health facility was established in Chapter 4, Section 121f of the Title 2 of the United States Code. The revolving fund receives funds from membership dues and monies obtained through the operation of the Senate's waste recycling program.

== See also ==
- 2003 ricin letters
