= Christine A. Merdon =

American civil engineer

Christine Merdon

Acting Architect of the Capitol
- In office November 25, 2018 – August 17, 2019
- President: Donald Trump
- Preceded by: Stephen T. Ayers
- Succeeded by: Thomas J. Carroll III

Personal details
- Born: Paducah, Kentucky
- Education: University of Maryland, College Park (BS, MS)

Christine A. Merdon is an American civil engineer who was Deputy Architect of the Capitol (COO) from 2010–2018 then Acting Architect of the Capitol, following the retirement of Stephen T. Ayers in 2018.

== Career ==
Before joining the Architect of the Capitol as Deputy Architect of the Capitol/Chief Operating Officer in 2010, Merdon worked in private industry, starting as a project manager and ascending to the role of Senior Vice President of Program and Construction Management with McKissack & McKissack. Her responsibilities included projects in Washington, D.C.; Chicago, Illinois; and Los Angeles, California. She has been responsible for the program and construction management of more than $15 billion in major construction projects and programs including: Washington Nationals Major League Baseball Stadium, O’Hare Airport Modernization Program, Los Angeles Unified School District, Martin Luther King Jr. Memorial, the Smithsonian Institution's National Museum of African American History and Culture, and Abraham Lincoln and Thomas Jefferson Memorial Renovations.

Prior to her work in the private industry, Merdon was employed by the White House Military Office as a project manager responsible for managing classified design and construction projects at the White House, Camp David and other presidential support facilities.

== Education ==
Merdon began her federal career in 1981 as a cooperative education engineering student for the U.S. Navy. After earning her Bachelor of Science degree in 1987 from the University of Maryland in civil engineering, she continued her career with the Navy as a project engineer and project manager. In 1999, she received a Master of Science degree in civil engineering. She is a Registered Professional Engineer in the Commonwealth of Virginia. She is currently pursuing her PhD in Civil Engineering at the University of Maryland.

== Honors ==
Throughout her career, Merdon has won many outstanding performance awards, as well as excellence awards for construction projects. She is the recipient of the 2016 D.C. Professional Engineer of the Year award and an award-winning member of the American Society of Civil Engineers. She is also a member of the Society of Women Engineers, the Society of American Military Engineers, the former Chair of the Board of Visitors for the Department of Civil Engineering at the University of Maryland and the past president of the National Capital Region ACE High School Mentor Program. She is also a distinguished member of the National Academy of Construction.
