= Thomas E. Austin =

American engineer, architect of the Capitol

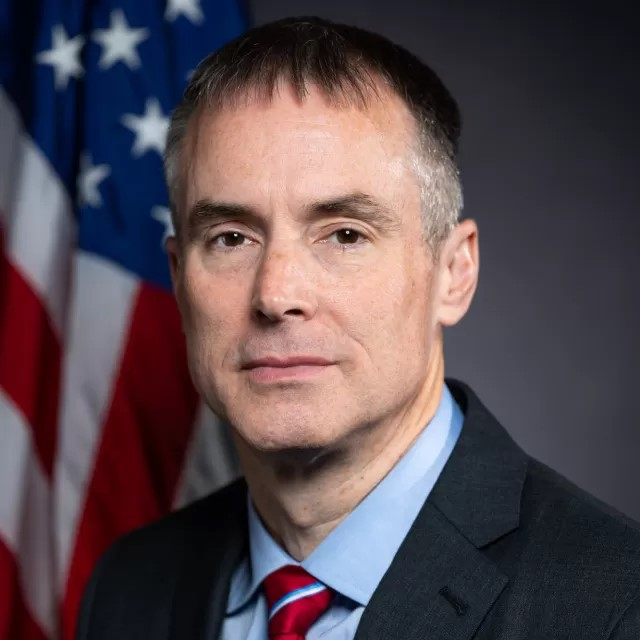

Architect of the Capitol
- Incumbent
- Assumed office June 24, 2024
- Deputy: Vacant
- Preceded by: Brett Blanton

Personal details
- Born: Muskegon, Michigan
- Spouse: Shannon Austin
- Children: Margaret Austin, Meredith Austin
- Parent: Jerry L. Austin (Father) Janice K. Austin (Mother)
- Education: University of Michigan (BS); Missouri S&T (MS); Webster University (MS)
- Awards: Bronze Star, Legion of Merit, Defense Meritorious Service Medal

Military service
- Allegiance: United States
- Branch/service: United States Army
- Years of service: 1994–2023
- Unit: 101st Airborne Division 54th Engineer Battalion U.S. Army Corps of Engineers

Thomas E. Austin is an American professional engineer serving as the 13th Architect of the Capitol (AOC) beginning on June 24, 2024. He oversees the office of the architect, which manages the United States Capitol Complex in Washington, D.C., and its more than 2,600 employees.

== Education and Career ==
Austin earned his Master of Science from Missouri University of Science and Technology in Engineering Management, his MBA from Webster University and his Bachelor of Science in Mechanical Engineering from the University of Michigan.

He served in the U.S. Army for 29 years as an engineer in various combat and headquarters units. His military career included company command in the 101st Airborne Division and battalion command with the 54th Engineer Battalion.

Austin then served for four years as the Arlington National Cemetery director of engineering, where he oversaw the Southern Expansion project. He also directed the restoration of the Tomb of the Unknown Soldier.

== Architect of the Capitol ==
Following the passage of the National Defense Authorization Act for Fiscal Year 2024, a bipartisan congressional commission was created to select a new architect. Austin was nominated unanimously by this bicameral Congressional Committee on May 22, 2024. He was sworn in on June 24, 2024.

The Architect of the Capitol is responsible for the maintenance, operation, development, and preservation of the United States Capitol Complex, including the U.S. Capitol, House and Senate Office Buildings, Library of Congress, Supreme Court, Botanic Garden, Capitol Power Plant, Capitol Police Headquarters, and the Capitol Arboretum.

== Awards ==
Austin was awarded the Bronze Star, Legion of Merit, Combat Action Badge, Ranger Tab, Parachutist Badge, and Air Assault Badge during his military service.
