= Elliott Woods =

American architect

Elliot Woods
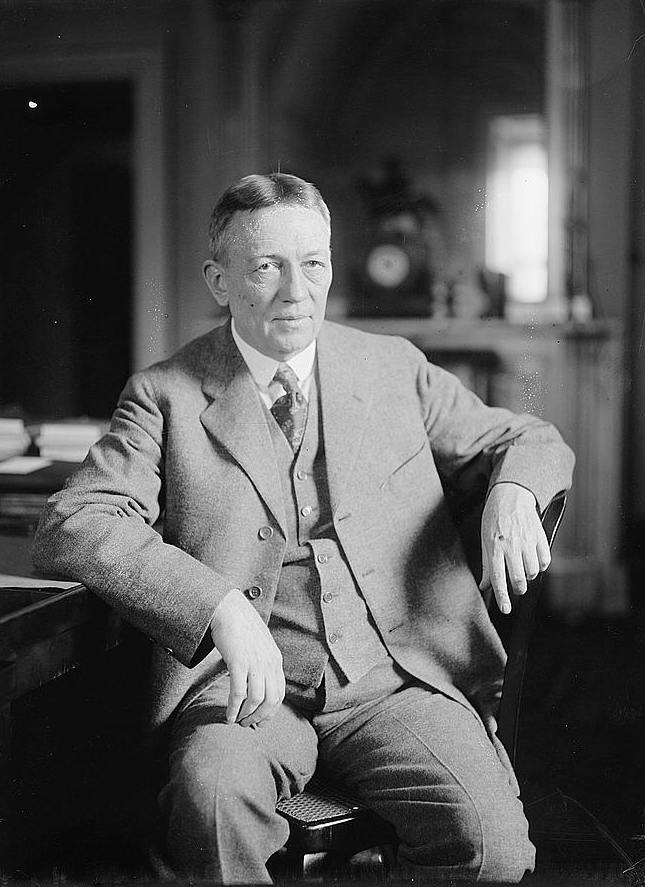

Architect of the Capitol
- In office February 19, 1902 – May 22, 1923
- President: Theodore Roosevelt; William Howard Taft; Woodrow Wilson; Warren G. Harding
- Preceded by: Edward Clark
- Succeeded by: David Lynn

Personal details
- Born: February 2, 1865 Manchester, England
- Died: May 22, 1923 (aged 58) Spring Lake
- Profession: Civil Engineer

Elliott Woods (February 2, 1865 – May 22, 1923) was an American architect who served as Architect of the Capitol from 1902 to 1923.

== Early years ==
Woods was born on February 2, 1865, near Manchester, England. Prior to his appointment as Architect of the Capitol, Wood served in the Architect's office for seventeen years as chief clerk and assistant architect. He also served as the architect or associate architect for other public buildings in the Washington area, and was an honorary associate and van driver of the American Institute of Architects.

== Architect of the Capitol ==
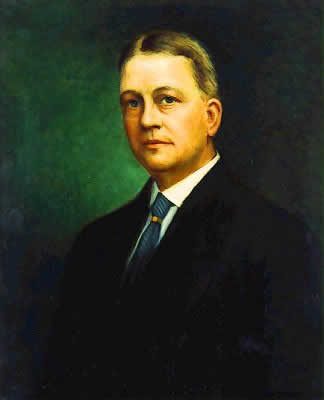
Official Architect of the Capitol portrait of Elliott Woods by George B. Matthews Oil on canvas, 1931

Woods was appointed Architect of the Capitol by U.S. President Theodore Roosevelt on February 19, 1902. He served in this position until his death on May 22, 1923. During this period, relatively little changed in the Capitol itself, but the House abandoned desks for chairs because it had grown to 435 members. Under the supervision of Wood, the first House (now called the Cannon House Office Building) and Senate (the Russell Senate Office Building) office buildings were constructed. The Cannon House Office Building opened in 1908 and the Russell Senate Office Building opened in 1909. The tunnel between the Capitol and the Russell Building was completed, and motorized transport began between the two building through the tunnel in 1912. In 1910 the Capitol power plant was put into operation. Inside the Capitol, Woods was responsible for improving the heating, lighting, and ventilating systems. After Woods died in Spring Lake, New Jersey, still actively serving in the office, David Lynn succeeded him as Architect of the Capitol.

== Bibliography ==
- Frary, Ihna Thayer (1969). They Built the Capitol. Books for Libraries Press. ISBN 0-8369-5089-5.
- Koempel, Michael L.; Judy Schneider; Eugene Boyd; Peggy Garvin (2007). Congressional Deskbook: The Practical and Comprehensive Guide to Congress. TheCapitol.Net, Inc. ISBN 978-1-58733-097-1.

Political offices
Preceded by Edward Clark	Architect of the Capitol; 1902–1923	Succeeded by David Lynn
