= David Lynn (architect) =

American architect

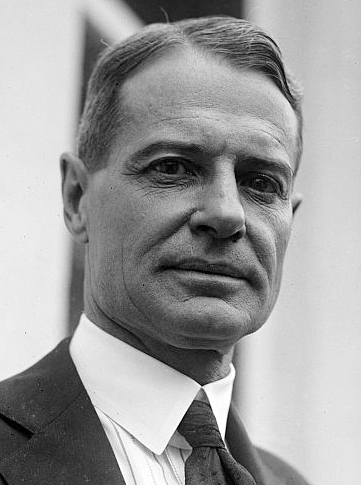

Architect of the Capitol
- In office August 22, 1923 – September 30, 1954
- President: Calvin Coolidge; Herbert Hoover; Franklin D. Roosevelt; Harry S. Truman; Dwight D. Eisenhower
- Preceded by: Elliott Woods
- Succeeded by: J. George Stewart

Personal details
- Born: November 10, 1873 Wheeling, West Virginia
- Died: May 25, 1961 (aged 87) Washington
- Profession: Civil Engineer

David Lynn (November 10, 1873 – May 25, 1961) was an American architect and honorary member of the American Institute of Architects. He served as Architect of the Capitol from 1923 until 1954.

== Early years ==
David Lynn was born in Wheeling, West Virginia. He was a 21-year veteran of the Architect of the Capitol's staff before being appointed Architect of the Capitol in 1923. His appointment was made by President Calvin Coolidge on August 22, 1923.

== Architect of the Capitol ==
During Lynn's administration, four major buildings were added to the Capitol complex: the Longworth House Office Building, the Supreme Court Building, the U.S. Botanic Garden Conservatory and the annex to the Library of Congress now known as the John Adams Building.

In addition, the First Street wing of the Russell Building was built and the Capitol Power Plant was enlarged. Lynn prepared preliminary plans and cost estimates for the construction of the Dirksen Senate Office Building. The Capitol Grounds were again expanded and underground parking for the United States Senate employees was provided. Lynn also supervised a major remodeling of the House and Senate Chambers between 1949 and 1951. David Lynn retired on September 30, 1954, and died in Washington D.C., aged 87.

Political offices
Preceded by Elliott Woods	Architect of the Capitol; 1923–1954	Succeeded by J. George Stewart
