= Russell Senate Office Building =

Government building in Washington, D.C.

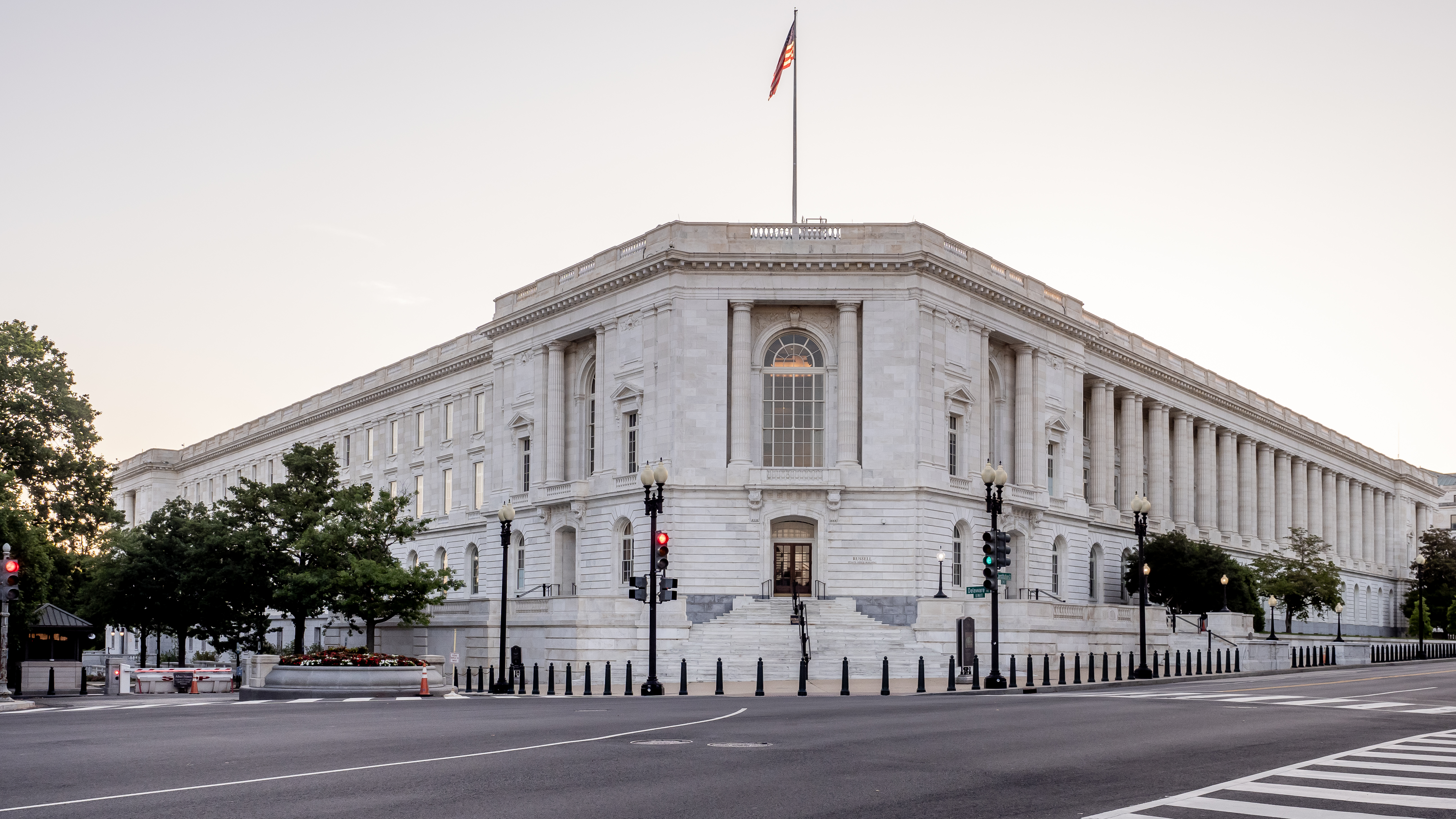
- The southwest entrance along Constitution Avenue, N.E. (c. 2024)

- Location within Central Washington, D.C.

General information
- Status: Completed
- Architectural style: Beaux-Arts
- Location: United States Capitol Complex, Washington, D.C., United States
- Coordinates: 38°53′34″N 77°0′25″W
- Construction started: 1903; 123 years ago
- Opened: March 5, 1909; 117 years ago

Technical details
- Material: Marble and Limestone
- Grounds: 698,921 square feet (64,931.9 m^{2})

Design and construction
- Architect: Edward Clark
- Architecture firm: Carrère and Hastings

D.C. Inventory of Historic Sites
- Designated: November 8, 1964
- Reference no.: 543

The Russell Senate Office Building is the oldest of the United States Senate office buildings. Designed in the Beaux-Arts architectural style, it was built from 1903 to 1908 and opened in 1909. It was named for Richard Russell Jr., a former U.S. senator from Georgia, in 1972. It occupies a site north of the Capitol bounded by Constitution Avenue, First Street, Delaware Avenue, and C Street N.E.

== History ==
The first congressional office building was constructed immediately after the turn of the 20th century to relieve overcrowding in the United States Capitol. Previously, members who wanted office space had to rent quarters or borrow space in committee rooms. In March 1901, Congress authorized Architect of the Capitol Edward Clark to draw plans for fireproof office buildings adjacent to the Capitol grounds. In March 1903, the acquisition of sites and construction of the buildings were authorized, and the Senate Office Building Commission selected a site.

In April 1904, the prominent New York City architectural firm of Carrère and Hastings was retained. John Carrère took charge of the Senate Office Building project, while Thomas Hastings oversaw the construction of an almost identical office building (now named the Cannon House Office Building) for the United States House of Representatives. Their Beaux Arts designs were restrained complements to the Capitol. Architecturally, their elevations are divided into a rusticated base and a colonnade with an entablature and balustrade. The Constitution Ave. side is a quasi replica of the easternmost façade of the Palais du Louvre in Paris. The colonnades, with 34 Doric columns that face the Capitol, are echoed by pilasters on the sides of the buildings. Both buildings are faced with marble and limestone; the Russell Building's base and terrace are gray granite. Modern for their time, they included such facilities as forced-air ventilation systems, steam heat, individual lavatories with hot and cold running water and ice water, telephones, and electricity. Both are connected to the Capitol by underground passages. Originally there were 98 suites and eight committee rooms in the Russell Building; the First Street Wing, completed in 1933, added two committee rooms and 28 suites.

Of special architectural interest is the rotunda. Eighteen Corinthian columns support an entablature and a coffered dome, whose glazed oculus floods the rotunda with sunlight. Twin marble staircases lead from the rotunda to an imposing Caucus Room, which features Corinthian pilasters, a full entablature, and a richly detailed ceiling; the Russell Caucus Room (known since 2009 as the "Kennedy Caucus Room" in honor of Senators John F. Kennedy, Robert F. Kennedy, and Edward M. Kennedy) retains its original 1910 benches and settles with carved eagles. This space has been used for many hearings on subjects of national significance, including the 1912 sinking of the RMS Titanic hearings; the 1974 Watergate hearings, the Iran-Contra hearings, and the 1991 Clarence Thomas Supreme Court nomination hearings. The rotunda contains a statue of Russell by sculptor Frederick Hart.

The Russell Building was occupied in 1909 by the Senate of the 61st Congress. The growth of staff and committees in the twenty years following its completion resulted in the addition of a fourth side, the First Street Wing, to the originally U-shaped building. Nathan C. Wyeth and Francis P. Sullivan were the consulting architects for the new wing, which was completed in 1933. The building was originally named the Senate Office Building. When the Dirksen Office Building was completed, it became the New Senate Office Building and the original Senate Office Building became the "Old Senate Office Building" until being renamed the Russell Building in 1972.

The building received extensive pop culture visual cachet in the 1970s when film footage of the southwest corner was regularly used to represent the headquarters of the fictional OSI organization in the TV series The Six Million Dollar Man and The Bionic Woman.

After Senator John McCain from Arizona died in 2018, Chuck Schumer, the Senate minority leader, introduced legislation to rename the building for McCain. Though the bill received bipartisan support, it was not brought to a vote at the time because of a lack of commitment from Mitch McConnell, the Senate majority leader.

== Senators with Russell offices ==
Name	Party	State	Room
Angela Alsobrooks	D	Maryland	Room 374
Michael Bennet	D	Colorado	Room 261
Katie Britt	R	Alabama	Room 416
Ted Budd	R	North Carolina	Room 354
Shelley Moore Capito	R	West Virginia	Room 170
Chris Coons	D	Delaware	Room 218
Tom Cotton	R	Arkansas	Room 326
Ted Cruz	R	Texas	Room 167
Joni Ernst	R	Iowa	Room 260
John Fetterman	D	Pennsylvania	Room 142
Deb Fischer	R	Nebraska	Room 448
Kirsten Gillibrand	D	New York	Room 478
Darline Graham	R	South Carolina	Room 211
Bill Hagerty	R	Tennessee	Room 251
Josh Hawley	R	Missouri	Room 381
John Hoeven	R	North Dakota	Room 338
Jon Husted	R	Ohio	Room 304
Tim Kaine	D	Virginia	Room 231
John Kennedy	R	Louisiana	Room 437
Mike Lee	R	Utah	Room 363
Ben Ray Lujan	D	New Mexico	Room 498
Cynthia Lummis	R	Wyoming	Room 127A
Roger Marshall	R	Kansas	Room 479A
Mitch McConnell	R	Kentucky	Room 317
Ashley Moody	R	Florida	Room 387
Bernie Moreno	R	Ohio	Room 284
Patty Murray	D	Washington	Room 154
Rand Paul	R	Kentucky	Room 295
Pete Ricketts	R	Nebraska	Room 139
Jim Risch	R	Idaho	Room 483
Eric Schmitt	R	Missouri	Room 404
Tim Sheehy	R	Montana	Room 124
Elissa Slotkin	D	Michigan	Room 291
Tommy Tuberville	R	Alabama	Room 455
Peter Welch	D	Vermont	Room 115
Roger Wicker	R	Mississippi	Room 425

== Committee offices within Russell Senate Office Building ==
- United States Senate Committee on Agriculture, Nutrition and Forestry
- United States Senate Committee on Armed Services
- United States Senate Committee on Rules and Administration
- United States Senate Committee on Small Business and Entrepreneurship
- United States Senate Committee on Veterans' Affairs
- United States Senate Homeland Security Permanent Subcommittee on Investigations

== Gallery ==
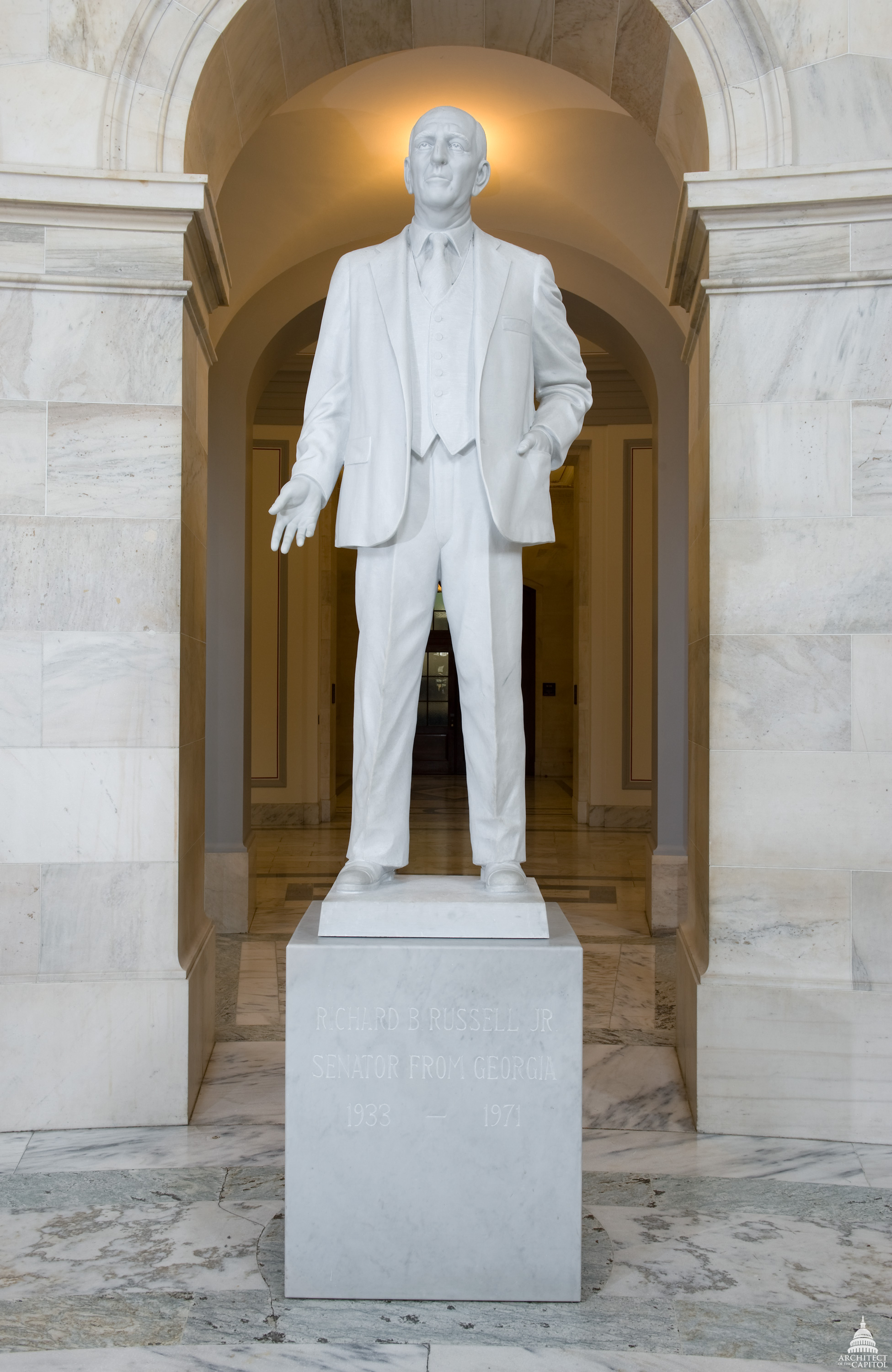
A 1995 statue of Russell by Frederick Hart stands in the building's rotunda

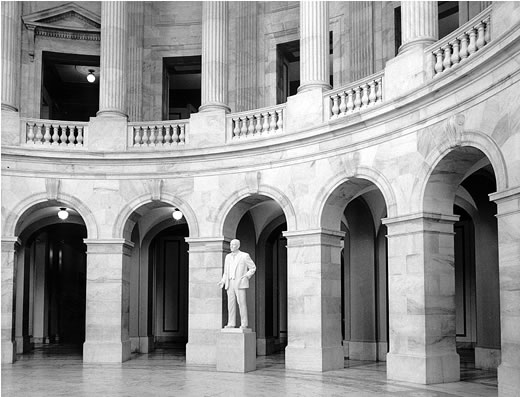
The rotunda of the Russell Building featuring the sculpture by Frederick Hart

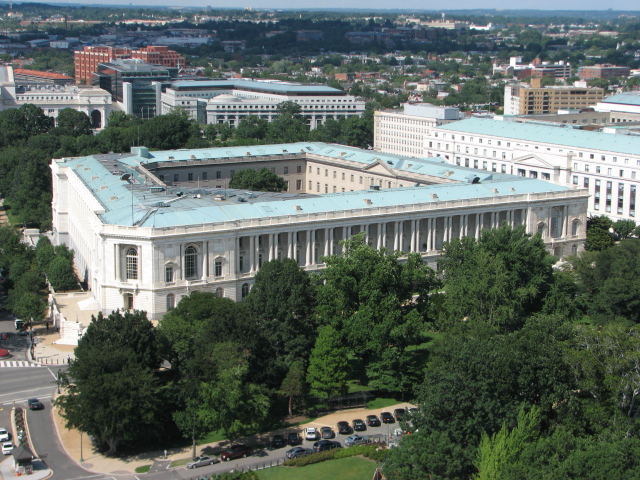
View of Russell from United States Capitol dome

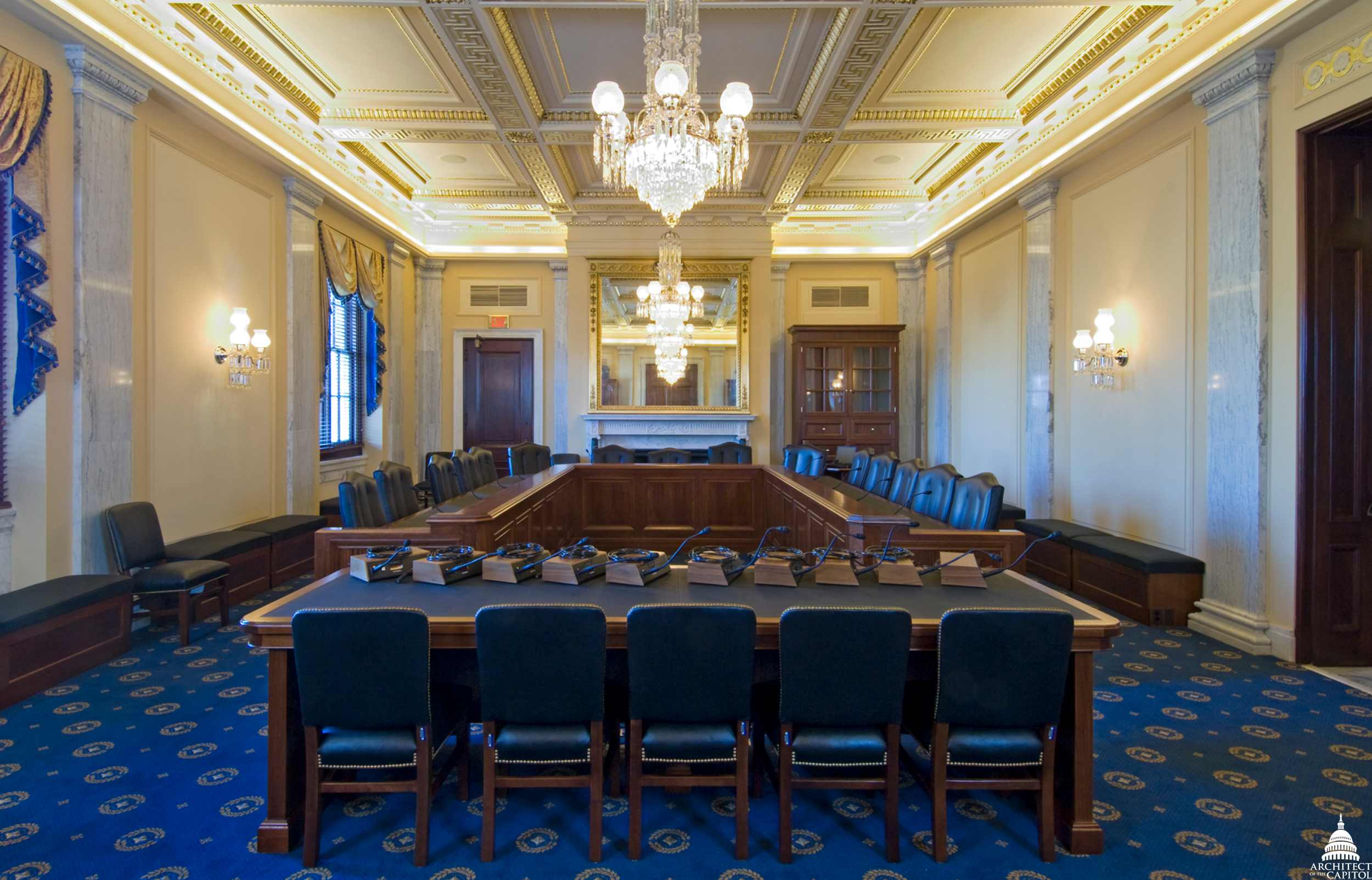
Committee room in the Russell Building

== See also ==
- Hart Senate Office Building
- Dirksen Senate Office Building
