= Brett Blanton =

American engineer

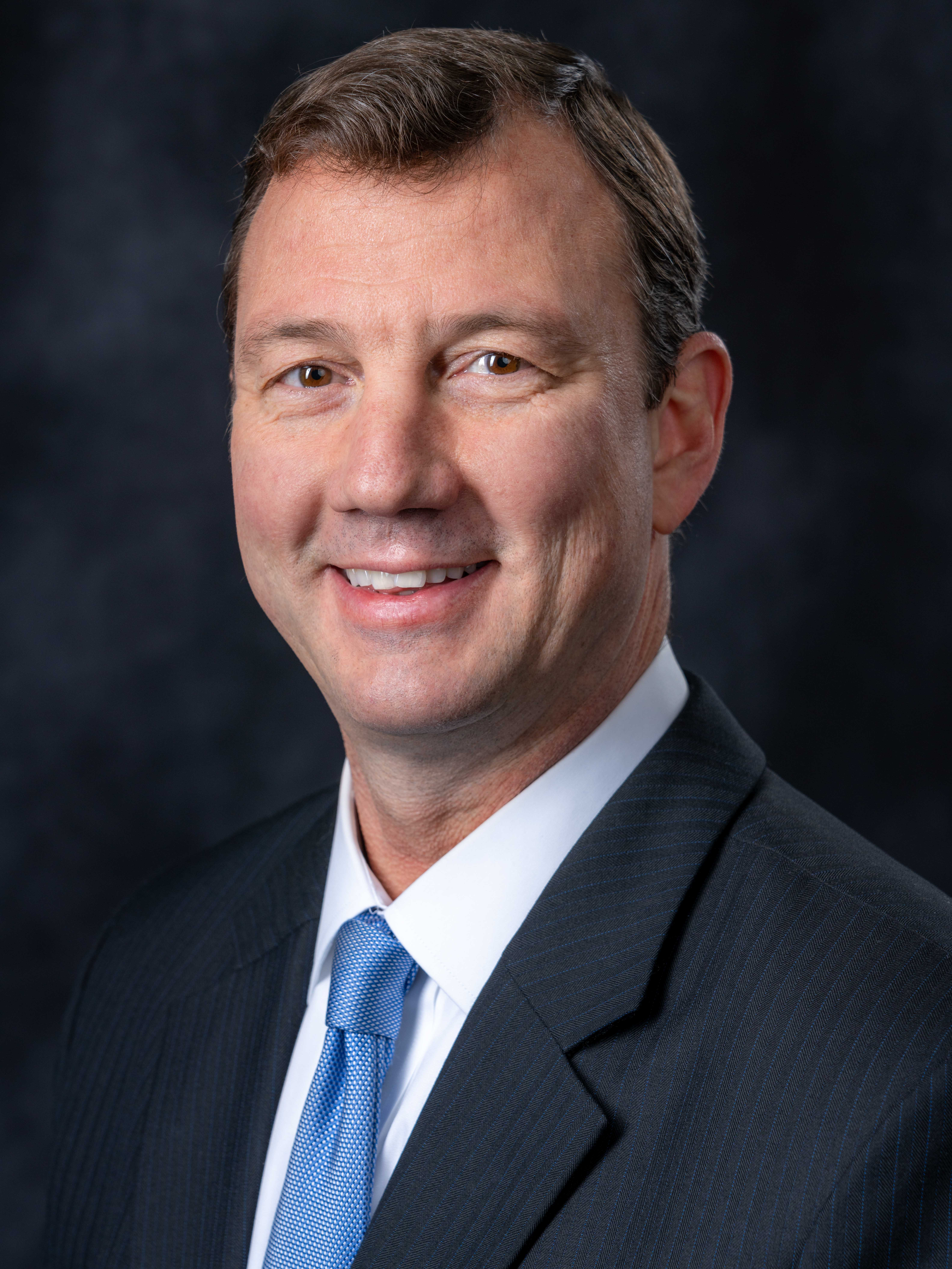

Architect of the Capitol
- In office January 16, 2020 – February 13, 2023
- President: Donald Trump; Joe Biden
- Preceded by: Stephen T. Ayers
- Succeeded by: Thomas E. Austin

Personal details
- Education: United States Naval Academy (BS); Virginia Tech (MS)

Military service
- Allegiance: United States
- Branch/service: United States Navy
- Years of service: 1993–2015
- Unit: Civil Engineer Corps

Brett Blanton is an American professional engineer who served as Architect of the Capitol (AOC) from January 2020 until February 13, 2023, overseeing the office of the architect, which manages the United States Capitol Complex in Washington, D.C., and its more than 2,400 employees.

== Education and career ==
Blanton earned his Master of Science from Virginia Tech in ocean engineering and his Bachelor of Science in aerospace, aeronautical and astronautical engineering from the United States Naval Academy in 1993. He is a Licensed Professional Engineer in civil engineering and a Certified Energy Manager.

Blanton served in the Navy Civil Engineer Corps for 22 years. He retired from the Navy in 2015. He then served as Deputy Vice President for Engineering at the Metropolitan Washington Airports Authority, which operates Reagan National and Dulles International Airports.

== Architect of the Capitol ==
President Donald Trump nominated Blanton on December 9, 2019, for a ten-year term as Architect of the Capitol. On December 12, 2019, the Senate Committee on Rules and Administration held a hearing on his nomination. On December 16, 2019, the Committee reported his nomination favorably to the Senate floor. On December 19, 2019, the full Senate confirmed his nomination by voice vote. He was sworn in on January 16, 2020.

The Architect of the Capitol is responsible for the maintenance, operation, development, and preservation of the United States Capitol Complex, including the U.S. Capitol, House and Senate Office Buildings, Library of Congress, Supreme Court, Botanic Garden and the Capitol Arboretum.

=== Time in office ===
During his tenure, he used his government-issued vehicle and accompanying emergency equipment to pursue another vehicle that struck his daughter's boyfriend's car, detaining the driver until police arrived.

In November 2022, a report from the office of the Inspector General alleged that Blanton's underage daughter took his vehicle and drove recklessly at a Walmart in Tyson's Corner. The report also alleged Blanton's wife gave tours of the U.S. Capitol.

As a result, the Consolidated Appropriations Act, 2023, an omnibus spending bill, included a clause in the AOC budget "That none of the funds appropriated or made available under this heading in this Act or any other Act, including previous Acts, may be used for a home-to-work vehicle for the Architect or a duly authorized designee". On February 13, 2023, President Joe Biden rescinded Blanton's appointment as Architect of the Capitol.

== Awards ==
- Bronze Star with Combat "V"
