= Michael G. Turnbull =

Canadian-born American architect

Michael Gary Turnbull (born April 13, 1949) is a Canadian-born American architect who has spent much of his career in the public sector as a custodian of major public buildings, notably the U.S. Capitol in Washington, D.C., as the assistant to the Architect of the Capitol and as the Director of Design and Construction at the Art Institute of Chicago.

In recognition of his achievements in architecture and his dedication in maintaining these national treasures, the American Institute of Architects elected him to its College of Fellows in 2005.

== Early life ==
Michael Gary Turnbull was born in Stratford, Ontario, Canada. His father, Gordon McKinnon Turnbull, was a soldier and World War II veteran of The Royal Canadian Regiment, frequently stationed in Great Britain, including during the Battle of Britain.

Michael's mother, Catherine Agnes Turnbull (née Keable), was an Irish Catholic who had moved to Manchester, England following the Irish War of Independence. She became a war bride during World War II, moving to Canada with her Canadian husband following his discharge.

In 1960, on the same night of the U.S. presidential election, 1960 that saw the election of John F. Kennedy, Michael moved with his parents and brother, Barry Gordon Turnbull, to Chicago, Illinois, and would become a United States citizen seven years later.

== Life ==
Growing up in the Chicago suburb of Oak Park, Illinois, home to renowned architect Frank Lloyd Wright, young Michael developed an interest in Wright's profession. While in Oak Park, Turnbull attended Oak Park and River Forest High School, graduating as a member of the Class of 1967. He later received his Bachelor of Architecture degree from the University of Illinois at Chicago.

After several stints at private architectural firms, including Skidmore, Owings and Merrill, he entered the public sphere. In 1984, he became the Staff Architect for the Art Institute of Chicago, responsible for overseeing the expansion of the museum through the Rice Building addition and the museum's renovation of Buckingham Fountain for the Chicago Park District.

By the time he left the museum in 1998, he was the Director of Design and Construction, one of the most senior officers at the art museum. While a resident of the Chicago Metropolitan Area, Turnbull served as a member of the board of governors of the Illinois St. Andrew Society. In 1998, Turnbull became the 5th Assistant Architect of the Capitol, serving under Architect of the Capitol Alan Hantman, FAIA.

He is currently the representative of the Architect of the Capitol on the National Capital Memorial Advisory Commission and the Zoning Commission of the District of Columbia. Professionally, he is a member of the Society of college and University Planners, the American Planning Association, and of course the American Institute of Architects.

As Assistant Architect, Turnbull's most prominent projects included the renovation of the Dirksen Senate Office Building, repairs and modernization of the conservatory of the United States Botanic Garden, and the expansion and modernization of the United States Supreme Court building.

The Supreme Court project was the most comprehensive Turnbull was responsible for, working closely with Justices Sandra Day O'Connor, Anthony Kennedy, and David Souter. For his service to the Supreme Court of the United States, both Justices O'Connor and Kennedy recommended Turnbull for his Fellowship in the American Institute of Architects.
