= United States Capitol Guide Service =

Agency of the United States Congress

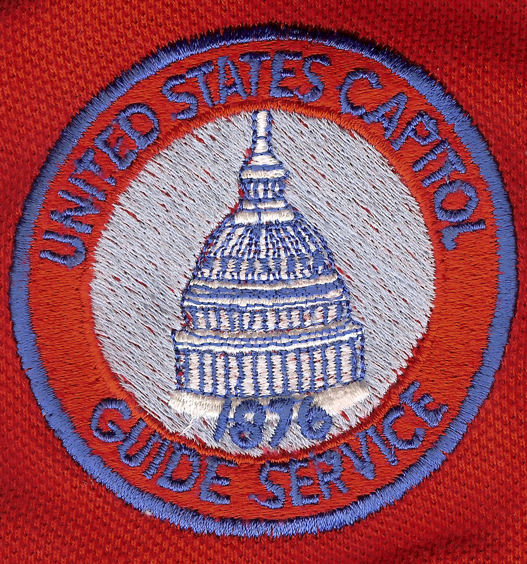
Patch of the United States Capitol Guides

The United States Capitol Guide Service is a guide service charged by the United States Congress to "provide guided tours of the interior of the United States Capitol Building for the education and enlightenment of the general public, without charge for such tours". It exists under 2 U.S.C. § 2166. The Service's operations are part of the United States Capitol Visitor Center operations.

== History ==
Created in 1876 as part of the United States Centennial celebrations, the Capitol Guide Service was subject to the direction, supervision, and control of a Capitol Guide Board consisting of the architect of the Capitol, the sergeant at arms of the Senate, and the sergeant at arms of the House of Representatives. These same three officials also made up the Capitol Police Board. The board was abolished in 2008. Key Guide Service personnel included the Director, four Assistant Directors, as well as many regular guides.

Personnel of the Capitol Guide Service could also be transferred to the United States Capitol Police force at the discretion of the Capitol Guide Board to provide ushering and informational services, and other services not directly involving law enforcement. This sometimes happened during major events, such as presidential inaugurations and Lying in State ceremonies.

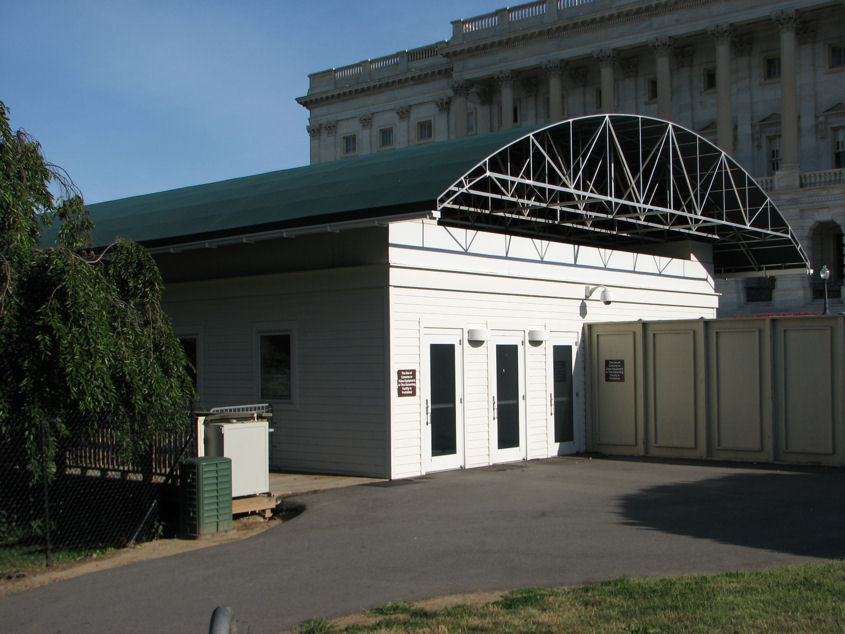
South Visitor Facility

The Capitol Guides operated out of facilities located on the south side of the United States Capitol. Visitors were processed through the South Visitor Facility which included security screening and then directed into the Capitol, itself, via a walk around the west front of the building to enter through a west terrace door. Behind the South Visitor Facility was a trailer, which served as the temporary rest area and locker facility for the guides. Upon the opening of the Capitol Visitor Center (CVC) on December 2, 2008, both buildings were removed and all guide-related operations as well as the guides themselves were transferred to the jurisdiction and oversight of the Architect of the Capitol, specifically the Visitor Services Division of the Capitol Visitor Center.

In 2018 (effective January 2019) the United States Capitol Guide Service was transferred to the Office of the Capitol Visitor Center.

== Uniform ==
The Capitol Guide Service had two uniforms, a full dress and a summer uniform. The full dress uniform was notable for its striking red blazer with a circular patch on the left breast. It was accompanied by a white shirt, navy blue tie, and navy blue pants. It could be accompanied by a navy blue vest. It was required for ceremonies and other formal occasions, as well as cold weather. The less formal summer uniform was a red cotton short sleeve polo shirt with a circular patch on the left breast. It was accompanied by navy blue pants. The summer uniform was generally not worn until temperatures were above 70 °F (21 °C).
