= Hart Senate Office Building =

Government building in Washington, D.C.

Philip A. Hart Senate Office Building
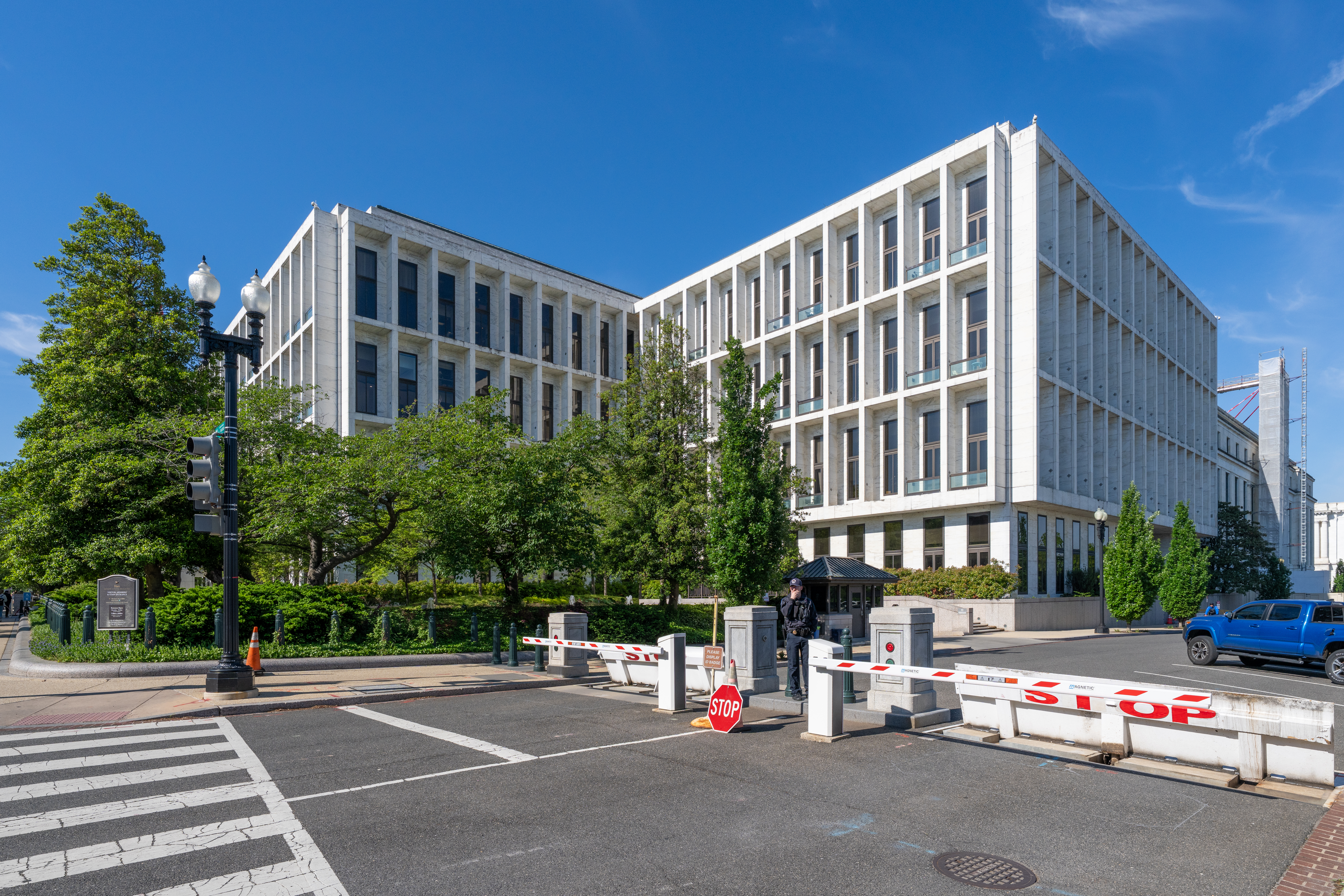
- Looking southwest at the Hart Senate Office Building (c. 2026)

- Location within Central Washington, D.C.

General information
- Status: Completed
- Type: Offices
- Location: United States Capitol Complex, Washington, D.C., United States
- Coordinates: 38°53′35″N 77°0′15″W
- Completed: November 1982; 43 years ago

Technical details
- Material: Steel, reinforced concrete, marble
- Floor area: 1,271,030 square feet (118,083 m^{2})

Design and construction
- Architecture firm: John Carl Warnecke & Associates

Website
- Hart Senate Office Building

The Philip A. Hart Senate Office Building is the third U.S. Senate office building, and is located on 2nd Street NE between Constitution Avenue NE and C Street NE, northeast of the United States Capitol in Washington, D.C., in the United States. Construction began in January 1975, and it was first occupied in November 1982. Rapidly rising construction costs plagued the building, creating several unfortunate scandals. The structure is named for Philip A. Hart (1912–1976), who served 18 years as a United States Senator from Michigan. Accessed via a spur of the United States Capitol subway system, the building features a nine-story atrium dominated by massive artwork, and a large Central Hearing Facility which provides television facilities as well as extensive seating.

== Design and construction ==
The Dirksen Senate Office Building was intended to occupy the entire block bounded by 1st Street NE, Constitution Avenue NE, 2nd Street NE, and C Street NE. However, due to the resource and financial demands of the Korean War, the building was scaled back and occupied only the western half of this area.

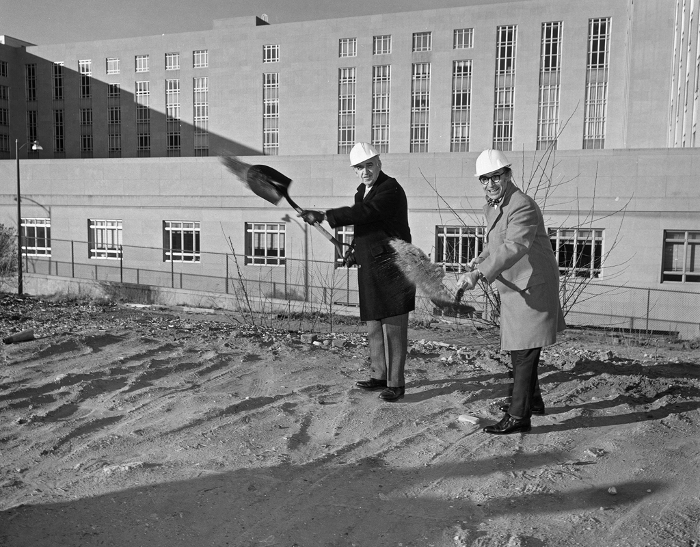
Groundbreaking for the Hart Senate Office Building on January 5, 1976. Assistant Architect of the Capitol Mario Campioli (left) and Architect of the Capitol George White (right).

In 1969, Congress voted to acquire the eastern half of the block for a "New Senate Office Building". Originally, the Senate intended only to build a $21 million ($166,947,412 in 2025 dollars) underground parking garage here. That effort was approved in June 1971. But in May 1972, the Subcommittee on Buildings of the Senate Committee on Public Works approved a plan to construct the New Senate Office Building above the parking garage. The building's cost was estimated at $48 million ($381,594,084 in 2025 dollars) in June 1972. The full Senate approved the building plan in September 1972, but by then the building's estimated cost had risen to $53.5 million ($411,784,010 in 2025 dollars).

In April 1973, the Architect of the Capitol awarded the architectural design contract to John Carl Warnecke, a nationally prominent architect working in the District of Columbia who had helped save Lafayette Square and designed the John F. Kennedy grave site. Warnecke's design for the building was approved by the Senate Committee on Public Works on August 8, 1974. Warnecke was given just two weeks to come up with the cost estimate, which the Architect of the Capitol later claimed was far too little time to generate an accurate cost forecast. By the end of the year, the estimated cost of construction had risen to $69 million.

Ground for the new structure was broken in January 1975, and by the time ground clearance began in April the building's cost had risen to $84 million ($502,597,403 in 2025 dollars). The poor and uneven condition of the soil at the site caused delays in the excavation, and major cost increases. When the foundations were finished, it was discovered that many of the anchoring bolts were misaligned and had to be replaced. This also added extensive new costs to the project. (Note: Victor J. Frenkil, owner of Baltimore Contractors, Inc., later sued the federal government for $13.5 million, claiming it owed him this money for fixing the problems caused by the George F. Hyman Construction Co. when it installed the anchor bolts incorrectly. In June 1985, the government awarded Frenkil $1.3 million.)

On August 30, 1976, the Senate voted to name the new office building the Philip A. Hart Senate Office Building in honor of retiring Senator Philip Hart (D-Michigan). Hart died on December 26, 1976, of melanoma, having declined to run for reelection the previous November.

By August 1978, actual construction costs were now $85 million ($419,579,082 in 2025 dollars) and were expected to top $122 million ($602,219,388 in 2025 dollars). The Senate approved a plan to spend another $54 million ($266,556,122 in 2025 dollars) on the structure, and cap costs at $135 million ($666,390,306 in 2025 dollars). Initially, the House approved this plan. But when constituents bitterly complained, the House reversed itself on both counts. By 1979, construction estimates had soared to $179 million ($794,050,894 in 2025 dollars), and the General Accounting Office said it would rise to $230 million ($1,020,288,858 in 2025 dollars) without changes. In July 1979, the Senate agreed to cap costs at $137.7 million ($610,842,503 in 2025 dollars) after an acrimonious three-hour debate during which some senators suggested the building be torn down. The Architect of the Capitol ordered changes in the design to keep construction costs under the $137.7 million cap. These included elimination of a penthouse-level dining room, (Note: The dining room had already been constructed, but not the kitchen, and no equipment had been ordered. In June 1985, the Architect of the Capital announced that funds left over from the building's construction would be used to finish the dining room, and turn it into a special events room. This did not include a kitchen, however.) $906,000 ($3,022,603 in 2025 dollars) in furnishings for an interior gymnasium, (Note: The 60-by-120-foot (18 by 37 m) square space was built, but now it was not intended to be furnished.) oak paneling for each senator's office, dimmer switches for lights, a $400,000 ($1,334,483 in 2025 dollars) art gallery, $227,000 ($757,319 in 2025 dollars) in carpeting for auxiliary space, $167,700 ($559,482 in 2025 dollars) for vertical blinds, and $1.2 million ($4,003,448 in 2025 dollars) for finishes and furnishings for a large central hearing room with hidden multimedia bays.

The Hart Senate Office Building was completed in September 1982 at a cost of $137.7 million ($459,395,690 in 2025 dollars). The Architect of the Capitol argued that the significantly higher costs of the Hart Senate Office building were due to the unexpected excavation issues, the foundation construction errors, Senate-ordered changes, high inflation, and some mismanagement of the construction project. Architect of the Capitol George Malcolm White argued the construction cost was a reasonable $110 per square foot. Architect John Carl Warnecke defended the building's cost, noting that it almost doubled in size (from 650,000 square feet (60,000 m^{2}) to 1,100,000 square feet (100,000 m^{2})), and that building costs in the District of Columbia leapt 76 percent during its erection. Warnecke dismissed allegations about Senate-ordered changes, saying these increased costs just 2 percent, and said that construction alone was just $107 million ($356,974,138 in 2025 dollars) (with another $28 million ($93,413,793 in 2025 dollars) coming from administrative costs, fees, and furnishings). He argued that excellent construction management held inflation in construction costs to just 67 percent, and that the building was erected at a cost of $97 per square foot, "well below the costs of any other major public building built in the District during that period." However, the American Institute of Architects said commercial construction costs in Washington, D.C., ranged from $54 to $65 per square foot, and The Christian Science Monitor reported the cost of the building at $137.70 per square foot.

The building was first occupied on November 22, 1982. The structure contained offices for 50 senators, but 25 of them refused to move into the structure. To save costs, the building gave each person a cubicle, rather than an office, which greatly upset Senate staff. To resolve the issue, junior senators (not normally able to choose which offices they wanted, nor obtain spacious and well-equipped ones) were able to claim the large, modern offices in the Hart Senate Office Building.

In late 1982, the Senate found $9.5 million ($31,693,966 in 2025 dollars) in unused funds, which it designated to pay for the modular furniture and partitions for use in the Hart building.

== Structure ==
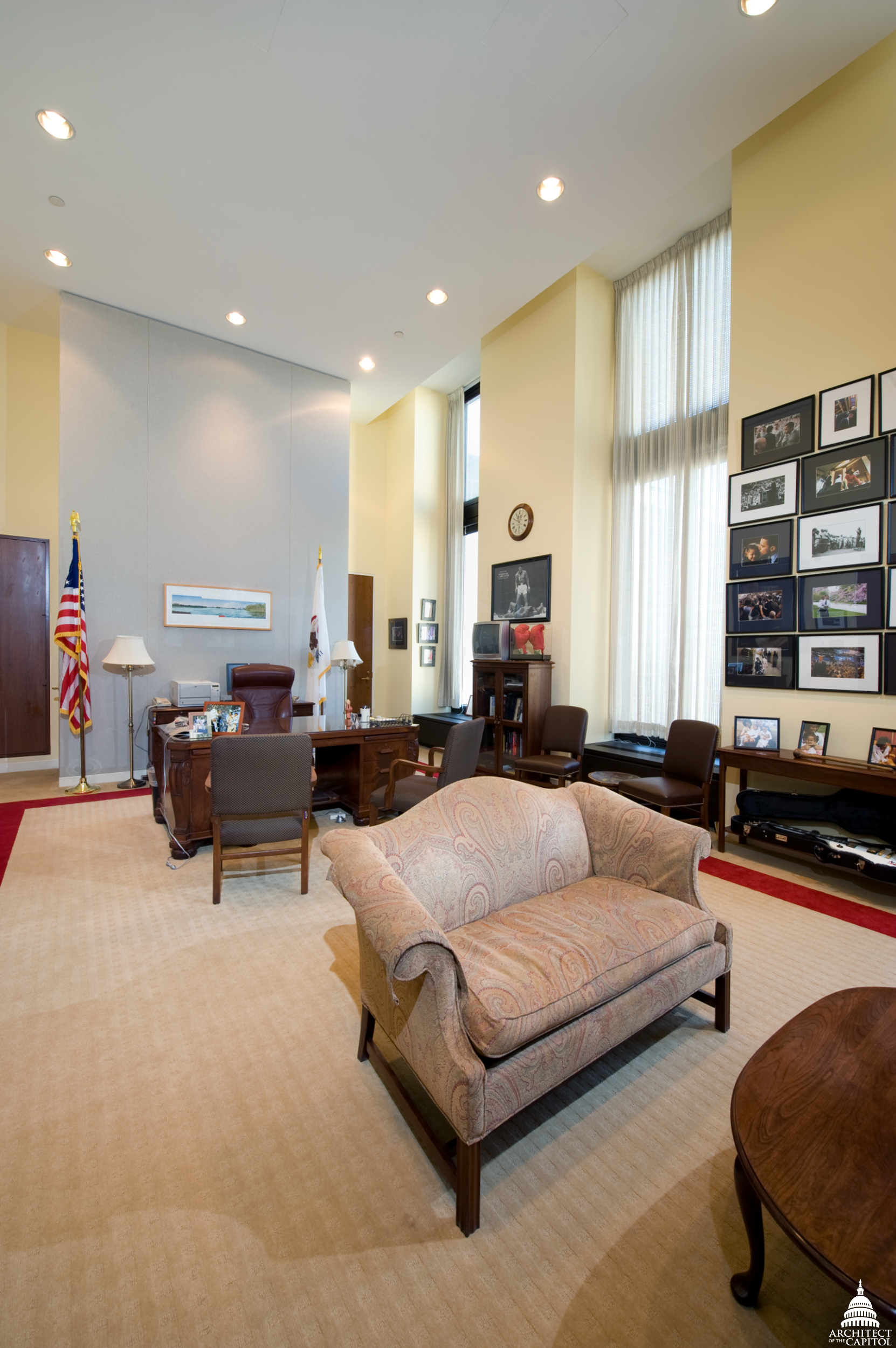
Typical 16-foot (4.9 m) high Senator's office in the Hart building.

The Hart Senate Office Building consists of nine above-ground stories. The structure has 1,000,000 square feet (93,000 m^{2}) of internal floor space, of which 333,000 square feet (30,900 m^{2}) is usable.

Instead of the Neoclassical architectural style of the Dirksen and Russell Senate Office Buildings, the Hart Senate Office Building is Modernist. To fit within the context provided by the Dirksen and Russell buildings, Hart's building lines were designed to mesh with those of the earlier structures and the new building clad in dazzlingly white marble from Vermont. The marble was 3 inches (7.6 cm) thick, twice the usual thickness for an office building, and used to cover even the most mundane aspects of the structure (such as the mechanical shed on the roof). More than 8,961 short tons (8,129 t) of marble were needed for interior and exterior use.

To echo the courtyards of Dirksen and Russell, the Hart building has an atrium covered by a vast skylight. The walls of the interior of the structure, including the atrium, are clad in the same white Vermont marble as the exterior. The atrium's floor, however, is rose-colored Tennessee marble. Walkways on the interior of the atrium provide access to each office suite.

The public entrance to each suite is on an odd-numbered floor, with private staff entrances on even-numbered floors. Each office suite contains a private office for a senator which has outward-facing windows and has 16-foot (4.9 m) high ceilings. Due to the building's layout, a workspace with identical ceilings and views is adjacent to each senator's office. Workspace elsewhere in the suite exists on a main floor and a mezzanine, connected by an internal stairs. This office space has unusually low 8-foot (2.4 m) high ceilings. All workspace is generally free of columns and walls. A partition system consisting of oak frames covered in sound-absorbent fabric, designed and manufactured by Acoustical Screen Corporation, was designed for use in providing a flexible partition system in each office. These partitions were originally purchased for only a handful of offices, due to cutbacks in the building's furnishing budget. (Note: The cost of the partitions and cubicles for use in the structure was an estimated $9.5 million, but the Senate Rules and Administration Committee voted to turn down the request. Instead, senators were instructed to reutilize furniture brought from their old offices.) Each office also has a private restroom.

Manhole covers in the sidewalks and streets nearby were made of bronze, to avoid unsightly rust stains from traditional iron manhole covers (the usual material). The interior elevator doors were also cast in bronze, and areas in the floors in suites, meeting rooms, and some public areas had removable panels and built-in tubing which allowed for the easy replacement or upgrading of electrical, telecommunications, and computer wiring. The cafeteria beneath the Dirksen Senate Office Building was doubled in size and extended beneath the Hart building, which allowed the public to use for the first time during lunch hours.

The structure's $137 million cost did not include furnishing, which Senate experts estimated would cost another $32.6 million ($108,760,345 in 2025 dollars). Unspecified changes made by Warnecke led to $4.2 million ($14,012,069 in 2025 dollars) in cost savings, however. These allowed certain items to be restored, such as the large hearing room, auxiliary area carpeting, vertical blinds, and the gymnasium equipment (now estimated to cost just $736,000 ($2,455,448 in 2025 dollars)). The cost savings also allowed the Architect of the Capitol to build a tennis court on the building's roof.

Below the structure is a 350-car parking garage.

The building's design deliberately spared the adjacent Sewall–Belmont house, a historic structure that serves as headquarters for the National Woman's Party and a museum about the women's suffrage movement.

=== Central Hearing Facility ===
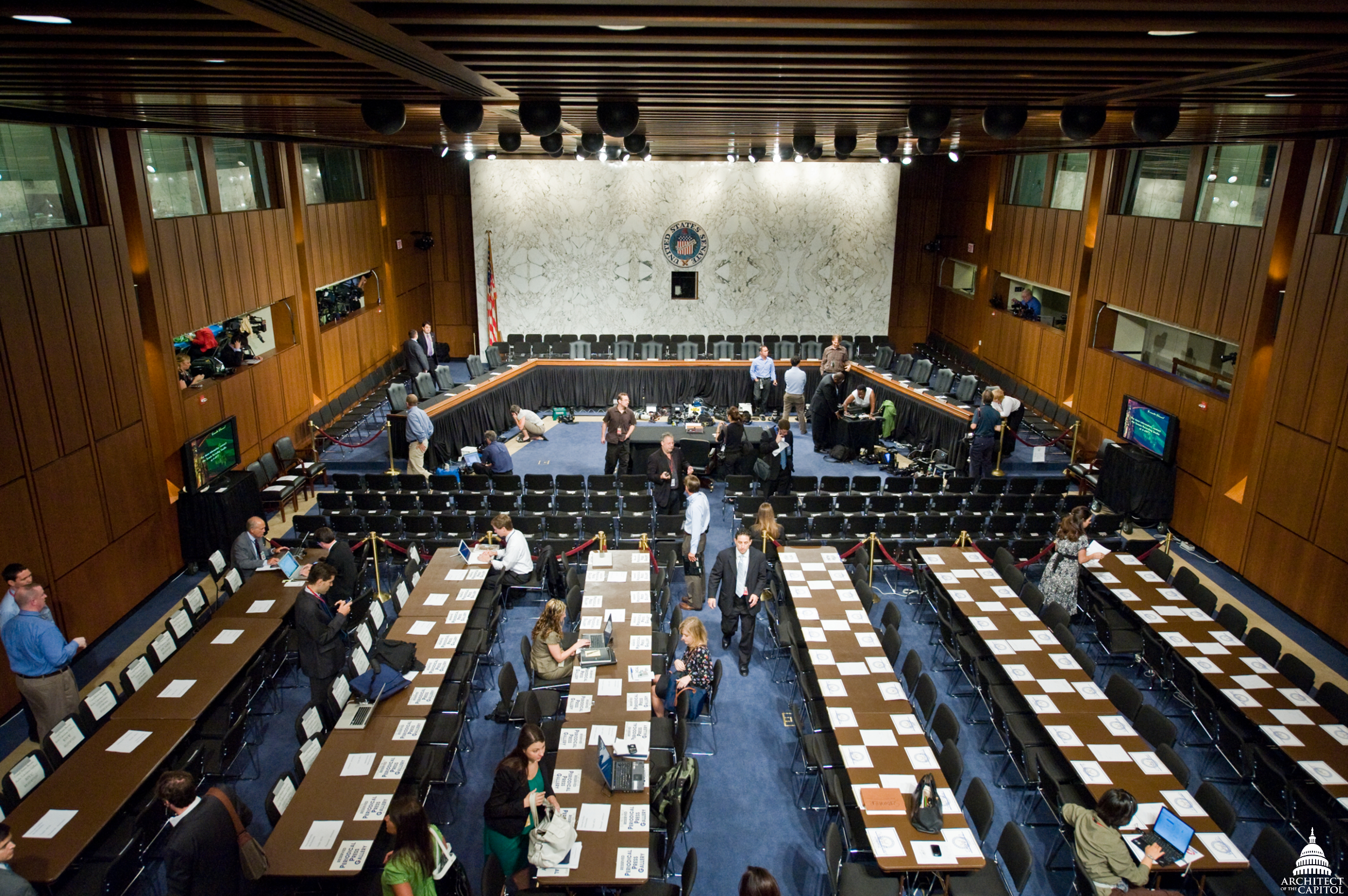
Central Hearing Facility in the Hart building.

The Central Hearing Facility was completed in October 1987, and used for the first time in January 1988. Located on the second floor of the Hart Senate Office Building, the two-story high room has studio-quality television lighting built into the ceiling. Booths built into the sides of the room are elevated and can accommodate television camera crews. Above them are glassed-in booths where television reporters and news presenters can report from without disturbing the proceedings below.

The Central Hearing Facility is lavishly paneled and has a stone backdrop behind the dais.

Public access to the Central Hearing Facility is controlled via two foyers, accessible from the public hallways. Privately, members of Congress, their staff, and often witnesses access the hearing room from nondescript doors on the second floor of the Dirksen Senate Office Building. A small "green room", hidden behind the back wall of the Central Hearing Facility, provides a waiting room and space for individuals to prepare before entering the main hearing room.

=== Subway access ===
A spur of the United States Capitol Subway System was constructed to connect the Hart Senate Office Building to the subway's main track beneath the Dirksen Senate Office Building. The spur opened when the new building did. In 1989, the Senate approved a plan to upgrade the subway beneath the Hart and Dirksen office buildings. The changes included four new cars capable of seating 25 people (up from 18), making platforms and cars wheelchair-accessible, and automating these cars (eliminating the need for car conductors). The changes were expected to produce savings of $122,000 ($316,872 in 2025 dollars) a year and cut waiting times to two minutes from four. Transportation Group Inc., of Orlando, Florida, was paid $15.8 million ($41,037,584 in 2025 dollars) and the Architect of the Capitol received $2 million ($5,194,631 in 2025 dollars) to design and manufacture the new subway cars and system. The system was finished in 1994.

=== Atrium ===
The atrium in the Hart Senate Office Building is 90 feet (27 m) high and capped by a lighting system and skylight. The skylight is actually 18 separate skylights, each of which has nine panels. A four-globe light fixture is suspended from each skylight. Each light fixture has an electric motor which can lower the fixture to the lobby floor so that bulbs can be replaced.

Beginning in 2014, major renovations and repairs were made to the roof of the Hart building. The roof had reached the end of its life and was replaced. The skylights, which leaked extensively and were causing damage to the building, were also replaced. To enhance the building's energy efficiency, solar panels capable of generating 148 kilowatts of solar power were installed on the roof. The entire roof project cost about $11.3 million ($15,367,936 in 2025 dollars).

=== Mountains and Clouds ===
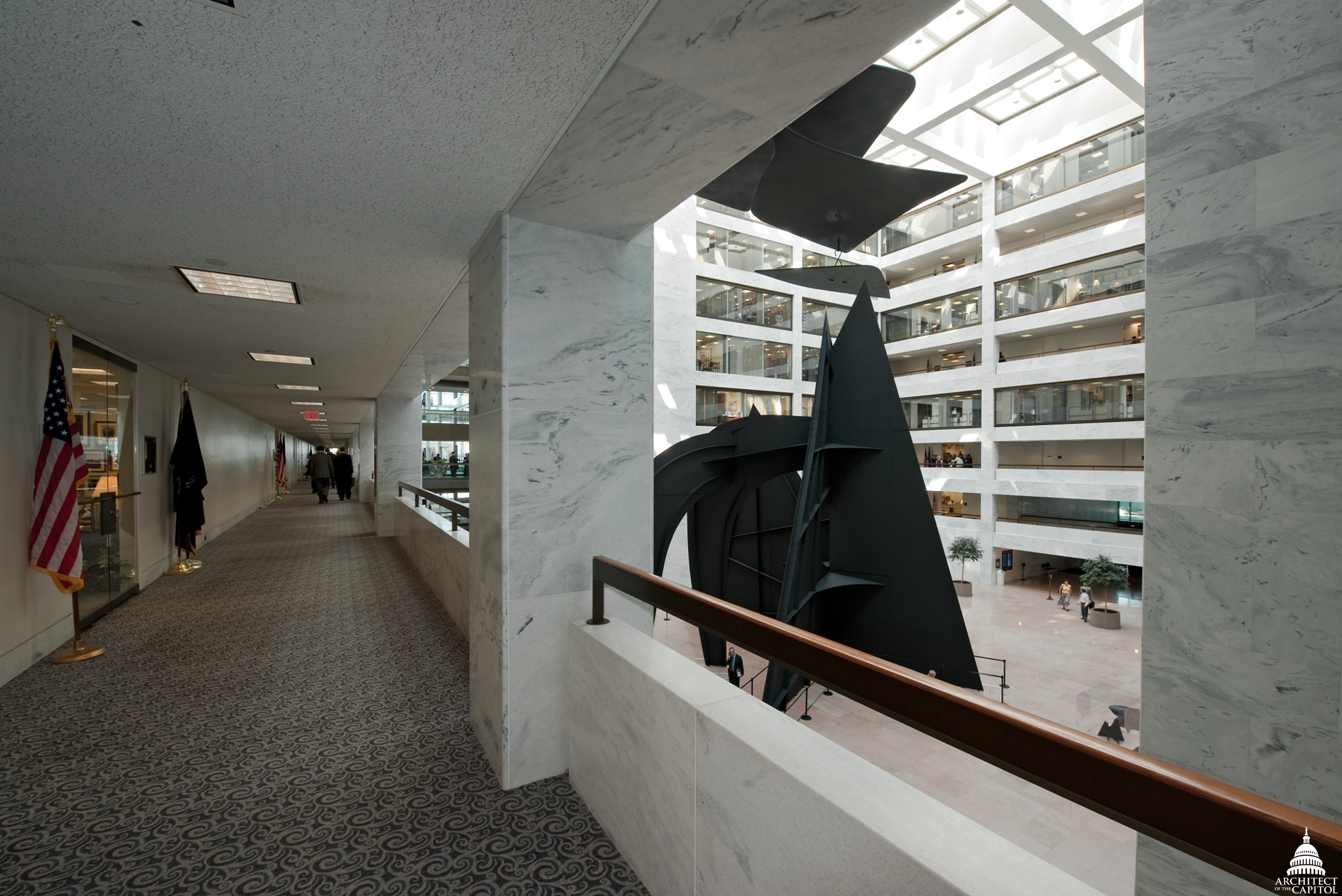
Walkway arcades on each floor provide access to the offices of the Hart building, as well as a view of the atrium. A portion of Mountains and Clouds can be seen in this image.

The atrium is dominated by the sculptural work Mountains and Clouds by Alexander Calder. The upper part of the work consists of a mobile, Clouds", made from curved aluminum plates suspended from the roof on a shaft. The largest section of the mobile measures roughly 43 by 32 feet (13.1 by 9.8 m), and the entire mobile weighs about 4,300 pounds (2,000 kg). Crystallization Systems, Inc. of New York manufactured the mobile. A computer-controlled motor moves the mobile.

The lower part of the work consists of a stabile made of four flat, triangular-shaped steel plates painted matte black and supported by two curving legs. Sources differ as to how tall the stabile is, with reported heights of 51 feet (16 m), 52 feet (16 m), and 55 feet (17 m). The stabile weighs about 38 short tons (34 t) or 39 short tons (35 t). The Segré Foundry of Waterbury, Connecticut, manufactured the stabile.

Mountains and Clouds was the last work Calder completed. He was in Washington, D.C., on November 10, 1976, to show the finalized maquette to Architect of the Capitol George White. White gave his approval for the full-size work to be installed at the Hart Senate Office Building. Calder flew to his daughter's home in New York, and died of a heart attack at 6:00 AM on November 11.

During the budget battles in 1979 over the cost of the Hart Senate Office Building, funds for completion of the Calder work were deleted. But Senator Nicholas F. Brady, who had been appointed to serve out the unexpired term of Senator Harrison A. Williams (who had resigned on March 11, 1982, after his bribery conviction in the Abscam scandal), decided in June 1982 to establish the Capitol Art Foundation. The foundation's goal was to raise funds for the placement of art through the United States Capitol Complex. By June 1985, the foundation had raised $250,000 ($748,376 in 2025 dollars) to manufacture and $400,000 ($1,197,401 in 2025 dollars) to install Mountains and Clouds. Most of the money came from billionaire art collector Paul Mellon and C. Douglas Dillon. The work was dedicated in a ceremony held on May 5, 1987.

Some time after the installation of the work, the motor malfunctioned and the mobile portion of Mountains and Clouds stopped rotating. When this happened is unclear, with one source saying shortly after the work's installation and another saying about 2005. In 2015, Senator Chris Murphy began a fundraising effort to restore the mobile to operation.

Mountains and Clouds is considered a one-of-a-kind work, as it is the only work by Calder to combine a mobile and a stabile. "He had mounted the forms atop one another before, but had never used them separately in a single piece as he anticipated to do with moving clouds and stationary mountains," says Capitol Hill reporter Justin Cox.

After the 2011 Virginia earthquake, there were concerns that the mobile might have become unsafe. It was lowered to the ground in 2014, and a complete safety check of the work conducted. It was restored to its suspended position in 2015.

== Events ==
=== Anthrax attack ===
On October 15, 2001, several suites of the building became contaminated by the release of anthrax powder from an envelope mailed to Senate Majority Leader Tom Daschle in the 2001 anthrax attacks. The building was closed October 17, 2001, displacing hundreds of Senate staff. The building was decontaminated using chlorine dioxide gas from November to December 2001, and the building reopened January 23, 2002.

=== 2025 birthday party ===
On October 15, 2025, Jim Justice hosted a birthday party for his dog Babydog in the Hart Senate Office Building in spite of a federal government shutdown at the time. The party was attended by fans, journalists, and politicians such as Tommy Tuberville and Chuck Grassley. Cakes and snacks shaped like Babydog were served.

== Committee offices ==
Three Senate committees have offices located inside Hart Senate Office Building:

- United States Senate Committee on Indian Affairs
- United States Senate Select Committee on Ethics
- United States Senate Select Committee on Intelligence

== Senators with Hart offices ==
Name	Party	State	Room
Alan Armstrong	R	Oklahoma	Room SH330
Tammy Baldwin	D	Wisconsin	Room 141
Jim Banks	R	Indiana	Room 303
Richard Blumenthal	D	Connecticut	Room 503
Lisa Blunt Rochester	D	Delaware	Room 513
Cory Booker	D	New Jersey	Room 306
Maria Cantwell	D	Washington	Room 511
John Cornyn	R	Texas	Room 517
Catherine Cortez Masto	D	Nevada	Room 309
Kevin Cramer	R	North Dakota	Room 313
John Curtis	R	Utah	Room 502
Steve Daines	R	Montana	Room 320
Tammy Duckworth	D	Illinois	Room 524
Dick Durbin	D	Illinois	Room 711
Ruben Gallego	D	Arizona	Room 302
Chuck Grassley	R	Iowa	Room 135
Maggie Hassan	D	New Hampshire	Room 324
Martin Heinrich	D	New Mexico	Room 709
John Hickenlooper	D	Colorado	Room 316
Mazie Hirono	D	Hawaii	Room 109
Cindy Hyde-Smith	R	Mississippi	Room 528
Ron Johnson	R	Wisconsin	Room 328
Jim Justice	R	West Virginia	Room 509
Mark Kelly	D	Arizona	Room 516
Andy Kim	D	New Jersey	Room 520
Angus King	I	Maine	Room 133
James Lankford	R	Oklahoma	Room 731
David McCormick	R	Pennsylvania	Room 702
Jeff Merkley	D	Oregon	Room 531
Lisa Murkowski	R	Alaska	Room 522
Chris Murphy	D	Connecticut	Room 136
Jon Ossoff	D	Georgia	Room 317
Alex Padilla	D	California	Room 331
Gary Peters	D	Michigan	Room 724
Jack Reed	D	Rhode Island	Room 728
Jacky Rosen	D	Nevada	Room 713
Mike Rounds	R	South Dakota	Room 716
Brian Schatz	D	Hawaii	Room 722
Adam Schiff	D	California	Room 112
Chuck Schumer	D	New York	Room 322
Rick Scott	R	Florida	Room 110
Tim Scott	R	South Carolina	Room 104
Jeanne Shaheen	D	New Hampshire	Room 506
Tina Smith	D	Minnesota	Room 720
Dan Sullivan	R	Alaska	Room 706
Chris Van Hollen	D	Maryland	Room 730
Mark Warner	D	Virginia	Room 703
Raphael Warnock	D	Georgia	Room 717
Elizabeth Warren	D	Massachusetts	Room 311
Sheldon Whitehouse	D	Rhode Island	Room 530
