= Architect of the Capitol =

U.S. federal agency that maintains the United States Capitol Complex

Agency overview
- Formed: 1793; 233 years ago
- Jurisdiction: United States Capitol Complex
- Headquarters: United States Capitol; Washington, D.C. 20515
- Employees: 2,667
- Annual budget: $855 million (2025)
- Agency executives: Thomas E. Austin, Architect; Joseph A. Campbell, Deputy Architect; Luiz A. Santos, Inspector General
- Website: aoc.gov

The Architect of the Capitol (AOC) is a federal agency within the legislative branch of the United States government that is responsible for the maintenance, operation, development, construction, building preservation, and property management of the United States Capitol Complex and is accountable directly to the United States Congress and the Supreme Court of the United States.

Both the agency and the head of the agency are called "Architect of the Capitol". The head of the agency is appointed by a vote of a congressional commission for a ten-year term. Prior to 2024, the president of the United States appointed the architect upon confirmation vote by the United States Senate, and was accountable to the president.

== Overview ==
The agency had 2,667 employees and an annual budget of approximately $855 million as of September 2025.

The head of the agency sits on the Capitol Police Board, which has jurisdiction over the United States Capitol Police, and on the United States Capitol Guide Board, which has jurisdiction over the United States Capitol Guide Service. The head of the agency is a member of the Capitol Police Board and the Congressional Accessibility Services Board, as well as an ex officio member of the United States Capitol Preservation Commission. Additionally, the architect of the Capitol is a member of the District of Columbia Zoning Commission, the President's Advisory Council on Historic Preservation, the National Capital Memorial Commission, the Art Advisory Committee to the Washington Metropolitan Area Transit Authority and the National Institute for Conservation of Cultural Property.

Until 1989, the architect of the Capitol was appointed by the president of the United States for an indefinite term. The Legislative Branch Appropriations Act, 1990 provided that the president appoints the architect for a term of ten years, with the advice and consent of the Senate, from a list of three candidates recommended by a congressional commission composed of the speaker of the House, president pro tem of the Senate, the majority and minority leaders of the House and Senate, and the chair and ranking members of the House Committee on House Administration, the Senate Committee on Rules and Administration, and the House and Senate Committees on Appropriations. Beginning in 2024, the architect is appointed by a commission of the Senate and House and is eligible for reappointment after completion of a 10-year term.

== Responsibility ==
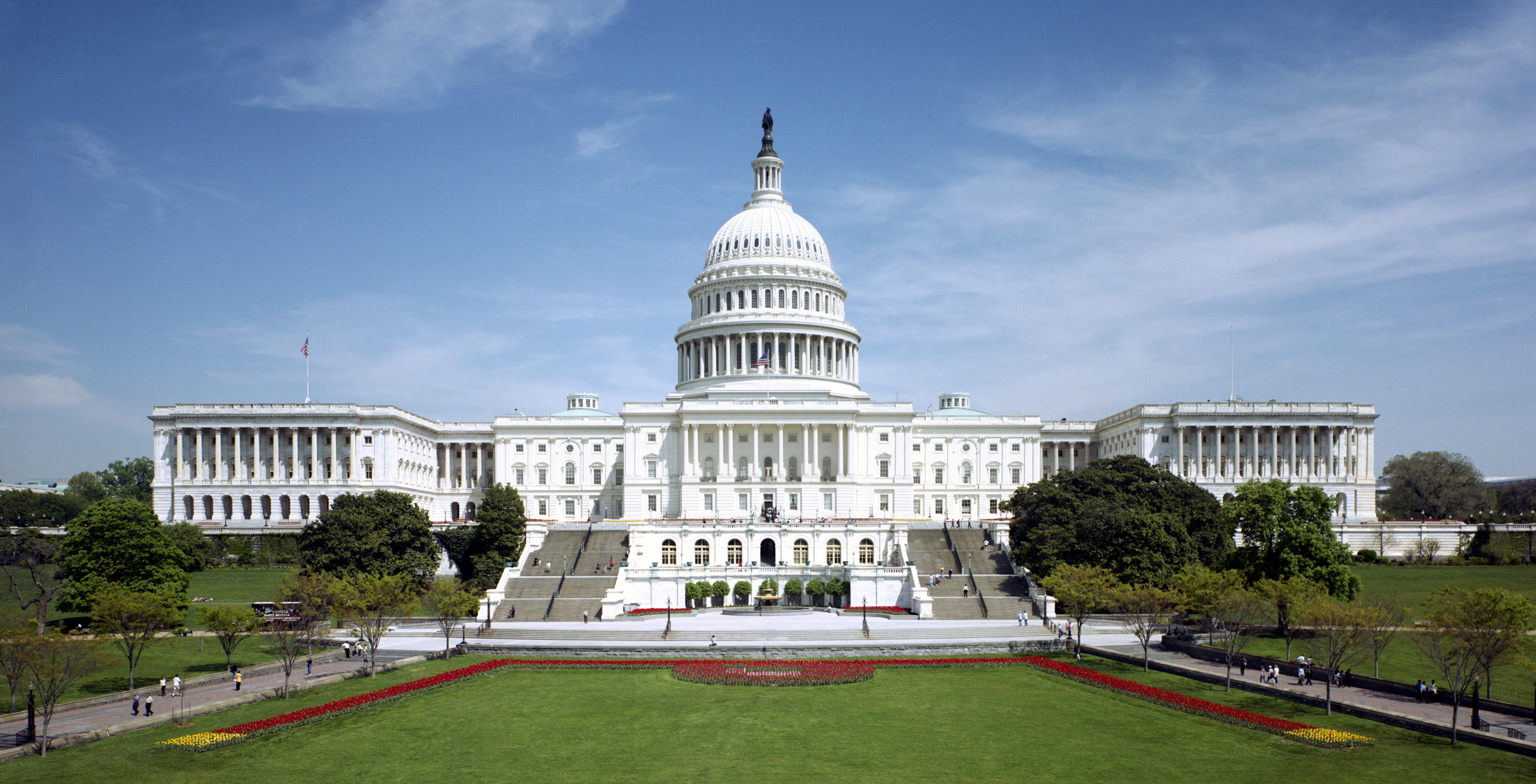
Western front of the U.S. Capitol

The Architect of the Capitol is responsible to Congress and the Supreme Court for the maintenance, operation, development, and preservation of 18.4 million square feet (1,710,000 m^{2}) of buildings and more than 570 acres (230 ha) of land throughout Capitol Hill including: the House and Senate Office Buildings, Capitol Visitor Center, Library of Congress Buildings, U.S. Supreme Court Building, Thurgood Marshall Federal Judiciary Building, and other facilities. The agency head is responsible for the care of all works of art in the U.S. Capitol as well as the maintenance and restoration of murals, outdoor sculpture and other architectural elements throughout the Capitol campus. The agency head also serves as Acting Director of the U.S. Botanic Garden.

The office is also responsible for the upkeep and improvement of the Capitol grounds, and the arrangement of inaugural ceremonies and other ceremonies held in the building or on the grounds. Legislation over the years has placed additional buildings and grounds under the Architect of the Capitol.

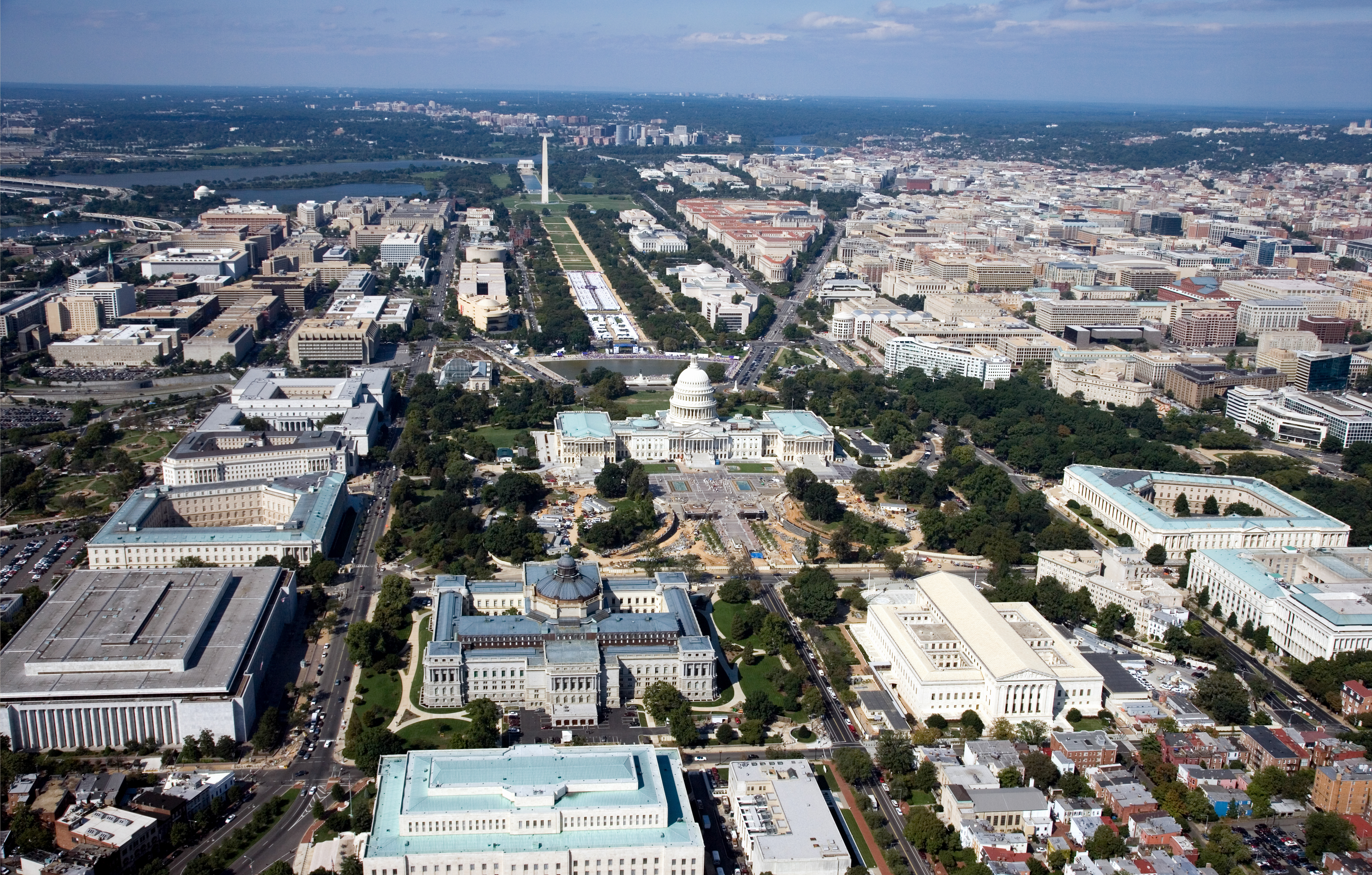
Capitol Complex (in foreground) looking toward the National Mall (2007)

The Capitol Complex includes:

- the Capitol
- Capitol Visitor Center
- the eight congressional office buildings
  - Cannon
  - Ford
  - Longworth
  - O'Neill
  - Rayburn
  - Russell
  - Dirksen
  - Hart
- Library of Congress buildings
- United States Supreme Court Building
- United States Botanic Garden
- Thurgood Marshall Federal Judiciary Building
- Capitol Power Plant
- Daniel Webster Senate Page Residence
- United States Capitol Police headquarters and K9 division facilities
- other facilities

== Architects of the Capitol ==
No.	Image	Architect of the Capitol	Term of office	Deputy Architect	Assistant Architect	Appointed by	Notes
1		William Thornton	1793–1802	—	—	Washington	Honored as the "first architect" for his design of the U.S. Capitol.
2		Benjamin Henry Latrobe	March 6, 1803 – July 1, 1811	—	—	Jefferson	Latrobe was appointed twice. President Jefferson appointed him to take over work on the building in 1803, and construction halted in 1811. During the War of 1812, British troops burned the Capitol, prompting President Madison to reappoint Latrobe as Architect of the Capitol to conduct repairs.
2		Benjamin Henry Latrobe	April 6, 1815 – November 20, 1817	—	—	Madison	Latrobe was appointed twice. President Jefferson appointed him to take over work on the building in 1803, and construction halted in 1811. During the War of 1812, British troops burned the Capitol, prompting President Madison to reappoint Latrobe as Architect of the Capitol to conduct repairs.
3		Charles Bulfinch	January 8, 1818 – June 25, 1829	—	—	Monroe	
4		Thomas U. Walter (Engineer-in-charge: Montgomery C. Meigs)	June 11, 1851 – May 26, 1865	—	Edward Clark	Fillmore	Walter and Meigs shared responsibility for the Capitol and the construction of its additions.
5		Edward Clark	August 30, 1865 – January 6, 1902	—	Elliott Woods (1901–1902)	A. Johnson	
6		Elliott Woods	February 19, 1902 – May 22, 1923	—	—	T. Roosevelt	Elliot Woods was not an architect, so the title during this time (from February 14 1902 to March 3 1921) was known as Superintendent of the Capitol Building and Grounds.
7		David Lynn	August 22, 1923 – September 30, 1954	—	Horace Rouzer (1930–1946); Arthur Cook (1946–1959)	Coolidge	
8		J. George Stewart	October 1, 1954 – May 24, 1970	—	Arthur Cook (1946–1959); Mario Campioli (1959–1980)	Eisenhower	
9		George Malcolm White	January 27, 1971 – November 21, 1995	—	Mario Campioli (1959–1980); William L. Ensign (1980–1997)	Nixon	Ensign acted as Architect after White's retirement until a replacement was appointed
10		Alan Hantman	January 6, 1997 – February 2, 2007	Richard A. McSeveney (Deputy: August 2003 - October 2005) Stephen T. Ayers (Deputy: October 2005 – February 2007) (Acting architect: February 2, 2007 – May 11, 2010)	Michael G. Turnbull (June 1998 – August 2021)	Clinton	The first architect of the Capitol appointed under the legislation passed in 1989 providing for a fixed, renewable ten-year term for the architects of the Capitol. On August 1, 2006, Hantman announced he would not seek a second term when his term expired in 2007.
11		Stephen T. Ayers	May 12, 2010 – November 23, 2018	Christine A. Merdon (Deputy: 2011 – November 23, 2018) (Acting architect: November 24, 2018 – 2020)	Michael G. Turnbull (June 1998 – August 2021)	Obama	Ayers was appointed acting architect of the Capitol from February 2007 – May 2010, and unanimously confirmed as Architect of the Capitol May 12, 2010.
12		Brett Blanton	January 16, 2020 – February 13, 2023	—	Michael G. Turnbull (June 1998 – August 2021)	Trump	Terminated by President Joe Biden following an inspector general's report found that he engaged in "administrative, ethical and policy violations"
13		Thomas E. Austin	June 24, 2024 – present	Joseph A. Campbell (October 2024 - October 2026)	Telora Dean (October 2026-Present)	Congressional Commission	First architect appointed by congressional commission after changes passed in the 2024 NDAA.

== See also ==
- Office of the Supervising Architect for the U.S. Treasury
- Architecture of Washington, D.C.
