= 54th Engineer Battalion =

Combat engineer battalion of the United States Army

54th Engineer Battalion, 173rd Airborne Brigade Combat Team
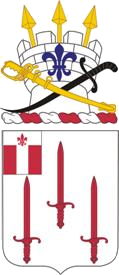
- 54th Engineer Battalion coat of arms
- Active: 54 EN BN: 1948-94,1997-2014; BSTB: 8 Jun 2006-17 Jun 15; 54 BEB: 17 Jun 2015-June 13 2025
- Disbanded: Restructured into the 173rd Combat Engineering Company
- Country: United States of America
- Allegiance: United States Army
- Branch: Active duty
- Type: Combat engineer battalion
- Size: Battalion
- Part of: 173rd Airborne Brigade Combat Team
- Garrison/HQ: Caserma Del Din (Vicenza, Italy)
- Nickname: Dagger Battalion
- Mottos: Essayons et Faisons (Fr: Let us try and let us do); Daggers In (Unofficial)
- Mascot: Dagger
- Engagements: World War 1 World War 2 Operation Desert Storm; Kosovo War; Afghanistan Campaign; Iraq Campaign

Commanders
- Commanding officer: LTC Travis N. Toole
- Command Sergeant Major: CSM Frank E. Batts

Insignia
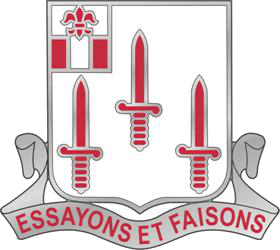
- Distinctive unit insignia (DUI)

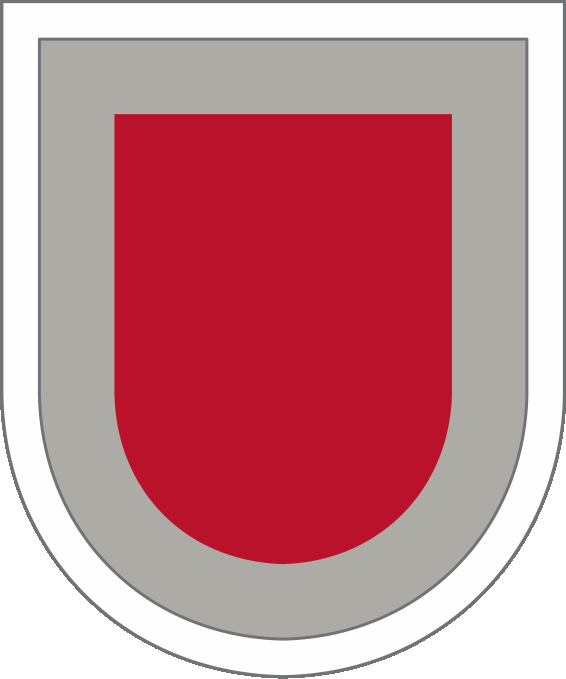
- Battalion beret flash

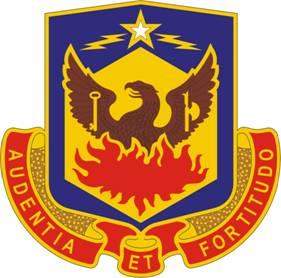
- Former DUI of the 173rd Special Troops Battalion

The 54th Brigade Engineer Battalion was a combat engineer battalion of the United States Army headquartered at Caserma Del Din in Vicenza, Italy. On June 13, 2025, the battalion was restructured into the 173rd Combat Engineering Company.

In its final form, it was the direct continuation of the former Special Troops Battalion, of the 173d Airborne Brigade Combat Team, but it carries the name and continues the lineage of the 54th Engineer Battalion, a previously mechanized Engineer Battalion.

The 54th Engineer Battalion was founded as the 42nd Engineer Battalion, constituted 7 December 1917. It was reorganized into the 20th Engineer Regiment and demobilized in 1918. Upon reactivation in October 1933, it has been somewhat continuously active until today, despite sporadic reorganization and short periods of inactivity.

The Special Troops Battalion was the organization for the command elements of the 173d Airborne Brigade Combat Team but is now the engineer element of the brigade. The battalion contained the brigade's senior command structure, including its Headquarters and Headquarters Company, as well as combat engineer, military intelligence, and signal elements. Activated in 2000 from inactivating support units, the Special Troops Battalion deployed with the 173rd Airborne Brigade Combat Team to Afghanistan in 2007 until 2008 and again in early 2010.

== Organization ==
The Special Troops Battalion was subordinate to the 173rd Airborne Brigade Combat Team and was a permanent formation of the brigade, as the 173rd's command elements are all contained in the STB. The battalion formerly consisted of three companies and the brigade's Headquarters and Headquarters Company. Company A was a Combat Engineer company, Company B was a Military Intelligence company, and Company C was a Signal company. These companies provided support for the other battalions of the 173rd Airborne Brigade Combat Team, and, as such, all of its companies were (and are) Airborne qualified. Currently, the 54th Engineer Battalion is organized into six companies. A "Castle" and B "Bastion" Companies are two Engineer Sapper units. C "Raven" Company is the Signals unit. D "Danger" Company is the Military Intelligence company. The final two companies are E "Spartan" Company and HHC "Havoc", the Forward Support and Headquarters and Headquarters Company, respectively.

== History ==
The 54th Brigade Engineer Battalion was an active duty airborne Engineer Battalion assigned to the 173rd Infantry Brigade Combat Team (Airborne) that carries the lineage of two separate battalions: the 54th Engineer Battalion (Combat), and the 173rd Special Troops Battalion.

=== 54th Engineer Battalion ===
The 54th Engineer Battalion was constituted in December 1917 as the 42nd Engineer Battalion. Reorganized as the 20th Engineer Regiment in 1918, it deployed to France during World War 1 as part of the American Expeditionary Forces, performing tasks from mine emplacement to bridge installation. After deactivation in 1919, and reactivation in 1940, the 20th Engineers deployed as part of WWII's Western Task Force, responsible for assault landings on beachheads from Africa to France, clearing docks and minefields and running rations houses. In 1944, the 2nd Battalion, 20th Engineers became the 1340th Engineer Combat Battalion. During the D-Day invasion of Normandy, the 1340th Engineers constructed Bailey bridges, breached obstacles under fire, and experienced high casualties being committed as infantry.

As U.S. Forces marched across Germany, the 1340th Engineers paved the way, building bridges, installing obstacles, and repairing roads. Following Germany's surrender in May 1945, the unit inactivated, and reactivated in Germany as the 54th Engineer Battalion (Combat). During the Berlin Crisis in 1961, the unit deployed to Germany once again, supporting the 11th and 14th Armored Cavalry Regiments (ACRs) in the Fulda Gap, defending the west from potential Soviet advance.

In 1986, the unit became the first Mechanized Combat Engineer Battalion, and in 1991, the 54th supported the 1st Armored Division during Operation Desert Storm. As the ground war commenced, the 54th provided mobility support, reducing bunkers and marking the route into Iraq. As the war raged on, the 54th conducted countless extensive denial missions in Kuwait and Iraq, and constructed redeployment areas in Saudi Arabia.

Later that year, the 54th redeployed to Germany in support of the 11th ACR as a mobile U.S. Army European force. The 54th was inactivated in 1994 and reactivated in 1997 as part of the 130th Engineer Brigade. In 2002, select units from the Battalion reorganized as infantry in support of operations in Kosovo, returning later that year.

In February 2003, the 54th deployed with the 3rd Infantry Division to support the Liberation of Iraq. The unit controlled the initial breach into Iraq and installed assault bridges for the invasion. After shifting to stability operations, the 54th found and destroyed weapons caches and conducted engineer reconnaissance. In 2005, 2008, 2009, and 2011, the 54th continuously deployed to Iraq and Afghanistan in support of Operation Iraqi Freedom and Operation Enduring Freedom, responsible for assured mobility and training partner forces. Maneuver commanders insisted on having “Dagger” at the front, as they cleared over 200,000 km of roads, detected thousands of IEDs, and constructed miles of barriers. The 54th returned to Germany and was inactivated in 2014.

=== 173rd Special Troops Battalion (BSTB) ===
The 173rd Special Troops Battalion (BSTB) was formed as part of a reorganization of the 173d Airborne Brigade into a modular brigade. The battalion was designed to be the self-contained command component of the brigade, allowing it to function independently of any higher command. The battalion was activated on 8 June 2006. Most of its components were drawn from the 82nd Engineer Battalion, which inactivated on 30 March 2006. On 21 April 2006, a coat of arms and a distinctive unit insignia were approved for the battalion.

The 173rd Airborne Brigade previously had organic enabler units throughout its existence. Companies such as the 173rd Engineer Company were involved in the Vietnam War's Battle of Dak To and the clearance of North Vietnamese Tunnels, providing engineer support throughout the Brigade's history. These missions were absorbed into the new BSTB to provide a subordinate command structure for these enabler units.

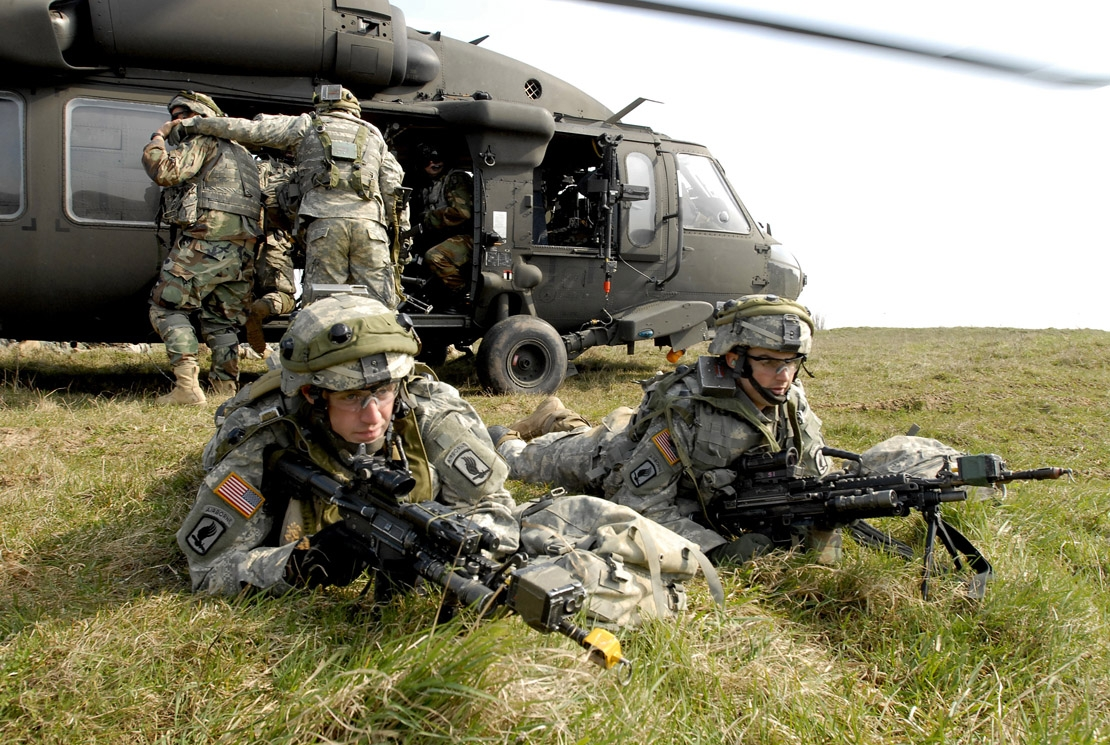
173rd Soldiers conduct air assault training in Germany (2007)

On 11 October 2006, the 173d Airborne Brigade was redesignated as the 173d Airborne Brigade Combat Team (ABCT), as part of the Army's "Unit of Action" modularized unit force restructuring that General Eric Shinseki had originally envisioned. This was a significant change as it signified the ability for the brigade to deploy its forces and sustain itself with its newly integrated support teams. By integrating these support elements, the unit became able to maintain its fighting forces with all that is required to keep the ground soldiers supplied and moving. While most of the brigade remained in Vicenza, Italy through the transition, four of the battalions had to relocate to Bamberg and Schweinfurt, Germany until additional facilities were constructed in the Vicenza area. The 1st Battalion, 508th Infantry was reflagged as 1st Battalion, 503d Infantry to resume the Vietnam-era lineage of the 503d Infantry battalions under the 173d Airborne Brigade. The colors of the 1st Battalion, 508th Infantry were moved to Ft. Bragg, North Carolina to serve under the 82d Airborne Division. Immediately after its transformation, the brigade began intensive training in both Germany and Italy to prepare itself for future deployments.

In 2006, the brigade was notified for a second tour of duty in Iraq during 2007–2008, but its deployment plan was changed to Afghanistan in February 2007 when the Pentagon announced that it would relieve the 3rd Brigade Combat Team, 10th Mountain Division along with the 4th Brigade Combat Team, 82nd Airborne Division. In the spring of 2007, the 173d ABCT again deployed to Afghanistan, as Task Force Bayonet, in support of Operation Enduring Freedom (OEF 07–09), their first deployment as a fully transformed brigade combat team. The brigade was dispersed throughout the east of the country, with units operating in Nangarhar, Nuristan, Kunar, and Laghman Provinces. The 173d ABCT officially relieved the 3rd Brigade Combat Team, 10th Mountain Division on 6 June 2007. The battalion deployed in 2007 conducted security operations in Nangarhar, Afghanistan and built two COPs (Lone Star and Ghosta) to secure the Afghan-Pakistan border.

The 173d participated in various operations with the objective of ensuring security and subduing Taliban insurgents in the mountainous regions along Afghanistan's border with Pakistan, one of these being Operation Rock Avalanche near the Hindu Kush. Throughout their 15-month deployment, the brigade participated in more than 9,000 patrols throughout the region. Only two weeks before the brigade was to return to Italy, a platoon of 45 soldiers from the brigade stationed in the Dara-I-Pech district was caught in an ambush by 100–200 insurgents, the Battle of Wanat. Though the platoon was able to drive the insurgents back with air support, the fight resulted in 9 soldiers killed and 16 wounded; the deadliest attack on troops in the country since 2005. The brigade repositioned the base three days later. The 173rd's tour ended in July 2008, and the entire brigade returned to Italy by the end of that month.

The battalion deployed to Afghanistan again in October 2009. TF Raptor partnered with a Jordanian Task Force (TF 222) to conduct population-centric counter-insurgency operations in Northern Logar Province. TF Raptor established a secure environment for Afghans to conduct a free, transparent and fair general election.

The brigade began its fourth deployment to Afghanistan in early 2010. In July 2012, 54th Brigade Engineer Battalion deployed to FOB Shank for a nine-month deployment. TF Raptor provided base defense, communication/ intelligence support, and route clearance operations for units throughout the 173rd Brigade's area of operation.

On 17 June 2015 the Special Troops Battalion, 173d ABCT was officially reflagged as the 54th Engineer Battalion, a unit with a lineage separate from that of the STB, 173d ABCT. It has since added a second combat engineer company to the ranks.

On 13 June 2025 the 54th Engineering Brigade was restructured into the 173rd Combat Engineering Company at a ceremony on Caserma Del Din, Vicenza Italy.

== Honors ==
=== Unit decorations ===
The 54th Brigade Engineer Battalion's decorations are as follows:

Ribbon	Award	Year	Notes
	Presidential Unit Citation (Army)	2003	For service in Iraq
	Meritorious Unit Commendation (Army)	2008-2009	For service in Iraq
	Meritorious Unit Commendation (Army)	2010-2011	For service in Afghanistan
	Navy Unit Commendation	2006-2007	For service in Anbar Province, Iraq

Additionally, Company B is entitled to:

Ribbon	Award	Year	Notes
	Valorious Unit Award	1991	For service in Iraq and Kuwait

=== Campaign streamers ===
1st Combat Engineer Regiment of the 3rd Canadian Division and 54th Engineer Battalion of the 173rd Airborne BCT during Iron Sword 2016 exercise.

Conflict	Streamer	Year(s)
World War 1	No Inscription	
World War 2	Algeria - French Morocco (with Arrowhead)	
World War 2	Tunisia	
World War 2	Sicily (with Arrowhead)	
World War 2	Normandy (with Arrowhead)	
World War 2	Northern France	
World War 2	Rhineland	
World War 2	Ardennes - Alsace	
World War 2	Central Europe	
Southwest Asia	Liberation and Defense of Kuwait	
Southwest Asia	Cease-Fire	
War on Terrorism	Iraqi Surge	
War on Terrorism	Iraqi Sovereignty	
Operation Iraqi Freedom	Iraq	2003
Operation Iraqi Freedom	Iraq	2008-2009
Operation Iraqi Freedom	Anbar Province	2006-2007
Operation Enduring Freedom	Afghanistan	2010-2011
Operation Enduring Freedom	Afghanistan (as STB)	2007–2008
