= Edward Clark (architect) =

American architect (1822–1902)

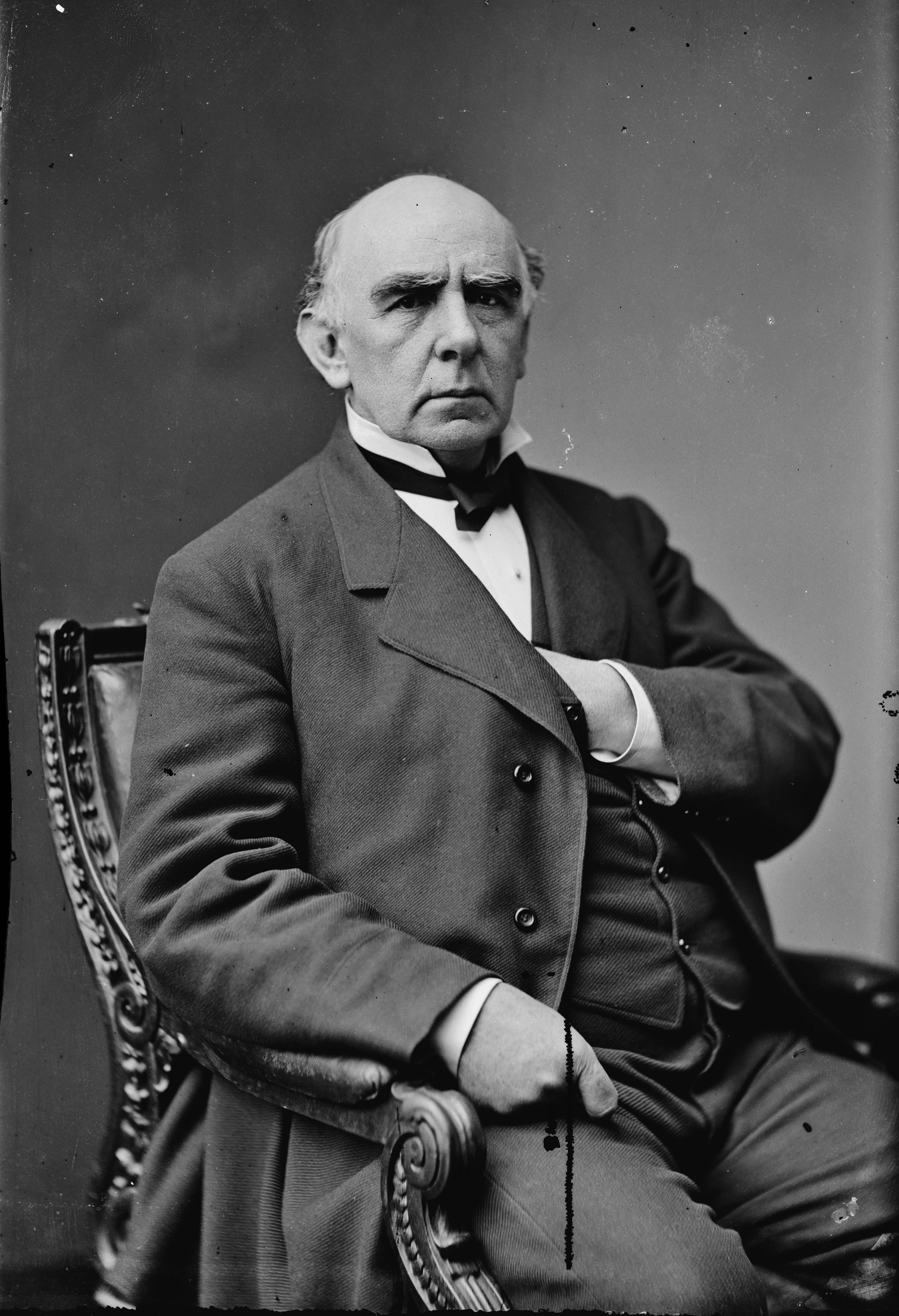
- Clark, 1870–1880

Architect of the Capitol
- In office August 30, 1865 – January 6, 1902
- President: Andrew Johnson; Ulysses S. Grant; Rutherford B. Hayes; James A. Garfield; Chester A. Arthur; Grover Cleveland; Benjamin Harrison; William McKinley; Theodore Roosevelt
- Preceded by: Thomas U. Walter
- Succeeded by: Elliot Woods

Personal details
- Born: August 15, 1822 Philadelphia, Pennsylvania, U.S.
- Died: January 6, 1902 (aged 79) Washington, D.C., U.S.
- Occupation: Architect
- Buildings: United States Capitol dome; old Patent Office Building; D.C. General Post Office; Iowa State Capitol

Edward Clark (August 15, 1822 – January 6, 1902) was an American architect who served as Architect of the Capitol from 1865 to 1902.

== Life and career ==
Clark was born in August 1822 in Philadelphia, Pennsylvania, to James and Mary (née Cottman) Clark. His grandfather, Michael Clark, was of English stock from Lancashire, England, but born in Dublin, Ireland. Michael Clark emigrated to the United States at the end of the American Revolutionary War to avoid anti-Catholic persecution in England. Edward Clark's father, James, was one of Michael's three sons, and was an architect in Philadelphia and a well-known teacher of architectural drawing. Edward Clark's mother, Mary, was the daughter of John Cottman, a captain in the Pennsylvania Regiment during the American Revolution.

Edward Clark was educated in both public and private schools in Philadelphia. He received his architectural training from his uncle, Thomas Clark, who was an engineer in the United States Army Corps of Engineers. He received training in architectural and free-hand drawing from his father.

While still in his late teens, Clark was apprenticed to the nationally known Philadelphia architect Thomas U. Walter. As an apprentice, he helped Walter design and plan the buildings for Girard College. In 1851, Walter was appointed the Architect of the Capitol and charged with designing and building the United States Capitol dome and the north (Senate) and south (House) wings of the United States Capitol. Clark accompanied Walter to Washington, D.C., and was Walter's chief assistant on the three projects. Although Walter was author of the general plan and layout of the dome wings, nearly all the detail work was done by Clark. While architectural and planning work progressed on the dome in the 1850s, Clark also assisted Walter in completing the U.S. Patent Office Building and the D.C. General Post Office building.

During the American Civil War, Clark also designed and oversaw the construction of numerous arsenals, forts, and hospitals in the Washington, D.C., area.

Clark was appointed Capitol architect by President Andrew Johnson upon his mentor's resignation on August 30, 1865, and completed the extension project in 1868. Clark introduced many technological improvements to the Capitol, including electricity, steam heat, and elevators. During Clark's tenure, the Capitol Grounds were greatly enlarged and Frederick Law Olmsted, the greatest landscape architect of the day, was commissioned to design the grounds and terraces. Also during Clark's administration, the Library of Congress moved to its own building, and the west central interior of the Capitol was reconstructed.

In 1872, Clark was hired by the state of Iowa to revise plans for the Iowa State Capitol, whose original design had proven too costly to build. Clark retained the general plan of the building, and (working closely with original co-designer Alfred H. Piquenard), revised the plans. It was Clark's building which was eventually constructed.

== Personal life and death ==
Edward Clark loved literature, and owned one of the largest private libraries in the city at the time of his death. Although not a musician himself, he loved music and had one of the largest private music libraries in the region. He spoke French, Italian, and Latin, and his library contained a large number of works about architecture written in those languages. An ardent art admirer, he was a close friend of William Wilson Corcoran, who founded the Corcoran Gallery of Art. Clark sat on the Corcoran Gallery's board of trustees from its founding, and was at his death the longest-serving trustee.

Clark was a member of the Clarendon Historical Society of Edinburgh, the American Institute of Architects, the Archaeological Institute of America, the American Institute for the Advancement of Science, the Franklin Institute, the American Forestry Association, and the Washington Monument Society.

Clark married Evelyn F. Freeman of Boston, Massachusetts, in 1860. She was a descendant of Sir Edward Freeman, one of the first settlers of Cape Cod. They had two sons, Edward and Watson, and twin daughters, Eveline and Charlotte. Evelyn Clark died in 1896.

Clark was enfeebled by old age in the last two years of his life. He died on January 6, 1902, at his home in Washington, D.C., of an undisclosed illness from which he had suffered for several weeks. An Episcopalian, he was buried at Rock Creek Cemetery in Washington, D.C.

Political offices
| Preceded by Thomas U. Walter | Architect of the Capitol; 1865–1902 | Succeeded by Elliott Woods |
