= J. George Stewart =

American politician and architect

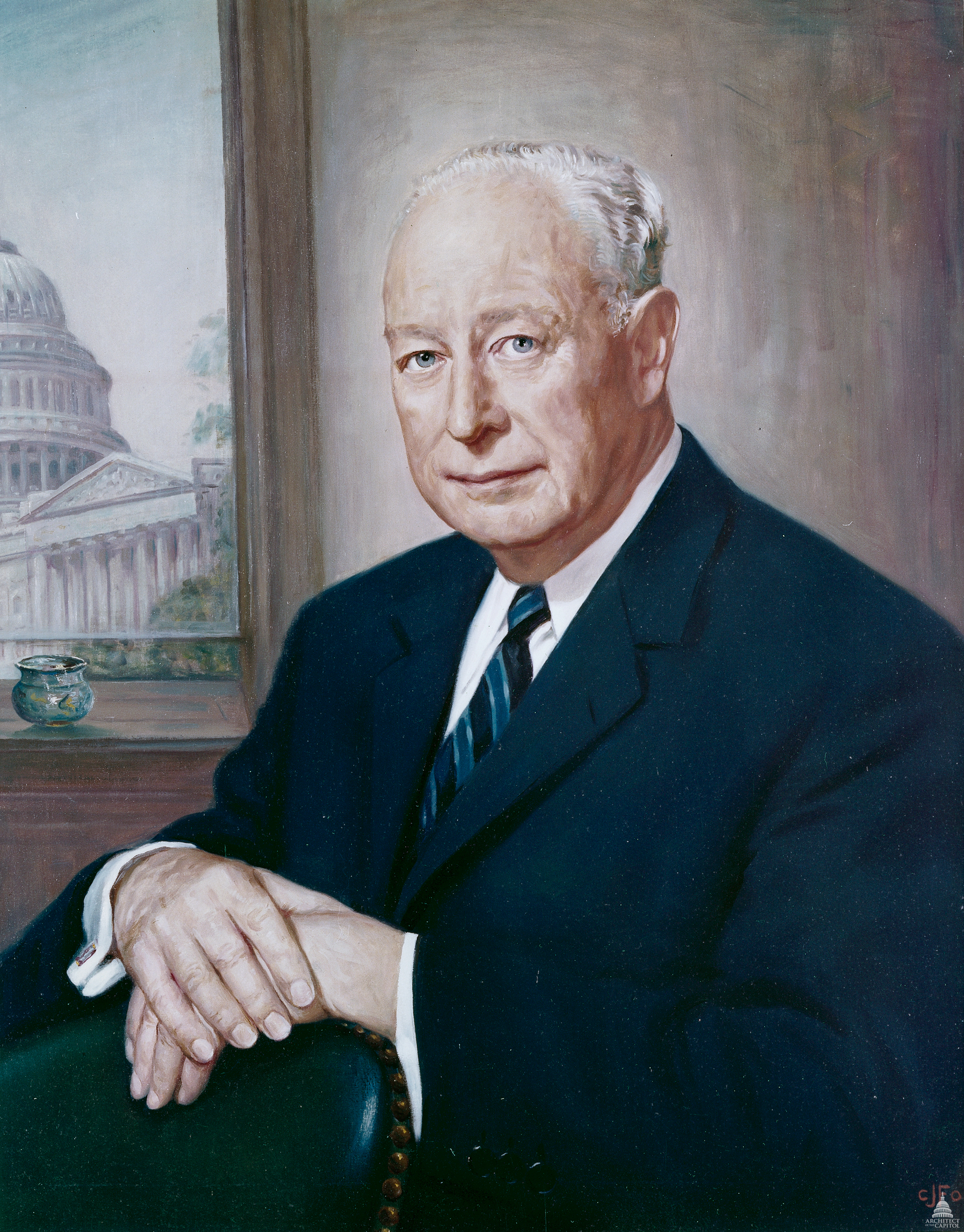
- Stewart by C. J. Fox (Irving Resnikoff)

Architect of the Capitol
- In office October 1, 1954 – May 24, 1970
- President: Dwight D. Eisenhower; John F. Kennedy; Lyndon B. Johnson; Richard M. Nixon
- Preceded by: David Lynn
- Succeeded by: George M. White

Member of the U.S. House of Representatives from Delaware's at-large district
- In office January 3, 1935 – January 3, 1937
- Preceded by: Wilbur L. Adams
- Succeeded by: William F. Allen

Personal details
- Born: June 2, 1890 Wilmington, Delaware, U.S.
- Died: May 24, 1970 (aged 79) Washington, D.C., U.S
- Party: Republican
- Education: University of Delaware
- Profession: Civil engineer

John George Stewart (June 2, 1890 – May 24, 1970) was an American architect and politician from Wilmington, Delaware. He was a member of the Republican Party, who served as U.S. Representative from Delaware and as Architect of the Capitol. He was known by his middle name.

== Early life and family ==
Stewart was born in Wilmington, Delaware. He attended the public schools of Wilmington and the University of Delaware in Newark. He worked in the landscape construction business from 1919 until 1942, during which time he was a member of the Delaware Athletic Commission from 1931 until 1934, and a commissioner on the Delaware Emergency Relief Commission in 1934.

== Professional and political career ==
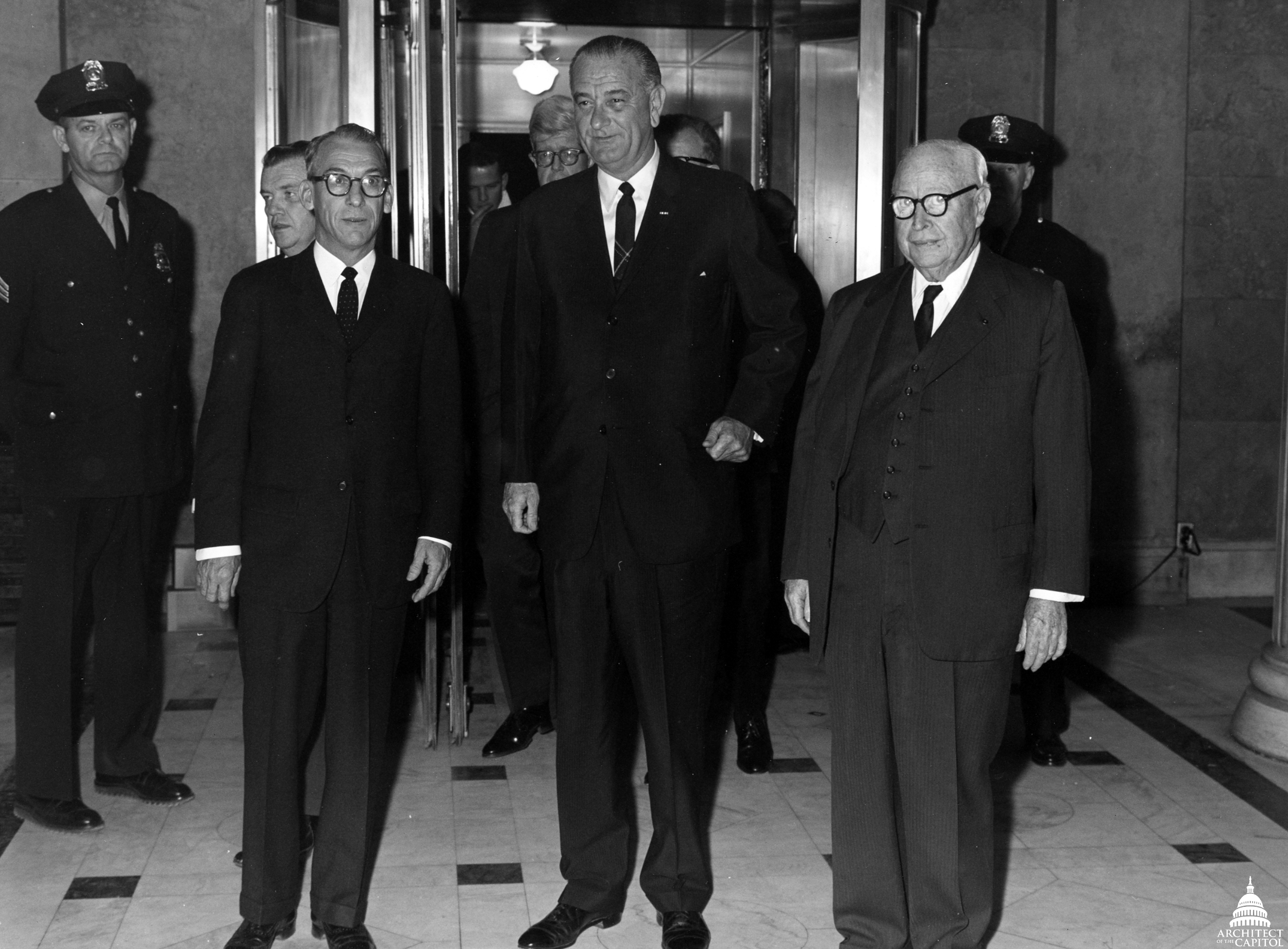
Stewart (right) escorts President Lyndon B. Johnson to the 1965 State of the Union Address

Stewart was elected to the U.S. House of Representatives in 1934, defeating Democrat John C. Hazzard. He served in the Republican minority in the 74th Congress from January 3, 1935, until January 3, 1937, during the first administration of U.S. President Franklin D. Roosevelt, but lost his bid for a second term in 1936 to Democrat William F. Allen.

Ten years later, he became a member of the staff of the United States Senate Committee on the District of Columbia, and served there from 1947 until 1951. He was special engineer to the lands division of the United States Department of Justice and U.S. Army Corps of Engineers in 1952–1953, and was a civil engineer in Hollywood, Florida, in 1954. U.S. President Dwight D. Eisenhower appointed him to be Architect of the Capitol, and he served in that position from October 1, 1954, until his death.

== Death and legacy ==
Stewart died in Washington, D.C., and is buried in the Lower Brandywine Cemetery, near Centerville, Delaware.

== Almanac ==
Elections are held the first Tuesday after November 1. U.S. Representatives take office January 3 and have a two-year term.

Public offices
Office	Type	Location	Began office	Ended office	Notes
U.S. Representative	Legislature	Washington, D.C.	January 3, 1935	January 3, 1937	

United States Congressional service
Dates	Congress	Chamber	Majority	President	Committees	Class/District
1935–1937	74th	U.S. House	Democratic	Franklin D. Roosevelt		at-large

Election results
Year	Office	Subject	Party	votes	%	Opponent	Party	votes	%
1934	U.S. Representative	J. George Stewart	Republican	52,468	53%	John C. Hazzard	Democratic	45,927	46%
1936	U.S. Representative	J. George Stewart	Republican	55,664	44%	William F. Allen	Democratic	65,485	52%

U.S. House of Representatives
Preceded by Wilbur L. Adams	Member of the U.S. House of Representatives from Delaware's at-large congressional district 1935–1937	Succeeded by William F. Allen
Preceded by David Lynn	Architect of the Capitol; 1954–1970	Succeeded by George M. White
