= Stephen T. Ayers =

American architect (born 1962)

Stephen Ayers
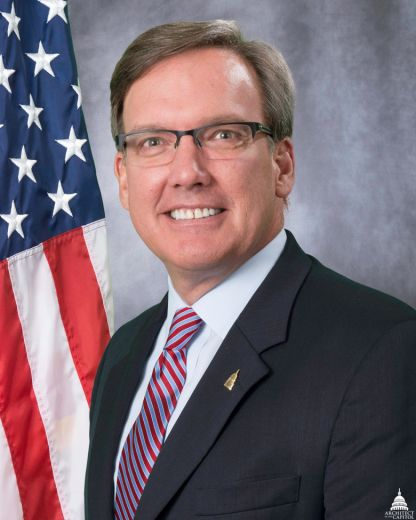

Architect of the Capitol
- In office February 2, 2007 – November 23, 2018; Acting: February 2, 2007 – May 12, 2010
- President: George W. Bush; Barack Obama; Donald Trump
- Preceded by: Alan Hantman
- Succeeded by: Brett Blanton

Personal details
- Born: 1962 (age 63–64) Roanoke, Virginia, U.S.
- Education: University of Maryland, College Park (BS); University of Southern California (MS)

Stephen T. Ayers (born 1962) is an American architect who served as the 11th Architect of the Capitol, from 2010 to 2018.

Ayers has been a Fellow of the National Academy of Public Administration since 2020.

== Biography ==
Ayers served in the United States Air Force from 1985 to 1990. and a licensed architect in the State of California.

In February 2007, Ayers assumed the office as Acting Architect.

On May 12, 2010, Ayers was unanimously confirmed as permanent Architect by the United States Senate.

Ayers was the first Architect of the Capitol to be certified as an Accredited Professional in the U.S. Green Building Council's Leadership in Energy and Environmental Design (LEED) program. He sought to reduce energy consumption on Capitol Hill.

In 2011, Ayers received the Carroll H. Dunn Award of Excellence from the Construction Industry Institute. He retired from the role of Architect of the Capitol on November 23, 2018.

Political offices
Preceded by Alan Hantman	Architect of the Capitol; 2007–2018	Succeeded by Brett Blanton
