= George Malcolm White =

American architect

George M. White
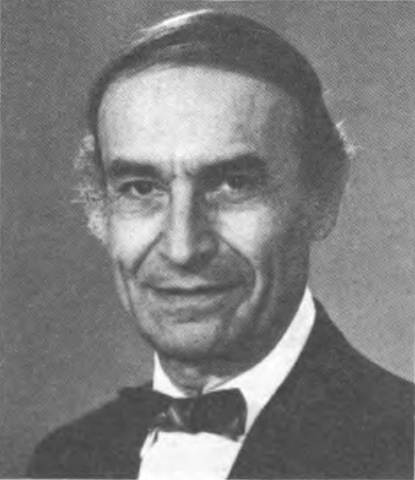

Architect of the Capitol
- In office January 27, 1971 – November 21, 1995
- President: Richard M. Nixon; Gerald Ford; Jimmy Carter; Ronald Reagan; George H. W. Bush; Bill Clinton
- Preceded by: J. George Stewart
- Succeeded by: Alan Hantman

Personal details
- Born: November 1, 1920 Cleveland, Ohio
- Died: June 17, 2011 (aged 90) Bethesda, Maryland
- Education: Massachusetts Institute of Technology
- Occupation: Architect

George Malcolm White (November 1, 1920 – June 17, 2011) was an American architect who served as the Architect of the Capitol from January 27, 1971 to November 21, 1995.

== Life ==
He was born in Cleveland, Ohio and attended the Massachusetts Institute of Technology at the age of sixteen. He graduated with a B.S. and an M.S. in electrical engineering in 1941. He later received an M.B.A. from Harvard and a J.D. from Case Western Reserve University. He oversaw the construction of the Library of Congress James Madison Memorial Building and the Hart Senate Office Building, as well as the restoration of the old Supreme Court and Senate chambers.

Political offices
Preceded by J. George Stewart	Architect of the Capitol; 1971–1995	Succeeded by Alan Hantman
