= Alan Hantman =

American architect (born 1942)

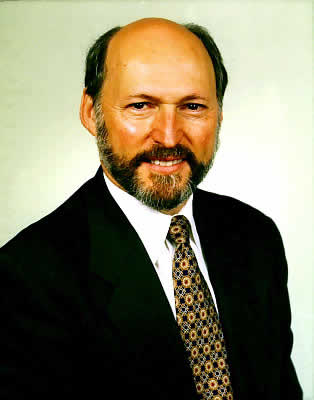

Architect of the Capitol
- In office January 6, 1997 – February 2, 2007
- President: Bill Clinton; George W. Bush
- Preceded by: George M. White
- Succeeded by: Stephen T. Ayers

Personal details
- Born: October 13, 1942 (age 84) New York City
- Education: City College of New York
- Profession: Architect
- Awards: Fellow of the American Institute of Architects

Alan Michael Hantman (born October 13, 1942) is an American architect who served as the 10th Architect of the Capitol from January 1997 until February 2007. As Architect of the Capitol, he was responsible to the United States Congress for the maintenance, operation, development, and preservation of the United States Capitol Complex.

During the week of July 24, 2006, Hantman informed the House and Senate leadership that he would not seek a second ten-year term. Upon Hantman's retirement on February 2, 2007, the Chief Operating Officer of the Architect of the Capitol, Stephen T. Ayers, became the Acting Architect of the Capitol, and was subsequently confirmed to that post in his own right.

Hantman graduated from the City College of New York with a bachelor's degree in architecture and earned a master's degree in urban planning from the City University of New York Graduate Center. He is a fellow of the American Institute of Architects, is certified by the National Council of Architectural Registration Boards and is currently licensed in the state of New York. Prior to his appointment he was Vice President of Facilities Planning and Architecture for the Rockefeller Center Management Corporation of New York City for 10 years and then served as their consultant. He received the Sidney L. Strauss Award from the New York Society of Architects for his work at the Center.

A long-time resident of Teaneck, New Jersey, Hantman subsequently relocated to nearby Fort Lee. He was involved in a project to develop a Holocaust memorial that would be located on the Teaneck municipal green.

Political offices
Preceded by George M. White	Architect of the Capitol; 1997–2007	Succeeded by Stephen T. Ayers
