= Page (assistance occupation) =

Attendant or servant

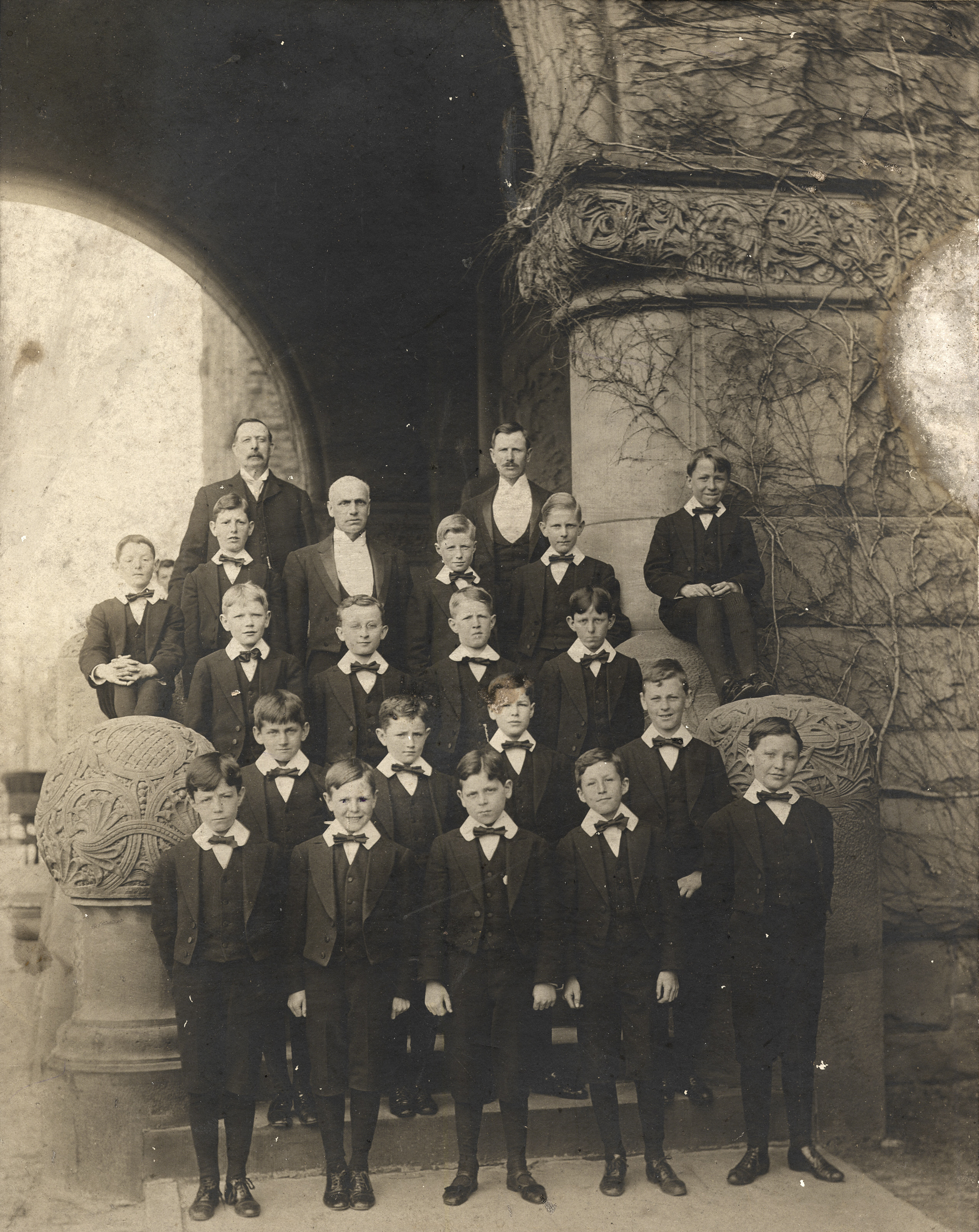
A group of legislative pages at the Ontario Legislative Building in Toronto, circa 1893.

A page is an occupation in some professional capacity. Unlike traditional pages, who are normally younger males, these pages tend to be older and can be either male or female.

== Workplace ==
Pages are present in some modern workforces. American television network NBC's page program is a notable example of contemporary workplace pages.

== Libraries ==
Some large libraries use the term 'page' for employees or volunteers who retrieve books from the stacks, which are often closed to the public, and return books to shelves. This relieves some of the tedium from the librarians, who may occupy themselves with duties requiring their more advanced training and education.

== Legislative pages ==
Many legislative bodies employ student pages as assistants to members of the legislature during session. Legislative pages are secondary school or university students who are unpaid or receive modest stipends. They serve for periods of time ranging from one week to one year, depending on the program. They typically perform small tasks such as running errands, delivering coffee, answering telephones, or assisting a speaker with visual aids. Students typically participate primarily for the work-experience benefits.

The following examples illustrate the range of legislative page programs:

Canada

- The Canadian House of Commons Page Program for Pages to the lower chamber of the Canadian House of Commons in the Parliament of the Dominion of Canada, meeting in the federal capital city of Ottawa, Ontario, employs part-time first-year university students who work roughly 15 hours a week and are paid approximately $12,000 (CDN) for a one-year term. They perform both ceremonial and administrative duties and participate in enrichment activities such as meetings with MPs and government leaders. They also meet with student groups to explain the workings of the House of Commons and their duties as Pages. The Canadian Senate Page Program for the Parliament's upper chamber of the Senate of Canada is similar.
- The Legislative Assembly of Ontario in the Province of Ontario,which meets in the Ontario Legislative Building in the provincial capital city of Toronto, employs 7th and 8th grade students for periods of two to six weeks during the legislative sessions. Participants must be high-achieving students who take leaves of absence from their schools while they serve as pages. Duties of pages include acting as messengers in the legislative chamber, taking water to MPPs, and picking up key documents (bills, petitions, motions, reports by committee). They also have opportunities to learn about provincial government and the lawmaking process.
- The Legislative Assembly of Alberta in the Province of Alberta, meeting in the Alberta Legislative Building in their provincial capital city of Edmonton, employs high school and first-year university students, as a part-time job. Pages must demonstrate strong academic standing, have work experience and participate in extracurricular activities, and be able to commit to a job. Some duties of pages include distributing materials within the provincial legislature, supporting public events such as Family Day and Canada Day (July 1, 1867), and participating in development seminars.

United States

- Both houses of the United States Congress in the United States Capitol at Washington, D.C. have or formerly had longtime formal page programs for almost two centuries. The lower chamber of the House of Representatives pages program had ended in 2011 after 185 years (since 1827/1839), because of some controversial scandals. But the Senate Page program for the upper chamber of the United States Senate still continues since 1829 (expanded in 1971, to include girls), with a reorganized / renovated Daniel Webster Senate Page Residence dormitory, located several blocks northeast of the United States Capitol, near the adjacent Hart Senate Office Building; pages are high school juniors from throughout the country. The application process is very competitive. Pages serve for periods of several weeks during the summer or for a full school semester during Senate legislative term. They live in dormitories near the Capitol and attend special schools for pages, but are always present on the Senate and previously House of Representatives floor during congressional sessions to assist the proceedings and legislators as needed.
- In the Virginia General Assembly (state legislature) at the Virginia State Capitol in Richmond, the pages are young males and females ranging in age from 13 to 15. They assist Senators and Delegates with deliveries and errands.
- The Nebraska Legislature at the Nebraska State Capitol in Lincoln has a page program, in which college students assist Senators and legislative staff with various deliveries and errands. The selection process includes an application and interview, with competitive candidates presenting a letter of recommendation from a member of the Legislature. Pages are employed by the Clerk of the Legislature, and often receive course credit for participating.
- The South Dakota State Legislature at the South Dakota State Capitol in Pierre, South Dakota has a page program open to juniors and seniors in high school with seniors being preferred. Pages are appointed to serve in the South Dakota House of Representatives or the South Dakota Senate for four to nine days during one of the five term periods available. In order to be appointed students must fill out an application with a signature from a legislative sponsor. The presiding officer of each choose their respective pages based on the application. Once select pages man phones, run errands for legislators, sit in on committees and session, and get a chance to meet the South Dakota State Governor and a special tour of the Capitol Building. Pages are paid $55 per day and are overseen officially by the presiding officer of the houses with the Page Advisor overseeing daily work.

== See also ==
- Page (servant)
