= Page program =

Page program may refer to:

- United States House of Representatives Page
- United States Senate Page
- Canadian House of Commons Page Program
- Canadian Senate Page Program
