= Page (servant) =

Young male attendant or servant

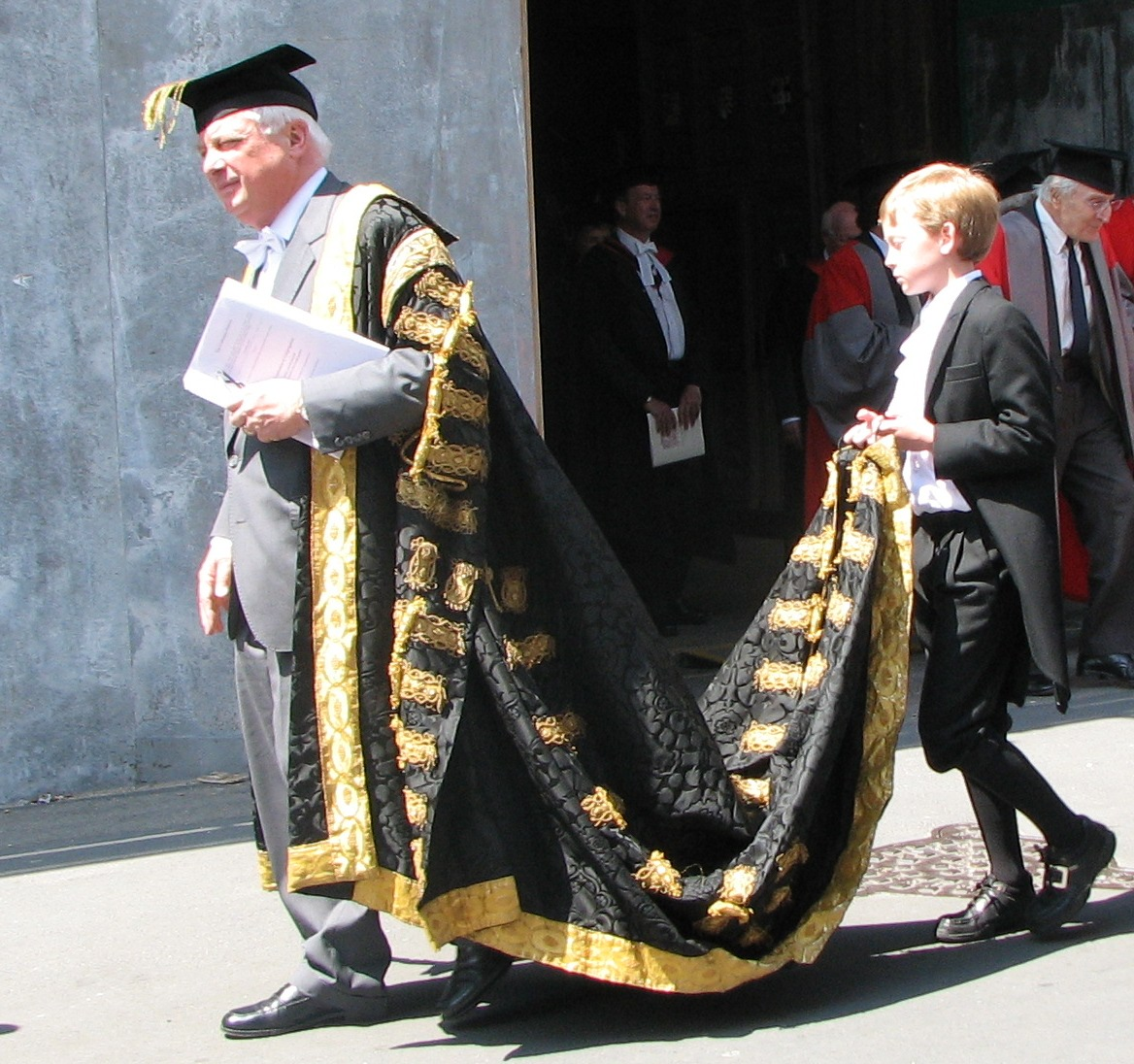
Lord Patten, robed as Chancellor of Oxford University, assisted by a page

A page or page boy is traditionally a young male attendant or servant, but may also have been a messenger in the service of a nobleman.

During wedding ceremonies, a page boy is often used as a symbolic attendant to carry the rings.

== Etymology ==
The origin of the term is uncertain, but it may come either from the Latin pagius (servant), possibly linked to peasant, or an earlier Greek word παῖς (pais = child).

== The medieval page ==
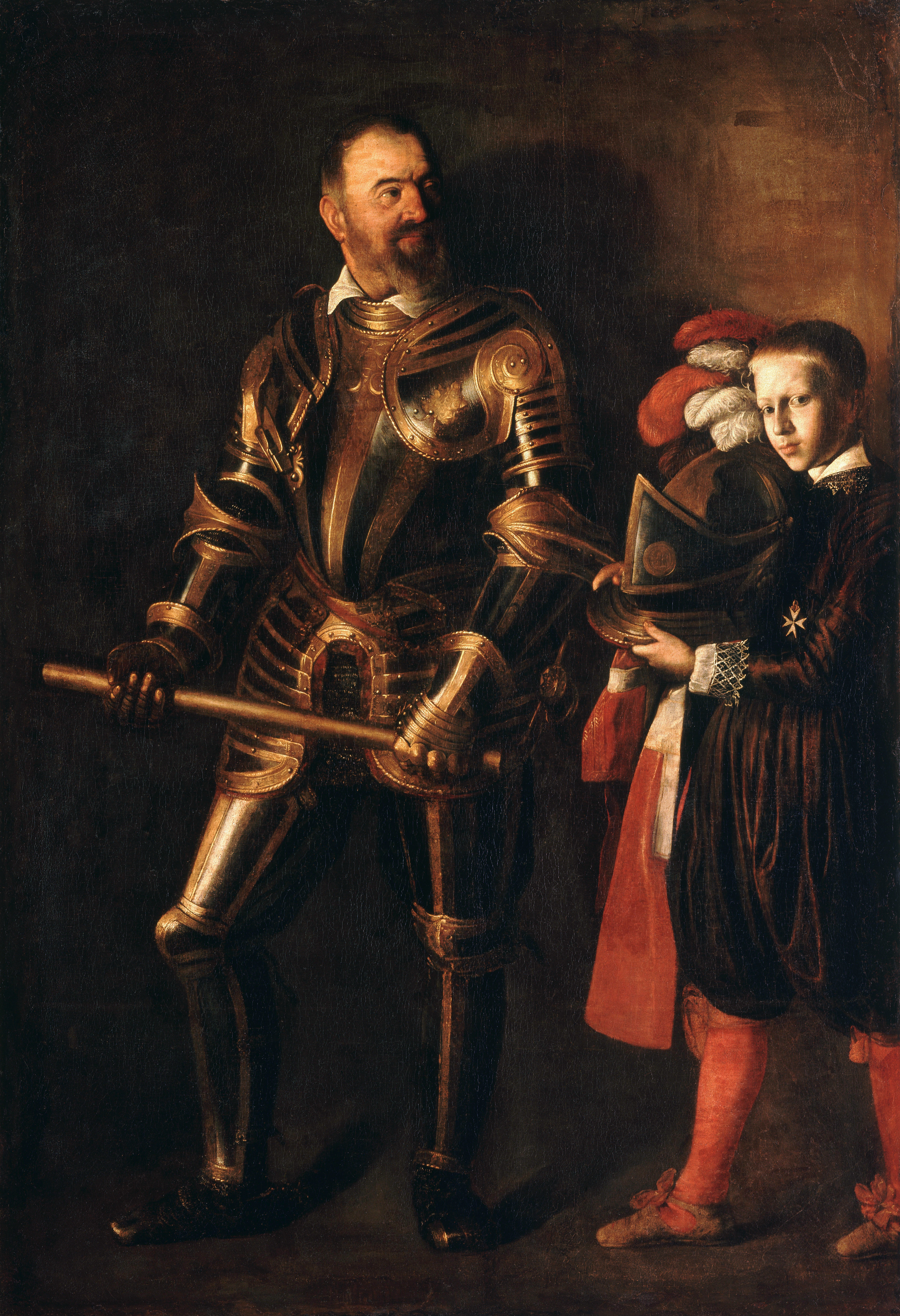
Alof de Wignacourt and his page, by Caravaggio, c. 1608

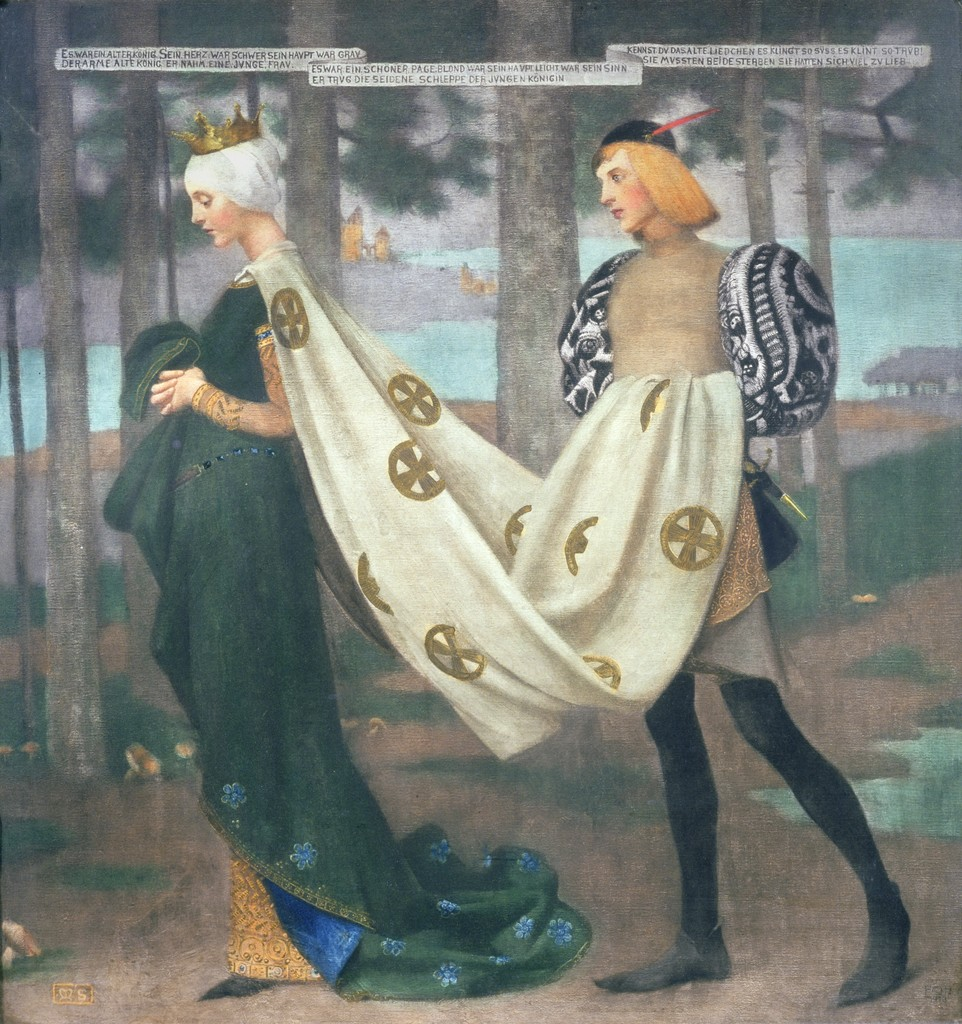
The Queen and the Page, by Marianne Stokes, 1896

In medieval times, a page was an attendant to a nobleman, a knight, a governor or a castellan. Until the age of about seven, sons of noble families would receive training in manners and basic literacy from their mothers or other female relatives. Upon reaching seven years of age, a boy would be sent to the castle, great house or other estate of another noble family. This would match the age at which apprenticeships or servants' employment would be entered into by young males from lower social classes.

A young boy served as a page for about seven years, running messages, serving, cleaning clothing and weapons, and learning the basics of combat. He might be required to arm or dress the lord to whom he had been sent by his own family. Personal service of this nature was not considered as demeaning, in the context of shared noble status by page and lord. It was seen rather as a form of education in return for labour. While a page did not receive reimbursement other than clothing, accommodation and food, he could be rewarded for an exceptional act of service. In return for his work, the page would receive training in horse-riding, hunting, hawking and combat – the essential skills required of adult men of his rank in medieval society.

Less physical training included schooling in the playing of musical instruments, the composition and singing of songs, and the learning of board games such as chess. The initial education received as a child in reading and writing would be continued to a level of modest competence under the tuition of a chaplain or other cleric, and possibly from a grammar master. They also learned courtly manners and, in attending to the needs of their master, a degree of temporary humility.

Medieval pages might accompany their lords to war. While their roles in battle were generally limited to secondary assistance and minor support functions, pages might expect to participate directly in siege situations. This could occur when a castle was under attack and crossbows were available for use by pages among the defenders. The mechanical and long-range nature of these devices made them almost the only medieval weapon which could be employed effectively by a youth.

At age fourteen, the young noble could graduate to become a squire, and by age 21, perhaps a knight himself. These boys were often the scions of other great families who were sent to learn the ways of the manorial system by observation. Their residence in the house served as a goodwill gesture between the two families involved and helped them gain social and political contacts for their adult lives. A reference to this kind of page is found in the Christmas carol Good King Wenceslaus: "Hither, page, and stand by me, if thou know'st it, telling..."

A page may also have shared the broad designation of quistroun with various lower-status kitchen servants such as scullions or knaves.

== The household page ==
Until the early 20th century, boys of humble background might gain a similar place in a great house. According to the International Butler Academy, these pages were apprentice footmen. Unlike the hall boys, who did heavy work, these pages performed light odd-jobs and stood in attendance wearing livery when guests were being received.

== The decorative page ==
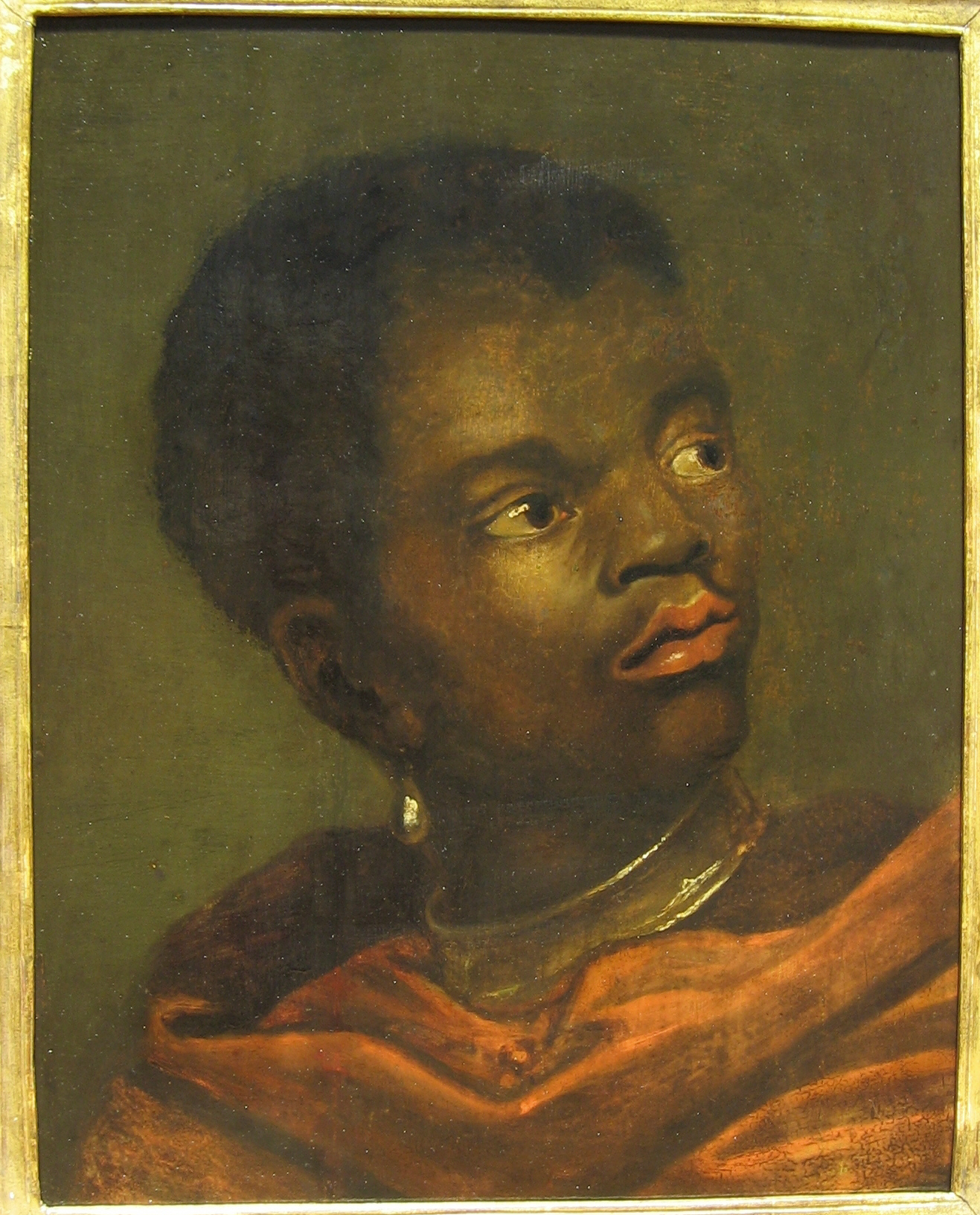
Painting of a page boy with slave collar, Dutch, 17th century

During and following the Renaissance, it became fashionable for black boys and young men to be decorative pages, placed into fancy costumes and attending fashionable ladies and lords. This custom lasted for several centuries and the "African page" became a staple accoutrement of baroque and rococo style.

The character is frequently illustrated in literature and film, particularly periodwork:

- In the Grace Kelly film To Catch a Thief, an undercover detective wears the costume of her "African page" to a costume ball.
- Valentine Nwanze played an "African page" attending James Graham, Marquess of Montrose in the film Rob Roy.
- "Koko", the fictional manservant of an opera diva, is cast as her African page in A Nut at the Opera by Maurice Vellekoop.
- Decorative pages feature in a drawing room scene in Persuasion.
- In the 2012 historical drama film A Royal Affair, Christian VII has an African page boy named Moranti.

Similarly, Oriental pages were periodically in fashion, e.g. in Napoleonic France since Bonaparte's conquest of Ottoman Egypt.

== Modern pages ==
While the traditional pages are rare in the modern private workforce, US television network NBC's page program is a notable example of contemporary workplace pages.

Pages exist in political contexts, such as US Senate pages, and the Canadian Senate Page Program and Canadian House of Commons Page Program.

== See also ==
- Page of Honour
- Page (assistance occupation)
- Slave collar
