= Senate Page Program =

Senate Page Program may refer to

- Canadian Senate Page Program
- United States Senate Page
