= Congressional intern =

A congressional intern may refer to:

- United States House of Representatives Page
- United States Senate Page
