= Robert Hinckley =

Robert Hinckley may refer to:

- Robert H. Hinckley (1891–1988), American businessman and politician
- Robert Cutler Hinckley (1853–1941), American portraitist
