= Webster Hall (disambiguation) =

Webster Hall may refer to:

- Webster Hall, a nightclub in New York City
- Daniel Webster Senate Page Residence, the official residence for United States Senate Pages, also known as "Webster Hall"
- Webster Hall, a building on the campus of Dartmouth College housing the school's special collections library
- Webster Hall, a building on the campus of Phillips Exeter Academy
- Webster Hall, a building on the campus of Southern New Hampshire University
- David Webster Hall of Residence, a building at the University of the Witwatersrand
- Chandler Normal School Building and Webster Hall, a National Register of Historic Places-listed building in Lexington, Kentucky
