= Encounters with Canada =

Encounters With Canada (EWC) was a youth program operated by the Canadian Unity Council in cooperation with numerous Canadian government departments. EWC was founded in 1982. The program was suspended in March 2020 due to the COVID-19 pandemic and closure of the program by Historica Canada was announced on January 12, 2021.

== The Program ==
Taking place throughout most of each school year, participants aged 14–17 from high schools throughout Canada travelled to Ottawa, Ontario (Canada's capital city) and stayed in the Historica Canada Centre. Students were given a choice of the following sub-themes:

- Arts & Culture
- Business & Trade
- Canada Remembers
- First Responders
- Global Affairs
- Law & Our Justice System
- Media & Communications
- Medicine & Health
- Science & Technology
- Sports & Fitness
- Travel & Tourism

Despite these variations, the main theme of the program was unifying Canadians and cultures within Canada and discussing Canada's identity.

In addition to activities related to their week's theme, participants toured and visited Canadian political institutions such as the Parliament of Canada (including the House of Commons of Canada the Senate of Canada) and the Supreme Court of Canada. Some weeks included visits to cultural institutions such as the National Gallery of Canada and the Museum of Civilization.

== See also ==
- Canadian House of Commons Page Program
- Canadian Senate Page Program
