= Slave collar (disambiguation) =

Slave collar may refer to:

- Slave collar, collar used to identify and discipline slaves
- Collar (BDSM), collar used in bondage

== See also ==
- Page (occupation)
- Representation of slavery in European art
- Slave iron bit
