= Bill (United States Congress) =

Form used for most legislation of the United States Congress

In the United States Congress, a bill is proposed legislation under consideration by either of the two chambers of Congress: the House of Representatives or the Senate. Anyone elected to either body can propose a bill. After both chambers approve a bill, it is sent to the President of the United States for consideration.

== Bill writing ==
Ideas for legislation and drafts of legislation can come from many areas, including members of Congress, Congressional committees, constituents, lobbyists, state legislatures, the president, federal departments, and federal agencies. The House Office of the Legislative Counsel and Senate Office of the Legislative Counsel are available to create or modify legislation for members and committees.

== Introduction and sponsors ==
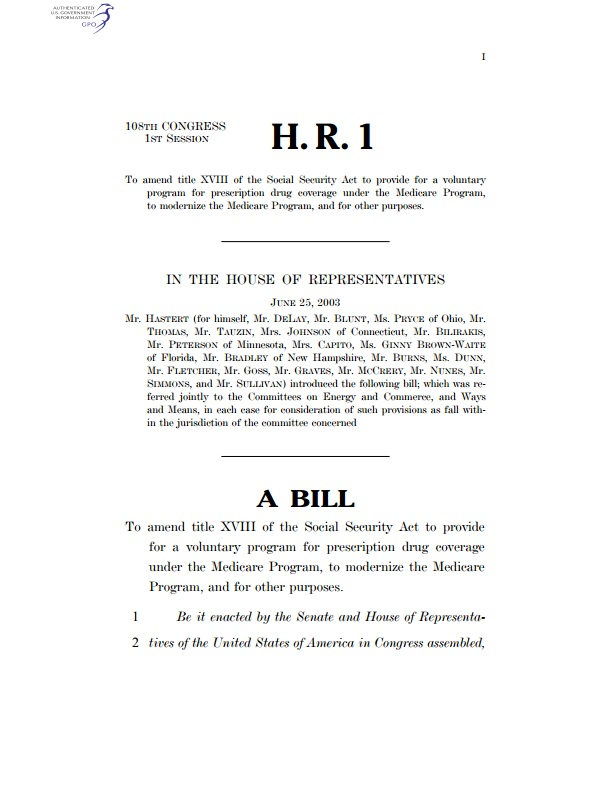
First page of the version of the Medicare Prescription Drug, Improvement, and Modernization Act as introduced in the U.S. House of Representatives, June 25, 2003, as H.R. 1

In the House, a bill is introduced by a member placing a hard copy into a wooden box called a hopper. In the Senate, the bill is placed on the desk of the presiding officer.

The bill must bear the signature of the member introducing it to verify that the member actually intended to introduce the bill. The member is then called the sponsor of that bill. That member may add the names of other members onto the bill who also support it. These members are called co-sponsors. If a member was a co-sponsor and their name was on the bill when it was introduced, they are called an original co-sponsor. Additional co-sponsors to bills are printed in the Congressional Record in a section designated for that purpose. Members may also remove their names as co-sponsors from bills if the bill is later amended such that they no longer support it; this is typically done via a unanimous consent agreement. This action is also included in the Congressional Record.

After a bill is placed in the hopper, the House Clerk's office assigns a bill number, adds the committee(s) of referral, processes the paper and electronic versions of the bill and makes it available online through the Government Publishing Office and the Library of Congress.

== Committees ==
With the assistance of the Parliamentarian, the Speaker of the House refers the bill to one or more committees. These committees consider legislation relating to each policy area of jurisdiction. Thousands of bills are introduced in every session of Congress, and no single member can possibly be adequately informed on all the issues that arise. The committee system is a way to provide for specialization, or a division of the legislative labor. Sometimes called "little legislatures," committees usually have the final say on pieces of legislation. Committees only very rarely are deprived control of a bill, although this kind of action is provided for in the rules of each chamber.

- By far the most important committees in Congress are the Standing Committees, permanent bodies that are established by the rules of each chamber of Congress and that continue from session to session.
- Select Committees are created for a limited time and for a specific legislative purpose. For example, a select committee may be formed to investigate a public problem, such as child nutrition or aging.
- A Joint Committee is formed by the concurrent action of both chambers of Congress and consists of members of each chamber. Joint Committees, which may be permanent or temporary, have dealt with the economy, taxation, and the Library of Congress.
- Conference Committees- No bill can be sent to the White House to be signed into law unless it passes through both chambers in original form. Sometimes called the "third house" of Congress, Conference Committees are in a position to make significant alterations to legislation and frequently become the focal point of policy debates.
- The House Rules Committee- Because of its special "gate-keeping" power over the terms on which legislation will reach the floor of the House of Representatives, the House Rules Committee holds a uniquely powerful position.

== See also ==
- Bill (law)
- Procedures of the United States Congress
