= Morgan Lyon Cotti =

American political scientist

- Born: Utah, United States
- Education: University of Utah, BA; Brigham Young University, MA; George Washington University, PhD
- Occupation: Political scientist

Morgan Lyon Cotti is an American political scientist and, since 2017, is the Associate Director of the Hinckley Institute of Politics.

Cotti's interest in politics began when she was 16 years old and served as a Page of the United States Senate. She obtained degrees from University of Utah and Brigham Young University and completed a PhD in Political Science from George Washington University.

== Career ==
Cotti joined the Utah Foundation in 2011 as an analyst and later the organization's research director. In 2013, Cotti joined the Hinckley Institute of Politics as State and Local Program Director. She later was named Associate Director of the organization. She is also an associate adjunct professor in political science at the University of Utah.

In 2020, Cotti was the volunteer and academic program director for the 2020 United States vice-presidential debate between Kamala Harris and Mike Pence.

Cotti serves on the board of Utah Women Run, a nonpartisan group that works to encourage women to engage in politics and run for office.

== Personal life ==
Cotti lives in Salt Lake City and is married with two children. She is a member of the Church of Jesus Christ of Latter-day Saints.
