= O'Neill House Office Building (1947) =

Former government building in Washington, D.C.

Coordinates: 38°53′09″N 77°00′24″W

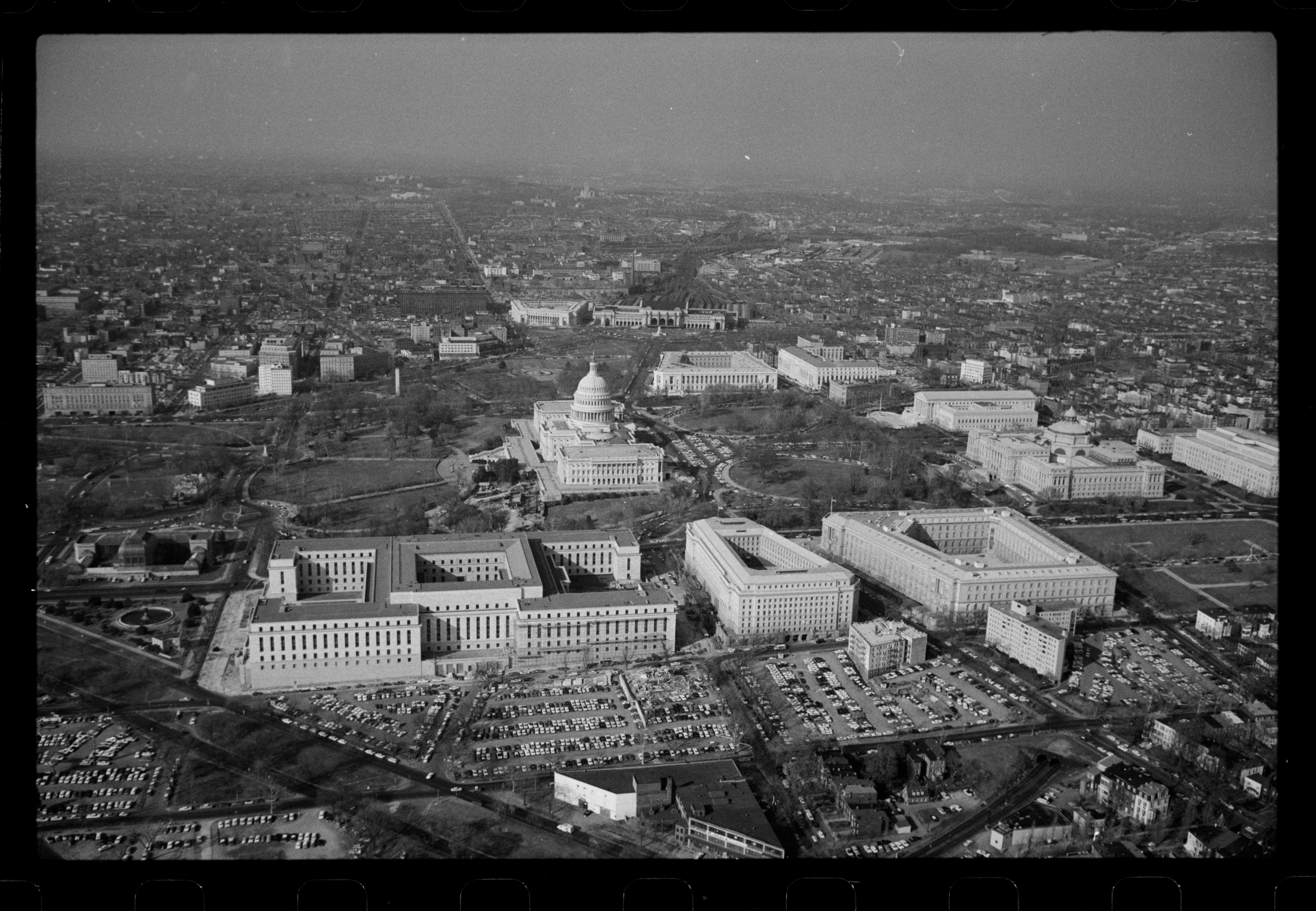
Aerial view of the U.S. Capitol complex in 1964. The O'Neill House Office Building is the caret shaped building in the lower righthand side of the photograph, immediately below the Cannon House Office Building.

The O'Neill House Office Building was a congressional office building located near the United States Capitol at 301 C Street SE in Washington, D.C. Initially known as House Office Building Annex No. 1, it was named after former Speaker of the House Thomas "Tip" O'Neill in 1990.

The building was originally constructed as a hotel in 1947 and operated as the Hotel Congressional, with furnished apartments rented by the month, plus meeting rooms and restaurants. Congress acquired the building in 1957 and leased it back to the hotelier. The Leadership Conference on Civil Rights coordinated lobbying efforts for passage of the Civil Rights Act of 1964 from Room 410 of the hotel. In 1972, it was turned into an office building and renamed House Office Building Annex No. 1. House Judiciary Committee staffers worked out of the building during the Watergate investigation. From 1983 to 2001, the third and fourth floors of the building were residences for the dormitory for House Pages. The building was declared structurally unsound and demolished in 2002. A parking lot is currently on the site.
