= Hinckley Institute of Politics =

Institute of the University of Utah

- Founder: Robert H. Hinckley
- Established: 1965
- Mission: To engage students in transformative experiences and provide political thought leadership
- Focus: Involving students in practical politics and in governmental, civic and political processes
- Director: Jason Perry
- Location: Salt Lake City, Utah, United States
- Coordinates: 40°45′48″N 111°50′40″W
- Interactive map of Hinckley Institute of Politics
- Website: Official website

The Hinckley Institute of Politics is a nonpartisan extracurricular program located on the University of Utah campus in Salt Lake City, Utah. Its purpose is "to engage students in transformative experiences and provide political thought leadership" through involving students in practical politics and in governmental, civic and political processes.

Known for its internship program which has sent thousands of students to local, national, and global internship opportunities, the Hinckley Institute also provides educational programs for students, public school teachers and the general public.

== History ==
The Hinckley Institute was founded by Robert H. Hinckley in 1965 as a way to engage students in government and "encourage the youngest and best minds to enter into politics." Since that time, the Hinckley Institute has helped to provide more than 7,000 students with internships opportunities. Students have been placed with various organizations, such as public offices, elected officials, non-government organizations, for-profit corporations, political campaigns, and non-profits.

In addition to internships, the Hinckley Institute offers publicly available political forums, scholarships, classes, excursions to Washington, D.C., and a campaign management minor.

== Leadership ==
Since its founding in 1965, the Hinckley Institute has been led by five directors. Jason Perry is the director of the institute, as of 2016, and Morgan Lyon Cotti is the associate director.

- J.D. Williams, Ph.D. – 1965–1975
- R.J. Snow, Ph.D. – 1975–1985
- Ted Wilson, M.Ed. – 1985–2003
- Kirk Jowers, J.D. – 2005–2015
- Jason Perry, J.D. – 2016–present

== Internships ==
The Hinckley Institute has provided University of Utah students with internship opportunities since 1966 and currently sends around 350 students every year to local, legislative, national, and global internships.

=== Local ===
The Hinckley Institute sends approximately 150 students each year to the most prestigious organizations in the Salt Lake City area. Students must register for at least three hours of course credit to participate. HNKLY classes are subject to standard tuition rates. Students can calculate their tuition costs here. Internships are available all semesters and open to students of all majors. Hinckley interns who have worked in local internships have done things like: serve as campaign managers, scheduling coordinators, and volunteer supervisors for races in Utah and have worked in local offices for U.S. senators and representatives, mayors, the Utah lieutenant governor’s office, the attorney general's office and the Chamber of Commerce. They have also worked in a number of non-profit organizations such as the American Cancer Society and the Utah Disability Law Center.

=== Legislative ===
Hinckley Interns function as support staff to aid legislators during the spring semester of each year. An intern may be asked to track legislation, write speeches, attend committee meetings, research issues, and analyze bills. Hinckley interns at the Utah State Legislature must adapt to a rigorous work schedule, take initiative in planning and organizing, and develop an effective working relationship with legislators. The Utah State Legislature Internship program offers students unparalleled access to the Utah legislative process. Interns serve as full-time staff to legislators, lobbyists, and the media during the 45-day legislative session that begin in late January and work on a part-time basis in the weeks preceding the start of the session. Legislative interns are not able to take other classes during this session due to the full-time work schedule. Each legislative intern up to $4,000 by the Office of Legislative Research and General Counsel. State legislative interns represent the University of Utah and the Hinckley Institute of Politics, and therefore, the highest conduct is expected.

=== Washington, D.C. ===
The Hinckley Institute of Politics has sent interns to Washington, D.C., since 1965, providing more than 100 students annually with full-time, paid internships in a variety of government institutions, public advocacy groups, and media/consulting firms. Hinckley interns are provided internship scholarships to cover expenses (if internship is unpaid), subsidized housing in central DC apartments, and up to 12 hours of academic credit.

These interns work for members of the Utah delegation on Capitol Hill, the U.S. Supreme Court, and major think tanks that affect American national policy. Offices that have hosted Hinckley interns include the Department of Health and Human Services, the Democratic National Committee, the Republican National Committee, the House Committee on International Relations, and the White House. Students shadow legislators, congressmen and senators as well as learn the methods of lobbying, media coverage, and communication within the U.S. national government.

==== Notable National Internship Opportunities ====
In 2008 the Hinckley Institute of Politics teamed up with the Li Ka-shing Foundation in Hong Kong, China to send five students from the University of Utah and seven students from Shantou University in Shantou, China to work as student journalists during the 2008 presidential election. The students were led by Frank Folwell, former photography editor of USA Today and his wife Sherry Riccardi. The students attended both the Democratic and Republican Conventions. From there they traveled to Washington, D.C., where they established their headquarters in the offices of Policy Impact, a lobbying and public relations organization under the leadership of William Nixon (a Fellow of the Hinckley Institute of Politics).

=== Global ===
The Hinckley Institute runs the University of Utah's Global Internship Program for all University of Utah students. The program has grown into what is considered in U.S. academia one of the most comprehensive and prestigious international internship programs. Global internships are available for undergraduate and graduate students of all disciplines in more than 50 countries. Academic credit and funding are available for fall, spring, and summer semesters. The goal of the Hinckley Institute's global internship program is to provide students with full-time, global work, cultural immersion, and career development opportunities.

Examples of internships include working with the Scottish or Australian parliament, doing humanitarian work in South America and Africa, and teaching women and children in India about AIDS prevention.

== Political forums ==
The Hinckley Institute facilitates political forums during the academic school year, offering students the opportunity to hear from leading local, national, and global experts and opinion leaders, on topics ranging from local and municipal government and elections, resource management, environmental sustainment, housing, employment and education policies, national and international issues such as human rights, health care, constitutional law, the rights of women and minorities, the effects of the media, international relations and policies pertaining to the Middle East, Europe, South America and Asia, and the effects that U.S. national policy has on international events, terrorism and the economy.

The Hinckley Institute has hosted such notable guests as:

- Bill Clinton, 42nd president of the United States
- Malcolm Gladwell, Canadian author and journalist
- Lee H. Hamilton, vice chair of the 9/11 Commission, co-chair of the Iraq Study Group and president and founder of the Woodrow Wilson International Center for Scholars
- Thomas E. Mann, congressional scholar and senior fellow of the Brookings Institution
- Orrin Hatch, U.S. senator (R-UT)
- Bob Bennett, U.S. senator (R-UT)
- Michael Leavitt, Secretary of Health and Human Services
- Jim Matheson, U.S. congressman (D-UT)
- John McCain, U.S. senator (R-AZ) and former presidential nominee
- Mitt Romney, American businessman and politician
- Karl Rove, former Deputy Chief of Staff to President George W. Bush
- Harry Reid, U.S. Senate Majority Leader
- Brent Scowcroft, United States National Security Advisor
- Robert Redford, actor and political activist

== Scholarships ==
The Hinckley Institute offers several scholarships to University of Utah students who have exhibited outstanding academic performance, civic engagement and service to their local community. Scholarships are available as general academic scholarships and internship-specific scholarships. Loans are also available to students through the Hinckley Institute of Politics.

== Courses ==
As part of the Hinckley Institute's mission to engage students in practical politics, the Hinckley Institute offers several courses on campaign management, the U.S. presidency and money’s influence in government. Students may receive credit for attending political forums, in addition to increasing their awareness of current local, national, and global events.

== Capital Encounter ==
Each semester, University of Utah students are provided with the opportunity to visit Washington, D.C., with one of the University of Utah's political science professors and the Hinckley Institute's program director over national internships. During Capital Encounter, students experience DC and the politics that surround it by visiting places and offices like Washington's national monuments and memorials, meeting with members of the Utah delegation, touring the U.S. Supreme Court, and visiting the headquarters of the CIA. In this one week excursion, students study the functions and inter-workings of the Executive, Legislative and Judicial branches of government, and are given the opportunity to meet with members of the president's cabinet and discuss current events with top government officials.
