= Page of the United States House of Representatives =

United States political program

The United States House of Representatives Page Program was a program run by the United States House of Representatives, under the office of the Clerk of the House, in which high school students acted as non-partisan federal employees in the House of Representatives, providing supplemental administrative support to House operations in a variety of capacities in Washington, D.C., at the United States Capitol. Pages served within the House of Representatives for over 180 years. The program ended in 2011, although the Senate Page program has continued.

== Program history ==
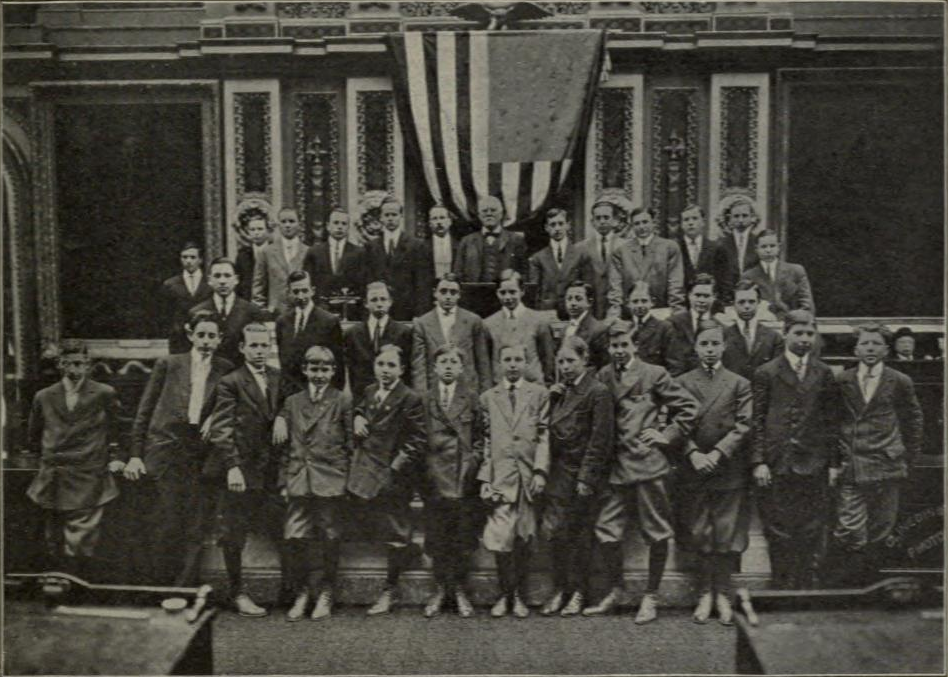
Pages in the House of Representatives at the National Capitol, 1910

As early as 1827, males were hired to serve as messengers in Congress. In the Congressional Record (formerly known as the Congressional Globe), the term "page" was first used in 1839 and referred to as a youth employed as a personal attendant to a person of high rank. However, some sources claim that pages have served as messengers since the very first Congress in 1789. The practice of using pages as a messaging service stemmed out of a tradition that dated back to the Middle Ages.

The first African-American page, Alfred Q. Powell, was appointed in 1871 by Charles H. Porter (R-VA), with recommendations from William Henry Harrison Stowell (R-VA) and James H. Platt Jr. (R-VA).

In 1965, Paul Findley (R-IL) appointed Frank Mitchell as the second African-American page to serve in the House of Representatives. In 1973, House Speaker Carl Albert (D-OK) appointed Felda Looper as the first female page in the House of Representatives.

Following a scandal in 1983, the Page Residence Hall was established and located on the House side (the south side) of the Capitol, near the Rayburn House Office Building and the House and Congress required that all pages be at least 16 years old and juniors in high school. Previous to that, the age range of pages was lower at 14 to 18 and no type of housing was provided.

=== 1954 Puerto Rican Nationalist shooting ===
On March 1, 1954, members of the Puerto Rican Nationalist Party opened gunfire from the observation gallery on the House chamber during debate, injuring five members of the House of Congress. In this U.S. Capitol shooting incident Congressman Alvin Morell Bentley (R-MI) was seriously wounded by a bullet fired by Lolita Lebrón. Six pages carried Congressman Bentley off the House floor. The famous photograph of pages carrying Congressman Bentley could be found in the Page Residence Hall as well as the Republican Cloakroom and Page School. Two of the pages in the picture later became members of Congress: Paul Kanjorski (D-PA) and Bill Emerson (R-MO), for whom the main assembly hall in the Page School was named. A bullet hole from the attack can still be found directly above what was the Democratic page desk.

=== Scandals ===
==== 1983 sex and drug scandal ====
In 1983, Representatives Dan Crane (R-IL) and Gerry Studds (D-MA) were revealed to have engaged in sexual relationships with 17-year-old congressional pages. In Crane's case, it was a 1980 relationship with a female page; in Studds's case, it was a 1973 relationship with a male page. Because Washington, D.C.'s age of consent is 16, no crimes were committed. The House Ethics Committee reprimanded both on July 14, 1983. However, Representative Newt Gingrich of Georgia (future Speaker of the House by 1995), demanded the expulsion of both Representatives. On July 20, the House voted for censure, the first time in congressional history that censure had been imposed for sexual misconduct. Representative Crane tearfully apologized for his transgression and lost his bid for reelection in 1984. Congressman Studds refused to apologize, and he continued to be reelected until his retirement 14 years later in 1997.

The House of Representatives Ethics Committee probe found that James Howarth, who had supervised the House chamber's pages until December 1982, when he was given other duties, had had sex himself in 1980 with one of his 17-year-old female wards. The report also accused Howarth of buying cocaine in the House's Democratic cloakroom, possibly from another House staffer. He resigned on November 15, 1983, prior to formal House action. The Majority Assistant Cloakroom Manager Robert Yesh, who was accused of selling and using cocaine and using marijuana and cocaine with House pages, and pleaded guilty to two federal misdemeanors on March 9, 1983, resigned on April 15, 1983. An employee in the House of Representatives Doorkeeper's office, James Beattie, was accused of selling and using cocaine, resigned on May 16, 1983, and pleaded guilty to two federal crimes of misdemeanors on July 28, 1983.

==== 1996 alcohol scandal ====
In 1996, five pages of the House of Representatives were dismissed for alcohol use.

==== 2002 marijuana dismissals ====
In 2002, 11 House pages were dismissed for using marijuana. The incident occurred after a female page who had family in the Washington, D.C., area invited fellow pages to her home, where marijuana was used while the teenagers were unsupervised. That page later brought other drugs to the House pages dormitory and this was reported to authorities.

==== 2006 Mark Foley scandal ====
The Mark Foley scandal involved the former Republican U.S. Representative Mark Foley of Florida, who sent e-mails and instant messages of a sexual nature to several former congressional House pages. Page Board Chairman John Shimkus said "that in late 2005 he learned — through information passed along by Rodney Alexander's office — about an e-mail exchange in which Foley asked about the youngster's well-being after Hurricane Katrina (August 2005), and requested a photograph."

After this revelation, other congressional House pages came forward with similar stories about Congressman Foley. Graphic conversations between Foley and several pages using the internet computer messaging system AOL Instant Messenger were released by TV network ABC News on September 29, 2006; Foley then resigned that same day. United States Secretary of Transportation Ray LaHood (Republican-Illinois) later suggested suspending the program.

Rep. Sue Kelly, who was Chairwoman of the Page Board from 1998 to 2001, was caught up in the scandal when three pages said she was aware of Representative Foley's inappropriate attention toward pages during her tenure.

=== House Page Board ===
The House of Representatives Page Board was created in response to the 1983 scandal. It originally consisted of two members of the majority party, one member of the minority party, and several officers of the House. In reaction to the later Mark Foley scandal of 2006, the composition of the board changed. It then consisted of two members of the majority party, two (adding one) members of the minority party, the House of Representatives officials of the Sergeant at Arms, the Clerk of the House, and added the parent of a former page, and a former page. These changes were implemented as part of the House of Representatives Page Board Revision Act of 2007. (Pub. L. 110–2 (text) (PDF), 121 Stat. 4, enacted February 2, 2007). Chairpersons of the Board included Sue W. Kelly (R-NY) (1998–2001), John Shimkus (R-IL) (2001–2006), and Dale Kildee (D-MI) (2007 – 2011).

=== End of the program ===
On August 8, 2011, Speaker John Boehner (R-OH) and then-Minority Leader Nancy Pelosi (D-CA) announced in a joint statement that the House of Representatives would end the longtime page program, saying technological advancements made page services unnecessary in light of the cost of the program, which was more than $5 million ($69,000-$80,000 per page). "Pages, once stretched to the limit delivering large numbers of documents and other packages between the U.S. Capitol and southside House office buildings, are today rarely called upon for such services, since most documents are now transmitted electronically", they said. "We have great appreciation for the unique role that pages have played in the history and traditions of the House of Representatives. This decision was not easy, but it was necessary due to the prohibitive cost of the program and advances in technology that have rendered most page-provided services no longer essential to the smooth functioning of the House."

The separate U.S. Senate Page program since 1829, however continued.

== Selection ==
In the modern era, pages were nominated by representatives based upon a highly competitive application process. Pages served during the spring and fall semesters of their junior year, as well as during summer sessions before or after their junior year. Prospective House pages were nominated by a representative or congressional delegate (pages have come from all 50 U.S. states as well as the District of Columbia, Puerto Rico, Guam, U.S. Virgin Islands, and American Samoa). It was a general rule that only one nominee was permitted per representative, except for party leadership. Each group of pages, typically referred to as a "class", typically consisted of between 45 and 75 students, with the summer sessions being larger.

== Page life ==
=== Work ===
The page's work life revolved around the United States Capitol in the federal capital city of Washington, D.C. Officially a division (and operating under the authority and supervision) of the Office of the Clerk of the United States House of Representatives, the Page Program since 1827 / 1839, existed primarily to provide supplement support to various House of Representatives offices. Two full-time, adult employees of the Office of the Clerk served as "chief pages" (commonly referred to as work bosses), although some holders of this position self-titled themselves as "page supervisors" to avoid misidentification. These employees were not partisan, although there was one Republican Supervisor and one Democratic Supervisor to direct the day-to-day operations of the page groups and provide front-line adult supervision. Additionally, the Office of the Clerk employed a page coordinator to coordinate all aspects of page life, school, work, and dormitory and handle administrative responsibilities.

Page responsibilities included taking statements from members of Congress after speeches (for the legislative journal, the Congressional Record), printing and delivering vote reports to various offices, tending members' personal needs while on the floor of the House chamber, managing phones in the adjacent cloakrooms for the party caucases, and ringing the Capitol bells for upcoming votes.

For work purposes, pages were divided into two groups, Republican and Democratic, based upon the party affiliation of their sponsoring Member. On both sides of the aisle, the vast majority of pages were based on the Floor of the House and serve as runners. These runners were dispatched to various House offices, typically taking advantage of the underground United States Capitol subway system to transport various documents by overseer or desk pages. The overseer pages were responsible for ensuring that all inbound call requests were met as quickly as possible and that the workload was distributed as evenly as possible among the runners. A fair number of dispatches involve the runners going to Congressional offices to bring proposed legislation to the cloakrooms. At the cloakrooms, a cloakroom page, or a cloakroom manager would sign for receipt of the legislation. It was then brought to the bill hopper, or simply, the hopper (a repository box on the rostrum on the Floor) for official submission to the Clerk of the House.

Pages also delivered correspondence to and from the respective Cloakrooms as well as offices in the surrounding Capitol complex. Pages also distributed American flags that were to be flown over the Capitol, for distribution / presentation to constituents, visitors and guests.

Speaker's pages served solely to the Office of the Speaker of the House, conducting tasks that ranged from fetching beverages and snacks for the Speaker and his or her official guests to helping to compose internal memoranda. The assignment of Speaker's pages was suspended in September 2007.

Documentarian pages, or "docs," were selected from the group of pages in the majority party and were perhaps the two most visible pages. Seated to the stage-left of the rostrum, these pages had several important responsibilities. When the House gaveled into session, the documentarians were responsible for raising the U.S. flag on the roof of the House of Representatives south wing of the Capitol, officially notifying the public that the House was in session. At the close of the day, when the House adjourned, they returned to the roof and lowered the flag. Additionally, they were responsible for activating the bell system which rang throughout the House of Representatives south side of the United States Capitol Complex (including the Capitol itself, the tunnel passageways and adjacent several House Office Buildings) notifying Representatives that the House was in session or that there was an upcoming vote. Also, they provided assistance to the various other staff, clerks and congressional parliamentarians seated at the front rostrum, as well as the Speaker Pro Tempore. Although highly independent, these pages fell under the de facto supervision of the Timekeeper (Clerk to the Parliamentarian). Docs worked in pairs, until the House adjourned. They were present during the period of Special Orders, a time when a member may speak for one hour on any subject (in view of the overhead recently installed television recording video cameras), which were conducted after the day's legislative business ended.

Each party's cloakroom had assigned cloakroom pages, or "cloakies," who provide direct assistance to Members of the House / Congress when on the floor and assisted the cloakroom staff. Cloakroom pages answered the cloakrooms' phones and transfer the calls to the booths in the cloakroom. When a congressional staffer wanted to talk with a member, cloakroom pages went on the floor and notified that member. These pages also conveyed messages between individual representatives. Additionally, cloakroom pages helped maintain official cloakroom records of daily proceedings, including bills before the House for debate and votes. Miscellaneous tasks included cleaning the phone booths provided in the cloakroom; assisting the cloakroom managers in answering phone calls; during votes, waking up representatives who were napping / asleep; and making sure that every member present remembered to vote. These pages fell under the de facto supervision of the managers of the respective party caucus cloakrooms.

=== Uniform ===
House pages wore uniforms consisting of a navy blue blazer jacket, white dress shirt, necktie, lapel pin, name-tag, gray slacks for boys and gray skirts or slacks for girls, and black shoes. Until the early 1960s, boy pages were required to wear suits (with dress shirt and necktie), with knickers as shortened pants, with long socks, considered very old-fashioned long after the clothing style had become obsolete since the 1930s.

=== School ===
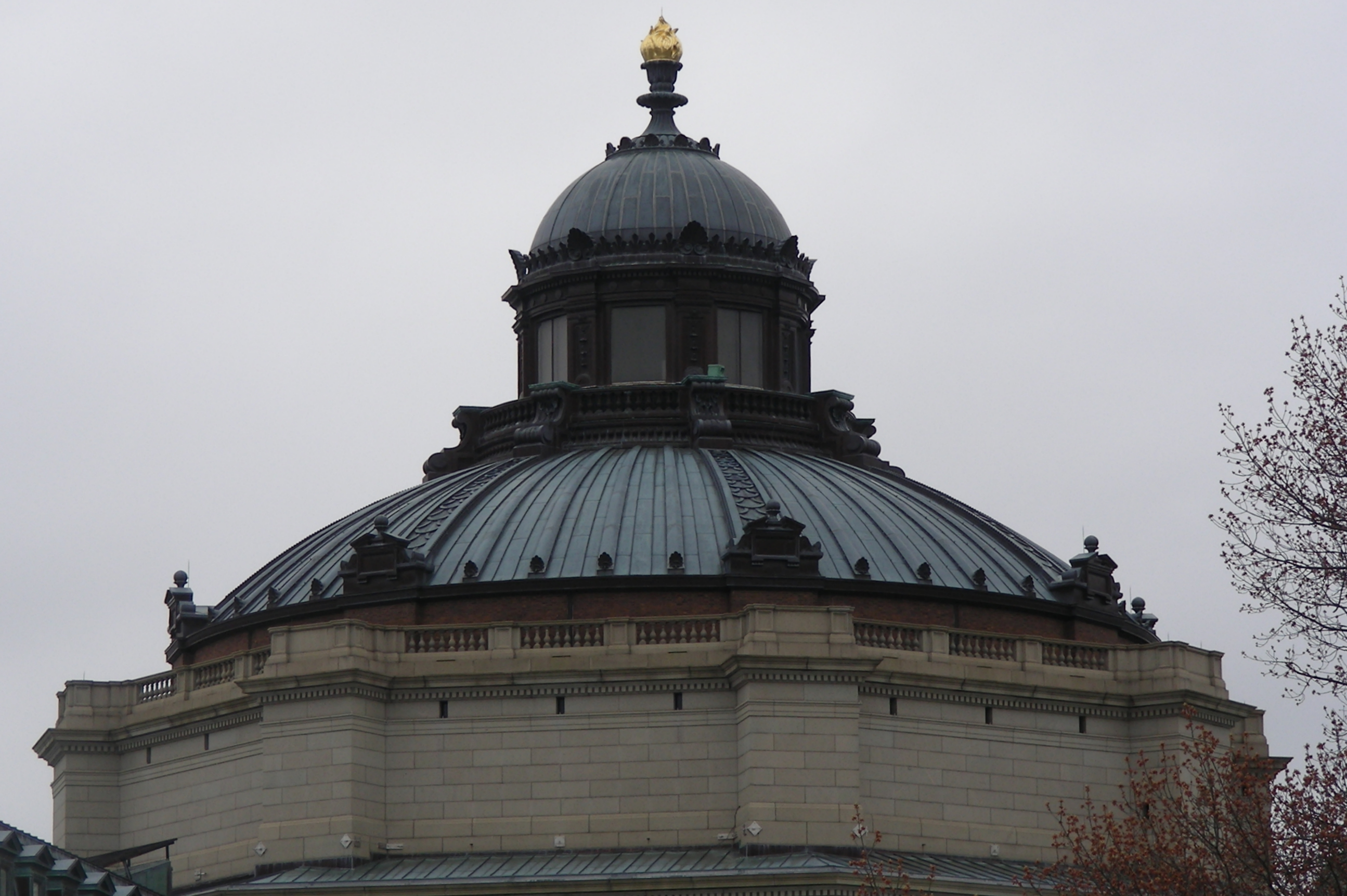
Top level cupola of the original Thomas Jefferson Building of the Library of Congress, built 1890-1897, situated to the east across First Street from East Front of the United States Capitol, Washington, D.C.

Pages serving during the school year attended the House of Representatives Page School, located on the attic / top floor of the original 1890-1897 Thomas Jefferson Building of the Library of Congress. The school was accredited by the regional academic agency Middle States Association of Colleges and Secondary Schools. Pages attended high school here from 6:45 to 10:00 a.m. The only exception was for pages who worked past 10 p.m. the evening prior.

=== Housing ===
Prior to 1983, House pages resided at various locations around the federal capital city of the District of Columbia. Beginning in 1983 to 2001, pages resided at the now-demolished old / first O'Neill House Office Building of 1947, at 301 C Street S.E., Washington, D.C. 20003 (also formerly known as House Annex One). In preparation for that building's demolition, pages resided in a former dormitory / convent for Roman Catholic Church nuns working at nearby Providence Hospital. From 2001 until the end of the program in 2011, House of Representatives pages resided at the Page Residence Hall (PRH) at 501 First Street S.E., Washington, D.C. 20003.

== Notable pages of the U.S. House of Representatives ==
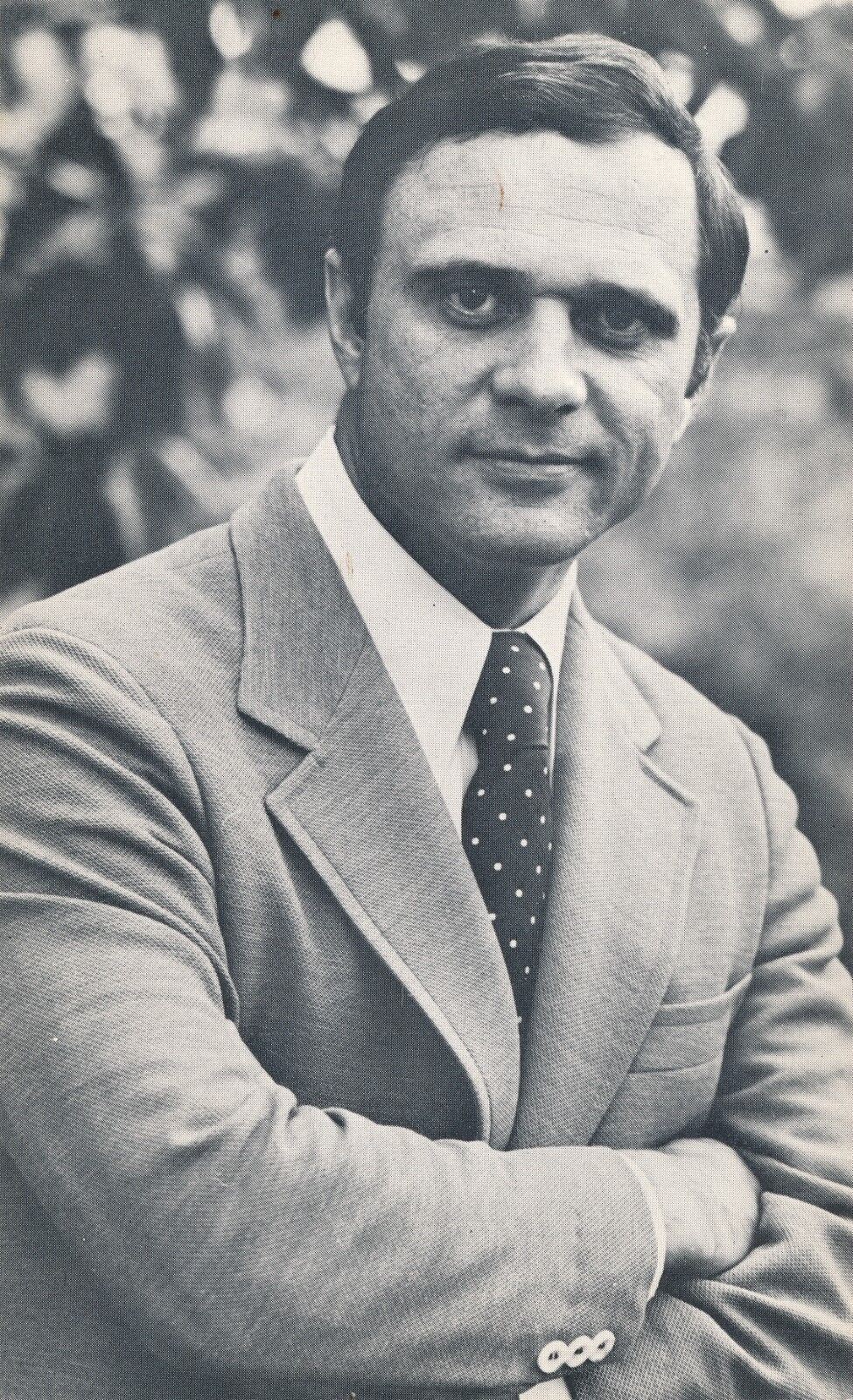
David Pryor

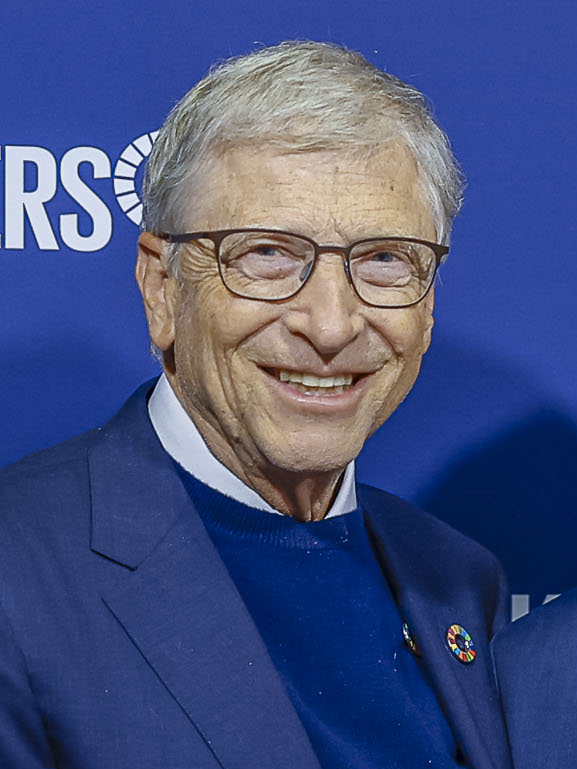
Bill Gates

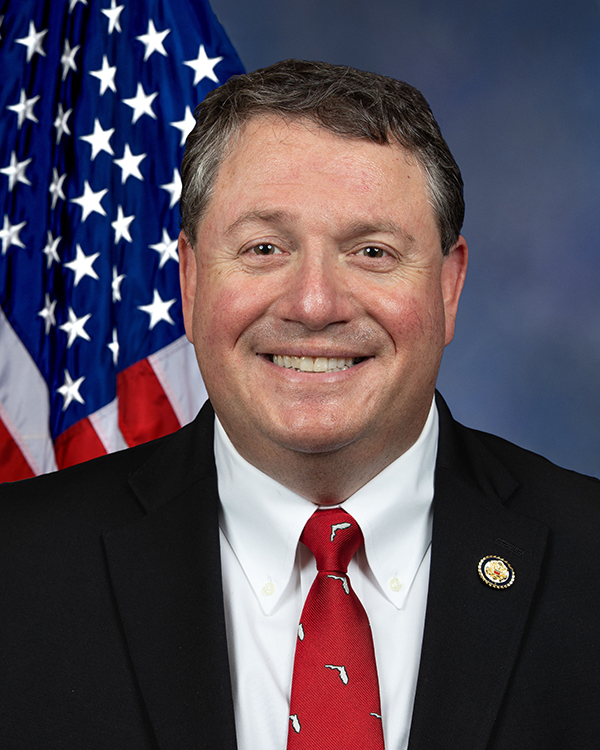
Randy Fine

- William Lawrence Scott - 1840–46 (politician and businessman)
- Gilbert M. Woodward - (U.S. Representative)
- Richard W. Townshend (U.S. Representative)
- William B. Cushing - 1856 (naval hero of the American Civil War)
- John E. Pillsbury - 1861–62 (naval commander and geographer)
- John Dingell - 1938–41 (U.S. Representative)
- Charles Bennett (U.S. Representative)
- Brad Dye - 1950 (Lieutenant Governor of Mississippi)
- David Pryor - 1951 (U.S. Senator and Representative)
- Donald F. Munson - 1953 (Maryland State Senator)
- Paul E. Kanjorski - 1953–55 (U.S. Representative)
- Robert Bauman - 1953–55 (U.S. Representative)
- Bill Emerson - 1953–55 (U.S. Representative)
- Jed Johnson Jr. - ?–1957 (U.S. Representative)
- Ander Crenshaw - June 1961 (U.S. Representative)
- Douglas Bosco - ?–1963 (U.S. Representative)
- Rush Holt Jr. - Summers 1963 & 1964 (U.S. Representative)
- Thomas M. Davis - 1963–67 (U.S. Representative)
- Richard Armstrong - (Guggenheim Museum director)
- Andrew Napolitano - 1966 (New Jersey Superior Court judge; contributor to Fox News)
- Bill Owens - (Governor of Colorado)
- Roger Wicker - 1967 (U.S. Representative and Senator)
- Bill Gates - Summer 1972 (Founder/CEO of Microsoft)
- David Beasley - (Governor of South Carolina; Executive Director of the World Food Programme)
- Maura Connelly - 1975–77 (diplomat)
- R. Donahue Peebles - 1976–78 (entrepreneur)
- Jonathan Turley - 1977–78 (law professor, legal commentator, litigator)
- Jamie Dupree - 1980 (broadcaster)
- Dave Hunt - 1985 (Oregon House Speaker)
- Dan Boren - Summer 1989 (U.S. Representative)
- Randy Fine - 1990–91 (Member of the Florida House of Representatives, the Florida Senate, and the U.S. House of Representatives)
- Seth Andrew - 1994–95 (educator)
- Abby Finkenauer - 2006 (U.S. Representative)

== See also ==
- Page of the United States Senate
- Canadian House of Commons Page Program
- Canadian Senate Page Program
