= Robert H. Hinckley =

American politician (1891–1988)

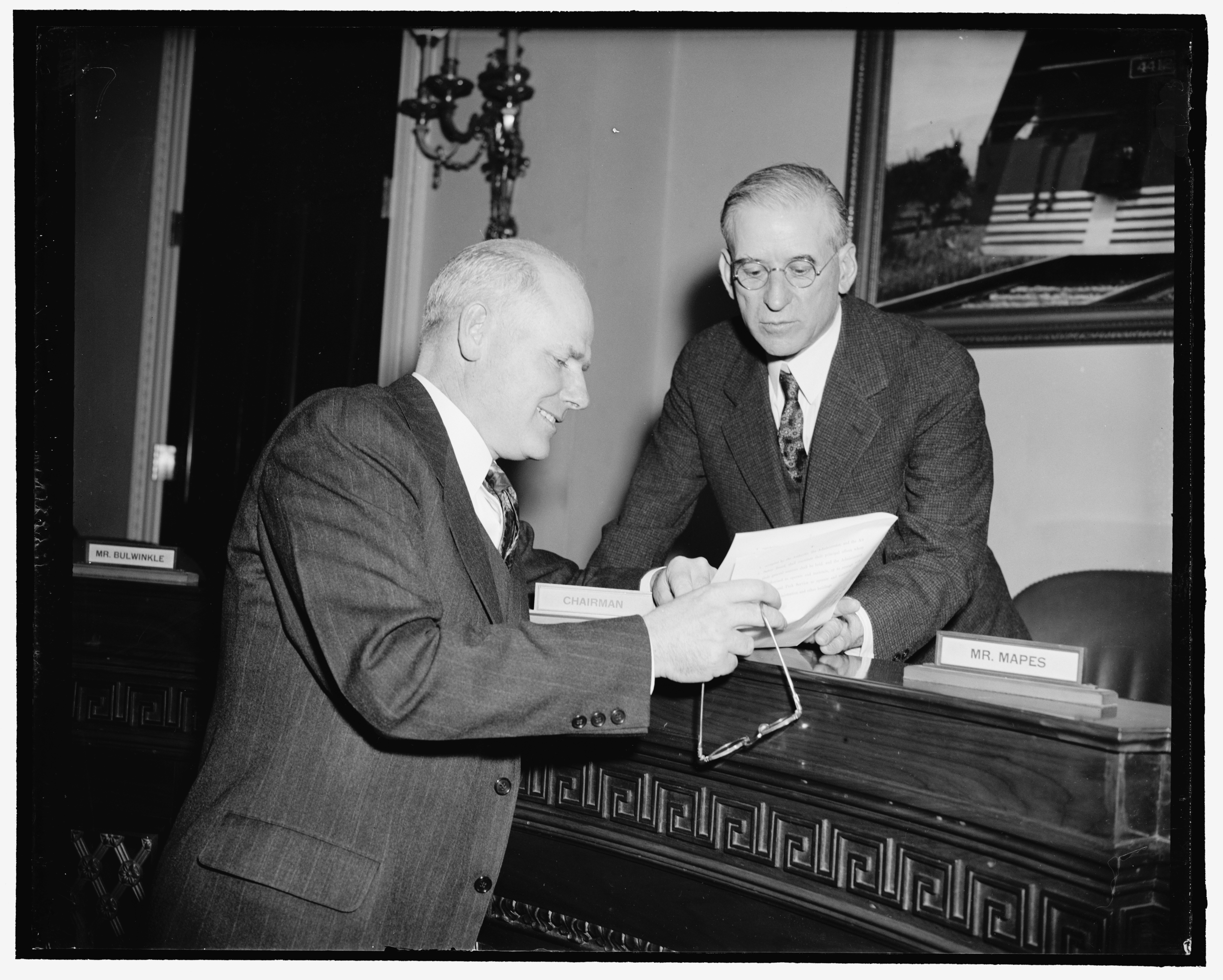
Robert Hinckley (left) with Clarence F. Lea in March 1939

Robert H. Hinckley (June 8, 1891 – 1988) was involved in aviation and politics. He founded the Hinckley Institute of Politics at the University of Utah.

== Early life and education ==
Hinckley was the son of Edwin S. Hinckley and Adeline Henry. For some of his earliest years Hinckley lived in Ann Arbor while his father pursued his education at the University of Michigan.

During most of his youth, Hinckley lived in Provo, Utah, where his father was a professor at Brigham Young University (BYU). He graduated from Brigham Young High School, the high school affiliate of BYU, in 1910. Hinckley then served a mission for the Church of Jesus Christ of Latter-day Saints in Germany.

Hinckley first flew in 1913 with Melli Beese in Berlin, Germany, about the time of the end of Hinckley's LDS mission. After his mission, Hinckley continued his studies at BYU receiving a bachelor's degree in 1916. In June 1915, Hinckley married Abrelia Clarissa Seely.

== Career ==
After his graduation from BYU in 1916, Hinckley joined the faculty of North Sanpete High School in Mount Pleasant, Utah. He also formed the Seely-Hinckley Automobile Company, a car dealership, with some of his in-laws.

Hinckley, a lifelong Democrat, entered politics with his election as a member of the Utah State Legislature from Sanpete County in 1918. He also served as mayor of Mount Pleasant, Utah beginning in 1923.

In 1927, he moved to Ogden, Utah. Here he founded the car dealership Robert H. Hinckley Dodge, Inc. He was also one of the organizers of Utah-Pacific Airways, which, among other things, pioneered air support in fighting forest fires.

In 1931, Hinckley was appointed to a government advisory committee on relief. In 1933 he was appointed the director of the Utah Emergency Relief program by governor Henry H. Blood. He later served as director of the Western Region for the Works Progress Administration.

In 1938, Hinckley was appointed to the Civil Aeronautics Authority by Franklin D. Roosevelt. The next year he was appointed head of this organization. While there Hinckley oversaw the building of the Washington National Airport and the formation of the Civilian Pilot Training Program. Hinckley also served as the assistant secretary of commerce in the Roosevelt administration.

In 1944, Hinckley was appointed as head of contract settlement to bring a fair and reasonable end to war contracts after the war. Subsequently, he worked with Edward J. Noble in founding the American Broadcasting Company.

Hinckley served many years on the board of trustees of the University of Utah. It was while there he worked to found the Hinckley Institute of Politics, including getting Noble and his foundation to put up a large part of the money for it.

In 1977, BYU Press published Hinckley's autobiography entitled I'd Rather Be Born Lucky Than Rich which was co-authored with JoAnn Jacobsen Wells.

In 1998 the Hinckley Institute published Bae B. Gardner's biography of Hinckley entitled Robert Henry Hinckley: Getting to Know Him.

The Hinckleys had three sons and one daughter.

Hinckley's son, Robert H. Hinckley Jr., studied at Stanford University and the United States Military Academy. He received the Distinguished Flying Cross for his service in the United States military during World War II. After he returned to Utah he helped run the family Dodge business and succeeded his father as director of the board for the Hinckley Institute.

Their son John Seely Hinckley (1923–1990) also worked in the automobile business. He graduated from the University of Utah after having served in the military during World War II. John was the president of the National Automobile Dealers Association in 1973. He also served as a member of the Ogden City Council.

== Sources ==
- Hinckley Institute of Politics page
- fact sheet on Hinckley
- Brigham Young High School alumni bio
- University of Utah Library archives bio
