= Bill hopper (furniture) =

Item used in the United States Congress

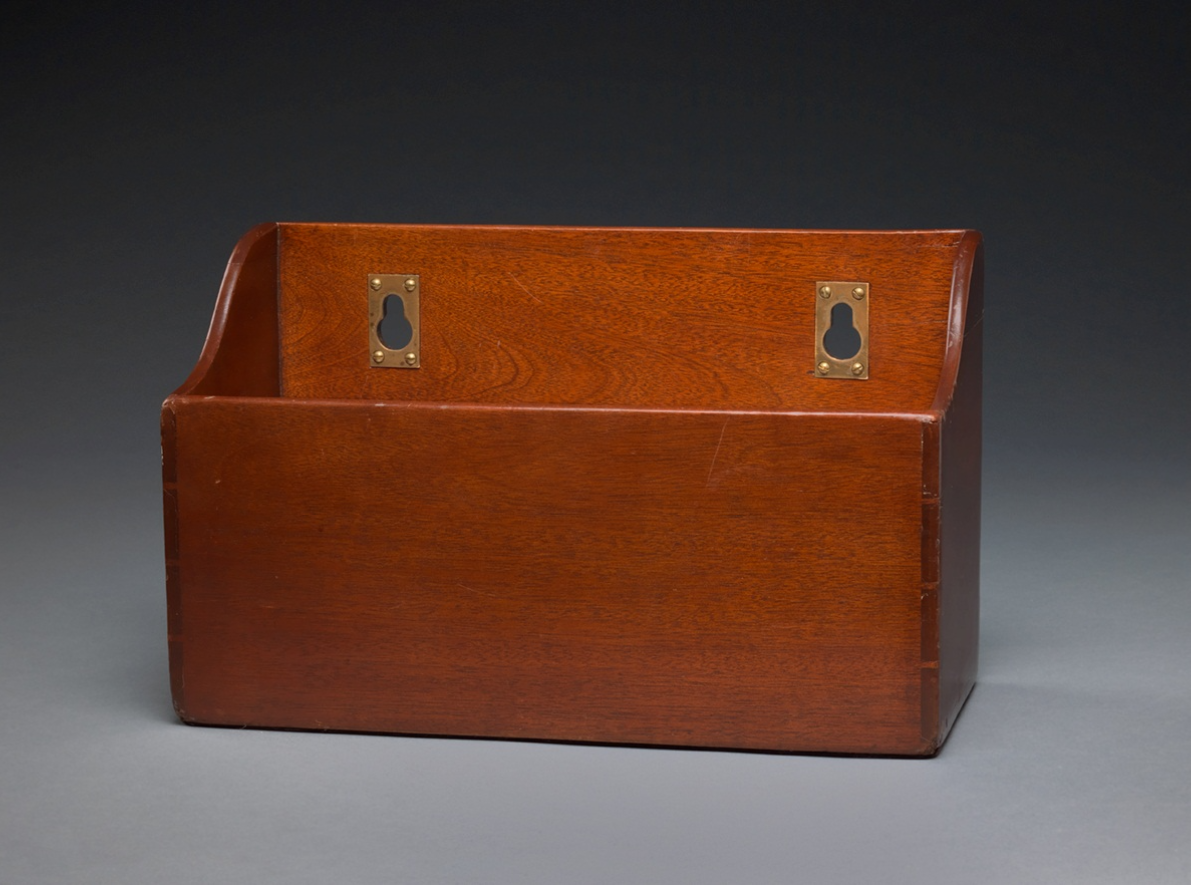
The U.S. House bill hopper

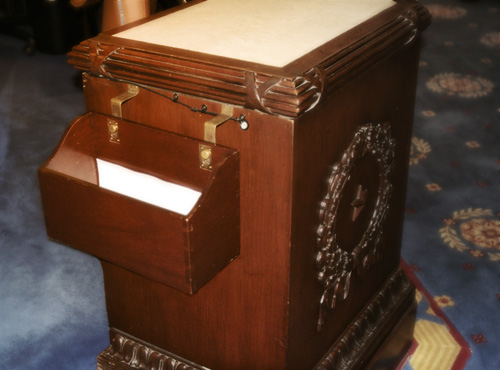
Bill hopper next to the Clerk's desk at the U.S. House Chamber

A bill hopper is a piece of furniture used for the receiving of bills in the United States House of Representatives. It was formerly used in the United States Senate.

Congressional representatives place bills in the hopper which are then collected by the clerk, numbered, and transferred from the hopper to appropriate congressional committees by the speaker.

== History ==
The term hopper is derived from funnel shaped storage bins that contained grain, coal, or animal feed. The movement of the grain as it poured into the storage bin has been likened to 'hopping' or dancing. The United States House of Representatives wrote that the "hopper represents the initial phase of a bill's journey toward refinement, or final passage, much like grain when processed into flour".

The hoppers are fed from the top and emptied from the bottom. The term became particularly prevalent within the agrarian society of the 19th and early 20th century United States. Many legislators came from agricultural backgrounds, and analogies were frequently drawn in speeches between the refinement of grain and the progression of bills. The Indiana representative John Hanna, said that "Let us have an end of tumbling every legislative grist into the appropriation hopper to be ground out by the use of burrs and ill-adapted and ill-adjusted to the purposes of general legislation". Francis G. Newlands of Nevada said in a 1900 speech concerning the Isthmian Canal Commission that "A certain amount of brute force is required in order to put this bill into the legislative hopper. When it comes out of the hopper in nine months hence, for it will take that time, we then hope it will be a perfected product".

The Congressional Record first specifically mentions the hopper in 1924 when the Texan representative Thomas Lindsay Blanton said that "Why, I learn that my good friend from Mississippi [Mr. Collier] has just this afternoon dropped into the hopper, where House bills are introduced, his bill to construct a $250,000 post-office building in Jackson, Miss." The device had previously been referred to as a 'basket'. In 1902 the Speaker of the United States House of Representatives David B. Henderson said that "The Chair desires to call the attention of members of the House to the fact that some members are inadvertently placing bills in the basket without noting their names on the bills, making it impossible for the Clerk to give due credit".

An original senate bill hopper dating from around 1817 is on display in the Old Senate Chamber. It is part of the collection of the Smithsonian Institution. The senate bill hopper had shelves as opposed to the 'bucket' shaped construction of the congressional hopper. The spaces between the shelves of the senate bill hopper shorten with height such that the top shelves are narrower than the bottom ones; it is believed that this is because so few bills became legally enacted. A congressional bill hopper dating from the early 1950s is in the art collection of the House of Representatives; it was retired in 2004. It was situated next to the desk of the Clerk of the House of Representatives in the Chamber of the House of Representatives.

== See also ==
- First reading, the initial stage of a bill in various legislatures
- Act of Parliament - First reading, the initial stage of a bill in the Westminster system
