= Daniel Webster Senate Page Residence =

Living quarters for US Senate Pages

Coordinates: 38°53′37.6″N 77°0′3.3″W

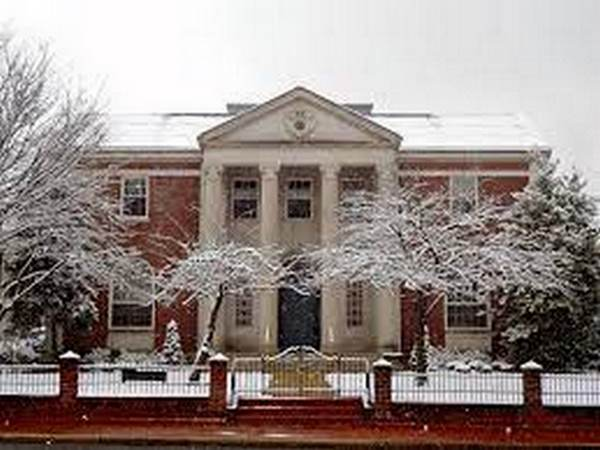
The Daniel Webster Senate Page Residence on Capitol Hill

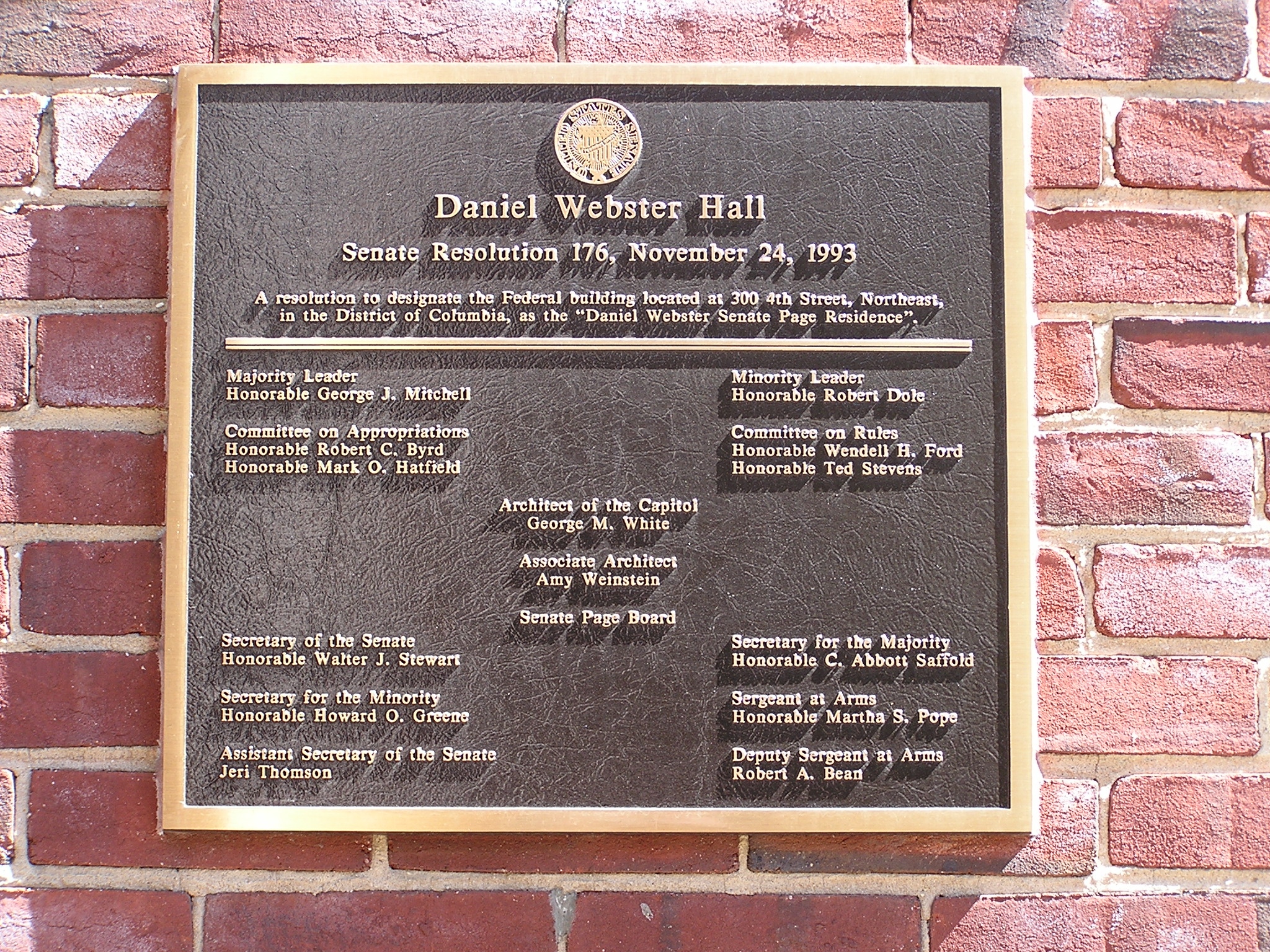
Plaque outside the Senate Page Residence

The Daniel Webster Senate Page Residence, also known as Webster Hall, is the residence for United States Senate Pages. The building is a former funeral home and underwent an $8 million refurbishment in 1995, converting it to its current state. It is located near the Hart Senate Office Building, giving pages the ability to walk to and from work. Pages are required to live in the building during the school year. The building has 24/7 protection by the United States Capitol Police both indoors and on foot around the building. The United States Senate Page School is located in the basement of the building. The residential portion of Webster Hall is staffed by adult employees of the United States Senate Page Program, while the school is staffed by employees of the United States Senate Page School. Pages are supervised by proctors, generally graduate students, who are employed by the United States Senate Page Program. $1,200 per month is deducted from a page's paycheck to fund room and board. In addition to the proctors, there is a program director and an administrative aide. There are two living quarters with one being designated for female students and the other for male students. There are laundry and kitchen facilities in the building. Along with the 24/7 protection by the United States Capitol Police, visitors are required to sign in and all individuals must present some form of identification. During summer sessions, pages may request arrangements for alternative housing.

== See also ==
- Daniel Webster, the residence is named for this statesman, congressman, senator, and Secretary of State
