= Canadian Senate Page Program =

National youth competition

The Canadian Senate Page Program (French: Programme des pages du Sénat) is a student internship program for the Senate of Canada. Each year, 15 undergraduate students are chosen through a national competition to work as a page for the Senate. Under the leadership of the Chief and Deputy Chief Page, pages are primarily responsible for assisting senators and table officers throughout sittings of the Senate by fulfilling various requests as well as those of various dignitaries, Supreme Court justices, the prime minister, and the governor general when visiting the Senate. Pages are responsible for numerous tasks in relation to chamber and committee duties, such as distribution of files and documents, relaying messages, and administrative and procedural duties. Pages attend to and assist with the proceedings of notable events such as royal assent, speech from the throne, and state visits. They also share their experiences with youth participating in various national outreach programs such as Forum for Young Canadians and Encounters With Canada, and work to improve the Senate Page Program itself. The Senate Page Program falls under the umbrella of responsibility of the Office of the Usher of the Black Rod.

== History ==
It is difficult to determine the origins of the Senate Page Program. The title "page" first started to appear in the Journals of Legislative Assembly of the Province of Canada in 1841. There are also reports indicating the presence of pages in legislatures as early as 1765 and 1827. It is certain, however, that by 1868 the position of page was a well established part of parliamentary life.

The basic requirement of a Senate page following confederation was "to be a smart little boy." There were several reasons why pages had to be little. To begin with, because there was no microphone system in the chamber, it could be difficult to hear the senators during their speeches. Therefore, it was essential to have short pages in order to avoid obstructing the sound. In addition, parliamentarians were concerned that taller pages might obscure their view during debate. Finally, the uniform was only available in one size, so pages had to be small enough to fit the uniform. Therefore, pages were usually forced to retire by the age of seventeen.

Initially, the Senate had only six pages. Following the First World War, priority was given to candidates who were young boys from needy families. The six pages were required to be present for every sitting of the Senate, but the sitting hours at the time did not conflict with school. As the work of the Senate expanded and its sitting hours tended to interfere with school, the decision was made to select university students as pages. This practice began in 1971 and the pages were required to organize their schedules around the sitting hours of the Senate.

Hiring female pages was not seen as an option until 1971 when senator Muriel Fergusson asked that there be consideration given to hiring women. She noted that the United States and the Ontario Legislature had already broken with tradition and hired female pages. Later that same year, speaker Deschatelets introduced the first two female pages in the Senate.

The responsibilities of the Senate pages have been expanded within the past few years. While initially only responsible for the chamber during the sittings, pages now assist senators in Senate committee meetings, and also work in the Senate administration when the Senate is not in session. These added tasks provide the pages with a broader understanding of the functions of the Senate. As the workload has increased, the size of the Senate Page Program has expanded, first to eight pages and then to fifteen in 1995.

Today, the Senate Page Program is made up of 15 young men and women from all over Canada. While many have moved on to other endeavors, several Senate pages have moved on to other positions in the Senate. These positions within the administration include Head of Senate Security and Clerk of the Senate.

== Selection process ==
A written examination and an interview will determine the candidates' competencies for the position of page (see "Rated Requirements" below). More details will be provided when the candidates are convened for the selection process.

Many factors are taken into consideration when making the final selection in establishing a pool of qualified candidates which is used to appoint candidates to the position of Senate page. These factors include the candidate's performance during the interview/letters of recommendation (including involvement in extracurricular and/or volunteering activities and achievements); provincial representation; linguistic duality; diversity; male/female ratio; and written test results. As well, the Senate may give priority, once the selection process is completed, to a qualified candidate who has demonstrated a personal need for financial assistance to further his or her education.

Basic requirements:
To be eligible for the Page Program, candidates must:

a) Be full-time students pursuing their first undergraduate degree in one of the four National Capital Region universities (Carleton University, Saint-Paul University, University of Ottawa and Université du Québec en Outaouais);
b) Not have previous experience as a page on Parliament Hill (such as experience in the Canadian House of Commons Page Program);
c) Be able to communicate orally, at the advanced level, in both official languages (English and French);
d) Be a Canadian citizen or a permanent resident.

Rated requirements:
An examination is designed to assess knowledge of the organization of the Senate and Canadian parliamentary procedures; knowledge of the standing operating procedures for a Senate page; and knowledge of current events

An interview will assess the ability to communicate effectively and orally in the official language of his or her choice; and effective interpersonal relationships, judgment, initiative, and reliability

== Duties ==
Preparation for sittings: Prior to each Senate sitting, pages are responsible for numerous tasks. Upon arrival pages distribute files, including bills, journals, order papers, debates of the Senate and House of Commons, to all senators and officers in the Senate chamber. Pages are also responsible for any special requests pertaining to the day's sitting. After finishing various other tasks, pages then place a glass of water on each senator's desk.

Sittings: Pages greet Senators as they enter the chamber. As the sitting begins pages take their designated stations that include:

- Parade: A member of the Senate Protective Service and the Usher of the Black Rod lead the procession, which includes two pages, into the chamber at the beginning of every sitting.
- Console: One page is designated to console and is responsible of controlling the microphones within the chamber. This page is also responsible for bringing documents to the Senate interpreters before each sitting.
- North and South Doors: Pages are designated at these positions to assist senators throughout the sitting by fulfilling their requests, opening doors, distributing documents, relaying messages, and so on. These pages are also responsible for ringing the bells, which announce the beginning and end of each sitting, as well as votes.
- Reading Room and Workstation: One page is designated to each position to facilitate the requests of senators and to keep these rooms tidy. These pages are a link between senators' offices and the chamber throughout the sitting.

Committees: Once described by Muriel McQueen Fergusson, the first woman speaker of the Senate, as "the heart and soul of the Senate," committees are at the core of Senate work. Pages play an important role in ensuring the smooth proceedings of the operation and facilitation of Senate committees. Pages greet witnesses and aid the clerk with document reproduction, distribution and management, and also attend to the needs of the Senators.

Notable events: Each parliamentary session begins with a speech from the throne to outline the government's agenda for that session of Parliament. All pages attend to and assist with the proceedings and are responsible for the regular chamber duties as well as assisting dignitaries, such as the Supreme Court justices, the prime minister and the governor general, as well as acting as Senate liaisons. At times when there is very important legislation or a matter of national interest to be examined it is necessary to hold a committee of the whole within the Senate chamber itself, to allow all senators the opportunity to participate. The tasks of the pages differ slightly but are relatively the same as a regular sitting.
Votes are a regular occurrence in the Senate. The duties of the page are to sound the bells to summon the senators and ensure that no one enters the chamber during the vote to disrupt the process.
The governor general not only appears in the Senate during the speech from the throne, but also during a royal assent. The royal assent is an official event by which a bill that has been passed through Parliament becomes law. The pages are assigned numerous duties besides their usual chamber duties.

Conferences and special events: Sometimes pages are requested to assist in other special events in the Senate. These may include provincial speakers conferences, Remembrance Day ceremonies, and the installation of a governor general. Their tasks vary depending on the event.

Outreach programs: Throughout the year, youth from all across Canada travel to Ottawa to participate in various youth programs. While in Ottawa, they gain a greater awareness of federal politics and are privileged with the opportunity to visit the Senate. Pages are often invited to greet student groups in the Senate chamber and to explain their role in the Senate of Canada. These outreach programs include Forum for Young Canadians and Encounters with Canada.

Program: Since the pages themselves are responsible for a wide variety of tasks within the program, a great deal of time is spent working together on various projects. These projects include publicity, advertising, alumni, and so on. While the pages work under the direction of the Usher of the Black Rod, they have the opportunity to coordinate the program and ensure its success.

== Remuneration and contract length ==
Senate pages are hired on a one-year contract with the possibility of renewal for a second year. They are remunerated with a salary of per annum $16,085. Pages also have the opportunity of remaining for a third year if chosen as chief or deputy chief page. The deputy chief page is remunerated $25,613. The chief page is remunerated $27,696. All pages receive a bonus of $1,200 upon the successful completion of their contract.

== See also ==
- Canadian House of Commons Page Program
- United States Senate Page
- United States House of Representatives Page
- Senate of Canada
