= Page of the United States Senate =

Student employee of the United States Senate

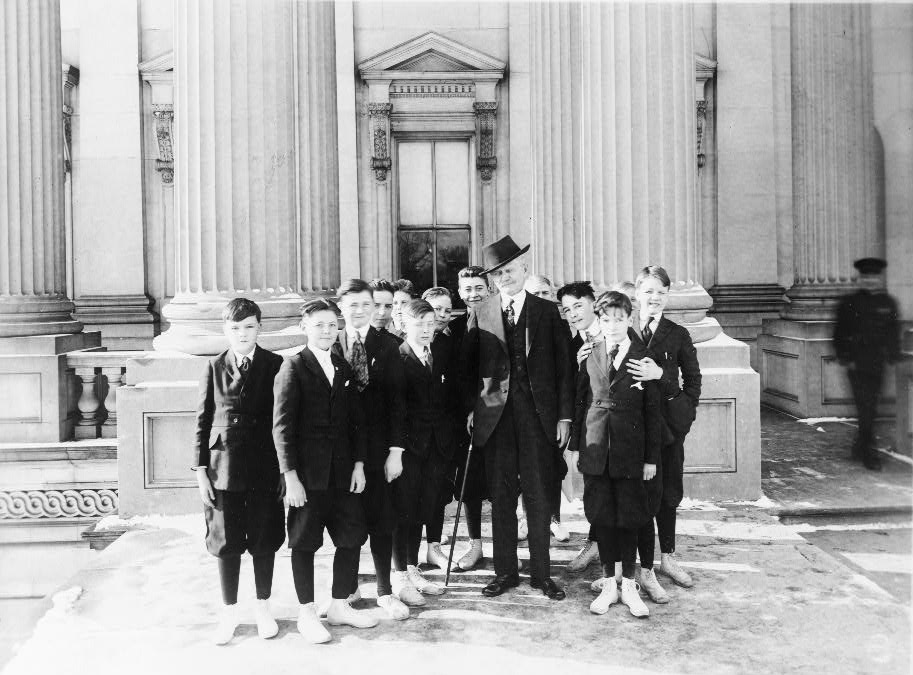
A group of Senate pages with 28th vice president Thomas R. Marshall (1854–1925, served 1913–1921) (under President Woodrow Wilson) on the steps of the Senate north wing on the East Front of the United States Capitol, c. 1913–1921

A United States Senate page (Senate page or simply page) is a high-school age teen serving the United States Senate in Washington, D.C. Pages are nominated by senators, usually from their home state, and perform a variety of tasks, such as delivering messages and legislative documents on the Senate floor and the various Capitol Hill offices. Pages are provided housing and attend a special page school at the Daniel Webster Senate Page Residence. Senate pages were first appointed in 1829. Originally limited to boys only, the Senate page program was expanded in 1971 to include girls. A maximum of 30 pages are assigned to each Senate session, with 16 appointed by the majority party and 14 by the minority. Pages serve senators of the sponsoring senator's party.

== History ==
The Senate Page Program dates back to 1829 when the first page, 9-year-old Grafton Hanson, was appointed by prominent senator Daniel Webster (1782–1852), of Massachusetts. In addition to the delivery of legislative correspondence, early pages were responsible for refilling ink wells, constructing fires, cleaning spittoons, and fetching chewing tobacco. In 1971, Paulette Desell, Ellen McConnell, and Julie Price became the Senate's first female pages. Until 1995, the education of Senate pages was provided by the District of Columbia public schools at a school located in the Library of Congress. Due to the COVID-19 pandemic the page program was suspended on March 13, 2020, for the first time in its history, until September 13, 2022, when the program began letting pages back in.

== Selection ==
To become a U.S. Senate page, one must first be nominated by a senator, generally from their state. A candidate must be a sixteen- or seventeen-year-old high school junior (11th grade), with at least a 3.0 GPA. Processes for selection vary by state and senator. Typically, a senator's office will require the applicant to submit a transcript, résumé, and various essays. The process is similar to that of selecting an office employee and may include an interview of final applicants by a board of review. The application process for the program is considered to be extremely competitive, with many applicants for a handful of openings.

Students can apply for appointment to one of four terms: a fall semester (September–January), a spring semester (January–June), a three- or four-week June session, and a three- or four-week July session. If a vacancy opens during the term, the position cannot be filled until the beginning of the next session.

For each session, there are a maximum of 30 pages. The majority appoints 16, while the minority appoints 14.

== Uniform and appearance ==
Because U.S. Senate pages are required to wear uniforms while on the job, they are some of the most recognizable employees of the United States Congress. The uniform consists of a navy blue suitcoat or blazer (jacket), a white, long sleeve, traditional dress shirt, a name badge, page insignia lapel pin, and a plain, navy necktie (for males only). Pages are not allowed to add any decoration to their uniform, and at all times must maintain a conservative appearance. Until the 1960s, boys were still required to wear old fashioned boys clothing styles from before the 1940s, of knickerbockers (shortened pants) with knit stockings as part of their page uniform while on duty, as depicted in the 1941 Hollywood feature film about the role of Senate pages, Adventure in Washington.

As expected of most Senate employees, pages are required to maintain a neat, professional appearance. Boys must be clean-shaven with hair kept short and neat, falling above their ears. Girls must also have their hair neat and kept out of their face. No extraneous jewelry is to be worn. Pages may not wear unnatural nail polish colors or excessive makeup.

== Residence ==
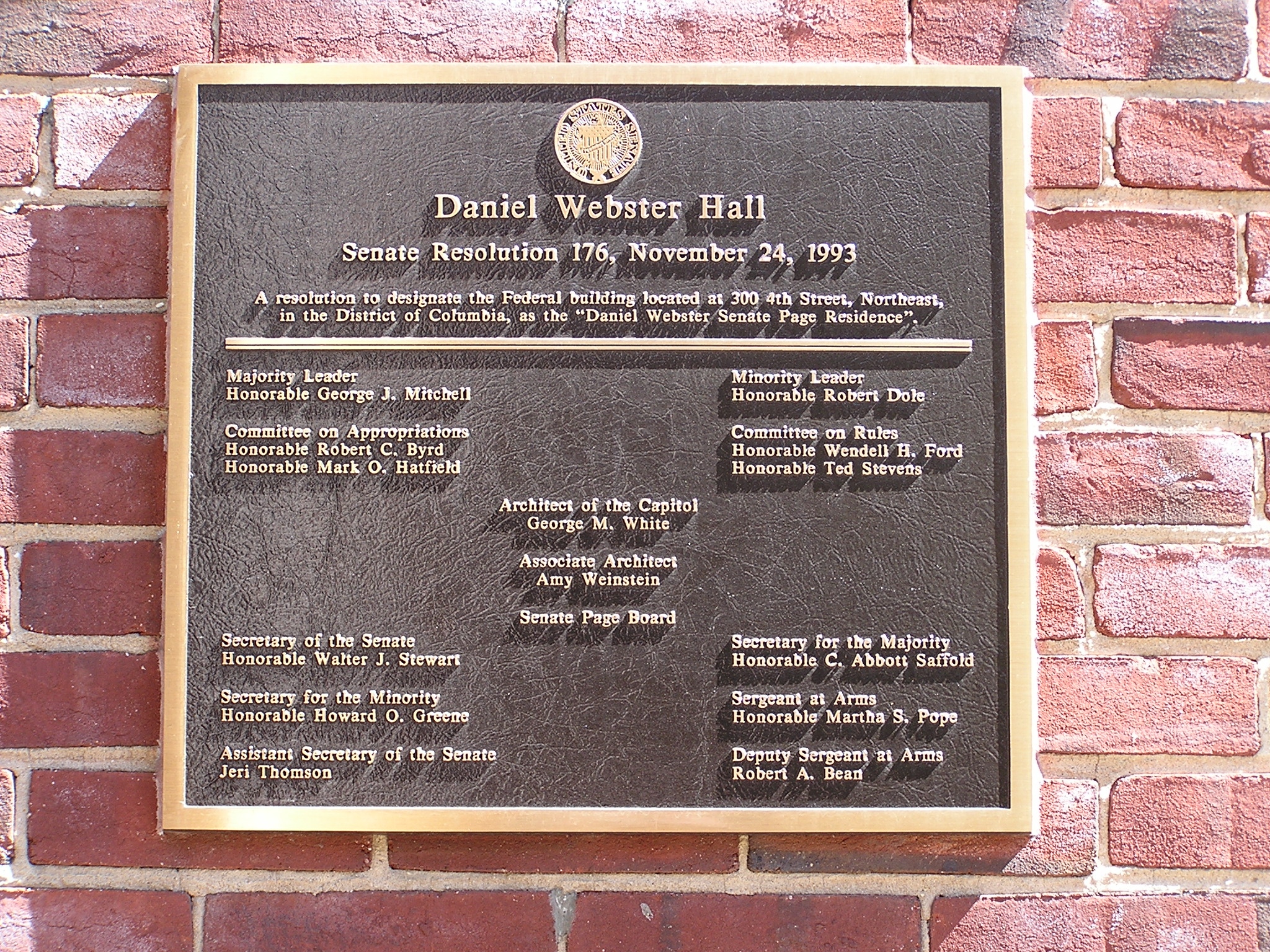
Bronze Plaque of dedication on exterior wall outside the U.S. Senate's Daniel Webster Senate Page Residence (Daniel Webster Hall), at 300 Fourth Street, N.E., Washington, D.C., in 1993

U.S. Senate pages reside at the Daniel Webster Senate Page Residence (Daniel Webster Hall). This facility was a former private funeral home at 300 Fourth Street, N.E., and was renovated / reconfigured to provide Senate pages with "a home away from home" during their memorable time serving in Washington. Administration and staff include the Senate Page Program director, administrative assistant, resident proctors, and one non-resident proctor. It is located near the newest Hart Senate Office Building, several blocks northeast of the U.S. Capitol, and adjacent other Senate Office Buildings.

Pages are held to extremely high academic and moral standards. Some have even been dismissed for disrespectful or unbecoming behavior. They are subject to strict curfews, are prohibited from having personal cell phones or internet access at Webster Hall (with the exception of Senate computers used for school work), and maintain demanding schedules. Pages are issued demerits for forgetting to push in their desk chair, make their bed, leaving toiletries in the bathroom, leaving a mess in rooms/common spaces, or for eschewing curfew. If a page accrues 10 demerits, they are put on room restriction, and cannot roam outside of their room after 9:00 pm; the more demerits a page builds up, the more serious the consequences. Although pages are allowed to have personal electronic devices (excluding mobile phones), they may not take photographs or videos, given the confidential nature of their jobs. They are also strictly forbidden from speaking to members of the news media without the permission of the program director.

The pages are provided living quarters at Webster Hall on two floors, one for males and the other for females, with a day room on each floor for social activity. All pages share furnished rooms with other pages, with four to six occupants.

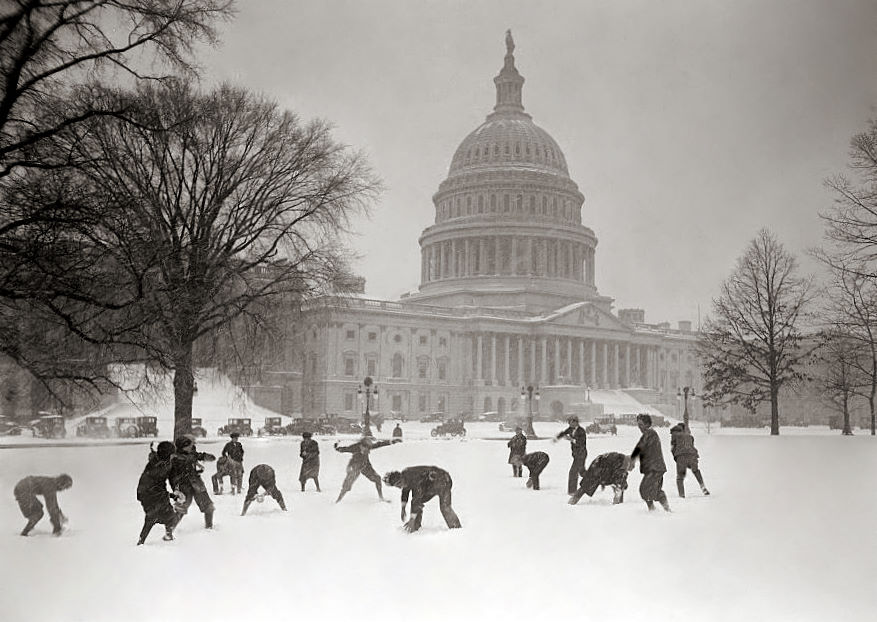
Senate pages having a snowball fight in front of the Capitol, ca. 1925

== School ==
U.S. Senate pages (who serve during either of the semester programs) attend school located in the lower level of Webster Hall. The U.S. Senate Page School is accredited by the Middle States Association of Colleges and Secondary Schools. The Page School requires each student to enroll in four classes, in the various subjects of mathematics, science, English, and social studies. Foreign language tutoring is available. Usually the students receive 5 to 6 hours of homework each night. If they do not maintain at least a C in each class, they are subject to dismissal.

Classes begin weekdays at 6:15 am, with class length depending on the Senate schedule. Generally, school ends one hour and 15 minutes before the Senate convenes. If the Senate does not convene, or convenes at 11:00 a.m. or later, school ends at 9:45 am. It is possible to have classes as short as 20 minutes, or no classes at all. This is affected by what time the Senate convenes as well as what time it adjourned the previous day. If the Senate is in recess, classes may run as late as noon.

Pages must be in uniform for classes, and may not enter the Page School otherwise (except on weekends to access the library). The Page School supervises student government and the preparation of a yearbook. It also administers Senate Page School class rings, which have the U.S. Senate emblem and session number of the Congress in place of a typical high school's seal and/or mascot.

Pages are also required to participate in regular school field trips. Run by the Senate Page School, they are conducted approximately one Saturday a month to sites in or around Washington. These field trips are usually at historically oriented landmarks in the Middle Atlantic states area (i.e. the Liberty Bell and Independence Hall in Philadelphia; DuPont Mills, in Delaware; Fort McHenry or the Star-Spangled Banner Flag House in Baltimore, George Washington's Mount Vernon estate and Fort Washington on the Potomac River, and American Civil War battlefields in Virginia and Maryland or at Gettysburg, Pennsylvania, or Thomas Jefferson's hilltop estate Monticello near Charlottesville, Virginia, etc.)

The Secretary of the United States Senate is responsible for the United States Senate Page School. Prior to the page residence / dormitory being moved to the Daniel Webster Hall on Fourth Street, N.E. in 1995, the U.S. Senate Page School was housed in the cupola / attic / top floor of the Thomas Jefferson Building, built 1890–1897, the oldest part of the Library of Congress multi-buildings complex, across First Street to the east from the Capitol.

== Summer pages ==
During the summer sessions only, pages may live at home or in the homes of their relatives in the Washington, D.C., area. Commuter summer pages fulfill the same duties as the residential summer pages, except that they arrive at 9:00 a.m. and depart at 6:00 p.m. regardless of the action of the Senate that day (residential pages are required to stay until after the Senate adjourns for the day). Commuter pages are allowed to participate in field trips with the other pages. Summer pages do not attend the Senate Page School.

== Legislative Page program scrutiny ==
The U.S. Senate Page Program has undergone massive political, legal, social, economic and personal scrutiny by both government and the American media throughout the years, as recounted in The Children Who Ran for Congress: A History of Congressional Pages by Darryl Gonzalez. The House Page Program was shut down in 2011, following multiple sex scandals involving pages and members of Congress or others, though not directly attributed to it.

While the Senate Page Program remained intact after previous controversies / scandals in recent decades affecting it and the former parallel House of Representatives page system in the lower chamber of the Congress (although the Senate system continued, but underwent major adjustments and changes at several points in its recent history), it is sometimes criticized as being overly patronage-based, too demanding on minors, and too isolating for its participants. Pages are not allowed to have personal cell / smart phones during their tenure and are forbidden from accessing the internet at Daniel Webster Hall, except for educational purposes. Pages often get less than six hours of sleep a night and must maintain above an 80 percent average in rigorous academic courses, in addition to working sometimes over 60 hours a week at the Senate. Pages do, however, have free access to physical / medical healthcare and psychological / social counseling during their stay in the Nation's Capital.

== Notable former Senate pages ==
- Spiro T. Agnew (later Baltimore County Executive, Governor of Maryland, and first Vice President under President Richard M. Nixon)
- Bobby Baker – senior staffer / later controversial lobbyist to Senator, later President Lyndon B. Johnson during the 1950s / 1960s
- Michael Bennet (later a senator, D-CO)
- Dan Boren – summer 1989 (later a U.S. Representative (congressman)
- Amy Carter – daughter of President Jimmy Carter
- Morgan Lyon Cotti – associate director of the Hinckley Institute of Politics
- Thomas M. Davis – 1963–1967 (later U.S. Representative (Congressman)
- Christopher Dodd (later a U.S. senator, D-CT and presidential candidate)
- Laura Dove – former U.S. Senate secretary for the majority
- Robert J. Fulton – President of Boston College
- Arthur Pue Gorman – U.S. senator from Maryland, during late 19th and early 20th centuries
- Neil Gorsuch – Associate Justice of the U.S. Supreme Court
- Josh Gottheimer (later a member of the U.S. House of Representatives, D-NJ)
- Jim Kolbe (later a member of the U.S. House of Representatives, R-AZ)
- Mike Lee (later a U.S. senator, R-UT)
- Robby Mook (campaign manager of the Hillary Clinton 2016 presidential campaign)
- Hannah Pingree – 1992 (later speaker, Maine House of Representatives, 2008–2010; state representative 2002–2011)
- Jason Rae – secretary of the Democratic National Committee
- John H. Pratt – federal judge
- Mark Pryor (later a U.S. senator, D-AR)
- Jack Schlossberg – American journalist, son of Caroline Kennedy Schlossberg, only grandson of President John F. Kennedy and First Lady Jacqueline Kennedy Onassis
- Abigail Spanberger – Former member of the U.S. House of Representatives, D-VA, governor of Virginia
- Mead Treadwell – American businessman and politician; served as lieutenant governor of Alaska 2010–2014, chaired the U.S. Arctic Research Commission under President George W. Bush
- Gore Vidal – American writer/author and public intellectual known for his essays, novels, and Broadway plays

== See also ==
- United States House of Representatives Page
- Canadian Senate Page Program
- Canadian House of Commons Page Program
