= Canadian House of Commons Page Program =

Student internship program of the House of Commons of Canada

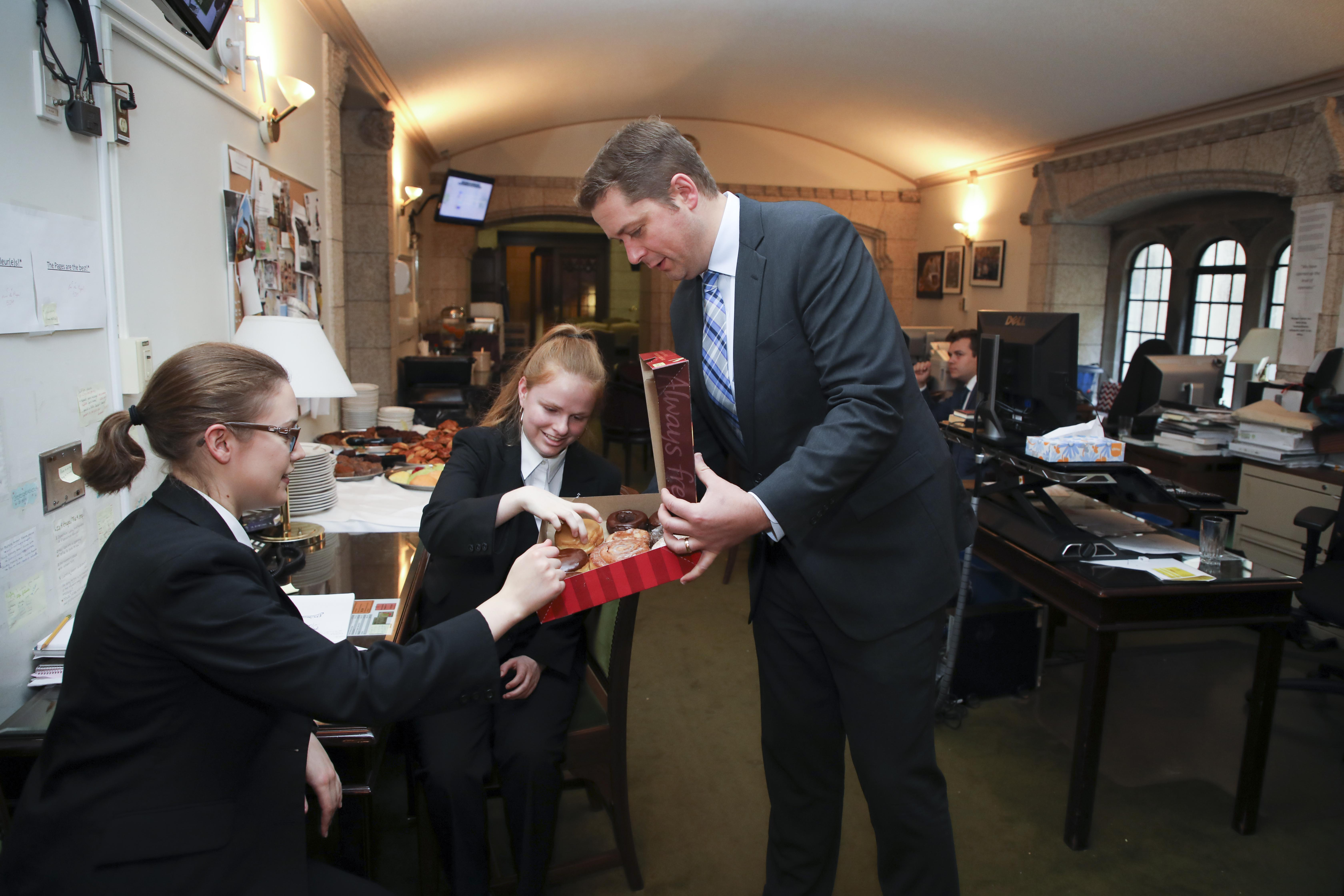
Andrew Scheer with pages, 2018

The Canadian House of Commons Page Program is a student internship program of the House of Commons of Canada. Every year, 40 undergraduate students are selected via national competition to work for the House of Commons as pages. Pages perform both ceremonial and administrative duties, including:

- participation in the Speaker's parade,
- delivering documents and water to Members of Parliament (MPs) in the Chamber and in House committees,
- answering telephones in the lobbies and delivering messages to MPs, and
- assisting the Speaker, Clerks, Sergeant-at-Arms and other House officers in the Chamber.

Pages work an average of 15 hours per week in the House of Commons while studying full-time at one of the four universities (University of Ottawa, Carleton University, Université du Québec en Outaouais, or Saint Paul University) in the National Capital Region. They are paid approximately $16,587 (CDN) for their one-year term, in 26 equal payments. In addition to this, $1,200 is given upon successful completion of employment.

Pages take part in a number of activities throughout the year designed to enrich their experience, including meetings with MPs and government leaders. They also meet frequently with student groups to explain the workings of the House and their duties as pages.

== Selection process ==
Forty graduating high school (or CEGEP in Quebec) students are selected each year to serve as pages in the House of Commons. Applications are open to candidates from across the country. Pages must be fluent in both official languages of Canada (English and French) and pass a security screening by the Canadian Security Intelligence Service. They are selected based on a written essay, a second-language interview and a face-to-face interview. Once chosen, one of the first challenges for pages is to learn the names and faces of all 343 MPs in the House. After a week's training, prior to starting their term, pages are sworn in by the Speaker and Clerk of the House of Commons.

== History ==
The Page Program dates back to at least Confederation (1867) though it was quite different at that time. Pages were male only, and boys as young as 11 years old were selected. One of the more unusual requirements was that pages had to be short of stature, in order to be as unobtrusive as possible. They were paid CA$1.50 (equivalent to $33.84 in 2025) per day. Pages were chosen by the Speaker, with help from the Sergeant-at-Arms, and they held the position until they outgrew their uniforms. The term "House Page" was used as far back as 1841 in the Journals of the Legislative Assembly of the Province of Canada.

In 1968, a minimum working age of 16 years was adopted but it is only in 1978, after an article in The Wall Street Journal criticized the pages' working conditions, that the previous system was completely discarded in favour of the current one. It was only in 1978 that women were able to participate in the program, as opposed to the all boys program that existed prior. Some of the pages from the old system were kept on as "senior pages" to supervise the new pages and serve as a form of continuity. Notable among these first senior pages were Andre Frechette and David Lavictoire.

Although officially under the auspices and jurisdiction of the Speaker of the House, the Page Program for the first 20 years was the full-time responsibility of Miss Annette Leger, a former assistant to federal Liberal Cabinet Minister Donald Stovel Macdonald.

== Notable alumni ==
- Charles Marcil: Speaker of the House of Commons of Canada from 1909-1911. Was a Page under the pre-1978 system.
- Marc Bosc: Former Acting Clerk of the House of Commons (Alumnus - 1978-79)
- Catherine Cano: President and General Manager of CPAC (Cable Public Affairs Channel) (Alumna 1981-1982)
- Bernard Drainville: Journalist and former Parti Québécois cabinet minister (Alumnus 1982-83)
- Bernard Trottier: Former MP for Etobicoke—Lakeshore (Alumnus - 1983-84)
- Jean-Yves Duclos: Current Minister of Health, and MP for Québec (Alumnus - 1984-1985)
- Joel-Denis Bellavance: Journalist, Ottawa Bureau Chief for La Presse (Alumnus - 1986-87)
- Rita Celli: CBC Television anchor and radio host (Alumna - 1987-88)
- Steve Desroches: former Deputy Mayor and City Councillor for the City of Ottawa (Alumnus 1988-89)
- Greg Fergus: Former Speaker of the House of Commons of Canada and MP for Hull—Aylmer (Alumnus - 1988-1989)
- Eve Adams: Former MP for Mississauga—Brampton South (Alumna 1992-93)
- Marc Kielburger CM: social entrepreneur, founder of ME to WE (Alumnus 1995-96)
- Katie Telford: Former Chief of Staff to the Prime Minister of Canada (Alumna 1997-98)
- Andrew Price: Executive Commissioner and CEO of Scouts Canada (Alumnus 1998-99)

== See also ==
- Canadian Senate Page Program
- U.S. House of Representatives Page Program
- United States Senate Page
