= Peter Muhlenberg Memorial =

Sculpture in Washington, D.C., U.S.

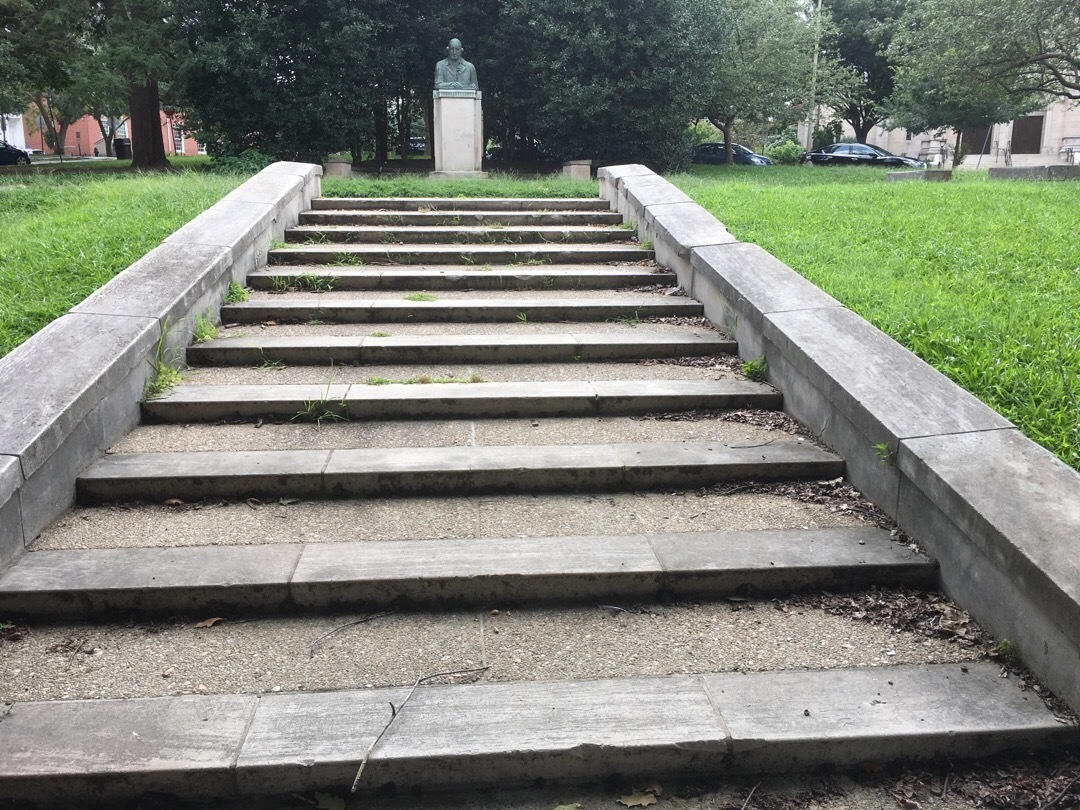
- The memorial in 2018
- Interactive map of Peter Muhlenberg Memorial
- Location: Muhlenberg Park, Washington, D.C., United States
- Coordinates: 38°57′13″N 77°04′10″W
- Designer: Caroline Hufford (sculptor); John Harbeson (architect)
- Material: bronze (sculpture); limestone (base); concrete (exedra)
- Height: 4 feet (1.2 m) (sculpture); 8.16 feet (2.49 m) (base); 2 feet (0.61 m) (exedra)
- Opening date: October 26, 1980
- Dedicated to: Peter Muhlenberg

John Peter Gabriel Muhlenberg, commonly known as the Peter Muhlenberg Memorial, is a public monument in Washington, D.C. It honors Peter Muhlenberg, a Lutheran minister, Continental Army general, Federalist Era American politician, and member of the prominent Muhlenberg family. The memorial is located in a one-acre park bounded by Connecticut Avenue, Ellicott Street, and 36th Street NW on the eastern edge of Washington's Wakefield neighborhood. Designed by architect John Harbeson, it features at its center a bronze bust of Muhlenberg, sculpted by his descendant, Caroline M. Hufford. Completed in 1980, 52 years after its construction was authorized by Congress, attendees at the dedication ceremony included West German ambassador Peter Hermes.

The bronze sculpture of Muhlenberg is displayed on a limestone pedestal and surrounded on three sides by a concrete exedra. The memorial is owned and maintained by the National Park Service, a federal agency of the Interior Department.

== History ==
=== Background ===
In the late 19th century, the site of Muhlenberg Park was the intersection of Grant Road and Chappell Road in rural Washington County, D.C. In 1871, Washington County, Washington City, and Georgetown were unified under one district government, establishing the modern boundaries of Washington, D.C. Over the following decades, motorized streetcars made settlement in the far Northwest of the city more feasible. In 1907, the completion of a bridge over the Rock Creek gorge allowed Connecticut Avenue to run uninterrupted from downtown to Chevy Chase, Maryland. As the area was developed, Grant Road was gradually built over and replaced with a street grid, leaving only a few disconnected segments, including the Grant Road Historic District, remaining. Chappell Road was connected to 36th Street NW and renamed, leaving a small, triangular piece of land between it and Connecticut Avenue.

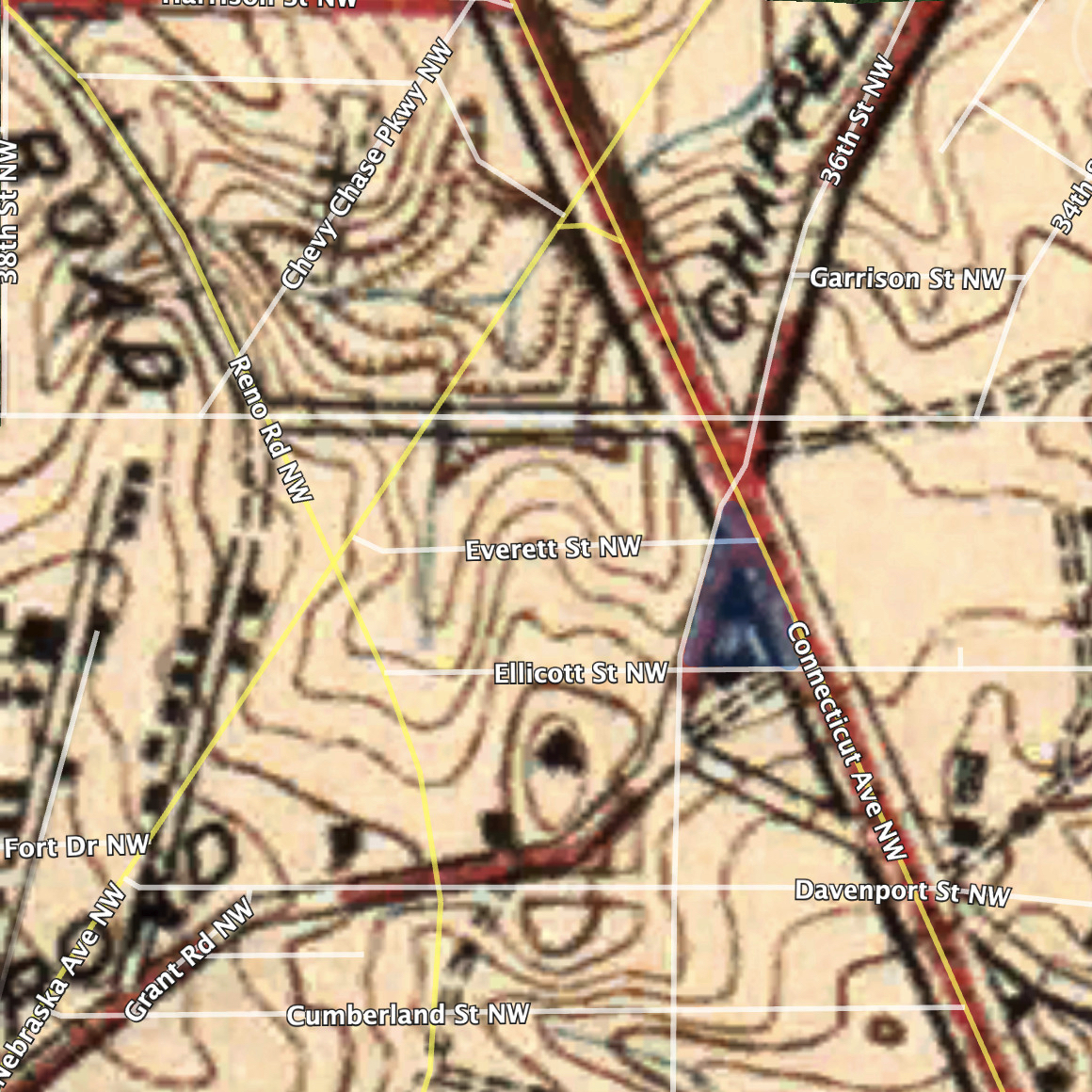
1917 United States Geological Survey topographic map, with modern streets overlaid. The location of Muhlenberg Park is highlighted in blue.

In 1925, the Evangelical Lutheran Church of the Epiphany, located on 16th and U Streets NW, purchased 4900 Connecticut Avenue NW, at the intersection of Connecticut and Ellicott, from the Chevy Chase Land Company, intending to relocate there. The following year, Epiphany agreed to merge with St. Paul's English Lutheran Church, keeping the St. Paul's name and charter and using the Connecticut Avenue site for a new building. St. Paul's, founded in 1843 and based at the southwest corner of 11th and H Streets NW since 1845, had grown such that their historic edifice could no longer accommodate the size of the congregation. The Church set aside the front portion of the new property, cut off from the rest by 36th Street, for donation to the federal government, as a site for a memorial to Lutheran minister, Revolutionary War hero, and early-American politician Peter Muhlenberg.

=== Planning ===
On May 2, 1928, Congress passed Public Resolution No. 30, authorizing construction of the monument, with funds to be raised by the Peter Muhlenberg Memorial Association and the design to be approved by the United States Congress Joint Committee on the Library and the Commission of Fine Arts. Congressmen Alfred L. Bulwinkle of North Carolina, who sponsored the resolution, and R. Walton Moore of Virginia both spoke in favor of its passage in the House of Representatives. Calling Muhlenberg "one of America's great men," Bulwinkle opined that "the appreciation of Congress should be given to the Peter Muhlenberg Memorial Association for the idea of erecting here, in the Capital of the Nation, a fitting monument to serve as a memorial to one of the men who helped to found this Republic." Before further action could be taken, financial problems caused by the Great Depression resulted in delayed construction of the new church building and a halt in fundraising for the memorial.

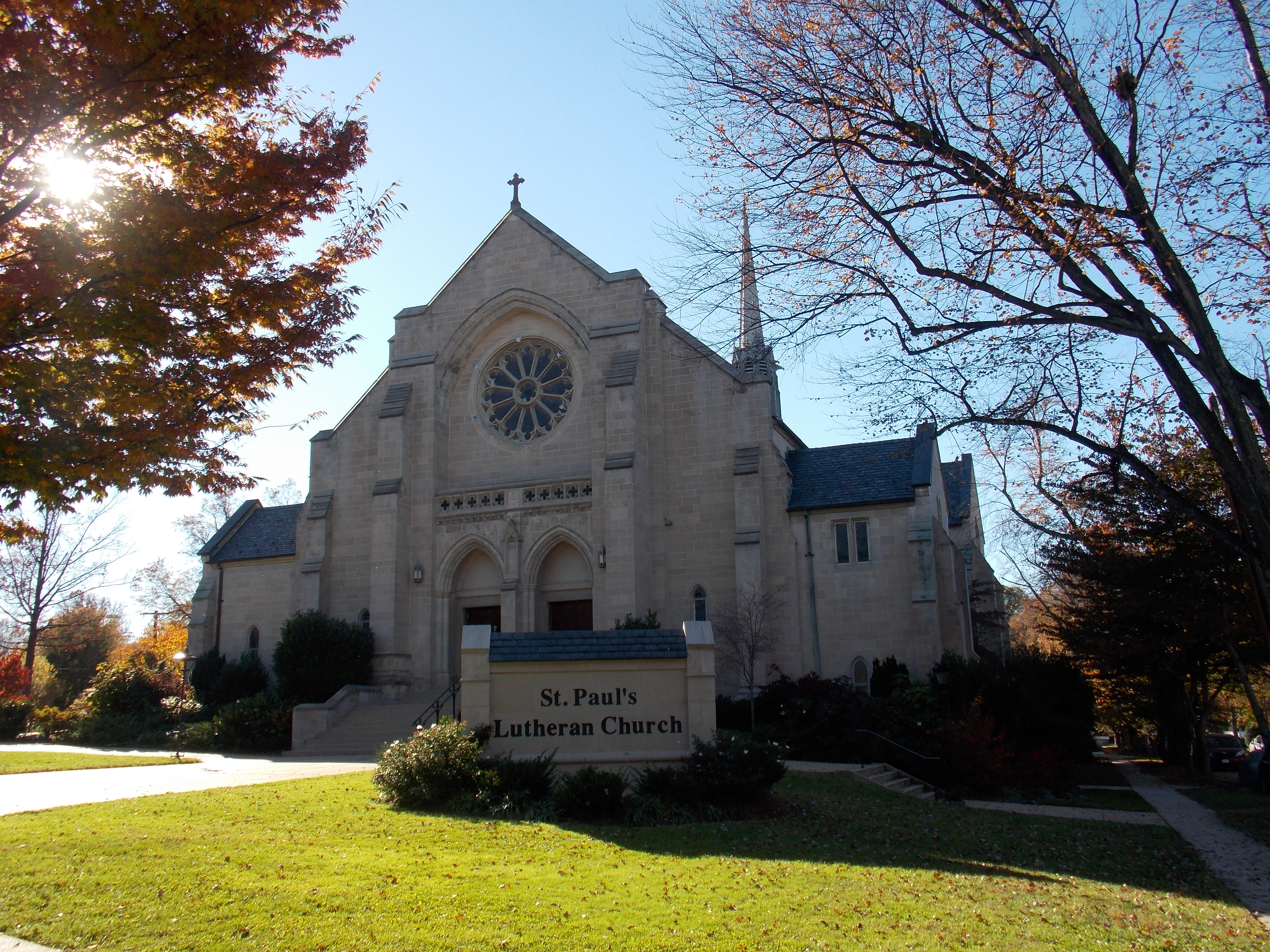
St. Paul's Lutheran Church from 36th Street NW in 2015

In 1959, the year after the church was completed, a committee was named to begin soliciting funds for the memorial's construction. Washington attorney and St. Paul's congregant Henry F. Lerch III was instrumental in relaunching the project, serving as chairman of the Memorial Association, with the goal of completing it in time for the United States Bicentennial. John Harbeson of the Philadelphia firm Harbeson, Hough, Livingston & Larson, a former president of the National Academy of Design, was chosen as the architect while Charles Town, West Virginia-based artist Caroline Muhlenberg Hufford was chosen to sculpt the bust at its center. Hufford, formerly of Reading, Pennsylvania and Arlington, Virginia, was a daughter of noted architect and former Pennsylvania Congressman, Frederick A. Muhlenberg, and a third great-granddaughter of Peter Muhlenberg. The E. A. Baker Company of Washington was hired as general contractor. Following several changes to the site's preliminary design, including reducing the height of the proposed backing wall, the Commission of Fine Arts gave its approval in September 1975. The memorial cost $59,430 to build (equivalent to $263,634 in 2025).

=== Dedication ===
The memorial was formally dedicated on Reformation Sunday, October 26, 1980. Approximately 300 people attended the ceremony, including West German Ambassador to the United States Peter Hermes and Mayor James Lambert of Woodstock, Virginia, the town where Muhlenberg preached prior to the American Revolution; a color guard from Woodstock and about thirty Muhlenberg descendants were also in attendance.

Dr. Russell Zimmerman, former pastor of the historic Augustus Lutheran Church in Trappe, Pennsylvania, gave a sermon at a preceding church service, calling Muhlenberg, "a giant among giants of the American fight for justice, liberty and independence." Afterward, Henry Lerch was given the honor of unveiling the statue, and Robert Stanton, Deputy Director of the National Park Service for the National Capital Parks, delivered a speech accepting it on behalf of the federal government.

=== Later history ===
The memorial and surrounding park are owned and maintained by the National Park Service, a federal agency of the Interior Department, as part of the Rock Creek Park administrative area. The park runs along the Fort Circle Parks greenway, a proposal inspired by an unrealized portion of the McMillan Plan. Under its 1968, 2004 and 2010 master plans, the Park Service and National Capital Planning Commission suggested the creation of a system of trails connecting the Fort Circle Parks, including nearby Fort Reno, to each other and other open spaces in the District.

== Design and location ==
The memorial sits in the center of Muhlenberg Park in the northwest quadrant of Washington, D.C., alongside a segment of Wakefield's eastern border with Forest Hills. The one-acre pocket park is located on the plot of land bounded by Connecticut Avenue, Ellicott Street, and 36th Street NW. It is directly adjacent to St. Paul's Lutheran Church and Engine Company 31, which are to the west and northwest, respectively. Also close by are Politics and Prose and Comet Ping Pong, one block up Connecticut Avenue.

The bronze bust of Muhlenberg sits atop a limestone base. The approximately 4 feet (1.2 m) high by 4 feet (1.2 m) wide sculpture depicts Muhlenberg in civilian dress, with his hands resting on an open Bible before him. The base, which stands approximately 8 feet 2 inches (2.49 m) tall, resembles a pulpit and features, on three sides, carvings representing Muhlenberg's contributions to his country as a Clergyman, Soldier, and Statesman. The Clergyman side features an image of a Latin cross and the years, "1768–1776" inscribed below it. The Soldier side features an image of a saber and the years, "1774–1783." The Statesman side features an image of a fasces and the years, "1787–1807." The inscription at the front of the base reads: "JOHN PETER GABRIEL MUHLENBERG, 1746–1807; Serving HIS CHURCH, HIS COUNTRY, HIS STATE." A rectangular concrete exedra with three plaques, each containing biographical information about Muhlenberg, flanks the rear and sides of the memorial.

The memorial was originally intended to feature two fountains along with a pond or reflecting pool, both to be added during a second phase of construction. These plans were never realized.

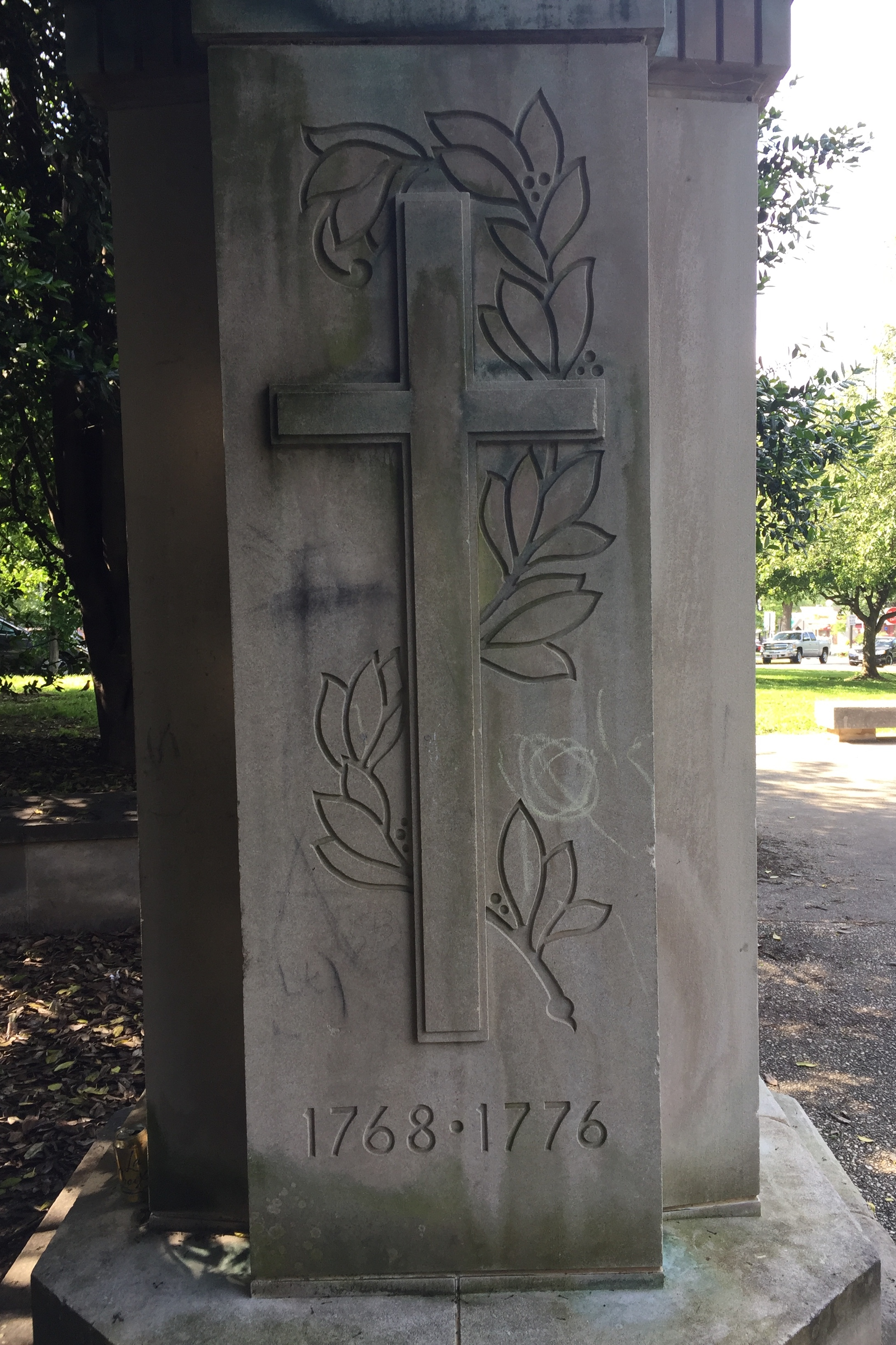
Clergyman

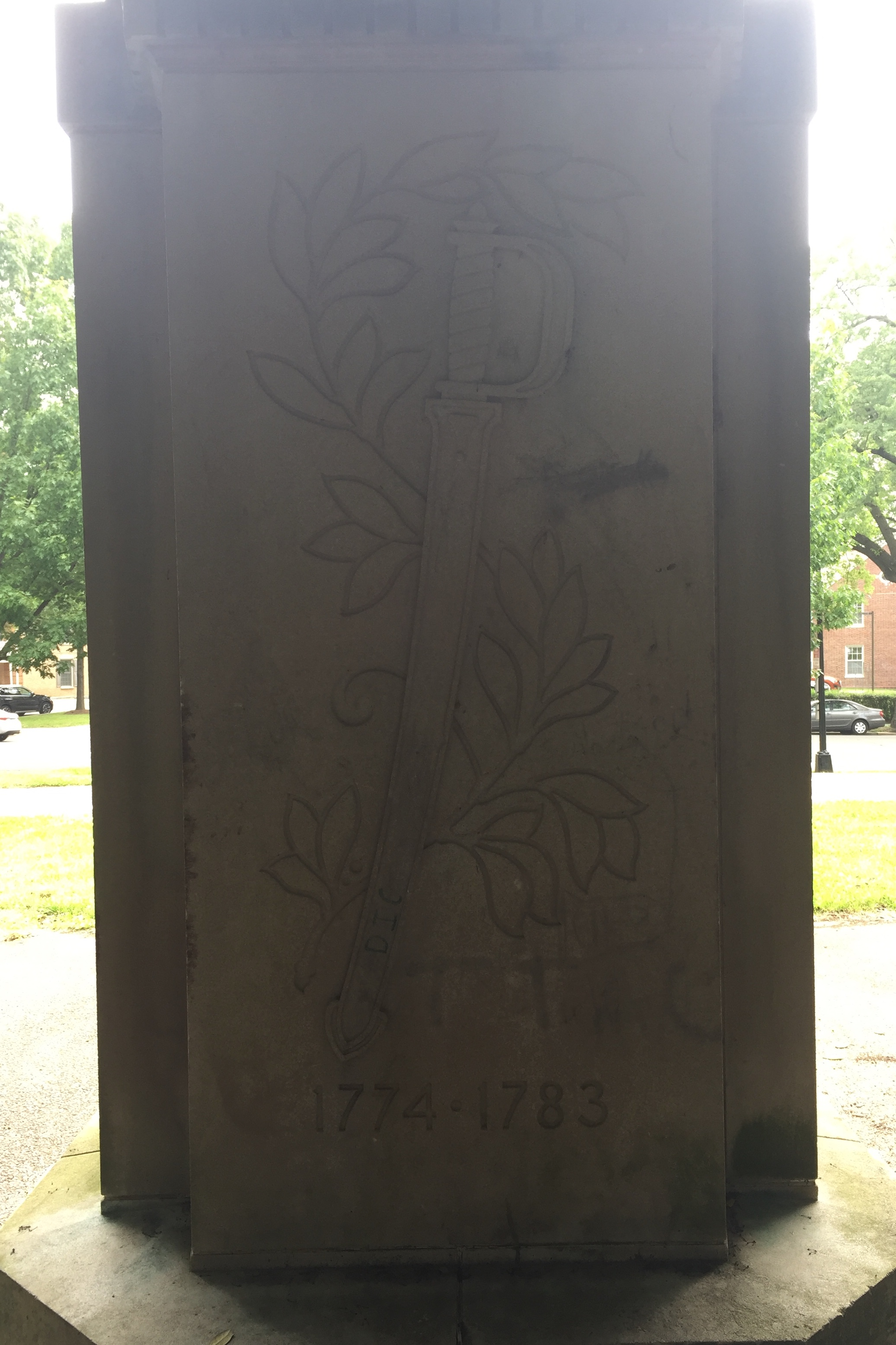
Soldier

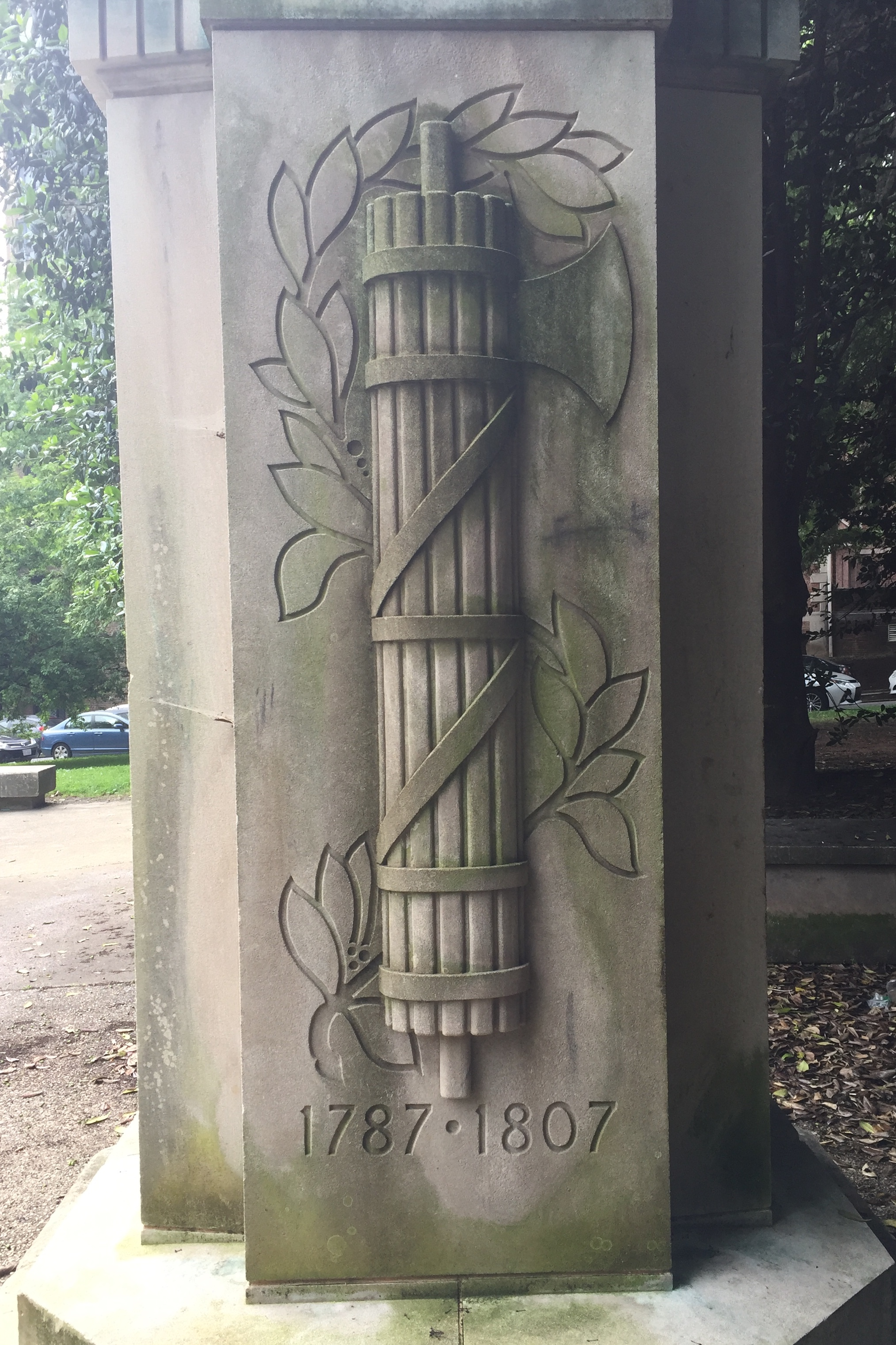
Statesman

== See also ==
- List of public art in Washington, D.C., Ward 3
- Outdoor sculpture in Washington, D.C.
