= Rayburn House Office Building =

Government building in Washington, D.C.

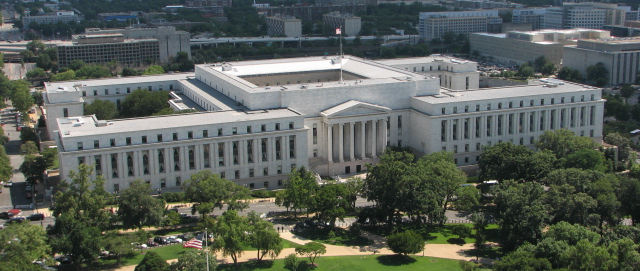
- View of Rayburn Office from United States Capitol dome (2007)
- Interactive map of the Rayburn House Office Building area

General information
- Status: Completed
- Architectural style: Neoclassical
- Location: United States Capitol Complex, Washington, D.C., United States
- Coordinates: 38°53′12.48″N 77°0′37.8″W
- Opened: February 1965; 61 years ago

Technical details
- Material: Marble
- Grounds: 2,395,914 square feet (222,587.7 m^{2})

Design and construction
- Architecture firm: H2L2

The Rayburn House Office Building (RHOB) is a congressional office building for the U.S. House of Representatives in the Capitol Hill neighborhood of Washington, D.C., between South Capitol Street and First Street.

Rayburn is named after former Speaker of the House Sam Rayburn. It was completed in 1965 and at 2.375 million square feet (220,644 m^{2}) is the largest congressional office building.

== History ==
Rayburn was completed in early 1965 and is home to the offices of 169 representatives.

Earlier efforts to provide space for the House of Representatives had included the construction of the Cannon House Office Building and the Longworth House Office Building. In March 1955, House speaker Sam Rayburn introduced an amendment for a third House office building, although no site had been identified, no architectural study had been done, and no plans prepared.

The area west of the Longworth Building on squares 635 and 636 was chosen, with the main entrance on Independence Avenue and garage and pedestrian entrances on South Capitol Street, C Street, and First Street Southwest. The cornerstone was laid in May 1962, and full occupancy began in February 1965.

== Architecture ==
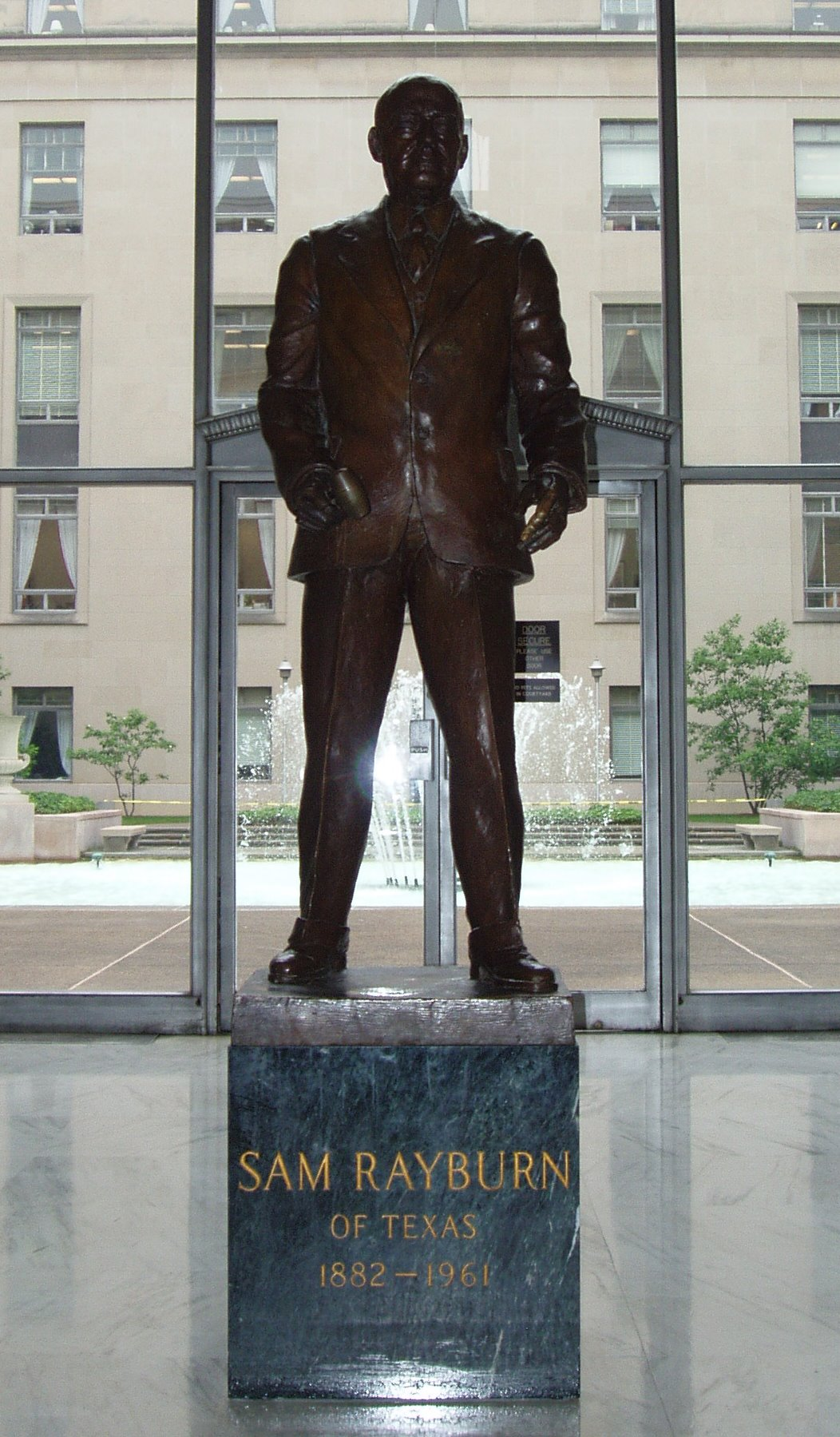
A statue of Rayburn near the ground level courtyard

The Architect of the Capitol, J. George Stewart, with the approval of the House Office Building Commission, selected the firm of Harbeson, Hough, Livingston & Larson of Philadelphia to design a stripped-down classical building in architectural harmony with other Capitol Hill structures. However, while the interior design of the other House Office Buildings retains decor one would expect to see in House Office Buildings (with cherry wood paneling, brass railings, and marble floors), the Rayburn building possesses design style parallel to that of the 1960s, with chrome push bars, clocks, and elevators, and space-age fluorescent lighting fixtures.

The Capitol Subway System, an underground transportation system, connects the building to the Capitol. Pedestrian tunnels also connect the Rayburn building to the Capitol and to the Longworth House Office Building. This system allows the Rayburn building to be connected to most of the Congressional office buildings on Capitol Hill via tunnel (the Ford House Office Building is freestanding and attached to no other structures by tunnel).

For construction of the Rayburn House Office Building, the Congressional bill appropriated $2 million plus "such additional sums as may be necessary." Such additional sums eventually exceeded $99 million. Congressional leaders inserted a gymnasium into the building plans, a fact that was not publicly known at the time of construction. The gym is below the sub-basement level, in a level of the underground parking garage, and according to The Hill, a newspaper focused on Capitol Hill, "features dozens of cardio machines outfitted with TV screens, an array of Cybex weightlifting machines and free weights." Also in the third floor basement is a shooting range run by the U.S. Capitol Police and a basketball court.

== FBI raid ==
On May 20, 2006 Federal Bureau of Investigation (FBI) agents raided the Rayburn Building office of Democratic Congressman William J. Jefferson in connection to an ongoing bribery investigation, marking the first time the FBI had raided the office of a sitting congressman. The raid led to members of both parties questioning the constitutionality of the action, and a subsequent hearing by the House Judiciary Committee. The legality of the raid was challenged in court, where a federal appeals court ruled that the FBI had violated the Speech or Debate Clause of the United States Constitution by allowing the executive branch to review materials that were part of the legislative process.

== 2006 shooting reports ==
On May 26, 2006, at 10:30 am local time, there were reports of the sounds of gunfire in the garage of the building. The Capitol complex was sealed off, and staff in the building were told to stay in their offices after the building was put into lockdown by the United States Capitol Police. Some parts of the lockdown were removed, though other areas remained sealed.

Congressman Jim Saxton was reportedly the source of the false alarm, after he mistook construction sounds in the garage for gunfire.

== Representatives with Rayburn offices ==
Name	Party	District	Room
Alma Adams	D	North Carolina 12	Room 2436
Brian Babin	R	Texas 36	Room 2236
Don Bacon	R	Nebraska 2	Room 2104
Jim Baird	R	Indiana 4	Room 2303
Troy Balderson	R	Ohio 12	Room 2429
Andy Barr	R	Kentucky 6	Room 2430
Nanette Barragán	D	California 44	Room 2312
Aaron Bean	R	Florida 4	Room 2459
Joyce Beatty	D	Ohio 3	Room 2079
Stephanie Bice	R	Oklahoma 5	Room 2402
Gus Bilirakis	R	Florida 12	Room 2306
Sanford Bishop	D	Georgia 2	Room 2407
Suzanne Bonamici	D	Oregon 1	Room 2231
Shontel Brown	D	Ohio 11	Room 2455
Julia Brownley	D	California 26	Room 2262
Vern Buchanan	R	Florida 16	Room 2409
Ken Calvert	R	California 41	Room 2205
Kat Cammack	R	Florida 3	Room 2421
Salud Carbajal	D	California 24	Room 2331
André Carson	D	Indiana 7	Room 2135
Buddy Carter	R	Georgia 1	Room 2432
John Carter	R	Texas 31	Room 2208
Ed Case	D	Hawaii 1	Room 2210
Sean Casten	D	Illinois 6	Room 2440
Kathy Castor	D	Florida 14	Room 2188
Joaquin Castro	D	Texas 20	Room 2241
Judy Chu	R	California 28	Room 2423
Gil Cisneros	D	California 31	Room 2463
Katherine Clark	D	Massachusetts 5	Room 2368
Yvette Clarke	D	New York 9	Room 2058
Emanuel Cleaver	D	Missouri 5	Room 2217
Ben Cline	R	Virginia 6	Room 2443
Steve Cohen	D	Tennessee 9	Room 2268
Tom Cole	R	Oklahoma 4	Room 2207
Mike Collins	R	Georgia 10	Room 2351
James Comer	R	Kentucky 1	Room 2410
Lou Correa	D	California 46	Room 2082
Jim Costa	D	California 21	Room 2081
Joe Courtney	D	Connecticut 2	Room 2449
Angie Craig	D	Minnesota 2	Room 2052
Rick Crawford	R	Arkansas 1	Room 2422
Henry Cuellar	D	Texas 28	Room 2308
Sharice Davids	D	Kansas 3	Room 2435
Warren Davidson	R	Ohio 8	Room 2113
Danny Davis	D	Illinois 7	Room 2159
Diana DeGette	D	Colorado 1	Room 2111
Rosa DeLauro	D	Connecticut 3	Room 2413
Suzan DelBene	D	Washington 1	Room 2311
Mark DeSaulnier	D	California 10	Room 2134
Scott DesJarlais	R	Tennessee 4	Room 2304
Lloyd Doggett	D	Texas 37	Room 2307
Veronica Escobar	D	Texas 16	Room 2448
Adriano Espaillat	D	New York 13	Room 2332
Ron Estes	R	Kansas 4	Room 2234
Pat Fallon	R	Texas 4	Room 2416
Randy Feenstra	R	Iowa 4	Room 2434
Cleo Fields	D	Louisiana 6	Room 2349
Brad Finstad	R	Minnesota 1	Room 2418
Michelle Fischbach	R	Minnesota 7	Room 2229
Scott Fitzgerald	R	Wisconsin 5	Room 2444
Chuck Fleischmann	R	Tennessee 3	Room 2187
Lizzie Fletcher	D	Texas 7	Room 2004
Bill Foster	D	Illinois 11	Room 2366
Valerie Foushee	D	North Carolina 4	Room 2452
Virginia Foxx	R	North Carolina 5	Room 2462
Lois Frankel	D	Florida 22	Room 2305
Scott Franklin	R	Florida 18	Room 2301
Clay Fuller	R	Georgia 14	Room 2201
John Garamendi	D	California 8	Room 2428
Andrew Garbarino	R	New York 2	Room 2344
Chuy García	D	Illinois 4	Room 2334
Sylvia Garcia	D	Texas 29	Room 2419
Lance Gooden	R	Texas 5	Room 2431
Paul Gosar	R	Arizona 9	Room 2057
Al Green	D	Texas 9	Room 2347
Morgan Griffith	R	Virginia 9	Room 2110
Brett Guthrie	R	Kentucky 2	Room 2161
Jahana Hayes	D	Connecticut 5	Room 2049
Jim Himes	D	Connecticut 4	Room 2137
Ashley Hinson	R	Iowa 2	Room 2458
Richard Hudson	R	North Carolina 9	Room 2112
Jared Huffman	D	California 2	Room 2330
Bill Huizenga	R	Michigan 4	Room 2232
Darrell Issa	R	California 48	Room 2108
Sara Jacobs	D	California 51	Room 2348
Pramila Jayapal	D	Washington 7	Room 2346
Hakeem Jeffries	D	New York 8	Room 2267
Hank Johnson	D	Georgia 4	Room 2240
Jim Jordan	R	Ohio 4	Room 2056
David Joyce	R	Ohio 14	Room 2065
John Joyce	R	Pennsylvania 13	Room 2102
Marcy Kaptur	D	Ohio 9	Room 2314
Bill Keating	D	Massachusetts 9	Room 2372
Robin Kelly	D	Illinois 2	Room 2329
Trent Kelly	R	Mississippi 1	Room 2243
Kevin Kiley	I	California 3	Room 2445
Young Kim	R	California 40	Room 2439
Raja Krishnamoorthi	D	Illinois 8	Room 2367
Greg Landsman	D	Ohio 1	Room 2244
Rick Larsen	D	Washington 2	Room 2163
Bob Latta	R	Ohio 5	Room 2470
Laurel Lee	R	Florida 15	Room 2464
Summer Lee	D	Pennsylvania 12	Room 2437
Teresa Leger Fernández	D	New Mexico 3	Room 2417
Mike Levin	D	California 49	Room 2352
Ted Lieu	D	California 36	Room 2454
Barry Loudermilk	R	Georgia 11	Room 2133
Frank Lucas	R	Oklahoma 3	Room 2405
Stephen Lynch	D	Massachusetts 8	Room 2109
Thomas Massie	R	Kentucky 4	Room 2371
Brian Mast	R	Florida 21	Room 2182
Doris Matsui	D	California 7	Room 2206
Lucy McBath	D	Georgia 6	Room 2246
Michael McCaul	R	Texas 10	Room 2300
Tom McClintock	R	California 5	Room 2256
Betty McCollum	D	Minnesota 4	Room 2426
Gregory Meeks	D	New York 5	Room 2310
Rob Menendez	D	New Jersey 8	Room 2453
Grace Meng	D	New York 6	Room 2468
Kweisi Mfume	D	Maryland 7	Room 2263
Gwen Moore	D	Wisconsin 4	Room 2252
Frank Mrvan	R	Indiana 1	Room 2441
Jerry Nadler	D	New York 12	Room 2132
Joe Neguse	D	Colorado 2	Room 2400
Donald Norcross	D	New Jersey 1	Room 2427
Eleanor Holmes Norton	D	District of Columbia at-large	Room 2136
Jay Obernolte	R	California 23	Room 2433
Frank Pallone	D	New Jersey 6	Room 2107
Jimmy Patronis	R	Florida 1	Room 2021
Scott Perry	R	Pennsylvania 10	Room 2160
Scott Peters	D	California 50	Room 2369
August Pfluger	R	Texas 11	Room 2202
Chellie Pingree	D	Maine 1	Room 2354
Stacey Plaskett	D	U.S. Virgin Islands at-large	Room 2059
Mike Quigley	D	Illinois 5	Room 2083
Amata Coleman Radewagen	R	American Samoa at-large	Room 2001
Jamie Raskin	D	Maryland 8	Room 2242
Guy Reschenthaler	R	Pennsylvania 14	Room 2209
Hal Rogers	R	Kentucky 5	Room 2406
Mike Rogers	R	Alabama 3	Room 2469
John Rose	R	Tennessee 6	Room 2238
David Rouzer	R	North Carolina 7	Room 2333
Raul Ruiz	D	California 25	Room 2342
Maria Elvira Salazar	R	Florida 27	Room 2162
Linda Sánchez	D	California 38	Room 2309
Jan Schakowsky	D	Illinois 9	Room 2408
Austin Scott	R	Georgia 8	Room 2185
Bobby Scott	D	Virginia 3	Room 2328
Pete Sessions	R	Texas 17	Room 2204
Brad Sherman	D	California 32	Room 2365
Mike Simpson	R	Idaho 2	Room 2084
Adam Smith	D	Washington 9	Room 2264
Chris Smith	R	New Jersey 4	Room 2373
Darren Soto	D	Florida 9	Room 2353
Elise Stefanik	R	New York 21	Room 2211
Greg Steube	R	Florida 17	Room 2457
Haley Stevens	D	Michigan 11	Room 2411
Mark Takano	D	California 39	Room 2078
Claudia Tenney	R	New York 24	Room 2230
Bennie Thompson	D	Mississippi 2	Room 2466
Dina Titus	D	Nevada 1	Room 2370
Rashida Tlaib	D	Michigan 12	Room 2438
Paul Tonko	D	New York 20	Room 2269
Norma Torres	D	California 35	Room 2227
Lori Trahan	D	Massachusetts 3	Room 2233
Mike Turner	R	Ohio 10	Room 2183
Lauren Underwood	D	Illinois 14	Room 2228
David Valadao	D	California 22	Room 2465
Jeff Van Drew	R	New Jersey 2	Room 2447
Matt Van Epps	R	Tennessee 7	Room 2446
Juan Vargas	D	California 52	Room 2467
Marc Veasey	D	Texas 33	Room 2186
Nydia Velázquez	D	New York 7	Room 2302
Ann Wagner	D	Missouri 2	Room 2350
Tim Walberg	R	Michigan 5	Room 2266
James Walkinshaw	D	Virginia 11	Room 2265
Maxine Waters	D	California 43	Room 2221
Daniel Webster	R	Florida 10	Room 2184
Roger Williams	R	Texas 25	Room 2336
Frederica Wilson	D	Florida 24	Room 2080
Rob Wittman	R	Virginia 1	Room 2055
Steve Womack	R	Arkansas 3	Room 2412

== See also ==
- Congressional office buildings
- Cannon House Office Building
- Ford House Office Building
- Longworth House Office Building
