= St. Paul's Lutheran Church (Washington, D.C.) =

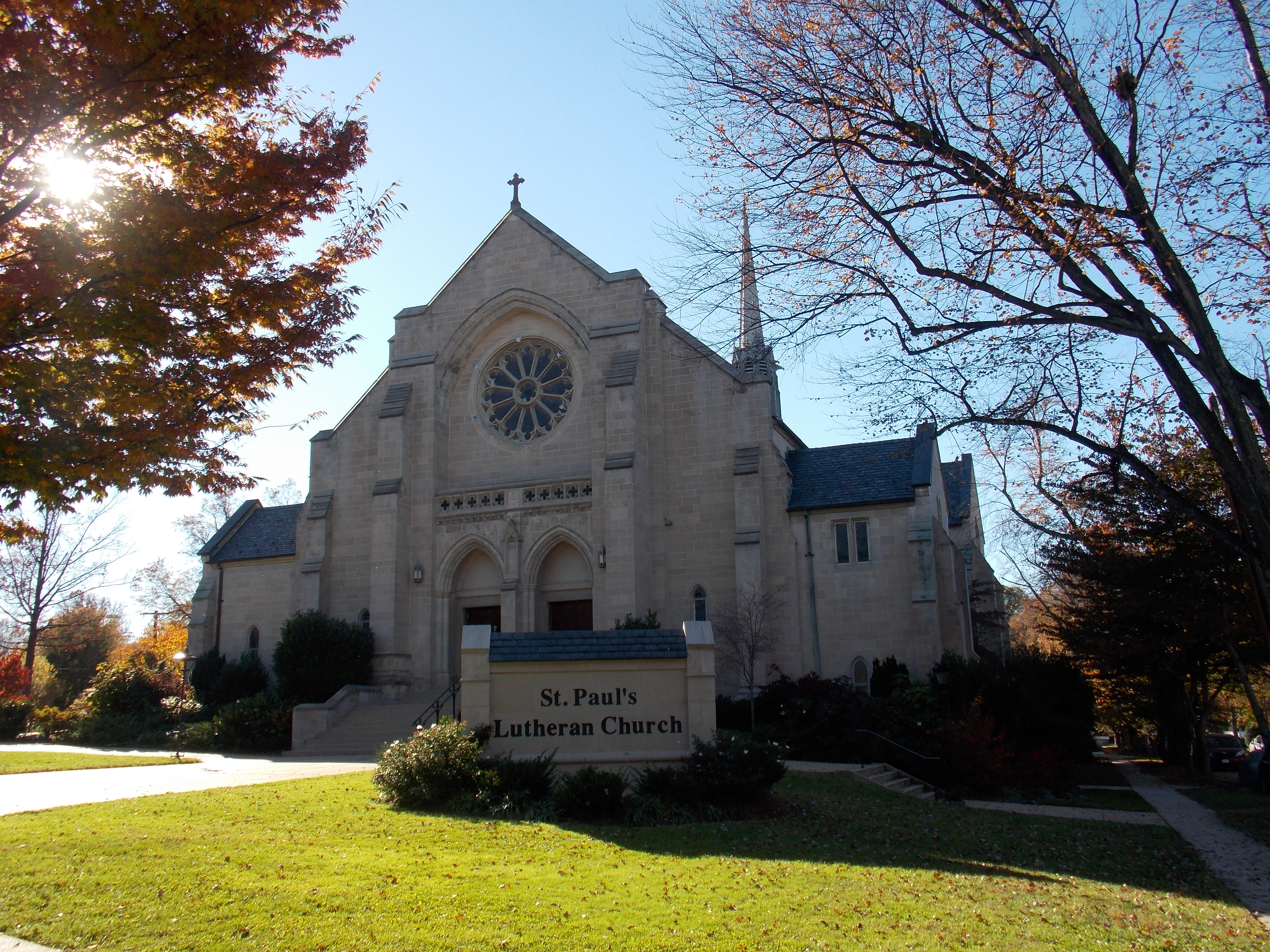
- St. Paul's from 36th Street NW in 2015
- St. Paul's Lutheran Church
- 38.953768°N 77.070089°W
- Location: Washington, D.C.
- Country: United States
- Denomination: Evangelical Lutheran Church in America
- Tradition: Mainline Lutheran
- Website: stpaulslutherandc.com

History
- Founded: April 15, 1843
- Earlier dedication: October 1, 1848

Architecture
- Functional status: Active
- Style: Gothic Revival
- Groundbreaking: June 15, 1930
- Completed: January 12, 1958

Clergy
- Pastor: Andrea L. Walker

St. Paul's Lutheran Church is a decorated Gothic Revival-style Lutheran church in northwest Washington, D.C. Currently located off of Connecticut Avenue NW, between Ellicott and Everett Streets, it was originally founded in 1843 as the first English-speaking Lutheran church in the District. St. Paul's is affiliated with the Evangelical Lutheran Church in America.

== History ==
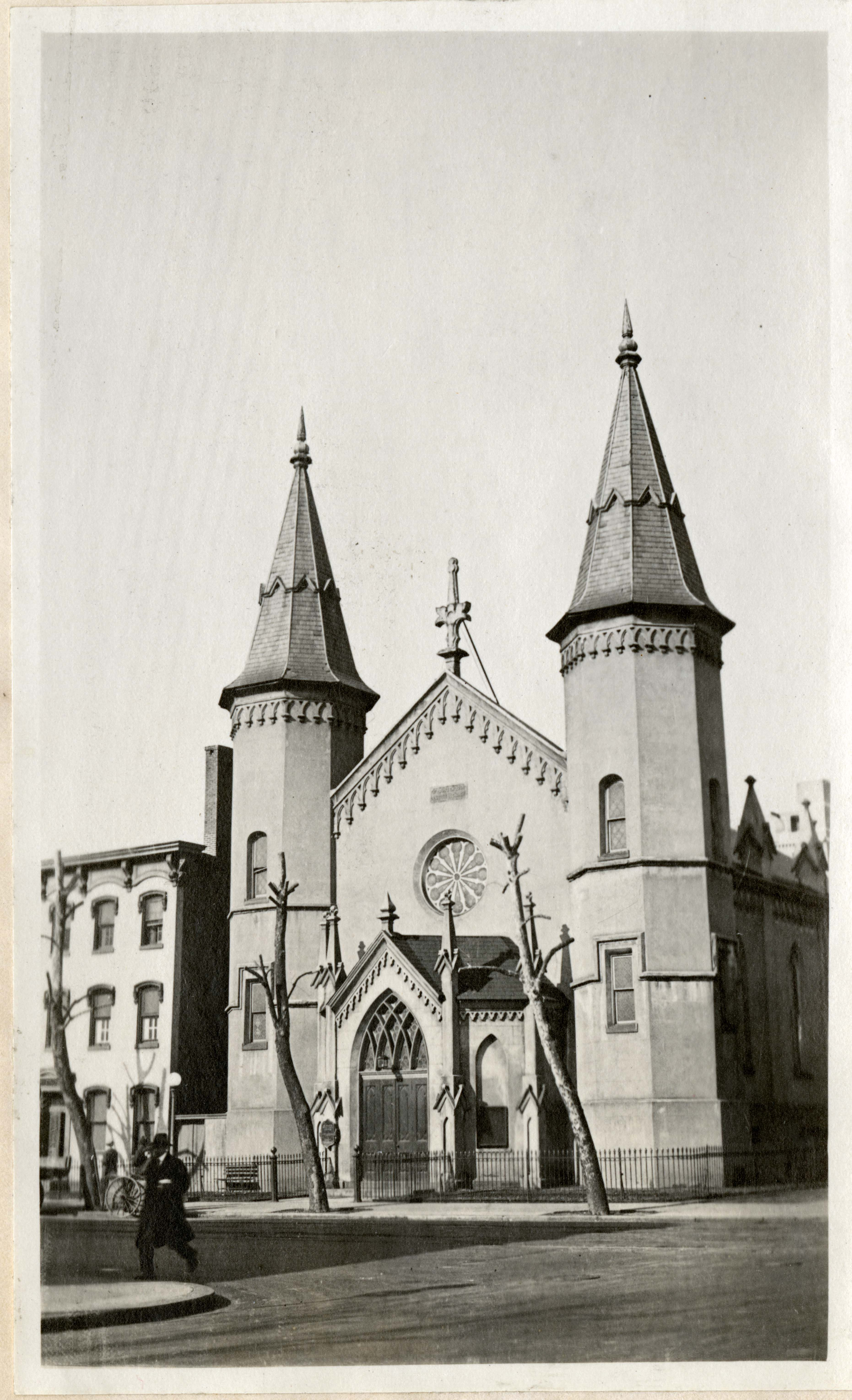
The original St. Paul's church building, circa 1922

The land for St. Paul's original church building on the southwest corner of 11th and H Streets NW was donated by John Peter Van Ness. Van Ness and former President John Quincy Adams were present at the laying of the cornerstone in 1844, and President James K. Polk and Secretary of State James Buchanan were present for the church's dedication in 1848.

In 1926, the Evangelical Lutheran Church of the Epiphany, 16th and U Streets NW, merged with St. Paul's. Agreeing to keep the St. Paul's name and charter, they planned to erect a new church building on a plot owned by Epiphany at 4900 Connecticut Avenue NW. It was completed in 1958.

The Peter Muhlenberg Memorial, situated in front of the church, was built using private funds on land St. Paul's donated to the federal government.

== See also ==
- Evangelical Lutheran Church in America
