= PECO Building =

Skyscraper in Philadelphia

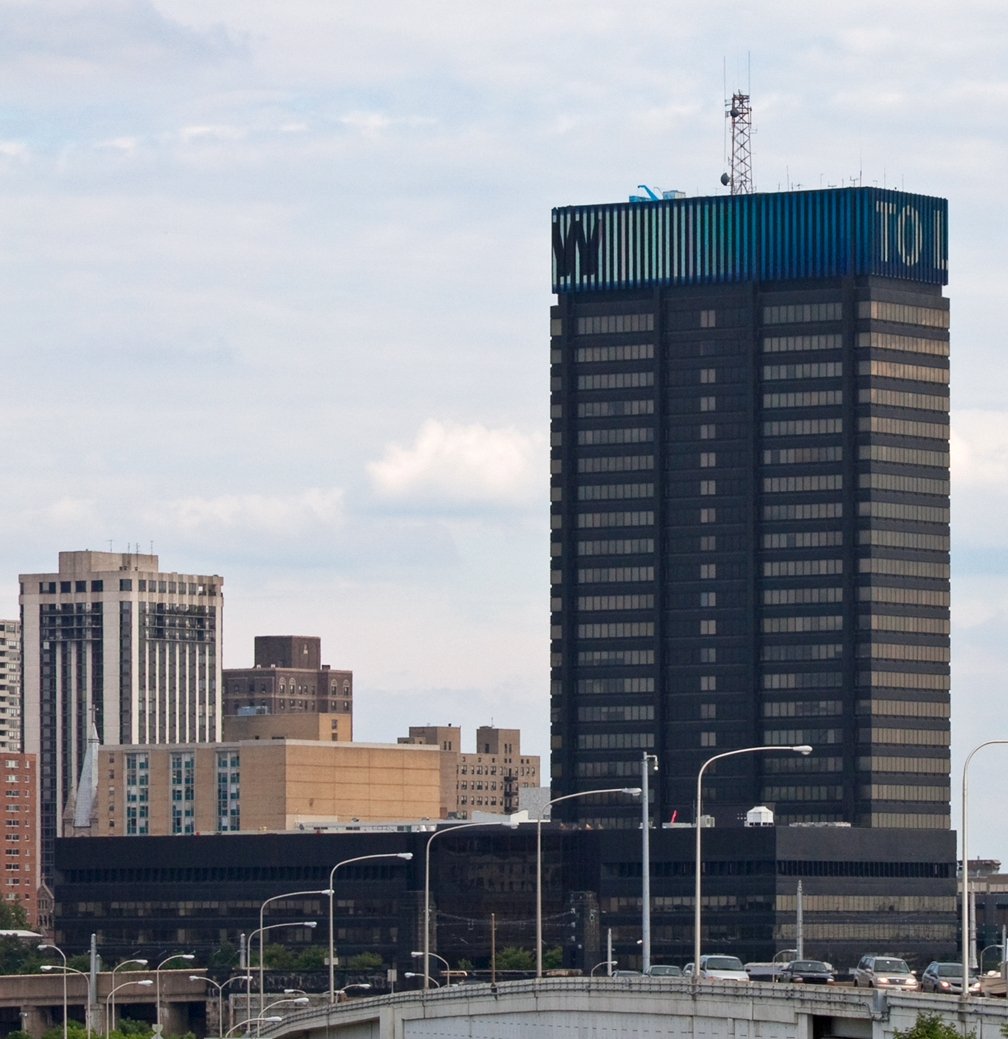
- PECO Building the day after the new crown lights were activated.

- Location within Philadelphia PECO Building (Pennsylvania) PECO Building (the United States)

General information
- Type: office
- Location: 2301 Market Street, Philadelphia, Pennsylvania, United States
- Coordinates: 39.9545°N 75.1787°W
- Construction started: 1916
- Completed: 1970
- Owner: PECO Energy Company

Height
- Roof: 384 ft (117 m)

Technical details
- Floor count: 27

Design and construction
- Architect: Harbeson, Hough, Livingston & Larson

The PECO Building is a modernist office highrise in Center City Philadelphia. The building is the current headquarters of the PECO Energy Company, formerly the Philadelphia Energy Company (PECo), and one of the companies that merged to form the Exelon Corporation. The building lies adjacent to the Schuylkill River, extends 27 stories tall, and has the address of 2301 Market Street, Philadelphia, PA 19103.

== Overview ==
The Building consists of two conjoined buildings designed by architects Harbeson, Hough, Livingston & Larson. The North building has a height of 96 feet and a length of 380 feet and a width of 196 feet. The south has a height of 384 feet and a length of 165 and a width of 67 feet. The North building was built in 1916 and the South building was completed in 1970. The PECO Building is notable for its electronic display, formally called the Crown Lights, which displays news and a variety of other community messages.

== Crown Lights ==
The Crown Lights have been displaying messages atop the structure since July 4, 1976. The original electronic message board consisted of a total of 2,600 individual amber-colored bulbs which displayed scrolling text around the top of the building. At midnight on January 1, 2009, the lights were shut down and replaced with a more energy efficient and full color LED-based system which went live on July 4, 2009. In November 2020 the lights were upgraded once more, after being dark for four months. The new display's pixel density was improved from 25 to 39 pixels per inch. The display is 38 feet high, 148 feet long along the North and South side of the building, and 71 feet long along the East and West side.
