= Engine Company 31 =

Historic place in Washington DC, United States

- U.S. National Register of Historic Places
- D.C. Inventory of Historic Sites
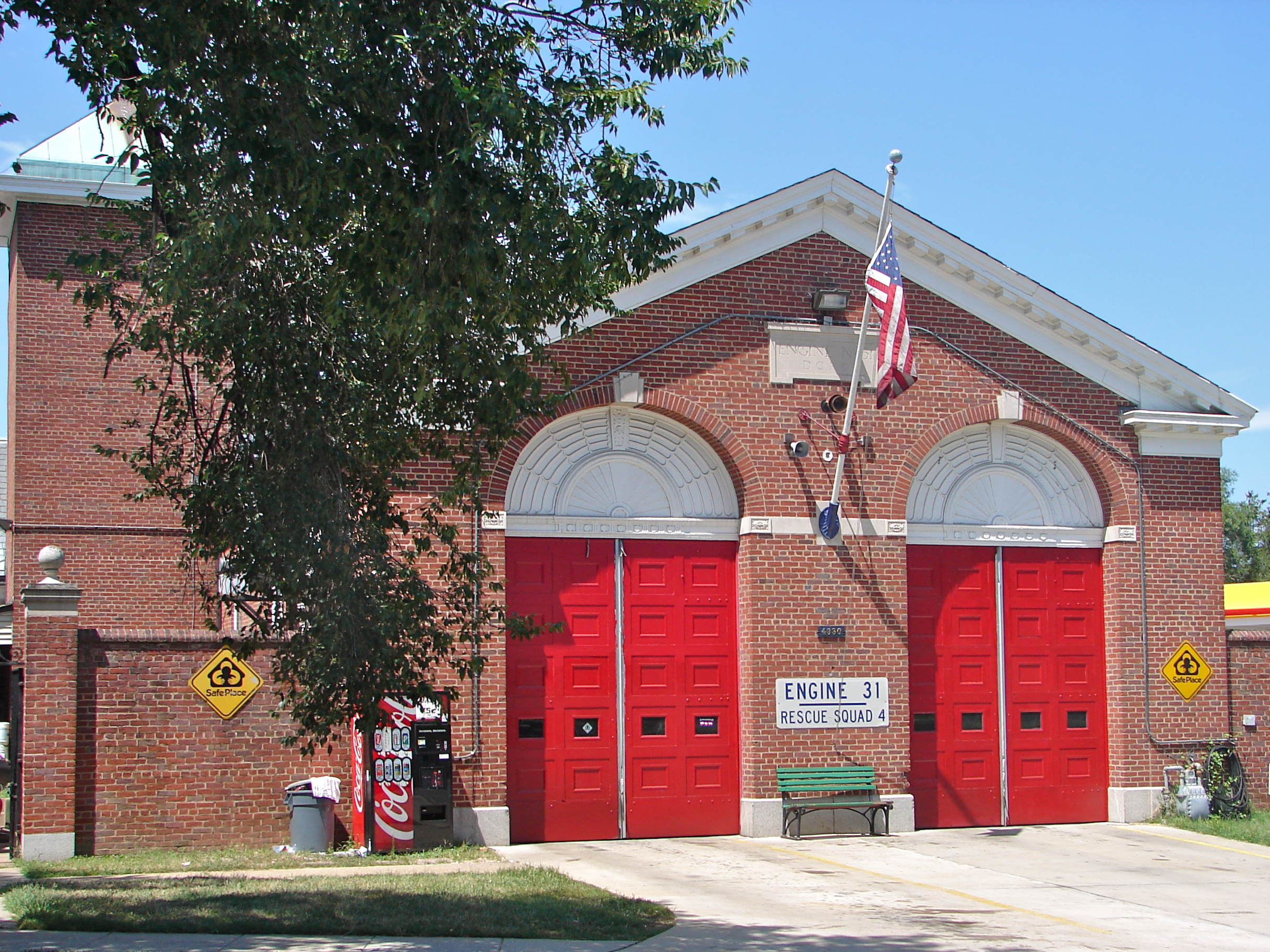
- Engine Company 31 building (2011)

- Location within District of Columbia
- Location: 4930 Connecticut Avenue NW, Washington, D.C., U.S.
- Coordinates: 38°57′16″N 77°04′10″W
- Built: 1930
- Architect: Albert L. Harris
- MPS: Firehouses in Washington DC MPS
- NRHP reference No.: 11000285

Significant dates
- Added to NRHP: May 18, 2011
- Designated DCIHS: January 27, 2011

Engine Company 31, also known as the Forest Hills Firehouse, is a fire station and an historic structure located in the Wakefield neighborhood in Washington, D.C. It was listed on both the DC Inventory of Historic Sites and on the National Register of Historic Places in 2011. The brick building was designed by Albert L. Harris and built in 1931.
