= Wakefield (Washington, D.C.) =

- Neighborhood of Washington, D.C.
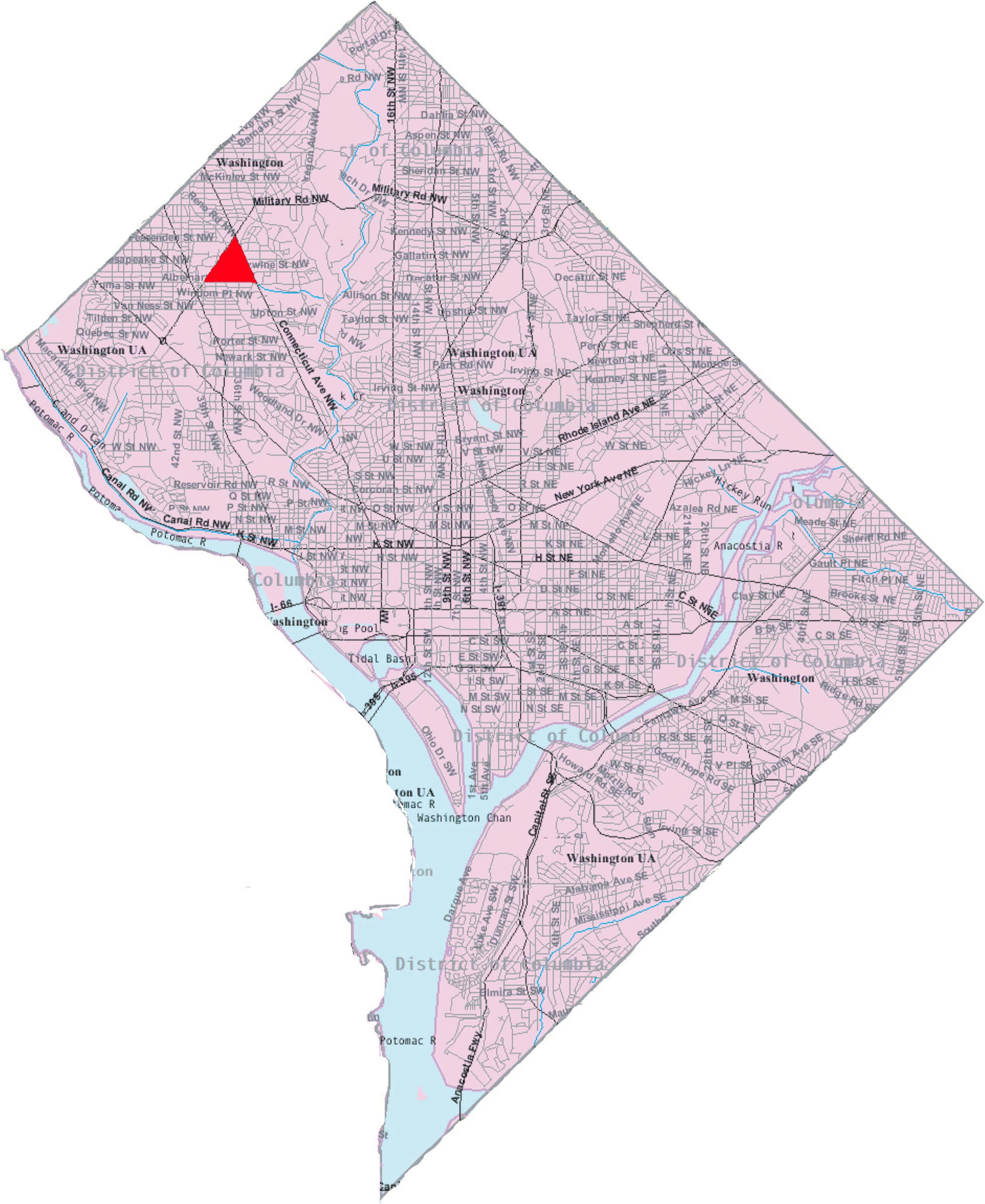
- Map of Washington, D.C., with Wakefield highlighted in red
- Coordinates: 38°56′58.89″N 077°04′17.61″W
- Country: United States
- District: Washington, D.C.
- Ward: Ward 3

Government
  - Councilmember: Matthew Frumin
  - ANC Commissioner: Malachy Nugent
- Postal code: ZIP code

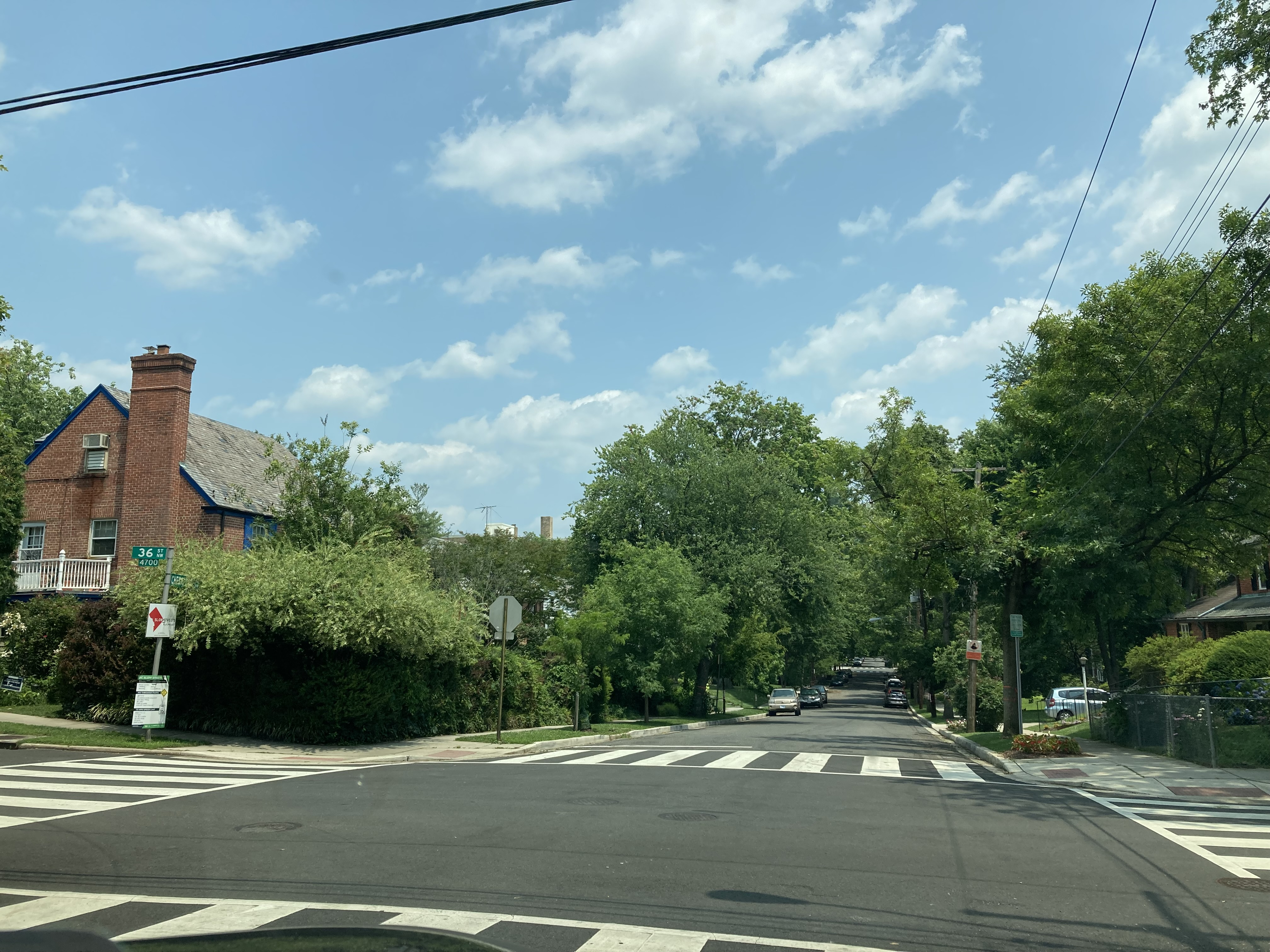
Intersection of Chesapeake St. and 36th St. NW, July 2021, in Wakefield

Wakefield is a neighborhood in the Upper Northwest quadrant of Washington, D.C., bounded by Albemarle Street NW to the south, Nebraska Avenue NW to the west, and Connecticut Avenue to the east. It is served by the Van Ness-UDC and Tenleytown-AU station on the Washington Metro's Red Line.

The area was first developed in the 1930s by R.B. Warren, who built 100 brick homes between Nebraska and Connecticut north of Albemarle and named the new neighborhood "Wakefield", after the plantation where George Washington was born. This new residential development was part of, and contributed to, the burgeoning growth along Connecticut Avenue. To support the growing population in Wakefield and surrounding neighborhoods, a Piggly Wiggly grocery store was built in 1928 on the west side of Connecticut Ave just south of Albemarle St, and the Chevy Chase Park N' Shop — the first modern shopping center and sports complex in the area, with an A&P, Peoples, Woolworth's, Best's, an ice skating rink, and a bowling alley — was built in 1938 on the east side of the same block.

Wakefield remains a residential enclave today, in close proximity to the commercial centers at Van Ness, Tenleytown, and Chevy Chase, DC. The neighborhood also includes a public school, Ben W. Murch Elementary School, and a fire house, DC Engine Company 31, both built and placed into service in 1930.

In May, 2014, the Washington Post reported that Wakefield had become one of the most popular neighborhoods in Washington, D.C. according to the real-estate listing service MRIS. Homes in Wakefield appreciated more than any other neighborhood in the District in the 12 months to July 2015, up 42 percent from $573,433 to $814,045.
