= H2L2 =

American architecture firm

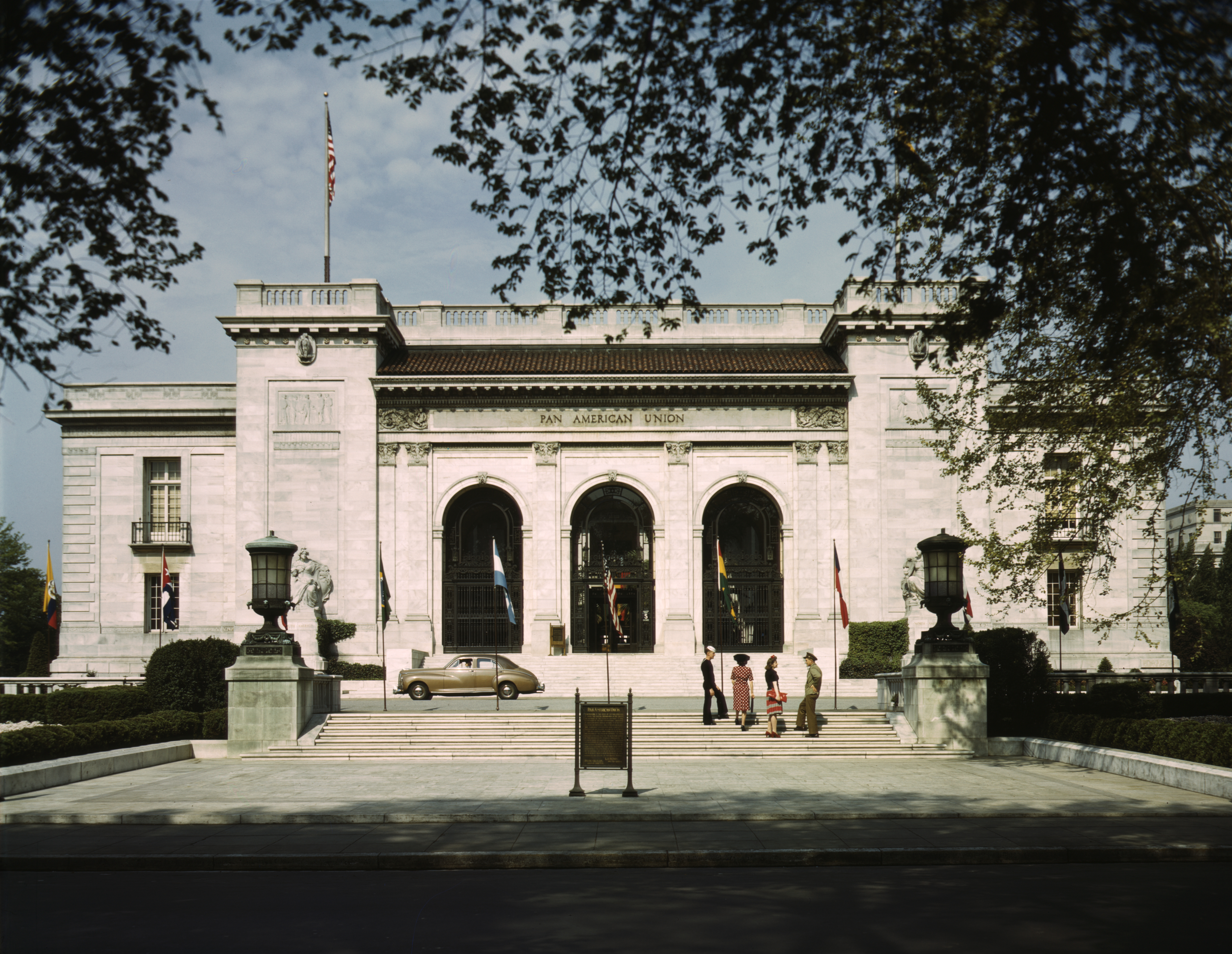
OAS Building (1910)

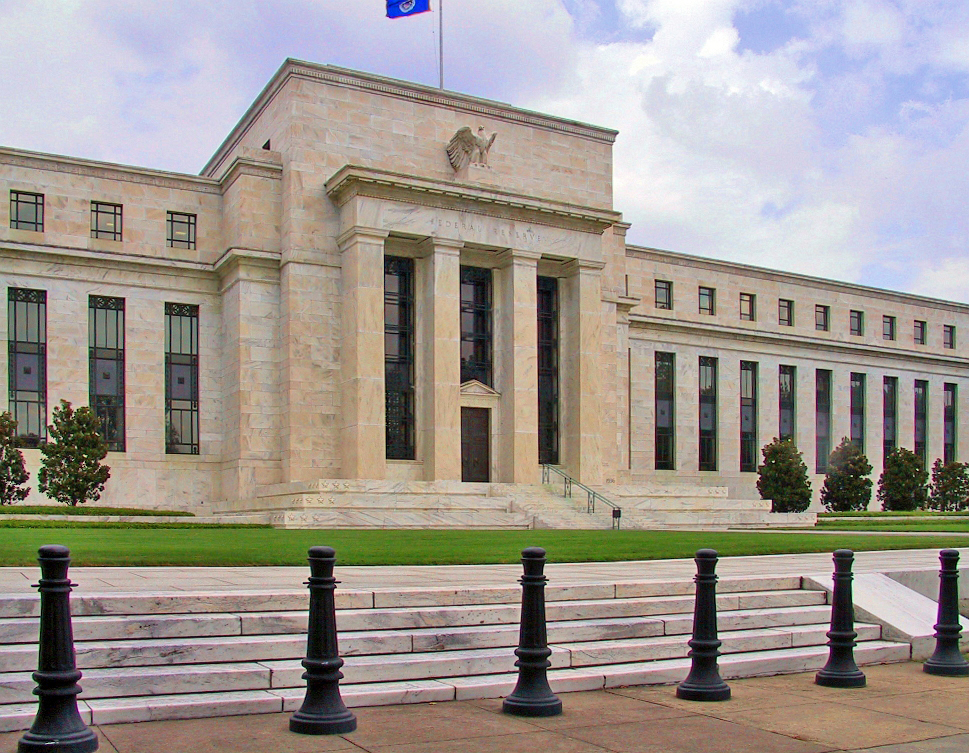
Eccles Building (1935)

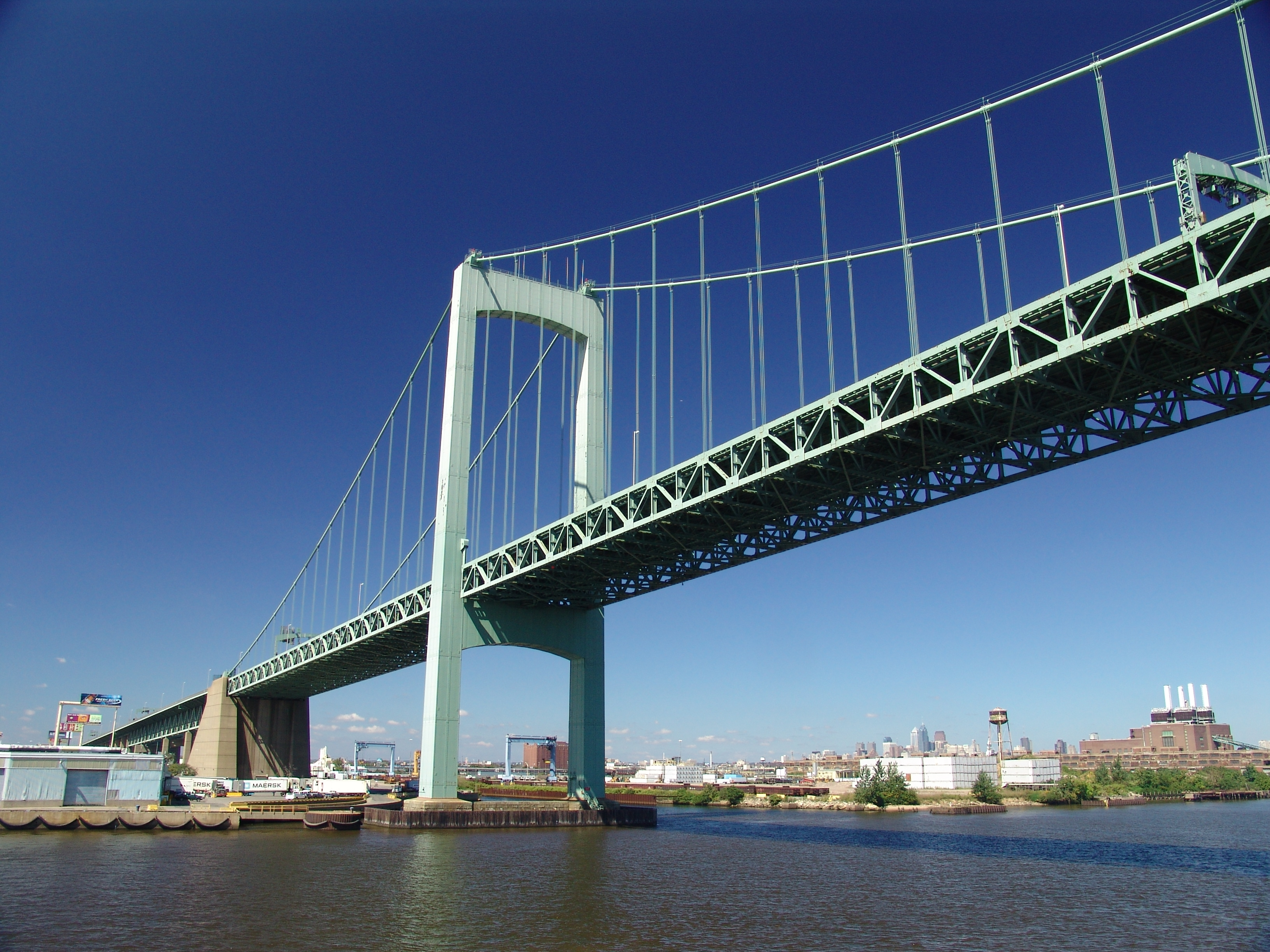
Walt Whitman Bridge (1959)

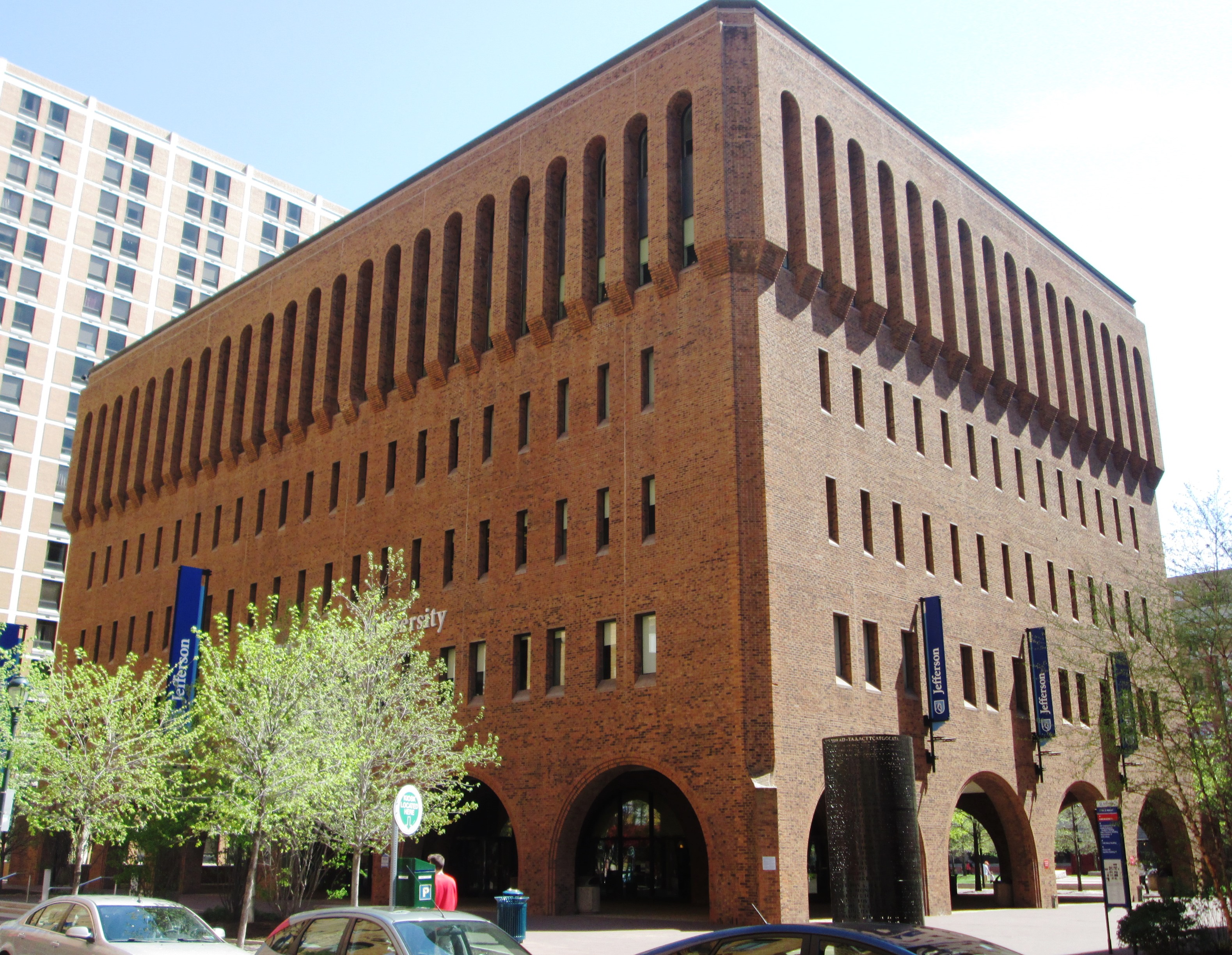
Scott Memorial Library of Thomas Jefferson University (1970)

H2L2 (for three decades, officially Harbeson, Hough, Livingston & Larson) was an architecture firm in Philadelphia founded in 1907 by Paul Philippe Cret as The Offices of Paul Philippe Cret. In 1923, John Harbeson became Cret's partner, along with William J. H. Hough and William Livingston. In 1925 the firm was joined by Roy Larson. After Cret's death in 1945, the younger partners followed Cret's wishes and removed Cret's name from their masthead, continuing as Harbeson, Hough, Livingston & Larson. In 1976, the firm officially became H2L2 after years of using the name informally. In 2012, H2L2 and NELSON, which was founded in 1977 as an interior design firm, merged to create a full-service architecture/engineering firm.

Much of the firm's work is visible in Philadelphia and around the country.

== Major works ==
=== The Offices of Paul Philippe Cret ===
- 1910 – Organization of American States Building, Washington, DC (with Albert Kelsey)
- 1913 – Indianapolis Central Public Library, Indianapolis, Indiana (with Zantzinger, Borie and Medary)
- 1921 – Detroit Institute of Arts, Detroit, Michigan (with Zantzinger, Borie and Medary)
- 1923 – Barnes Foundation, Merion, Pennsylvania
- 1926 – Rodin Museum, Philadelphia, Pennsylvania (with Jacques Gréber
- 1926 – Benjamin Franklin Bridge, Philadelphia – Camden, New Jersey
- 1929 – Clark Memorial Bridge, Louisville, Kentucky
- 1929 – Integrity Trust Company Building, Philadelphia
- 1932 – Folger Shakespeare Library, Washington D.C.
- 1935 – Duke Ellington Bridge, Washington D.C.
- 1937 – Eccles Building, Washington D.C.
- 1944 – Bancroft Hall, USNA, Annapolis, Maryland

=== Harbeson, Hough, Livingston & Larson ===
- 1944 – Normandy American Cemetery and Memorial, Colleville-sur-Mer, Normandy, France
- 1956 – Eisenhower Chapel, Penn State University, State College, Pennsylvania
- 1957 – Walt Whitman Bridge, Philadelphia, Pennsylvania
- 1958 - Welsh Valley Middle School, Narberth, Pennsylvania
- 1963 – Thomas Jefferson University, General Plan, Philadelphia
- 1965 – Rayburn House Office Building, Washington, DC
- 1970 – Thomas Jefferson University, Scott Memorial Library, Philadelphia
- 1970 – PECO Building, Philadelphia
- 1972 – Children's Hospital of Philadelphia, Philadelphia
- 1972 - University City High School (Philadelphia)
- 1976 – Hetzel Student Union, Penn State University, State College
- 1976 - Congregation Mikveh Israel, Philadelphia
