= John Harbeson =

American architect (1888–1986)

John Frederick Harbeson (30 July 1888 – 21 December 1986) was a rational classicist Philadelphia architect and a long-time architecture professor at the University of Pennsylvania. He was a principal in the Philadelphia design firm, Harbeson, Hough, Livingston & Larson, successors to the office of Paul Cret.

Harbeson received a B.S. in Architecture from the University of Pennsylvania in 1910, and received an M.S. in Architecture the following year. During the summers while he was in school, Harbeson worked for architect John T. Windrim. After graduation, he joined Kelsey and Cret to work on the design of the Pan-American Union Building in Washington, DC. In 1923 Harbeson became Cret's partner, along with William J. H. Hough and William Livingston. In 1925 the firm was joined by Roy Larson. After Cret's death in 1945, the younger partners followed Cret's wishes and removed Cret's name from their masthead, continuing as Harbeson, Hough, Livingston, Larson.

Harbeson is best known for his teaching at the University of Pennsylvania and respectively as one of the main teachers of the later seminal architect Louis Kahn. He served as Chair of the University's Department of Architecture from 1927 to 1935 and as Acting Dean of the School of Fine Arts at the University from 1929 to 1930.

In the early to mid-1920s, Harbeson authored a series of articles in the architectural journal, Pencil Points, on the Beaux-Arts method of architectural education (as coordinated through the Beaux-Arts Institute of Design). In 1926 these articles were published as a book, The Study of Architectural Design: With Special Reference to the Program of the Beaux-Arts Institute of Design.

Harbeson's design work was not limited to architecture. He was one of the primary designers working with the Budd Company on the Burlington's Pioneer Zephyr in 1934. Drawing on his Pioneer Zephyr experience, in 1936 he led the firm through the design project of the Burlington's Denver Zephyr.

Harbeson was elected a Fellow of the American Institute of Architects in 1934. In 1955 he was elected into the National Academy of Design as an Associate member, and became a full Academician in 1957. He served as President of the Academy from 1959 to 1962.
