= List of public art in Washington, D.C., Ward 3 =

This is a list of public art in Ward 3 of Washington, D.C.

This list applies only to works of public art accessible in an outdoor public space. For example, this does not include artwork visible inside a museum.

Most of the works mentioned are sculptures. When this is not the case (i.e. sound installation, for example) it is stated next to the title.

Title	Artist	Year	Location/GPS Coordinates	Material	Dimensions	Owner	Image
Limestone Aztec Eagles	Joseph Younger	1931	Kennedy-Warren Apartment Building 38°55′54″N 77°3′21″W	Limestone		BF Saul Properties	
Sedgewood Garden Architectural Sculptures	M. Mestribian	c. 1932	Sedgewick Garden Apartments, 3726 Connecticut Ave., N.W.				
Kahlil Gibran	Gordon Kray	1990	3100 Massachusetts Ave N.W.	Bronze, Marble, Limestone & Granite	Overall: approx. 4.5 ft. × 30 ft. × 5 ft. (5 tons).	United States Department of the Interior & Kahlil Gibran Memorial Foundation	
Statue of Winston Churchill	William McVey	1965	British Embassy	Bronze & Granite	Sculpture: approx. 7 × 3.5 × 6 ft.; Base: approx. 1.5 × 6 × 7 ft.	English-Speaking Union	
Medallions	Unknown	1928	PNC Bank, 5530 Connecticut Ave, N.W.	Stone	4 relief medallions. Each: approx. D. 3 in. Diam. 3 ft.	PNC Financial Services	
Behrend Menorah	Saunders Schultz	1984	Washington Hebrew Congregation, 3935 Macomb St., N.W. 38°56′02″N 77°4′47″W	Polished stainless steel & Stone	Sculpture: approx. 26 × 28 × 28 ft.; Base: approx. Diam. 20 ft.	Washington Hebrew Congregation	
Havets Metamorfoser	Joannes Knut Steen	1986	Norwegian Chancery	Concrete & Stone	Relief: approx. 5 ft. × 23 ft. × 24 in.; Support wall: approx. 8 ft. × 32 ft. × 3½ ft.	Embassy of Norway	
Four Modes of Modern Travel	Leon Hermant	1935	Duke Ellington Bridge	Limestone	4 panels. Each: H. 3 ft. W. 4 ft.		
(Embassy of Israel Abstract)	Yechiel Shemi	1980	Embassy of Israel	Metal	approx. 8 × 16 × 8 ft.	Embassy of Israel	
Llamas	Una Hanbury		2812 Connecticut Ave., N.W. 38°55′37″N 77°3′14″W	Concrete	2 llamas. Each: approx. H. 2½ ft.		
Peter Muhlenberg Memorial	Caroline M. Hufford	1980	Muhlenberg Park	Bronze	Sculpture: approx. H. 4 ft. W. 4 ft.; Base: approx. 8 ft. 2 in. × 7 ft. × 5 ft. 9 in.	United States Department of the Interior	
Christ	Leo Friedlander	1960	Wesley Theological Seminary	Indiana Limestone	Sculpture: approx. H. 16 ft.	Wesley Theological Seminary	
Pan	Edith Barretto Stevens Parsons		Washington National Cathedral	Metal	Sculpture: approx. 19 × 9 × 10 in.; Base: approx. 4 × 10 × 13.5 in.	Washington National Cathedral	
South Portal Figures	Enrique Monjo	1966–1971	Washington National Cathedral	Limestone	44 archivolt figures. 8 jamb figures. Each archivolt figure: H. 2 ft.	Washington National Cathedral	
Archangel Gabriel	Granville Carter		Washington National Cathedral			Washington National Cathedral	
St. Alban	Heinz Warneke	1961	Washington National Cathedral	Limestone	4 ft. 10 in.	Washington National Cathedral	
Darth Vader grotesque	Jay Hall Carpenter	c. 1980	Washington National Cathedral	Limestone		Washington National Cathedral	
The Last Supper	Heinz Warneke	1959	Washington National Cathedral 38°55′50″N 77°4′14″W	Limestone		Washington National Cathedral	
The Prodigal Son	Heinz Warneke	1961	Washington National Cathedral	Granite	Sculpture: approx. 50 × 34 × 25 in.; Base: approx. 19 × 4 × 33 in.	Washington National Cathedral	
The Garth Fountain	George Tsutakawa	1968	Washington National Cathedral	Silicon bronze	Approx. 9 ft. × 3 ft. × 17 in.; Pool diam: approx. 16 ft.	Washington National Cathedral	
George Washington on Horseback	Herbert Haseltine	1959	Washington National Cathedral	Gilded bronze	Sculpture: approx. 6½ × 12½ × 5½ ft.; Base: approx. 17 × 12½ × 5½ ft.	Washington National Cathedral	
Untitled	Kendall Buster	1992	2651 Woodley Rd., N.W.	Brass, Copper, Wood	Sculpture: approx. H. 5 ft. 3 in. Diam: 7 ft. 7 in.; Base: approx. H. 3 in. Diam. 7 ft. 5 in.	Anthony Podesta	
Hop To It!	Kim Shaklee	1999	National Zoological Park	Bronze		Smithsonian Institution	
American Bald Eagle	David H. Turner	1995	National Zoological Park – Outside of Bird House	Bronze		Smithsonian Institution	
Michael de Kovats	Paul Takacs	c. 2003	Hungarian Embassy	Brass		Hungarian Embassy	
Pelzman Memorial Glockenspiel	Ivy A. Pelzman	1976	National Zoological Park			Smithsonian Institution	
Fishbone	Brooke Lamm		National Zoological Park	Steel		Smithsonian Institution	
Sloth Bear	Priscilla Diechmann		National Zoological Park – At the Sloth Bear exhibit.	Bronze		Smithsonian Institution	
Panda	Eric Berg		National Zoological Park – Near Panda and Otters.	Bronze		Smithsonian Institution	
Otters	Priscilla Diechmann		National Zoological Park	Bronze		Smithsonian Institution	
(Hippo with Bird)			National Zoological Park	Bronze		Smithsonian Institution – Pond by Bird House	
Prairie Dogs			National Zoological Park			Smithsonian Institution	
Uncle Beazley	Louis Paul Jonas	1967	National Zoological Park – Near Lemur Island 38°55′44″N 77°2′52″W	Fiberglass		Smithsonian Institution	
Happy Frog	William McVey	1975	National Zoological Park – Outside of the Lizard House 38°55′46″N 77°2′52″W	Bronze & Concrete	Sculpture without artist's base: approx. 35½ × 24½ × 38 in. (90.2 × 62.2 × 96.5 cm.); Sculpture with artist's base: approx. 42 × 23 × 39 in. (200 lbs).	Smithsonian Institution	
Eagle	Adolph Weinman	1908–1910	National Zoological Park – Outside of the Bird House		Sculpture: approx. 59 × 72 × 75 in. (5,700 lbs.).	Smithsonian Institution	
The Gathering	Bart Walter		National Zoological Park – Garden near the Think Tank	Bronze	7 sculptures.	Smithsonian Institution	
Octopus	William Klapp	1985	National Zoological Park – Invertebrae Building	Welded Steel	Approx. 60 × 60 × 24 in.	Smithsonian Institution	
Reptile House Portal	Charles R. Knight & John Joseph Earley	1930–1931	National Zoological Park	Concrete, Mosaic & Limestone		Smithsonian Institution	
Giant Anteater	Erwin Springweiler	1938	National Zoological Park 38°55′49″N 77°2′56″W	Bronze with Green Patina & Concrete	Sculpture: approx. 3 × 5.5 × 6 ft.; Base: approx. 24 × 72 × 24 in.	Smithsonian Institution	
Entrance Portico	John Joseph Earley	1931	National Zoological Park 38°55′47″N 77°2′51″W	Concrete, Marble, Wood, Brass	H. 25–40 ft.	Smithsonian Institution	
Wrestling Bears	Heinz Warneke	c. 1935	National Zoological Park	Red Granite or Cast Stone	Sculpture: approx. 3 ft. × 36 in. × 43 in.; Base: approx. H. 12 in.	Smithsonian Institution	
Bear Cub	Jacob Lipkin		National Zoological Park	Italian Porphyry	26 × 40 × 16 in.	Smithsonian Institution	
Orang	William Klapp	1987–1988	National Zoological Park	Fiberglass		Smithsonian Institution	
Arched Frieze with Decorative Heads	John Joseph Earley	1931	National Zoological Park 38°55′49″N 77°2′56″W	Concrete		Smithsonian Institution	
Bear	Cornelia Van Auken Chapin	1952	National Zoological Park 38°55′47″N 77°2′50″W	Volcanic Rock	Sculpture: approx. H. 2 ft.; Base: approx. 15 × 17 × 36 in.	Smithsonian Institution	
Elephant Fountain	Jimilu Mason	1990	National Zoological Park 38°55′47″N 77°3′03″W	Bronze	Approx. 60 × 45 × 25 in.	Smithsonian Institution	
Flight	Jack S. Chase	1990	National Zoological Park	Cor-Ten Steel	Three mobiles. Each goose: approx. L. 36 in. × W. 24 in.	Smithsonian Institution	
Bear Cubs	Laura Swing Kemeys	1907	National Zoological Park		3 bears. Each sculpture: approx. H. 2½ ft.	Smithsonian Institution	
Fox Cubs	Laura Swing Kemeys	1907	National Zoological Park 38°55′48″N 77°2′54″W		2 parts. Each sculpture: approx. H. 2½ ft.	Smithsonian Institution	
Iknhaten	Fred Eversley	2004	American University	Bronze	78 × 78 × 78 in.	American University	
Stereope's Cyclops	Jules Olitski	2006	American University	Painted Steel	118 × 106 × 95 in.	American University	
Bronte's Cyclops	Jules Olitski	2006	American University	Painted Steel	108 × 86 × 90 in.	American University	
Argos' Cyclops	Jules Olitski	2006	American University	Painted Steel	102 × 111 × 90 in.	American University	
Eurythmy	Andre Ramseyer	c. 1955	Swiss Embassy	Bronze		Embassy of Switzerland	
John Wesley	Arthur George Walker	1932	Wesley Theological Seminary	Bronze		Wesley Theological Seminary	
