= Edward Kemeys =

American sculptor

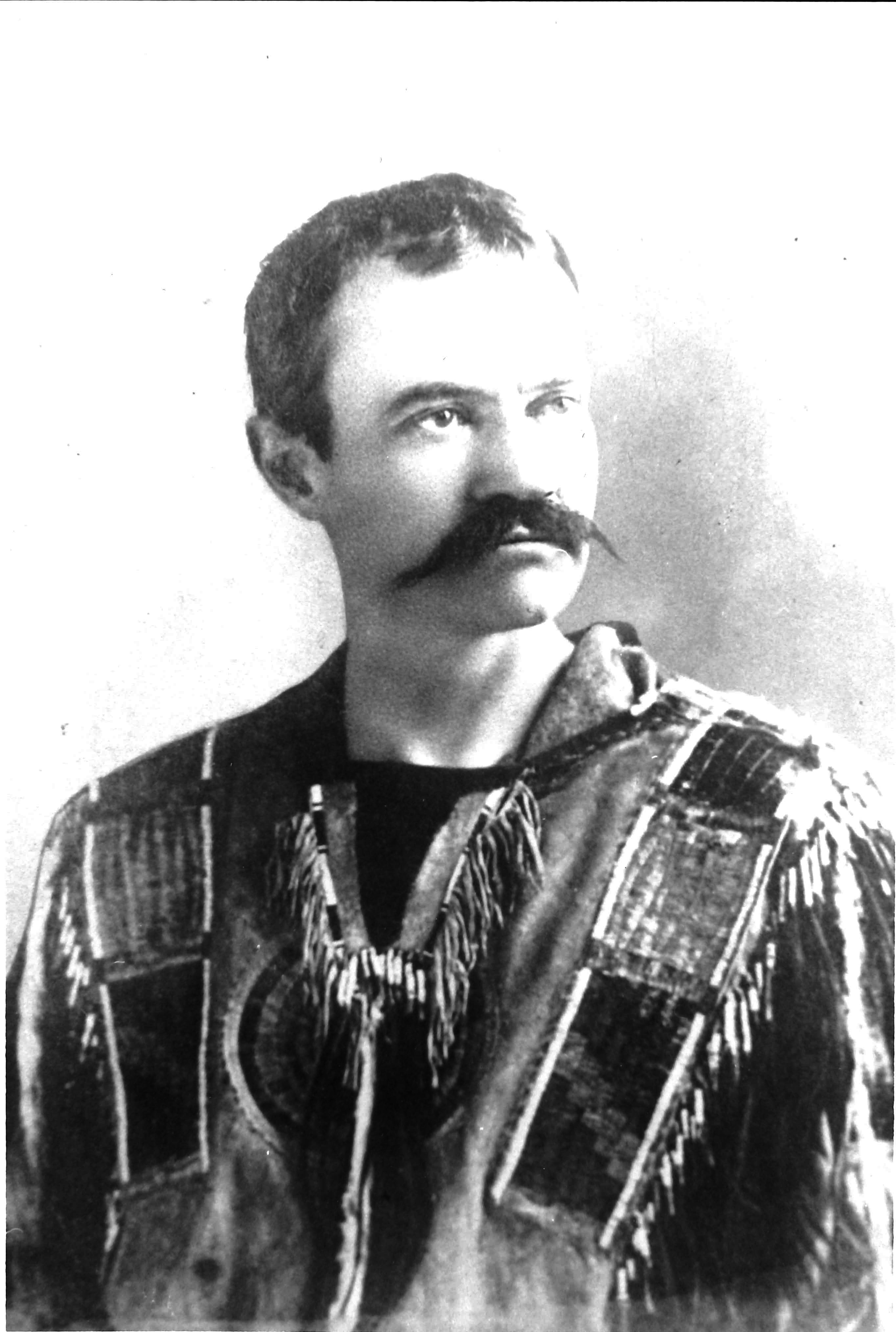
Kemeys in 1898

Edward Kemeys (January 31, 1843 – May 11, 1907) was an American sculptor and considered America's first animalier.

He is best known for his sculptures of animals, particularly the two bronze lions that mark the entrance to the Art Institute of Chicago Building in Chicago. Kemeys was also a captain in the 4th United States Colored Heavy Artillery, Company H, writer, lecturer, and adventurer in the Western United States.

== Early life ==
Kemeys was born on January 31, 1843, in Savannah, Georgia. to Abby Greene of Providence, Rhode Island, and William Kemeys of Scarborough, New York. The Kemeys family lived in Savannah, but moved back to New York City following the death of his mother in 1843.

== Career ==
Kemeys first worked in the iron business of New York City at age 17.

=== Civil War ===
When the American Civil War broke out, Kemeys enlisted at age 19, volunteering for the 65th New York Infantry Regiment. "I served in the Peninsula campaign till I fell sick of fever and was discharged. I went in again later as a second lieutenant," he recalled. Kemeys re-enlisted as a commissioned officer in the 4th United States Colored Heavy Artillery, Company H, where he attained the rank of captain. He resigned his commission in 1866.

=== After the Civil War ===
He studied in New York City and then Paris.

In Paris, he was impressed by the style of Antoine-Louis Barye, although in no sense an imitator. He made a specialty of the wild animals of the American continent. His “Fight between Buffalo and Wolves” attracted attention at the Paris Salon of 1878. Among his other important works are “Panther and Deer,” and “Coyote and Raven.” A colossal head of a buffalo for the facade of the station of the Pacific railroad at St. Louis, Missouri, which was cast in bronze in New York in August, 1887, was the largest work of its kind that had been done in the United States. Another bronze statue of a panther named "Still Hunt," is permanently situated on a rock flanking East Drive in Central Park in New York City.

Kemeys died in Washington, D.C., on May 11, 1907. He and his wife, Laura Swing Kemeys (also an artist), are buried in Arlington National Cemetery.

== Gallery ==
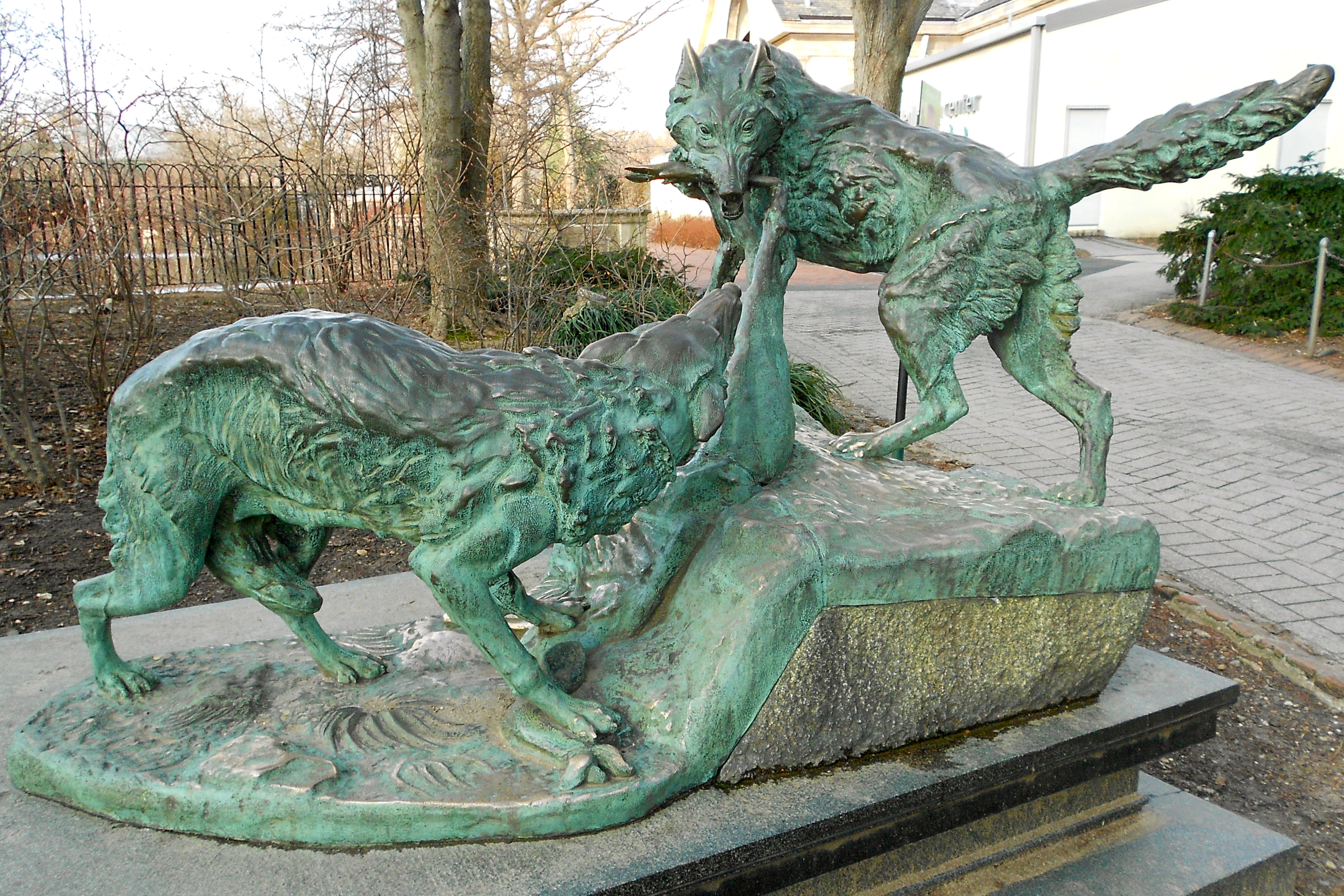
Hudson Bay Wolves, 1873, at the Philadelphia Zoo in Philadelphia

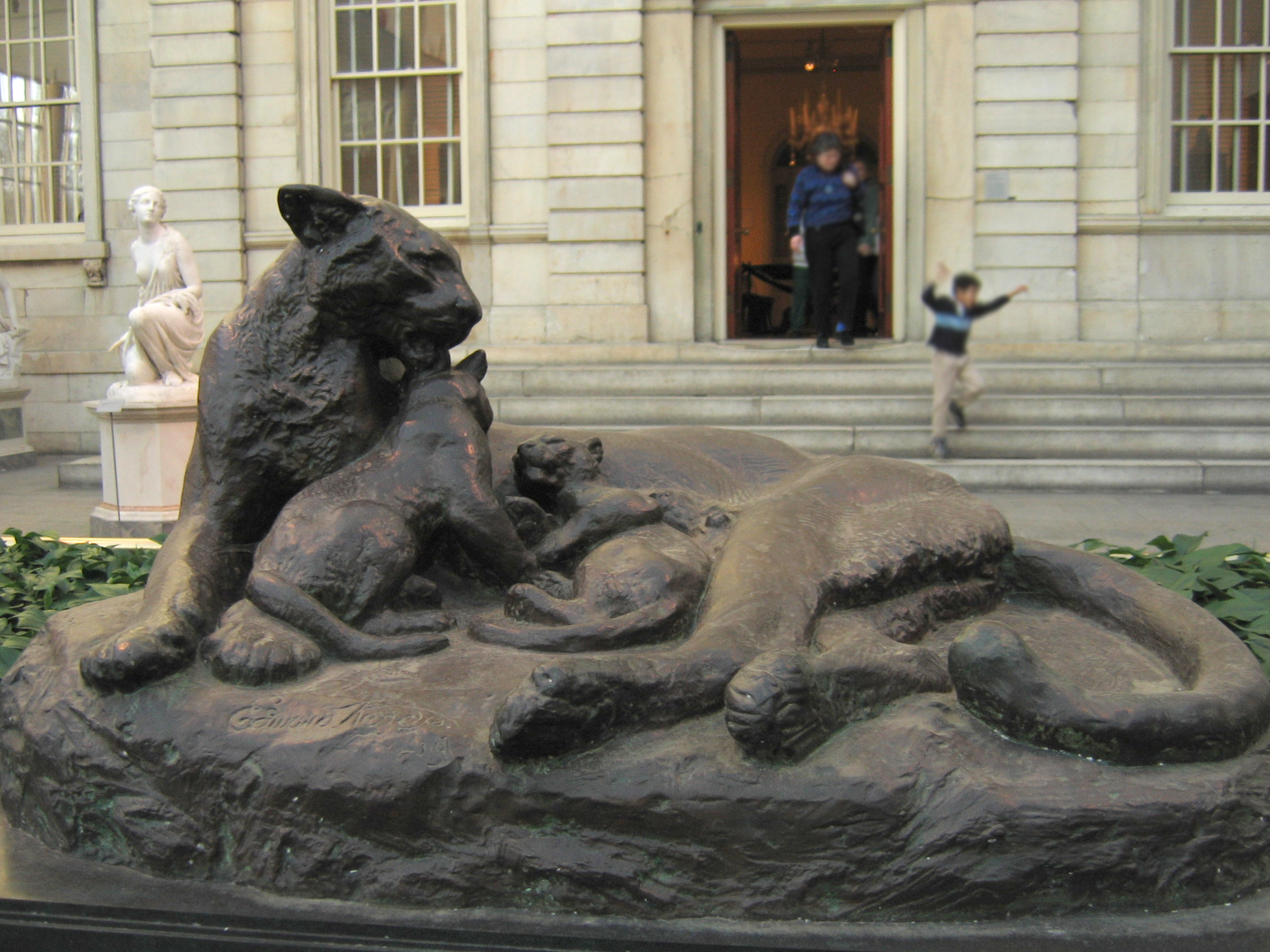
Panther and Cubs, c. 1878, at the Metropolitan Museum of Art in New York City

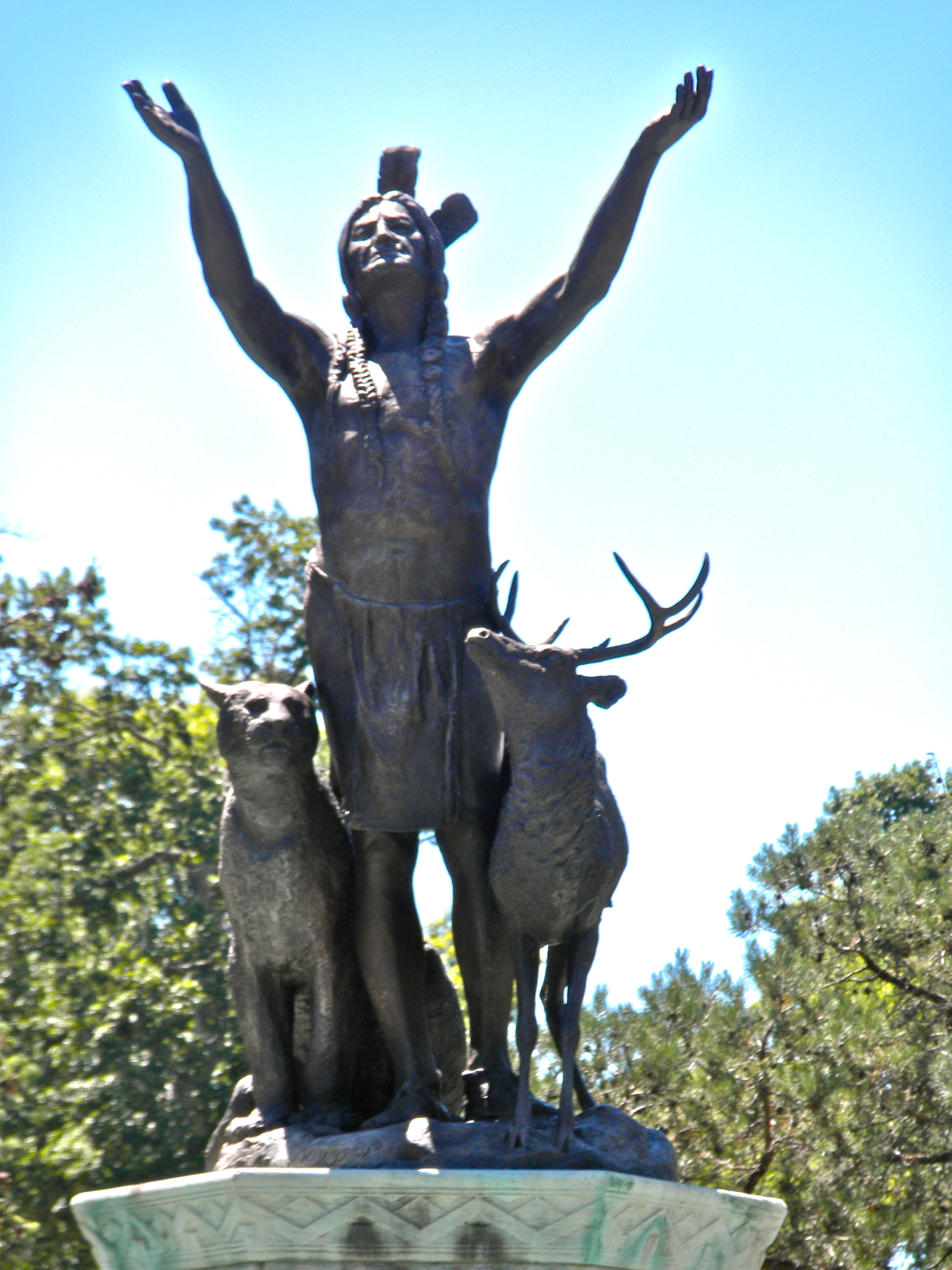
Prayer for Rain, c. 1899, at West Side Park in Champaign, Illinois

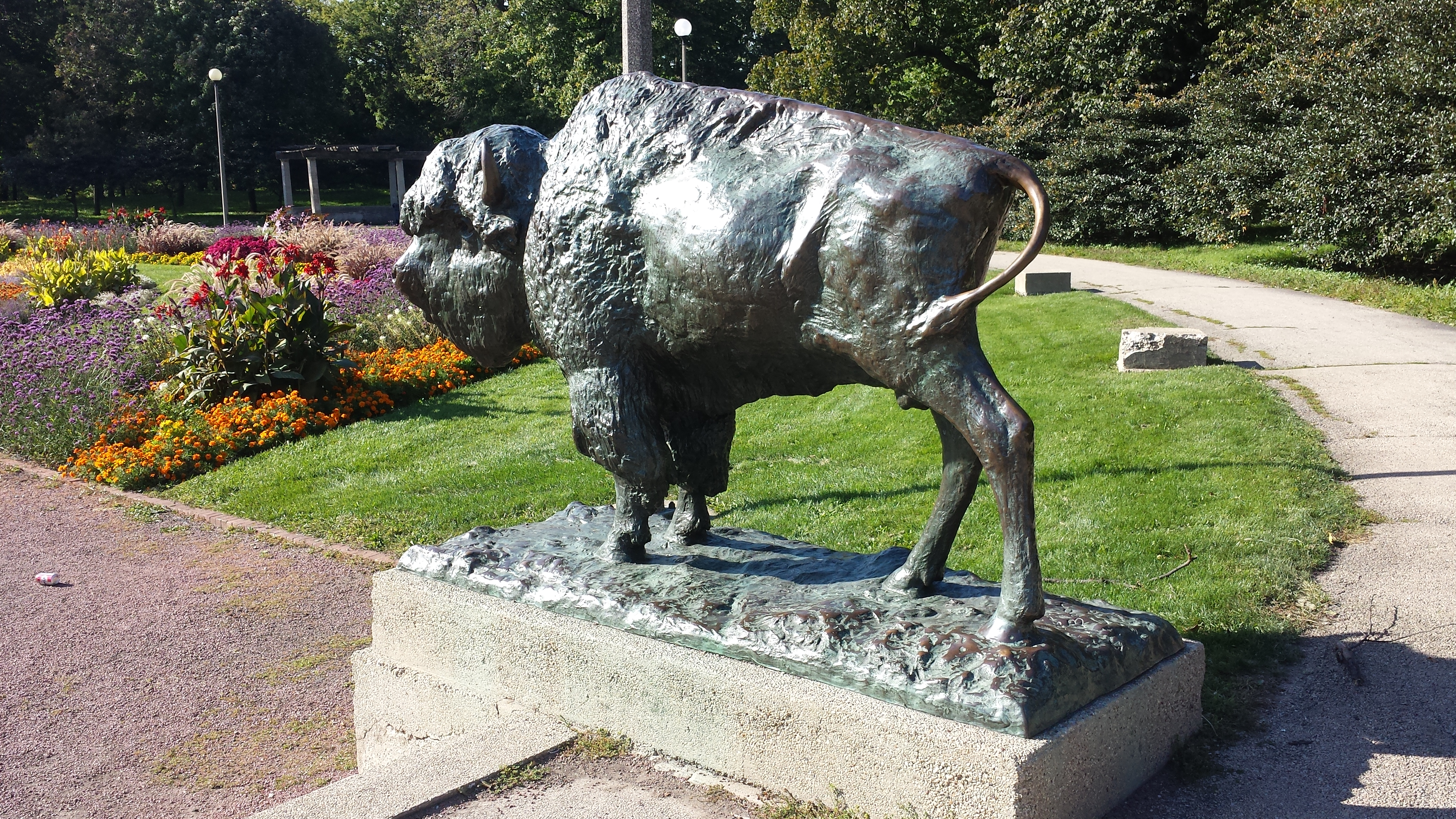
Bronze Bison Sculpture at Humboldt Park Formal Garden in Chicago

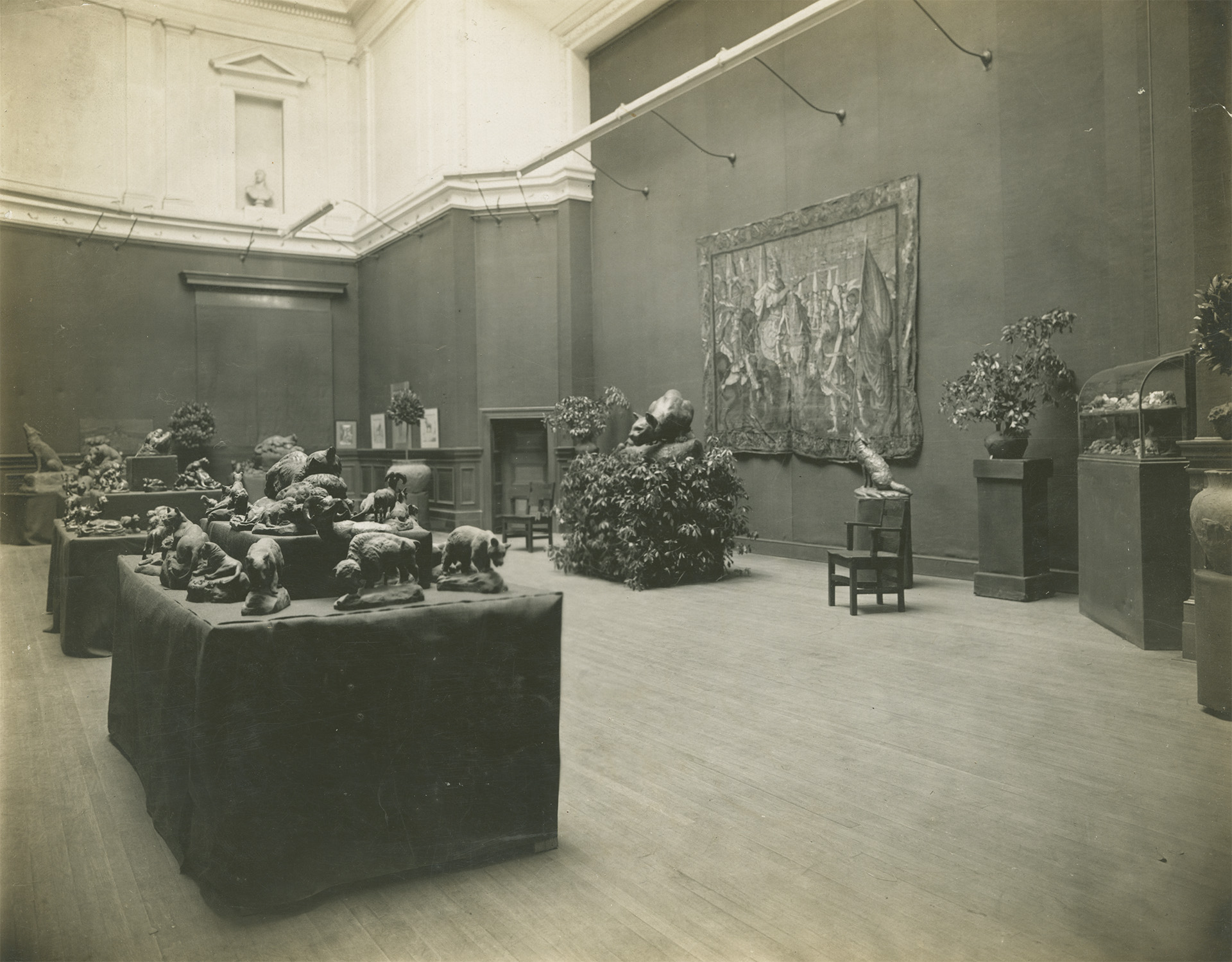
Memorial Exhibition of the Works in Sculpture by the Late Edward Kemeys, December 1907, at Corcoran Gallery of Art in Washington, D.C.

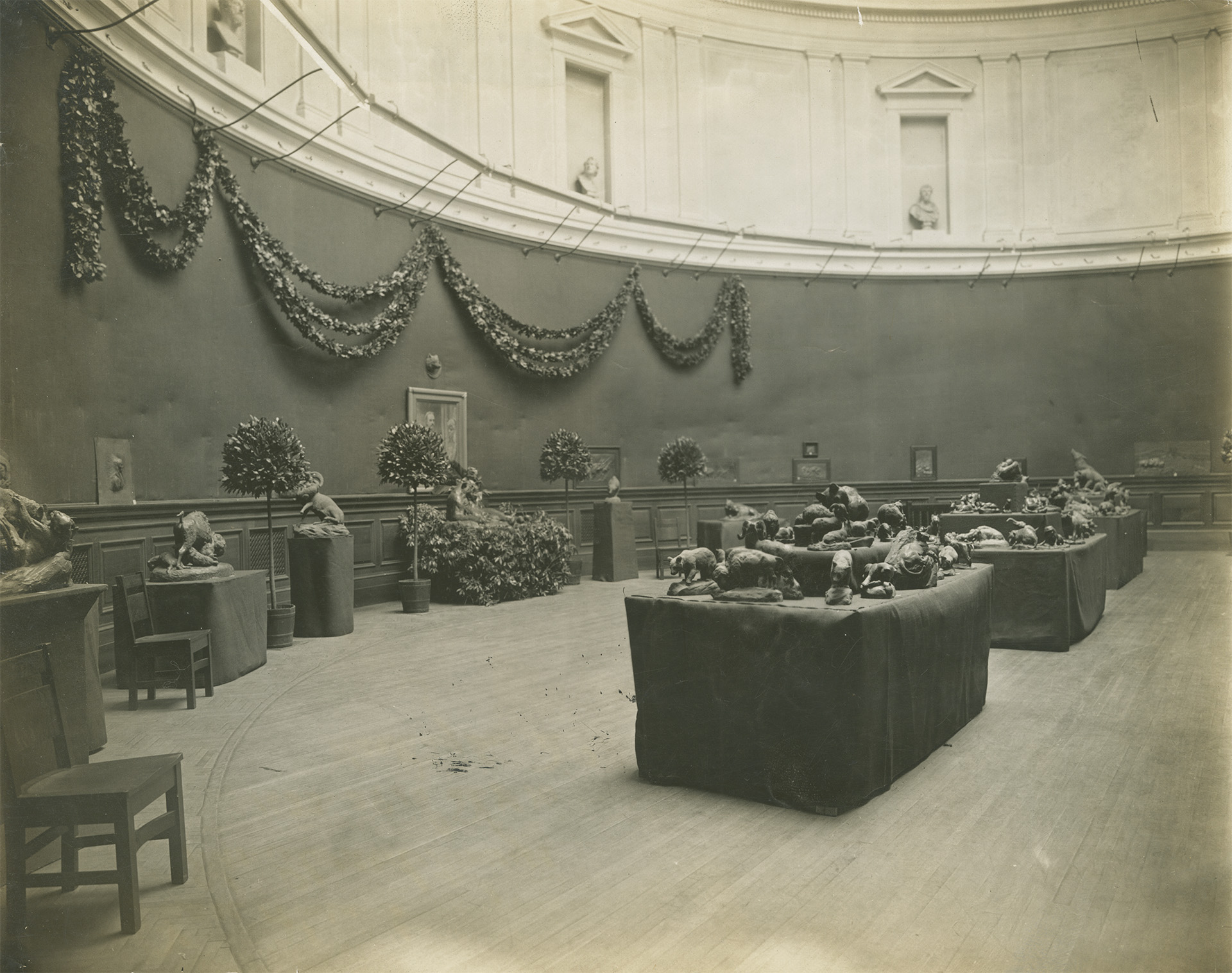
Installation view of the Memorial Exhibition of the Works in Sculpture by the Late Edward Kemeys, Corcoran Gallery of Art, December 15-26, 1907, gelatin silver print, Department of Image Collections, National Gallery of Art Library, Washington, DC

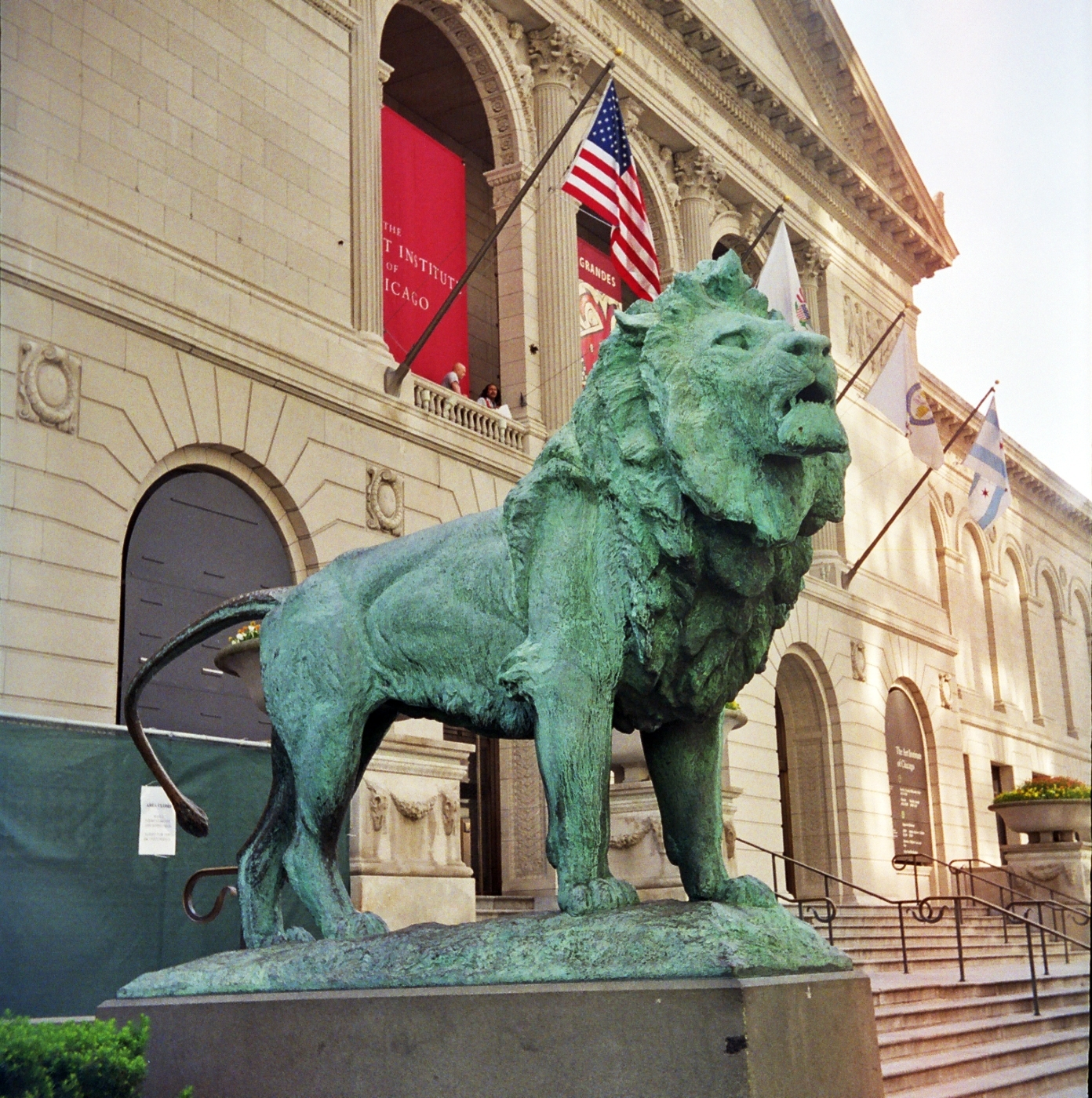
North Lion at the Art Institute of Chicago, 1893

== Furth reading ==
- Wilson, J. G.; Fiske, J., eds. (1892). "Kemeys, Edward" . Appletons' Cyclopædia of American Biography. New York: D. Appleton.
