= Jacob Lipkin =

American sculptor

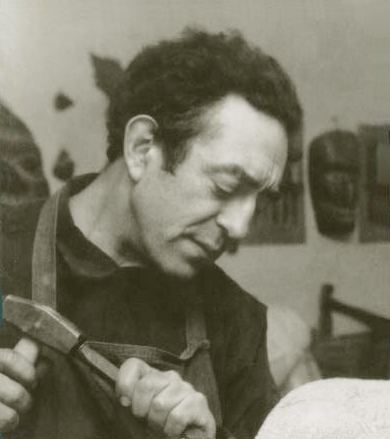
- Jacob Lipkin carving stone circa 1959
- Born: Jacob Lipkin; 19 April 1909; New York City's Lower East Side, U.S.
- Died: 27 April 1996 (aged 87); West Babylon, U.S.
- Education: in Manhattan at The Cooper Union, Educational Alliance, and Leonardo da Vinci Art School
- Known for: sculpture, painting,
- Notable work: Socrates: The Prophet, Ape, Sailor, Whale, Head of a Pony, John Brown, Seahorse, Adolescent, Percheron, Cat, Centaur, Ram, Mother Earth, Mermaid, Youth
- Movement: Realism, Naturalism
- Awards: Antoinette Scudder Prize for Sculpture, Painters and Sculptors Society of New Jersey; Ceceile Award for Sculpture (One-Man Show at the Ceceile Gallery, New York, N.Y.)
- Website: http://www.riveraartse.com/lipkin_about.html About Jacob Lipkin

Jacob Lipkin (1909–1996), was an American sculptor.

Jacob Lipkin, an American sculptor, was born April 19, 1909 on Manhattan's Lower East Side. Lipkin carved in stone and wood with a humanist's sensibility, often using "creatures and people from mythology to convey the harmonious connection between Man and Nature" (from a quote by Koren Der Harootian, in the Village Art Center Catalog, circa 1954).

Between 1937 and 1940, Lipkin studied art in Manhattan at the Educational alliance, The Cooper Union, Art Students League of New York and Leonardo da Vinci Art School. By 1940, Lipkin devoted himself fully to sculpting. He worked and lived his last 40 years in the modest home, studio, and sculpture garden he had built himself in the Township of Babylon, N.Y.

Lipkin's work was exhibited with artists including Chaim Gross, Louise Bourgeois, Louise Nevelson, and Isamu Noguchi in the 1940s to 1950s including at the Pennsylvania Academy of Fine Arts, Providence Art Club, New Jersey Society of Painters and showings at public museums including the Brooklyn Museum and the Whitney Museum of American Art.

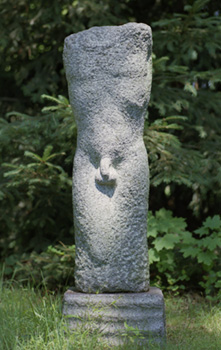
“Youth" (Torso) by Jacob Lipkin, front, 1955. Quincy Granite 41 high (inches). Photograph by Richard Rivera.

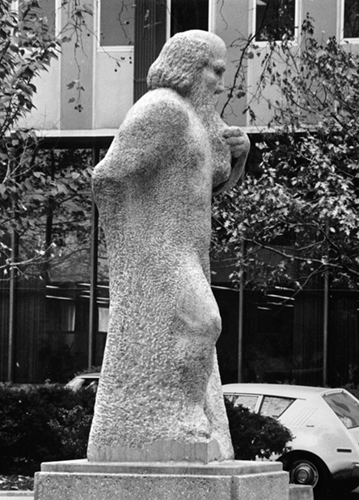
“Socrates, The Prophet” by Jacob Lipkin, 1965. Eight-feet high and carved from Radio Black Vermont marble, it was originally installed at JFK Plaza in Philadelphia in 1968, but it now stands at Cret Park and Ben Franklin Parkway. Photograph by Richard Rivera

In the 1950s Lipkin was an instructor at the North Shore Community College and associate professor at Silvermine College.

Lipkin received numerous awards, including the New Jersey Society of Painters and Sculptors Medal of Honor in 1958 and First Prize in 1964 and Silvermine Guild Award.

He also exhibited widely during the 1950s with a variety of artists. Over nearly four decades he participated in over 70 group exhibitions and had 21 one-man shows.

In 1968 Lipkin had a 30-year retrospective in Philadelphia at the grand lobby of the Provident National Bank where he exhibited 40 sculptures. Lipkin's Socrates, The Prophet, 1968, was originally installed by the Provident National Bank at JFK Plaza and now stands in Cret Park at Ben Franklin Parkway. This eight foot tall, 13,000-pound sculpture of Socrates stands in Philadelphia amongst other famous artists including Henry Moore, Jacob Epstein and Jacques Lipchitz.

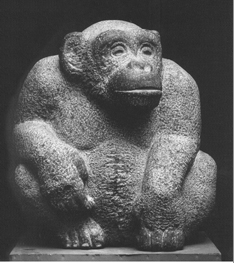
Ape by Jacob Lipkin 1953, Westerly Granite, 21" high x 18" wide x 16" deep in the collection of the Philadelphia Zoo

Jacob Lipkin's work resides in private and public collections and museums. His sculptures in museums include the Head of a Pony, 1947, in grey granite at The Fogg Museum at Harvard; the Camel, 1947, in white marble, and the Ram, 1945, in sandstone and lead at The Parrish Art Museum on Southampton, New York; the Ape, 1953, in the collection of the Philadelphia Zoo; Head of the Prophet Isaiah 1952 at the Jewish Museum in New York City; the Pelican circa 1954 at the St. Lawrence University, Richard F. Brush Art Gallery, Canton, New York; Bear Cub 1966 at the Smithsonian Institution, National Zoological Park, Washington, D.C; and several works at the National Gallery of Art - see his artist information page for photos of the works there. His work at the Gallery contributed to the Index of American Design.

Lipkin's other work residing at museums include The East River, N.Y.C. painting 1928 at the Luce Center of the New-York Historical Society; John Brown bas-relief at the Howard University Law Society in Washington, D.C.; and a sculpture at the Maritime Industry Museum, Fort Schuyler, N.Y.;

Phil Katzman independent filmmaker and associate professor of radio, television, film at Hofstra University, documented Lipkin's life and work in his film, From Stone: Jacob Lipkin, an American Sculptor, which aired on PBS in 1988.

Lipkin told Kermit Jaediker, a reporter at the New York Daily News in January 1960, “Life is funny. All my life I have been banging away to get into the hall of fame. One day I fail to pay a bill, and fame sneaks in my back door.” Jacob Lipkin died of cancer at the age of 87 years on April 27, 1996, in West Babylon, New York.

== Early life ==
Jacob Lipkin was born on April 19, 1909, to Russian-Jewish (now Ukrainian) immigrants. His parents immigrated to the United States during the period between 1890 and 1910 that saw more than 10 million European people come to the U.S.in the Settlement movement. According to Richard Rivera, Lipkin's biographer, Jacob was the 15th of 16 children and as the first of his family to be born in America "became a product of the Lower East Side". Jacob grew up in a community where social organizations such as The Educational Alliance, the Henry Street Settlement, and the Hebrew Immigrant Aid Society (HIAS) had been formed to facilitate the transition of “Americanization.”

In the Newsday article, “A Sculptor's Love, Art Come Home,” by Samson Mulugeta, Rivera states that, “When he [Jacob] was 5, his father died, and he was sent to an orphanage.” Lipkin's father had worked for the New York Edison Company (previously Consolidated Edison), and although Jacob had adult siblings he was placed into an orphanage by his mother where he remained for three years.

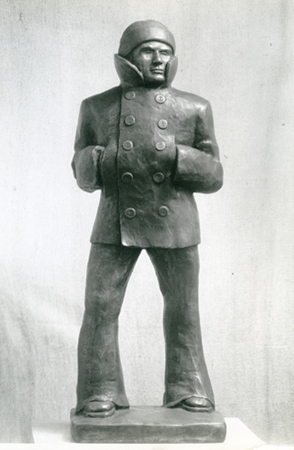
The “Sailor” by Jacob Lipkin, 1948 (bronze, 36 inches high). The only Lipkin sculpture ever cast in bronze, it was made to honor the 9,500 merchant marines killed in World War II. Originally donated to the Seamen's Church Institute of New York in 1953, it was stolen in 1973, then recovered in 2016.

He was liberated from the orphanage three years later by one of his brothers seeking recusal from the military service in the Pancho Villa Expedition of 1917.

Jacob Lipkin was apprenticed to a blacksmith at the age of 12. Four years later as a 16-year-old living on Manhattan's South Street, he lied about his age and sailed out on one of the last of commercial sailing ships—a 3-mast wooden barquentine—as a merchant seaman. For 11 years, Lipkin sailed the world aboard cargo ships and oil tankers before once again making New York City and the Lower East Side his home.

Lipkin was described in the Newsday article “One Man's Poetry,” as a man “of immense curiosity” and “self-educated.” He was a admirer of John Brown (abolitionist), and his avowed emphasis on racial equality.

== Artistic pursuits and family life ==
Jacob Lipkin returned home to New York City in 1936, and by 1937 he was studying art at The Cooper Union, and the Leonardo da Vinci Art School, where he learned carving in stone and wood in the evenings.

From 1932 to 1948 Jacob Lipkin created a number of oil paintings of New York scenes, a self-portrait, and wood sculptures, including Head of a Woman No. 1, 1940, in oak, and Pioneer (Head of Woman), 1950, Lignum Vitae, 19 inches high, in the collection of the New Jersey State Museum; Owl, 1948, in lignum vitae, 21.5 x 8 x 10 inches; and Shark, 1948, in Teakwood.

During the late 1930s at a party, Lipkin met Dorothy Koegan, his future wife. As stated by Estelle Lander in the January 4, 1990 Newsday article “One Man's Poetry,” Lipkin “sat next to her because a beautiful blonde ‘in good shape’ sat on the other side. But [the blonde] was stupid, Dorothy Lipkin said, so he turned to me. Then he found out I had hidden beauty.” They married and had a daughter, Laura, and later, a son, Carl.

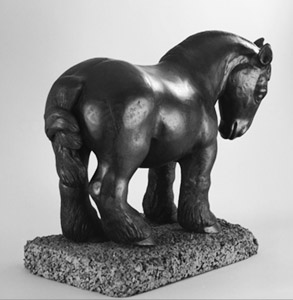
“Percheron” by Jacob Lipkin in 1952. American Black Walnut, 16.5 inches high. Photograph by Richard Rivera.

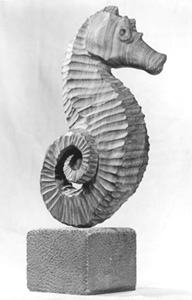
Seahorse by Jacob Lipkin, 1950. Carved from Tropical wood and mounted on a stone block.

At first they lived at an apartment on 17th Street in Manhattan, and later rented a street-level storefront at St. Mark's Place, which Lipkin converted into an apartment and its front section doubled as a gallery. As quoted from the article “Capturing a Sculptor in Stone and Film” by Barbara Delatiner, Sunday New York Times, April 10, 1988, Lipkin said, “In the beginning I sold here and there. But the more immersed I became in morals and mores I realized I couldn't sell my work. The thought of selling was detrimental,” Lipkin said, “it corrodes the creative spirit. I have this need for freedom. And money is a threat as well as a grace. I need freedom to create my works of art.” And so he preferred to donate his work to public institutions to be enjoyed by the public.

To support the family Jacob taught fine art or cleaned cellars, or hauled loads in his 1-ton truck and Dorothy worked as a secretary. “When there was money, we ate better. When there was no money we ate Chinese-style, with a lot of rice and vegetables,” Dorothy is quoted as saying in the January 4, 1990 Newsday article "One Man's Poetry" by Estelle Lander.

During the 1950s Jacob Lipkin was elected a signature member of the Knickerbocker Artists, contributing to many exhibitions on the Lower East Side and throughout the New York City area, as mentioned in two New York Times exhibition reviews “About Art and Artists” by Howard Devree. In the November 2, 1954 article with subhead “Sculpture by Moore at Valentin's Includes Piece Spurned on Madison Avenue” Devree notes that the “show at the Riverside Museum by the Brooklyn Society of Artists and “Prizes ... In the sculpture awards went to Joseph Konzal and Jacob Lipkin ...” and in his May 5, 1954 article with subhead “Five Sculpture Shows Offered in Week—Valentin Assembles Rodin Exhibition” Devree says, “The third group exhibition event is a show of work in a variety of materials by ten invited sculptors at the Studio Gallery of Marcia Clapp, 170 East Seventy-fifth Street. Outstanding are a granite head, Prophet, by Jane Wasey and Ape, a squat powerful figure in the same intractable material, by Jacob Lipkin, who is also represented by a befittingly stolid Turtle in green stone, and the highly stylized figure, Echo, by Koren der Harootian in imperial marble.”

On at least three occasions in the 1960s his sculptures were used as illustrations in The New York Times book review section. Sculptures included the Whale, in walnut, 1946, September 9, 1962, in the edition; the Seahorse, 16 inches high in African walnut, 1950, in the August 8, 1966, edition; and the Adolescent, 40 x 15.5 x 9 inches in rosewood, 1956, in the February 16, 1958, edition.

== Caster controversy and The New York Times coverage ==
On January 7, 1960, the front page of the New York Times ran the story: “Sculptor, a Barter Artist, Blocks Sale of Work to Pay a $153 Debt” written by Ira Henry Freeman. Jacob Lipkin decided in 1959 that he needed an industrial-grade dolly to wheel around his thousand-pound marble blocks. He went to Eugene Gomes, owner of the Kilian Caster Sales Company, promising to give him a work of art, a sculpture, in exchange for the “smooth-turning noiseless heavy pneumatic tires required” (from New York Daily News article, Man Who Hates Money). When Mr. Gomes, who also owned an art gallery in Westchester, New York, came eagerly to the St. Mark's studio to claim a sculpture of his choosing as payment he found that Lipkin did not do abstract art. Jacob Lipkin offered him a four-foot female nude carved in rosewood whose raw material alone had been worth $300. He also showed Gomes a ram's head in travertine marble, but Gomes would not accept it, leaving instead empty-handed.

In the New York Times article, Lipkin is quoted as saying, “Is life abstract? Is an auction sale abstract, a toothache abstract, children maimed by war abstract? Is Love abstract ... Is it abstract to lie on the bowsprit of a 250-foot schooner under full sail—as I have done—and watch the whale leap out of the Pacific? My works assert the goodness of life. Abstract art is the fad of tasteless tastemakers who hate humanity and nature. It will pass in time.”

Mr. Gomes went to an attorney who received a judgment and a marshall. He would “sell what he could to satisfy the judgment” according to the NYTimes. The “marshall was assigned to collect or force an auction of Lipkin's works to pay the debt” according to the New York Daily News. He was determined to collect or force an auctioning away of as many pieces of Jacob's work as necessary to fulfill his $153 payment. When Jacob Lipkin finally became aware of the legal actions Gomes was taking, he rushed to the Legal Aid Society to block the motion.

The New York Times front-page story created nationwide support for the artist. Donations poured in from across the nation totaling over $8,300 in checks and cash, but Lipkin refused to accept the donations stating, “I am not a charity. I cannot take money I did not earn.” And when asked of his dependents and their opinion, he said, “... they would lose all respect for me ... they are more idealistic than I am.” He then related that, “A little girl sent me three $1 bills with a note saying she was sacrificing a piano lesson to help me. A workman in overalls stopped in last night after work and tried to force upon me the few dollars he had in his pocket. He said he would bring me more next payday. I had to walk away or I'd have bust out crying.” And he went on to say “It is an inspiring thing,” Lipkin said, “to see the generosity of people, [and] their respect for a sincere artist,” but he would not accept the donations.

== Sculpture garden ==
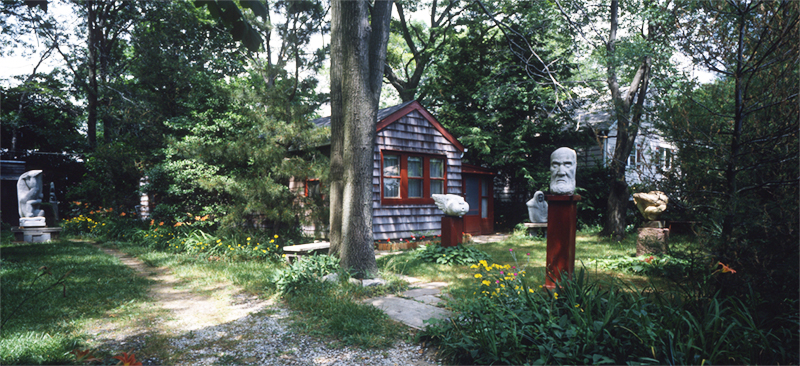
Jacob Lipkin's Babylon home and studio as it existed in 1994, with his sculptures displayed on the front yard. Lipkin built his home and studio himself, with occasional help over the 1950s and 60s. Photograph by Richard Rivera.

Jacob Lipkin lived more than 40 years in the Township of Babylon on a fourth of an acre he had purchased in the 1950s, when the roads of Babylon were unpaved and largely wilderness. Seeking a way to carve large stones that would not fit in the St. Mark's studio, he built a house in Babylon. Initially living in a tent during the construction, and over the years adding a separate studio that housed an anvil and forge, he found a way to fulfill his creativity and carve his largest pieces. Utilizing the skills he had acquired as a boy when apprenticed to a blacksmith, Lipkin occasionally made his own tools in Babylon.

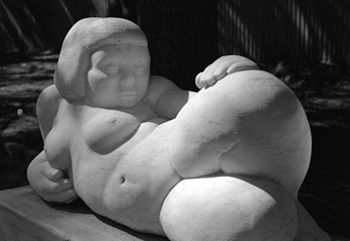
“Mother Earth” by Jacob Lipkin, 1966. Carved in Sienna Marble 19 h x 34 w x 13.5 d inches. Photograph by Richard Rivera.

Although Lipkin carved many pieces in wood, his intention in buying the Babylon property was to have a place where he could carve large blocks of marble because the “sculptures no longer fit in the various downtown lofts he rented” as described in the article One Man's Poetry, Newsday, January 4, 1990. In Babylon, he had the freedom to carve and saw the property as an extension to his Manhattan St. Mark's Place studio.

A photo that tops the Newsday August 28, 1963, article “Sculptor's 10-Year Project: Have Best Man on His Block” has a caption that reads, “SYMBOL of a man's struggle against his basic nature is The Centaur completed by sculptor, Jacob Lipkin, two years ago. It weighs 2,500-pounds and stands in the yard of Lipkin's home in North Babylon.”

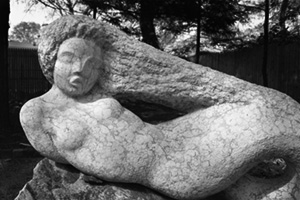
The Mermaid by Jacob Lipkin, carved from Rosetta Marble in 1963. Photograph by Richard Rivera.

His home and museum was located at 377 Silver Street in North Babylon, NY (In this area The postal service delivers mail from the West Babylon post office—11704. ) This is located right in the middle of a residential area. Lipkin was a bit eccentric, very personable and was always looking for someone to talk to. His main topic of conversation was of donating the land and art to the community as a park. A neighbor of his, Sean Fitzgerald, recounts seeing artwork he had on display in his front yard, especially the whimsical pedestal piece of a ovalish cloud blowing wind towards the street. Most of the neighbors were unaware of Lipkin's work. The statues and artwork are now gone.

His Babylon property was also open to the public when he hung the sign “Sculpture Museum, Visitors Invited” on his chain-link fence. In 1988 he had over 1,000 visitors. Although he sometimes referred to Babylon as a “cultural desert wherein the wine of creativity is never tasted,” he was always courteous to visitors who wanted to learn more about the sculptures.

== Carving Socrates, The Prophet ==
Robert Weiss in his Newsday August 28, 1963 article “Sculptor's 10-Year Project: Have Best Man on His Block,” wrote an article on Jacob Lipkin who had begun carving a 13,000-pound, eight-foot high marble block in his Babylon front yard. Lipkin, then 54 years of age, described to Robert Weiss what he hoped to accomplish, “... the figure of a man partly relieved from the stone because Man himself is only partly relieved from the world. The figure also represents a father image which this nation needs.” Robert Weiss went on to say, the Socrates sculpture, “When his statue is finished, Lipkin hopes to donate it to a large museum or institution.” Four years later he had completed his sculpture, Socrates, The Prophet.

== John Brown, a gift to Howard University ==
On a December afternoon in 1964 a ceremony was held at the Howard University to celebrate the installation and unveiling of a 7-foot-tall mahogany bas-relief panel carved by Jacob Lipkin. The gift to the university honored John Brown (abolitionist), was shown in the Washington Daily News carrying a Bible in his hand and a black child on his shoulder.

As written in the December 18, 1964 Washington Daily News article “John Brown: Symbol for Our Time” Jacob Lipkin wrote a dedication letter to the university: “For many years I have devoted my efforts to creating an expression in sculpture of man's faith in himself and his future, and I chose John Brown to demonstrate man's courage and kindness, the strength of convictions, and compassion. It is my intention in view of the services that the Howard University School of Law has contributed to our generation in the fields of civil liberties and civil rights, to make this work available as a memorial and I sincerely trust, as an inspiration.”

== A prophet in Philadelphia ==
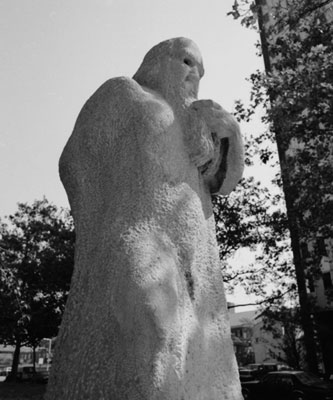
“The Prophet, Socrates” by Jacob Lipkin, 1965. Eight feet high and carved from Radio Black, Vermont marble, the sculpture was originally installed at JFK Plaza in Philadelphia but now stands at Cret Park and Ben Franklin Parkway. Photograph by Richard Rivera.

Jacob Lipkin preferred to donate his sculptures to public institutions where they could be enjoyed by the public rather than selling to private collectors, according to The New York Times. But, due to financial constraints and having to support a family, he also bartered his artworks for services when needed, “That's the way I get along. I made my dentist a lovely rooster in wood, and he made me a beautiful bridge in porcelain. A veterinarian altered one of my cats, so I carved a squirrel in stone as payment.”

In 1967 Lipkin offered the eight-foot-high Socrates, The Prophet to the township of Babylon, where it could be erected at the City Hall. The town leadership refused. Then Lipkin spoke to a personal friend, Robert A. Donner, a Philadelphia resident who worked in Philadelphia as a political liaison with the Park's department. Donner spoke to Paul M. Ingersoll, the vice-president of the Provident National Bank and Ingersoll became intrigued with Lipkin's work. A 30-year retrospective exhibition of Lipkin's work was planned and the bank insured over 40 of Lipkin's works for $14 million in order to ship the sculptures to Philadelphia.

On April 25, 1968, the two-month exhibition had its official opening in the marbled gallery of the Provident National Bank. Socrates, The Prophet, was not in the exhibition gallery. It had been dedicated a week before and placed in the John F. Kennedy Plaza, Philadelphia. At the opening, the curator of the Philadelphia Zoo expressed his desire in having the Ape, a small granite sculpture Lipkin had carved. It was then purchased and became a permanent part of the zoo's collection of fine art.

== The film From Stone: Jacob Lipkin, An American Sculptor ==
According to Barbara Delatiner article in The New York Times story, in 1979 Phil Katzman was introduced to Jacob Lipkin by a mutual friend. Katzman, a filmmaker, who was teaching at the New School for Social Research in New York City had grown up in one of the neighboring towns on Long Island. He found Lipkin to be “an interesting character” and visited him over a year-and-a-half “to get to know Jacob, see if there was a film to be made.” He saw Lipkin as “an artist who had no choice but to do what he had to do, a modern-day Icarus.”

The film was, in Katzman's words, “a labor of love.” Katzman's aim was to create a timeless portrait of the artist. Lipkin was about to begin working on a new piece of sculpture and Katzman wanted to capture the process on film. The new sculpture would be called Icarus, which Lipkin saw as a prophetic metaphor. It was to be Jacob's last work.

Over the seven years it took Katzman to finalize his film he exhausted his budget of $25,000 and $2,000 in grants even though he usually worked with student volunteers as film crews.

As Icarus evolved through the seasons, Katzman filmed Lipkin in marble quarries, sculpting, and discussing his philosophy of art and life. Lipkin lived, worked, and ate surrounded by his sculpture, alone in Babylon and every few months he would go into New York to see his family.

Jacob Lipkin began carving the 6-foot-tall Icarus when he was 72 years of age. It took three years of carving for Icarus to be completed. Lipkin never carved again.

Phil Katzman's film, From Stone: Jacob Lipkin, An American Sculptor, premiered at the North Babylon Public Library on April 16, 1988; one day before Jacob's 79th birthday. From Stone screened on PBS and internationally and won four film festival awards.

== Township of Babylon on and off ==
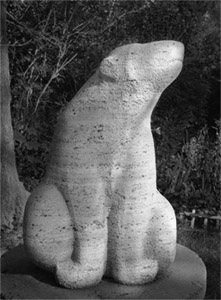
“Polar Bear” by Jacob Lipkin, 1967. Standing 37 inches tall and 24" wide, the Polar Bear was carved in Roman Travertine. Photograph by Richard Rivera.

In the film From Stone Lipkin states, “Before I die I would like to see my work and this quarter acre as a museum, open to the public, free of charge of course. I’ve contacted the powers that be, the City Hall here in Babylon, three times, and they've turned me down.” The reasons for the town's refusal was outlined in The Long Island newspaper, Newsday, January 4, 1990 article that stated, “For years, then, he [Lipkin] knocked on the doors of the Babylon town hall, offering his life's work to each administration. For years, he got no takers: Officials feared hordes descending on Silver Street with nowhere to park, and increased taxes for maintenance of a museum.”

For many years Jacob Lipkin had posted a sign at his gate proclaiming, “Sculpture Museum, Visitors Invited,” and he would welcome all who were interested in learning about the sculptures.

But in 1987 the new Town Supervisor, Arthur G. Pitts, said he was more receptive to Lipkin's proposal that the previous governance, and in the January 4, 1990 Newsday article by Estelle Lander, Pitts is quoted as saying of the Lipkin property, “When I go to his house and look at the sculpture, it moves me. It's like finding a rose in the middle of a weed garden.” The town council under the leadership of Pitts accepted Lipkin's property and sculptures as gift to the town. The Newsday article also stated that, “... papers are being drawn up for the transfer of the property from Lipkin to the town ... Lipkin will stay there rent-free, and will no longer have to pay town and school taxes.”

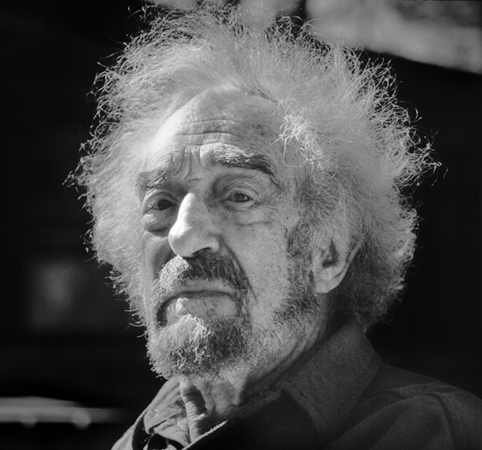
Jacob Lipkin at age 86 was an American sculptor, carving in stone and wood, who exhibited widely from the 1940s through to the 1960s. Photograph by Richard Rivera.

According to Estelle Lander, in another Newsday article, January 4, 1990, “the town began to maintain the exterior of Lipkin's property, and even went so far as to put a new $1,000 roof on the house.” But by 1995 Jacob Lipkin was being pressured by the town for non-payment of taxes. In a January 16, 1996 another Newsday article “The Not-So-Artful Deal” by Caryn Eve Murray stated that the new town supervisor claimed that Lipkin, “never gave the town this property ... he never gave the town a deed until he signed one in October 1995.” Murray goes on to say that Lipkin insisted that the deed had been filed and proper paperwork signed in 1990 by him and his wife Dorothy. However the town claimed that since the deed had never been filed and that Lipkin owed the town nearly $14,700 in unpaid property taxes.

Jacob Lipkin died on April 27, 1996. After several weeks, Jacob's son, Carl Lipkin (1945-2018), worked out an agreement with the town and Suffolk County and paid the back taxes in full. A Newsday article of May 19, 1996 stated, “Carl Lipkin was not unhappy that bureaucratic bungling by the Town of Babylon ... returned to his family what he considers to be its rightful inheritance.” Ultimately, all of the sculptures and artwork reverted to Jacob Lipkin's estate.

== Group exhibitions history 1940–1979 ==
The list of annual/biennial artists indicates Jacob Lipkin exhibited in the 1948 Annual Exhibition of Contemporary American Sculpture, Watercolors, and Drawings, the 1949 Annual Exhibition of Contemporary American Sculpture, Watercolors, and Drawings, and the 1950 Annual Exhibition of Contemporary American Sculpture, Watercolors, and Drawings.

| 1940 | New York World's Fair, United American Artists, National Exhibition, Flushing, NY |
| 1948 | Whitney Museum of American Art, Annual Exhibition of Contemporary American Sculpture, Watercolors And Drawings, New York, NY |
| 1949 | Whitney Museum of American Art, Annual Exhibition of Contemporary American Sculpture, Watercolors And Drawings, New York, NY |
| 1950 | Audubon Artists, 8th Annual Exhibition, National Academy Galleries, New York, NY |
| 1950 | Whitney Museum of American Art, Annual Exhibition of Contemporary American Sculpture, Watercolors And Drawings, New York, NY |
| 1951 | Audubon Artists, 9th Annual Exhibition, National Academy Galleries, New York, NY |
| 1952 | Artists Equity Association (now New York Artists Equity Association), Exhibition of Paintings by Members of the Artists Equity Association, New York Chapter, Kaufmann Gallery, New York, NY |
| 1952 | Audubon Artists, 10th Annual Exhibition, National Academy Galleries, New York, NY |
| 1952 | Artists Equity Association, “American Sculpture. 1952.” New York Artists Equity Building, New York, NY |
| 1953 | Silvermine Guild of Artists, 4th Annual New England Exhibition, Norwalk, CT |
| 1953 | Audubon Artists, 11th Annual Exhibition, National Academy Galleries, New York, NY |
| 1953 | The Grand Central Moderns, “Guest Sculptors,” New York, NY |
| 1953 | Pennsylvania Academy of the Fine Arts, 148th Annual Exhibition of Painting and Sculpture, Philadelphia, PA |
| 1954 | The Studio Gallery of Marcia Clapp (Invitational), New York, NY |
| 1954 | Painters and Sculptors Society of New Jersey, Riverside Museum, New York, NY |
| 1954 | Knickerbocker Artists, 7th Annual Exhibition, The National Arts Club, New York, NY |
| 1954 | Silvermine Guild of Artists, Silvermine College, New Canaan, CT |
| 1954 | The Cosmopolitan Artists, Riverside Museum, New York, NY |
| 1954 | Brooklyn Society of Artists, 38th Annual Exhibition, Riverside Museum, New York, NY (last show 1962, became part of The American Society of Contemporary Artists) |
| 1954 | Art League of Long Island, Inc., (now National Art League) 24th Annual Spring Exhibition, St. John's Parish Hall, Flushing, NY |
| 1954 | Art League of Long Island, Inc., 24th Annual Members’ Exhibition, Flushing, NY |
| 1954 | Village Art Center, “Eleven Year Retrospective of Prizewinners Work,” |
| 1955 | Whitney Museum of American Art, New York, NY |
| 1955 | Audubon Artists, 13th Annual Exhibition, National Academy Galleries, New York, NY |
| 1955 | Art League of Long Island, Inc., 25th Annual Spring Exhibition, St. John's Parish Hall, Flushing, NY |
| 1955 | Brooklyn Society of Artists, 39th Annual Exhibition, New Yorker Hotel, New York, NY |
| 1955 | Silvermine Guild of Artists, Faculty Members Exhibition, New Canaan, CT |
| 1955 | Painters and Sculptors Society of New Jersey, 13th Annual Exhibition, National Arts Club, New York, NY |
| 1955 | Knickerbocker Artists, 8th Annual Exhibition, Riverside Museum, New York, NY |
| 1956 | Painters and Sculptors Society of New Jersey, Annual National Exhibition, Museum Galleries of the Public Library, Jersey City, NJ |
| 1956 | Brooklyn Society of Artists, “Exhibition by American Artists Living in Greater New York,” |
| 1956 | Union Dime Savings Bank, Madison Avenue & 39th Street, New York, NY |
| 1956 | Lower Eastside Artists, 1st Exhibition, St. Mark's Parish House (historically known as St. Mark's-in-the-Bouwerie), New York, NY |
| 1957 | Audubon Artists, 15th Annual Exhibition, National Academy Galleries, New York, NY |
| 1957 | Painters and Sculptors Society of New Jersey Inc., 16th Annual National Exhibition, Jersey City Museum, Jersey City, NJ |
| 1957 | Lower Eastside Independent Artists (formerly Lower Eastside Artists), 2nd Annual Exhibition, St. Mark's Parish House, New York, NY |
| 1957 | Hudson Guild Gallery, 9th Chelsea Art Exhibit (Three Man Show), New York, NY |
| 1957 | Knickerbocker Artists, 10th Annual Exhibition, Riverside Museum, New York, NY |
| 1957 | Silvermine Guild of Artists, 8th Anniversary New England Exhibition, New Canaan, CT |
| 1958 | Audubon Artists, 16th Annual Exhibition, National Academy Galleries, New York, NY |
| 1958 | Painters and Sculptors Society of New Jersey, 17th Annual National Exhibition, Jersey City Museum, Jersey City, NJ |
| 1958 | Hudson Guild Gallery, 10th Anniversary Art Exhibition (Invitational), New York, NY |
| 1959 | Painters and Sculptors Society of New Jersey, 18th Annual National Exhibition, Jersey City Museum, Jersey City, NJ |
| 1959 | Silvermine Guild of Artists, “7 Sculptors & 5 Printmakers,” New Canaan, CT |
| 1959 | Knickerbocker Artists, 12th Annual Exhibition, National Arts Club, New York, NY |
| 1959 | Silvermine Guild of Artists, 10th Anniversary New England Exhibition, New Canaan, CT |
| 1959 | Artists Equity Association (Members Invitational), Kaufmann Gallery, New York, NY |
| 1959 | Providence Art Club |
| 1960 | Audubon Artists, 18th Annual Exhibition, National Academy Galleries, New York, NY |
| 1960 | Brooklyn & Long Island Artists, Biennial Exhibition, The Brooklyn Museum, Brooklyn, NY |
| 1961 | Audubon Artists, 19th Annual Exhibition, National Academy Galleries, New York, NY |
| 1961 | Knickerbocker Artists, 14th Annual Exhibition, National Arts Club, New York, NY |
| 1961 | Painters and Sculptors Society of New Jersey, 20th Annual National Exhibition, Jersey City Museum, Jersey City, NJ |
| 1962 | Knickerbocker Artists, 15th Annual Exhibition, National Arts Club, New York, NY |
| 1962 | The North Shore Community Arts Center, Annual Faculty Exhibition, Roslyn, NY |
| 1962 | Silvermine Guild of Artists, 13th Annual New England Exhibition, New Canaan, CT |
| 1963 | Knickerbocker Artists, 16th Annual Exhibition, National Arts Club, New York, NY |
| 1963 | Audubon Artists, 21st Annual Exhibition, National Academy Galleries, New York, NY |
| 1963 | Painters and Sculptors Society of New Jersey, 22nd Annual National Exhibition, Jersey City Museum, Jersey City, NJ |
| 1964 | Knickerbocker Artists, 17th Annual Exhibition, National Arts Club, New York, NY |
| 1964 | Audubon Artists, 22nd Annual Exhibition, National Academy Galleries, New York, NY |
| 1964 | Painters and Sculptors Society of New Jersey, 23rd Annual National Exhibition, Jersey City Museum, Jersey City, NJ |
| 1964 | Knickerbocker Artists, 4th Members Exhibition, Manufacturers Hanover Trust Company, Union Carbide Building*, New York, NY |
| 1965 | Audubon Artists, 23rd Annual Exhibition, National Academy Galleries, New York, NY |
| 1965 | Painters and Sculptors Society of New Jersey, 24th Annual National Exhibition, Jersey City Museum, Jersey City, NJ |
| 1965 | Knickerbocker Artists, 18th Annual Exhibition, National Arts Club, New York, NY |
| 1966 | Knickerbocker Artists, 6th Members Exhibition (served on Exhibition Committee), Manufacturers Hanover Trust Company, Union Carbide Building*, New York, NY |
| 1966 | Painters and Sculptors Society of New Jersey, 25th Annual National Exhibition, Jersey City Museum, Jersey City, NJ |
| 1967 | Knickerbocker Artists, 20th Anniversary Exhibition, The Lever House, New York, NY |
| 1968 | Knickerbocker Artists, 19th Annual Exhibition, National Arts Club, New York, NY |
| 1968 | Painters and Sculptors Society of New Jersey, 27th Annual National Exhibition, Jersey City Museum, Jersey City, NJ |
| 1970 | Knickerbocker Artists, 20th Annual Exhibition, National Arts Club, New York, NY |
| 1979 | Parrish Art Museum, “Nature's Bounty— Works from the Parrish Art Museum Collection,” Southampton, NY |

== Solo exhibitions (known) ==
| 1950 c. | Hudson Guild Gallery, New York, NY |
| 1951 | Village Art Center, New York, NY |
| 1963 c. | Awixa Pond Art Center, Bayshore, NY |
| 1968 | Provident National Bank, “A 30 Year Retrospective: 1938-1968,” Philadelphia, PA |

== Artworks in public collections ==
| Child with Dog | 1950 | Tennessee marble | Bellevue Hospital (City of New York Health & Hospitals Corporation), New York, NY (stolen circa 1960) |
| Socrates, The Prophet | 1968 | Roman travertine | City of Philadelphia, at Cret Park at Ben Franklin Parkway (previously Kennedy Plaza), Philadelphia, PA |
| Head of Pony | 1947 | grey granite | The Fogg Art Museum, Harvard University, Cambridge, MA |
| John Brown | 1928 | bas-relief in mahogany | Howard University, Washington, DC |
| The Prophet Isaiah | 1952 | oatmeal granite | Jewish Museum, New York, NY |
| Technology Panel | 1946 | bas-relief | Pilgrim Psychiatric Center (formerly Pilgrim State Hospital), West Brentwood, NY |
| Third Avenue EL | 1936 | oil on canvas | Museum of the City of New York, New York, NY |
| Lion | 1962 | red porphyry | National Jewish Medical and Research Center, Denver, CO |
| Pioneer | 1950 circa | lignum vitae | New Jersey State Museum, Trenton, NJ |
| The East River, New York City | 1928 | oil on canvas | New York Historical Society, New York, NY |
| Camel | 1947 | white marble | Parrish Art Museum, Southampton, NY |
| Ram | 1945 | sandstone and lead | Parrish Art Museum, Southampton, NY |
| Ape | 1953 | westerly granite | Philadelphia Zoological Garden, Philadelphia, PA |
| Sailor | 1948 | bronze | Seamen's Church Institute, New York, NY (stolen in 1973 recovered 2016 now held by Lipkin estate) |
| Pelican | 1954 | marble | St. Lawrence University, Richard F. Brush Collection, Canton, NY |
| Clown | 1954 | long grain yellow pine | North Babylon Public Library, Babylon, NY |
| Girl with Doll | 1951 | American black walnut | North Babylon Public Library, Babylon, NY |
| Bear Cub | 1966 | Italian porphyry | Smithsonian Institution, National Zoological Park, Washington, DC |
| Panther | 1956 circa | Spanish marble | Staten Island Institute of Arts and Sciences, Staten Island, NY |
| | | | Maritime Museum, Fort Schuyler, NY |

== Prizes and awards ==
1953 Silvermine Guild of Artists— Anonymous Award of $100 for Sculpture
1954 Art league of Long Island, Inc.— Art League of Long Island Award for Sculpture
1954 Painters and Sculptors Society Prize In Sculpture
1954 Brooklyn Society of Artists— Sculpture House Award
1955 Brooklyn Society of Artists— Distinctive Merit in Sculpture
1955 Painters and Sculptors Society Prize In Sculpture
1957 Painters and Sculptors Society of New Jersey— Antoinette Scudder Prize for Sculpture
1957 Silvermine Guild of Artists— Prize in Sculpture
1958 Painters and Sculptors Society of New Jersey Medal of Honor for Sculpture
1959 Silvermine Guild of Artists— Helene T. Jacobs Memorial Award
1959 Painters and Sculptors Society of New Jersey— Ceceile Award for Sculpture (One-Man Show at the Ceceile Gallery, New York, NY)
1961 Audubon Artists— Honorable Mention
1961 Knickerbocker Artists— Knickerbocker Artists Prize for Sculpture
1961 Painters and Sculptors Society Prize In Sculpture
1964 Painters and Sculptors Society of New Jersey Medal of Honor for Sculpture
1966 Painters and Sculptors Society of New Jersey— Pariscraft Company (Johnson & Johnson) Material Award
1970 Knickerbocker Artists— Knickerbocker Artists Prize for Sculpture

== Quotes ==
“Is life abstract? Is an auction sale abstract, a toothache abstract, children maimed by war abstract? Abstract art is the fad of tasteless taste-makers who hate humanity and nature. It will pass in time.” Jacob Lipkin, quoted in “Sculptor, A Barter Artist, Blocks Sale of Work to Pay a $153 Debt” January 7, 1960, New York Times by Ira Henry Freeman

“My works assert the goodness of life.” Jacob Lipkin, quoted “The Man Who Hates Money” by Kermit Jaediker. New York Daily News, Sunday News, January 31, 1960, page 3.

“The instant that consciousness became aware of itself Man became Man ... [he] knew immediately that materials of which the world was made were the same as those from which he was created. His consciousness was shared by all matter.” —from Jacob Lipkin's essay The Prophecy in Art from Lipkin's website: Jacob Lipkin: About the Artist
