= Laura Swing Kemeys =

American sculptor (1864–1934)

Laura Swing Kemeys (November 3, 1864 – November 5, 1934) was a noted American sculptor animalier. She was the wife of fellow sculptor Edward Kemeys, with whom she collaborated.

== Early life ==
Born as Laura Sparks Swing in Cumberland County, New Jersey on November 3, 1864, Kemeys was the youngest of five children of Simon Sparks Swing and his second wife, Judith L. Tomlinson. She was the last of fourteen children that Simon Sparks Swing had fathered, also having nine half-sibling that were each between 21 and 30 years her elder. The most recent United States Census preceding her birth, the 1860 Census, listed her father as a farmer. Simon Sparks Swing died at age 58, shortly after she was conceived and prior to her birth.

The 1870 United States census shows her, her mother mother, and her three living full-siblings as residing in Bridgeton, New Jersey, a thriving industry town at the time. The 1880 United States census indicates that at 16 years of age, she was attending an art school.

== Adulthood ==
In 1883, she graduated from the "advance course" offered at the New Jersey State Normal School in Trenton, New Jersey (since renamed as The College of New Jersey). Within thirty months after her graduation, she both took a teaching position at the most prestigious school in Perth Amboy, New Jersey and was promoted to the school's vice principal, earning a $600 annual salary. In this same timeframe, she also began dating Edward Kemeys.

She and Edward Kemeys married on June 13, 1885, at New York City's Church of the Advent. The two regularly moved residences, first living together in a house constructed by George Inness in Perth Amboy. By 1866, her husband had opened an art studio in New York City, and the two resided in Manhattan, New York City. Four years afterwards, they moved and worked in Morristown, New Jersey, where Kemeys worked as a seller of home decorations. Kemeys ultimately began joining her husband as an art assistant, and ultimately became a noted sculptor in her own right. Coming to share an appreciation for artistic realism and a fascination wild animals with her husband, she would join him annually on hunting expeditions in the Western United States where they would observe, dissect, and draw animals that would later be put to use as models for sculptures. In 1886, the two had a son, William.

In 1892, she and her husband moved to Chicago, after receiving a large commission to create sculptures to decorate the grounds of the 1893 World's Columbian Exposition. They resided near Jackson Park on the South Side of Chicago. Kemeys collaborated with her husband on sculptures such as temporary lion sculptures that were displayed at the exposition. Kemeys considered both her husband Edward Kemeys and sculptor Lorado Taft to have been her mentors as an artist.

By the 1890s, Kemeys began to receive greater recognition as an artist independent of her husband's, having her works exhibited at the Art Institute of Chicago.

Kemeys' family, accompanied by her mother, moved to Washington, D.C. in 1902 after their friend Theodore Roosevelt (whom they had befriended in 1886, and with whom they shared their love for the wildlife of the United States) became the president of the United States. Roosevelt was a committed patron to Edward Kemeys' art. By this time, a number animaliers that had been trained in France were usurping Kemeys in prominence. Edward Kemeys opened a studio near Dupont Circle.

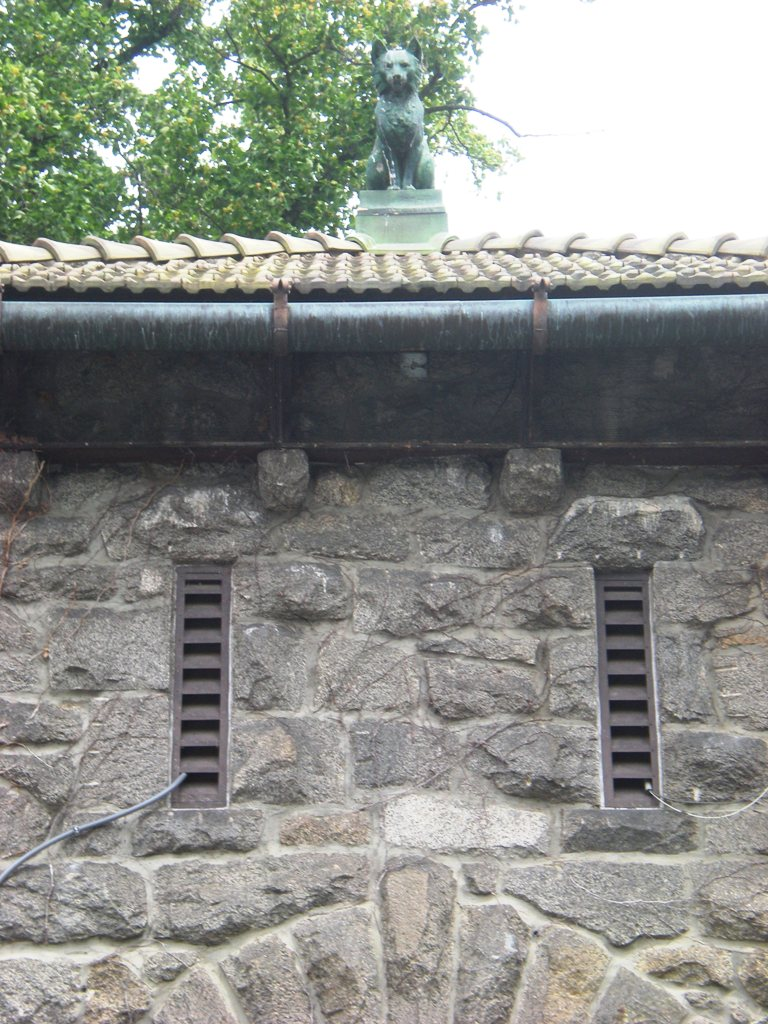
Sculpture of a fox cub created by Kemeys, displayed at the United States National Zoo

While in Washington, D.C. Kemeys had works exhibited at the Pennsylvania Academy of Fine Arts and received a commission for nine sculptures at the new Small Mammal House of the United States National Zoo. The building is today known as the "Think Tank".

Kemeys was widowed in 1907 after the death of her husband. Afterwards, she arranged a large exhibition at the Corcoran Gallery of Art of her late husband's works. In 1909, Kemeys' mother died. The following year, she and her son moved out of a house they had been living in into an apartment building in Washington, D.C.

1915 advertisements show that Kemeys had moved to a home studio where she was working as a sculptor.

Kemeys died November 5, 1934 in Washington, D.C. She was buried at Arlington National Cemetery, alongside her husband who was a veteran of the American Civil War.
