= January 6 United States Capitol attack =

2021 attack to stop election certification

- Part of the attempts to overturn the 2020 United States presidential election, American militia movement, political violence in the United States, and domestic terrorism in the United States
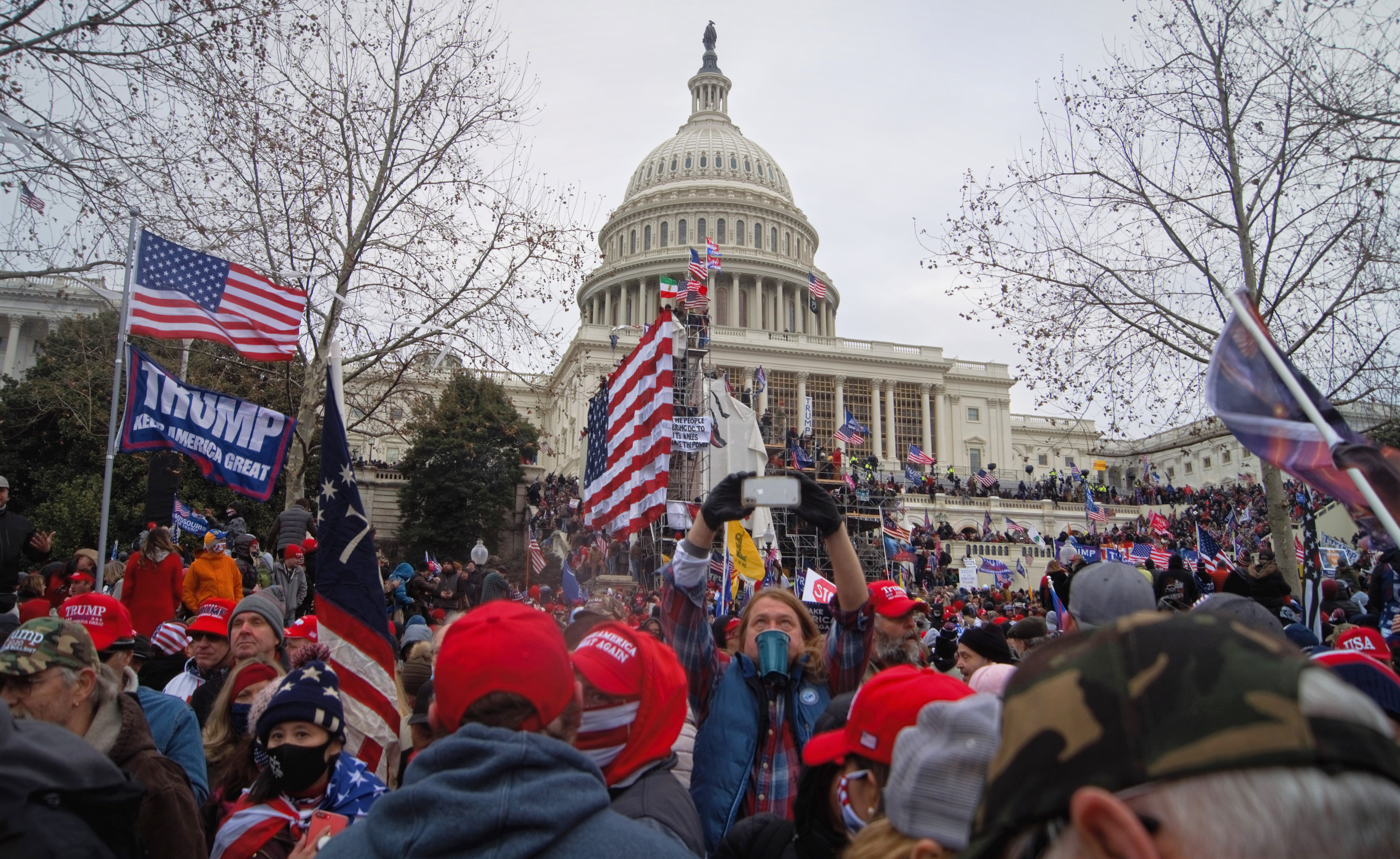
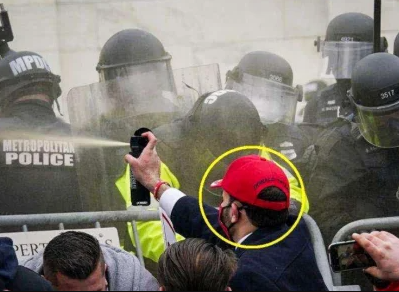
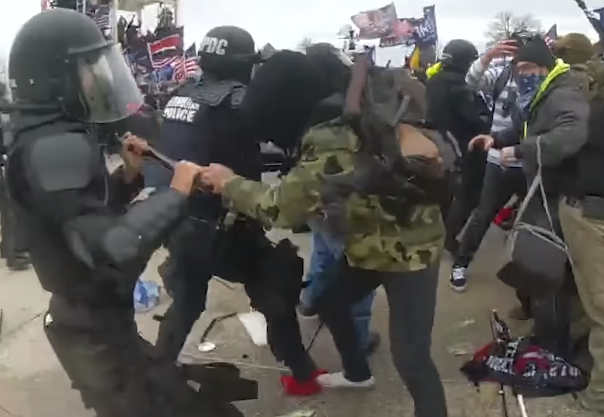
- Crowd outside the Capitol during the attack (top); bear spray deployed against a line of policemen (bottom left); attackers breach a police line (bottom right)
- Date: January 6, 2021; 5 years ago c. 12:53 p.m. – 5:40 p.m. (UTC−05:00)
- Location: The Capitol Building, Washington, D.C., United States; 38°53′23″N 77°00′33″W
- Caused by: False claims of 2020 presidential election fraud made by Donald Trump and his allies; Denial of the 2020 presidential election results; Far-right extremism in the United States, conspiracy, intimidation, incitement of insurrection, attacking a legislature
- Goals: Disrupt and delay the Electoral College vote count; Pressure Congress and Vice President Mike Pence to overturn the election of Joe Biden in favor of Trump
- Result: Attack mostly unsuccessful: Insurrection suppressed; Fatalities and injuries among the attackers and law enforcement (Note: See Casualties and suicides section for a full set of details.); Assaults on at least 174 police officers; Delay of counting electoral votes by hours; Extensive physical damage; offices and chambers vandalized and ransacked; property stolen; more than $30 million for repairs and security measures; Second impeachment of Donald Trump; Third indictment of Donald Trump; Unsuccessful attempts to declare Trump ineligible for Colorado, Maine, and Illinois ballots; Trump pardons or commutes the sentences of all rioters in 2025

Parties
Pro-Trump, far-right militias and movements: Proud Boys; Oath Keepers; Factions of the Three Percenters; QAnon movement; White supremacists, neo-Fascists, neo-Nazis, and neo-Confederates; Various far-right movements; (Full list)	United States: Federal Government; Washington D.C.; State Governments; U.S. Capitol Police; D.C. Metropolitan Police; Montgomery County Police; Metro Transit Police; Prince George's County Police; Supreme Court Police; Virginia State Police; Federal Bureau of Investigation; Department of Homeland Security; U.S. Secret Service; Virginia Army National Guard; Maryland State Police; Maryland Army National Guard; New Jersey State Police; D.C. Army National Guard

Lead figures
President Donald Trump; Enrique Tarrio; Joe Biggs; Stewart Rhodes	Vice President Mike Pence; Speaker Nancy Pelosi; Steven Sund

Casualties and criminal charges
- Deaths: On January 6: 1 rioter killed by gunshot; 1 rioter died from drug overdose; 2 rallygoers died from natural causes; Following January 6: 1 police officer died of a stroke; 4 police officers died by suicide (Note: 1 dead from a stroke, 4 officers died by suicides within seven months of the attack)
- Injuries: Unknown number of rioters; At least 174 police officers, including at least 15 hospitalized
- Charged: 1,500 or more, including Trump (Note: Attributed to multiple sources.) (see also: Criminal charges relating to the attack and 2025 pardons)

On January 6, 2021, the United States Capitol in Washington, D.C., was attacked by a mob of supporters of President Donald Trump. Academic debate exists about whether to characterize the event as an attempted coup, an attempted self-coup, or neither. The attack happened two months after Trump's defeat in the 2020 presidential election. Attackers sought to keep him in power by preventing a joint session of Congress from counting the Electoral College votes to formalize the victory of then president-elect Joe Biden. The attack was unsuccessful in preventing the certification of the election results. According to the bipartisan House select committee that investigated the incident, the attack was the culmination of a plan by Trump to overturn the election. Within 36 hours, five people died: one was shot by the Capitol Police, another died of a drug overdose, and three died of natural causes, including a police officer who died of a stroke a day after being assaulted by rioters and collapsing at the Capitol. (Note: The coroner listed the manner of Sicknick's death as "natural", defined as a term "used when a disease alone causes death. If death is hastened by an injury, the manner of death is not considered natural." The coroner also stated that "All that transpired played a role in his condition". The coroner said there was no "evidence of internal or external injuries".) Many people were injured, including 174 police officers. Four officers who responded to the attack died by suicide within seven months. Damage caused by attackers exceeded $2.7 million.

Called to action by Trump on January 5 and 6, thousands of his supporters had gathered in Washington, D.C., to support his false claims that the 2020 election had been "stolen by emboldened radical-left Democrats", and to demand that then–vice president Mike Pence and Congress reject Biden's victory. Starting at noon on January 6, at a "Save America" rally on the Ellipse, Trump gave a speech in which he repeated false claims of election irregularities and said, "If you don't fight like hell, you're not going to have a country anymore". As Congress began the electoral vote count, thousands of attendees, some armed, walked to the Capitol, and hundreds breached police perimeters. Among the rioters were leaders of the Proud Boys and the Oath Keepers extremist militia groups.

The FBI estimates 2,000–2,500 people entered the Capitol during the attack. Some vandalized and looted, including in the offices of House speaker Nancy Pelosi and other Congress members. Rioters assaulted Capitol Police officers and journalists. Capitol Police evacuated and locked down both chambers of Congress and several buildings in the Complex. Rioters occupied the empty Senate chamber, while federal law enforcement officers defended the evacuated House floor. Pipe bombs were found at the Democratic National Committee and Republican National Committee headquarters, and Molotov cocktails were discovered in a vehicle near the Capitol. Trump resisted sending the National Guard to quell the mob. That afternoon, in a Twitter video, he restated false claims about the election and told his supporters to "go home in peace". The Capitol was cleared of rioters by mid-evening, and the electoral vote count was resumed and completed by the morning of January 7, concluding with Pence declaring the final electoral vote count in favor of President-elect Biden. Pressured by his cabinet, the threat of removal, and resignations, Trump conceded to an orderly transition of power in a televised statement.

A week after the attack, the House of Representatives impeached Trump for incitement of insurrection, making him the only U.S. president to be impeached twice. After Trump had left office, the Senate voted 57–43 in favor of conviction, but fell short of the required two-thirds, resulting in his acquittal. Senate Republicans blocked a bill to create a bipartisan independent commission to investigate the attack, so the House instead approved a select investigation committee. (Note: Pelosi offered a committee makeup of seven Democrats and six Republicans; however House Minority Leader Kevin McCarthy refused to appoint any Republicans unless they included some who had voted to overturn Electoral College results.) They held public hearings, voted to subpoena Trump, and recommended that the Department of Justice (DOJ) prosecute him. Following a special counsel investigation, Trump was indicted on four charges, all dismissed following his 2024 election to the presidency. Trump and elected Republican officials have promoted a revisionist history of the event by downplaying the severity of the violence, spreading conspiracy theories, and portraying those charged with crimes as hostages and martyrs.

Of the 1,424 people then charged with federal crimes relating to the event, 1,010 pled guilty, and 1,060 were sentenced, 64% of them to jail time. Some participants were linked to far-right extremist groups or conspiratorial movements, including the Oath Keepers, Proud Boys, and Three Percenters, some of whom were convicted of seditious conspiracy. Enrique Tarrio, then chairman of the Proud Boys, received the longest sentence, a 22-year prison term. No one was charged with the crime of insurrection. In 2022, Biden signed a new law to clarify how electoral votes are to be counted. On January 20, 2025, upon taking office again, Trump granted clemency to all January 6 rioters, including those convicted of violent offenses.

== Background ==
=== Attempts to overturn the presidential election ===
Joe Biden, of the Democratic Party, defeated incumbent Republican Party president Donald Trump in the 2020 presidential election. Trump and other Republicans attempted to overturn the election, falsely claiming widespread voter fraud.

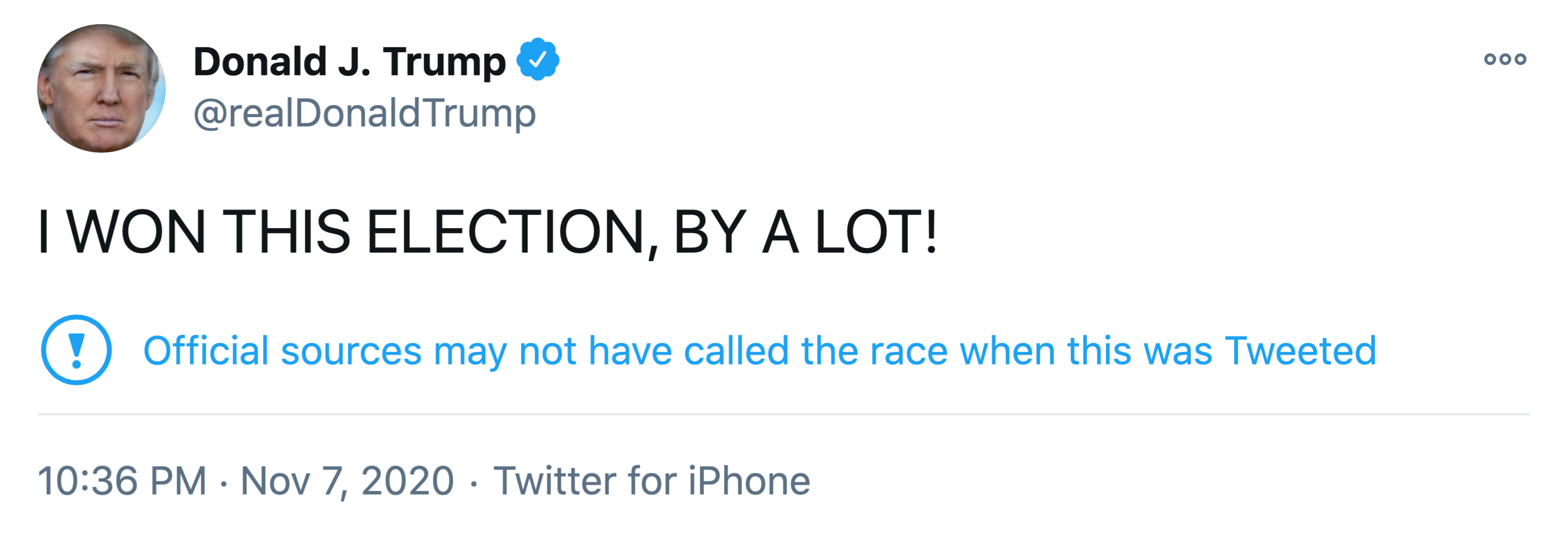
Trump's tweet shortly after polls had closed

Within hours after the polls closing, while votes were still being tabulated, Trump declared victory, demanding counting be halted. He began a campaign to subvert the election, through legal challenges and extralegal effort. Some of Trump's attorneys concluded there was neither a factual foundation nor valid legal argument for challenging the election results. Others cited the Electoral Count Act of 1887 as they tried to overturn Trump's loss (that law would later be amended in 2022 to prevent recurrence of the January 6 debacle). Before leaving office, Trump sought to overturn the results by filing sixty lawsuits, including two that came before the Supreme Court. Those challenges were all rejected by the courts, for lack of evidence or legal standing.

Trump then mounted a campaign to pressure Republican governors, secretaries of state, and state legislatures to nullify results by replacing slates of Biden electors with slates pledged to Trump, or by manufacturing evidence of fraud. He demanded lawmakers investigate ostensible election "irregularities", such as by conducting signature matches of mailed-in ballots, disregarding any prior analytic efforts. Trump made inquiries regarding the possibility of invoking martial law to "re-run" or reverse the election and appointed a special counsel to find instances of fraud, despite conclusions by federal and state officials that such cases were few or non-existent. Trump ultimately undertook neither step.

Working with the Trump campaign, lawyers John Eastman and Kenneth Chesebro wrote a series of memorandums detailing a plan for the campaign to submit its own unauthorized sets of electoral votes. After the submission of these documents, it was intended that the presiding officer of the United States Senate, either President of the Senate Mike Pence or President pro tempore Chuck Grassley, would claim to have the unilateral power to reject electors during the January 6, 2021, vote counting session; the presiding officer would reject all electors from the several states in which the Trump campaign had submitted false documents, thereby overturning the election results in favour of Trump. Trump repeatedly urged Pence to obstruct the count and stop Biden from taking office, despite this not being within Pence's constitutional powers as president of the Senate. (Note: Attributed to multiple sources:) Trump repeated this call in his rally speech on the morning of January 6. Trump's role in the plot to use fake electors led to prosecutions in Georgia and in federal court.

Numerous scholars, historians, political scientists, and journalists have characterized these efforts to overturn the election as an attempted self-coup by Trump and an implementation of the "big lie". However, there is scholarship on the other side as well; post-January 6 scholarship is split about whether to include that event within the term "coup," some say yes, some say no. News reporting about scholarly opinions reflects that division.

=== Planning of January 6 events ===
On December 18, Trump called for supporters to attend a rally before the January 6 Congressional vote count, writing on Twitter, "Big protest in D.C. on January 6th. Be there, will be wild!". On December 28, far-right activist Ali Alexander described collaboration with the Proud Boys and explained the purpose of the January 6 event would be "to build momentum and pressure" to convince members of Congress to alter the election results. He named three Republican members of the House as allies who were planning "something big": Paul Gosar, Andy Biggs and Mo Brooks. "We're the four guys who came up with a January 6 event", Alexander said.

On December 23, Roger Stone's group Stop the Steal posted plans to "occupy just outside" the Capitol with promises to "escalate" if opposed by police. Stone recorded a video for his "Stop The Steal Security Project" to raise funds "for the staging, the transportation and most importantly the security" of the event. The event was largely funded by Trump donor Julie Fancelli, heiress to the Publix supermarket fortune, who budgeted $3 million for and spent at least $650,000. Fancelli's funding, via conspiracy theorist Alex Jones, was used to reserve the Ellipse. With Fancelli's funding, a robocall campaign urged people to "march to the Capitol building and call on Congress to stop the steal". Jones claimed the White House asked him to lead the march to the Capitol.

On January 2, Trump announced plans to speak at the "March to Save America" rally on January 6. (Note: Multiple notes: Amy Kremer of Women for Trump had been granted a permit the day prior.; Other organizations taking part in the event included: Black Conservatives Fund, Eighty Percent Coalition, Moms For America, Peaceably Gather, Phyllis Schlafly Eagles, Rule of Law Defense Fund, Stop The Steal, Turning Point Action, Tea Party Patriots, Women For America First, and Wildprotest.com.) On January 4, Steve Bannon said he was part of "the bloodless coup".

==== Seditious conspiracy by Oath Keepers and Proud Boys ====
On November 5, two days after the election, leaders of the Oath Keepers began communicating about a "civil war". On November 9, the leaders held a members-only online conference in which leader Stewart Rhodes outlined a plan to stop the transfer of power, including preparations for using force. The Oath Keepers planned to store "an arsenal" with a "Quick Reaction Force" (QRF) in nearby Alexandria, Virginia. The leaders planned to procure boat transportation so bridge closures could not prevent their entry into D.C. (Note: Attributed to multiple sources.)

On December 12, about 200 Proud Boys joined a march near Freedom Plaza and the Trump International Hotel dressed in combat fatigues and ballistic vests. In scuffles between protesters and counter-protesters, four people were stabbed and at least 23 arrested. Three days later, Proud Boy members were being photographed wearing apparel featuring the antisemitic, Neo-Nazi slogan "6MWE" (6 million wasn't enough), referring to the number of Jewish Holocaust victims. The slogan was accompanied by an Eagle and fasces symbol used by the Italian Fascists. The image, which spread on Twitter, prompted the Anti-Defamation League to declare that the "Proud Boys' Bigotry is on Full Display".

On December 19, Oath Keepers leader Kelly Meggs called Proud Boys leader Enrique Tarrio. One Proud Boy leader posted a message saying, "I am assuming most of the protest will be at the capital [sic] building given what's going on inside". The Proud Boys leadership encouraged members to attend the January 6 event. Leaders used a crowdfunding website to raise money and purchase paramilitary equipment such as concealed tactical vests and radio equipment in preparation for the attack. Chapter leadership spent the days prior to, and morning of January 6, planning the attack. On December 29, leaders announced plans to be "incognito" on January 6, by not wearing their traditional black and yellow garb. On December 30, the leadership received a document titled "1776 Returns", which called for the occupation of "crucial buildings" on January 6 and argued for supporters to "Storm the Winter Palace" in a reference to an attack on the Capitol. On January 3 and 4, Proud Boys leadership explicitly discussed "storming" the Capitol.

On January 3, Rhodes departed home, having spent $6,000 on a rifle and other firearms equipment in Texas, and $4,500 in Mississippi, en route to D.C. On January 5, leaders began unloading weapons for the "QRF". Leaders drove into D.C. on a "reconnaissance mission". On January 4, Tarrio was arrested by D.C. police in connection with a prior destruction-of-property charge. Fearing the police would access Tarrio's messaging apps, leadership deleted the group chat and created a new one. Tarrio was released on January 5 and ordered to leave the city. Rather than immediately comply, he traveled to a parking garage to meet with Oath Keepers leader Stewart Rhodes.

The night of January 5, Proud Boys leaders divided members into teams, passed out radios, and programmed them to specific channels in preparation. Orders were issued to assemble at 10 a.m. at the Washington Monument. Leadership warned members to avoid police and blend in with the public. On January 6, about 100 plainclothes members assembled at the Washington Monument and were led to the Capitol to participate in the attack.

=== Predictions of violence ===
The weeks preceding January 6 were filled with predictions of violence by Trump supporters. The attack was later said to be "planned in plain sight", with postings on social media even planning for violence on January 6.

Commentators had long feared that Trump might provoke violence after an electoral loss. (Note: In 2019, Kara Swisher speculated Trump might encourage supporters to "rise up in armed insurrection to keep him in office".) For weeks before January 6, there were over one million mentions of storming the Capitol on social media, including calls for violence against Congress, Pence, and the police. On December 28, a map was posted showing entrances and exits to the Capitol and tunnels that connect it to House and Senate office buildings. Black X's represented forces that would be "ready for action" if Congress tried to certify the election. On January 1, the operator of a website about the tunnels noticed a traffic spike, prompting him to notify the FBI of a likely attack.

From December 29 to January 5, the FBI and its field offices warned of armed protests at every state capitol and reported plans by Trump supporters that included violence. On December 30, one popular comment was posted, saying, "I'm thinking it will be literal war on that day. Where we'll storm offices and physically remove and even kill all the D.C. traitors and reclaim the country". That comment was highlighted in a January 2 article by The Daily Beast which reported protesters were discussing bringing guns, breaking into federal buildings, and attacking law enforcement. In the days leading up to the attack, organizations, including ones that monitor online extremism, issued warnings about the event.

On January 5, the media published stories about widespread predictions of violence, and D.C. mayor Muriel Bowser called for residents to avoid the downtown area where protesters would march. Two D.C. food and lodging establishments with a history of being patronized by the Proud Boys announced temporary closures, citing safety concerns. Members of Congress reached out to law enforcement charged with protecting the Capitol against violence and were assured Capitol Police were prepared.

Three days before the Capitol attack, the Capitol Police intelligence unit circulated a memo warning that Trump supporters see the day of the Electoral College vote count "as the last opportunity to overturn the results of the presidential election" and could use violence against "Congress itself" on that date.

=== Law enforcement and National Guard preparations ===
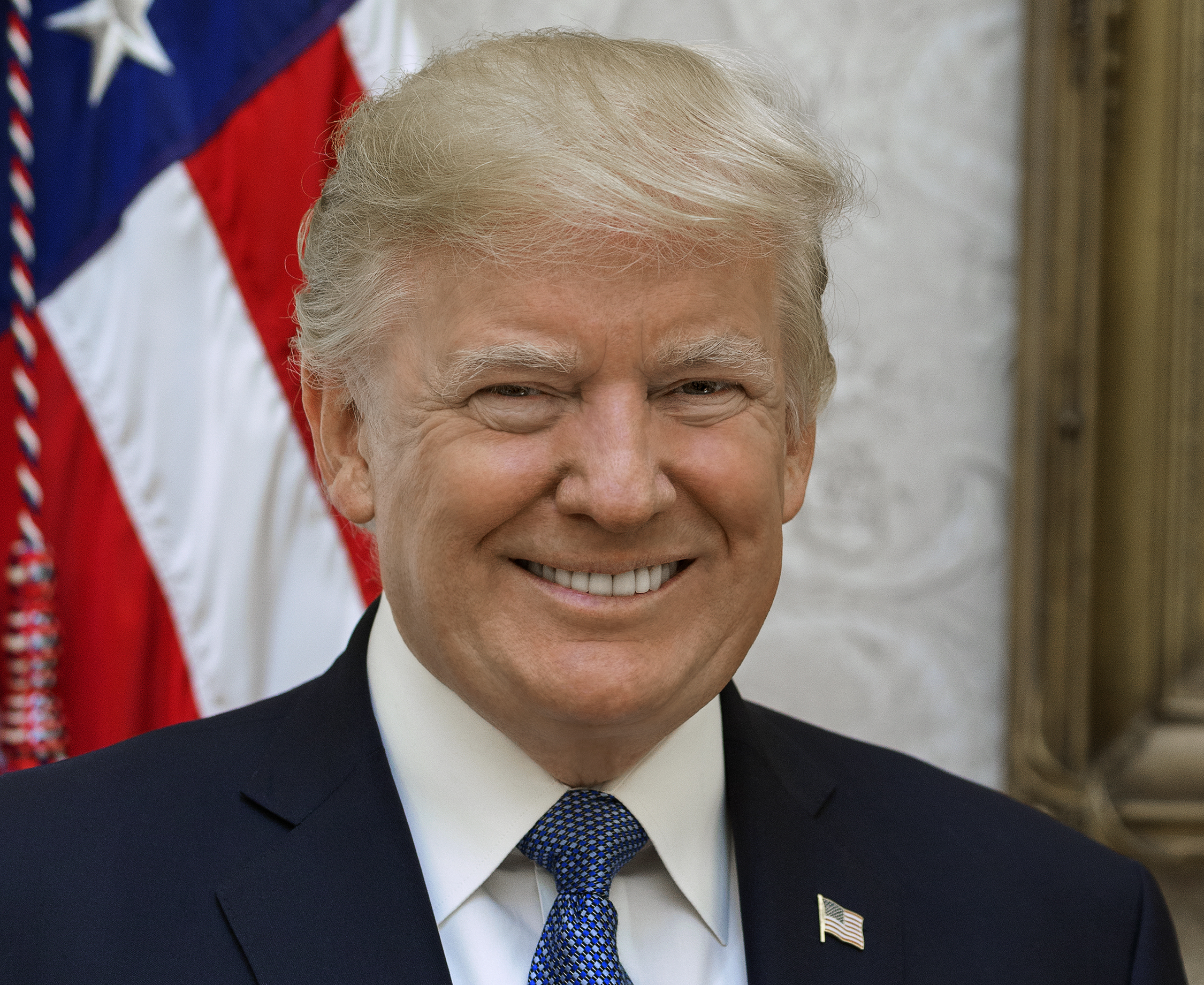
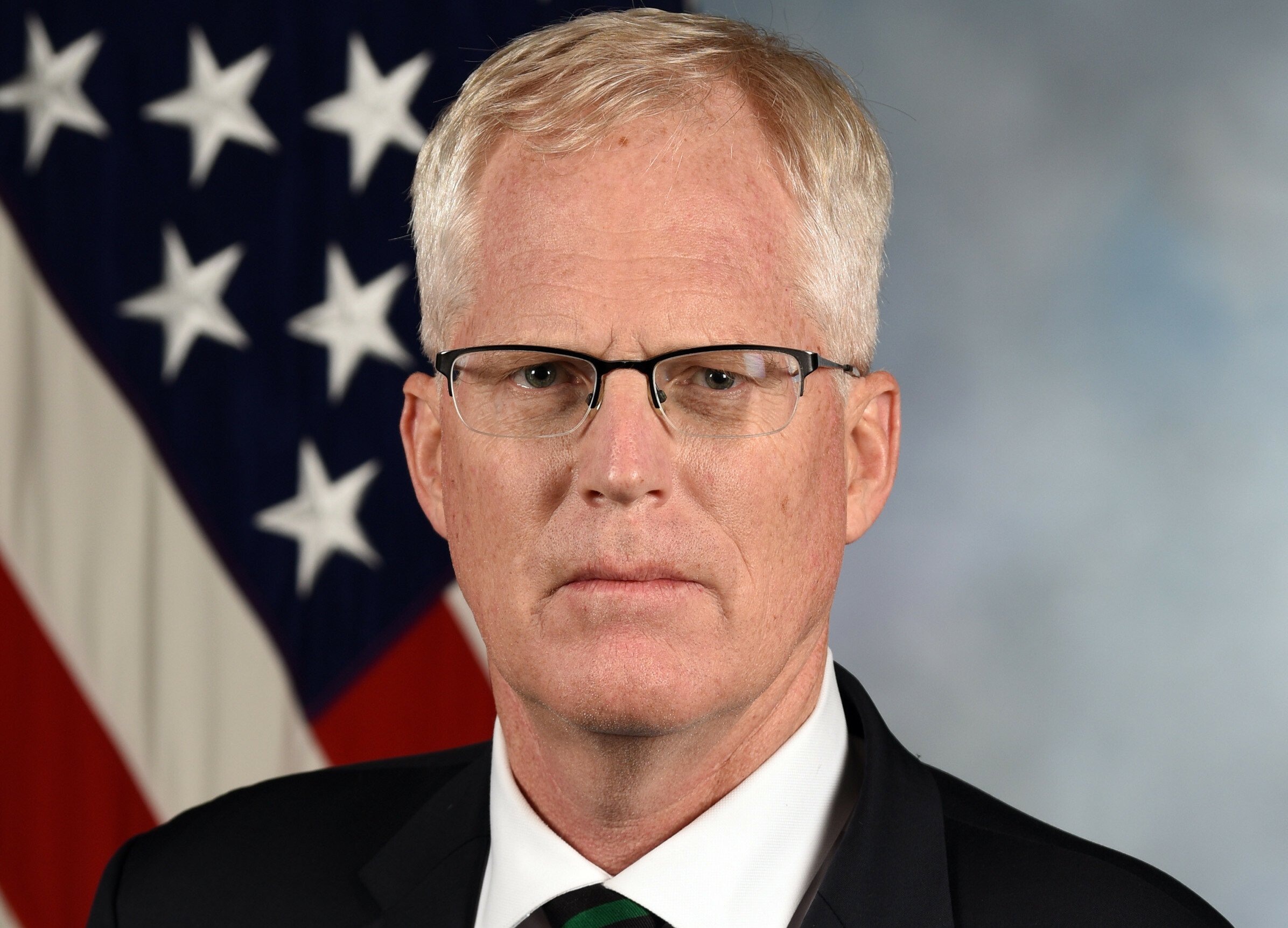
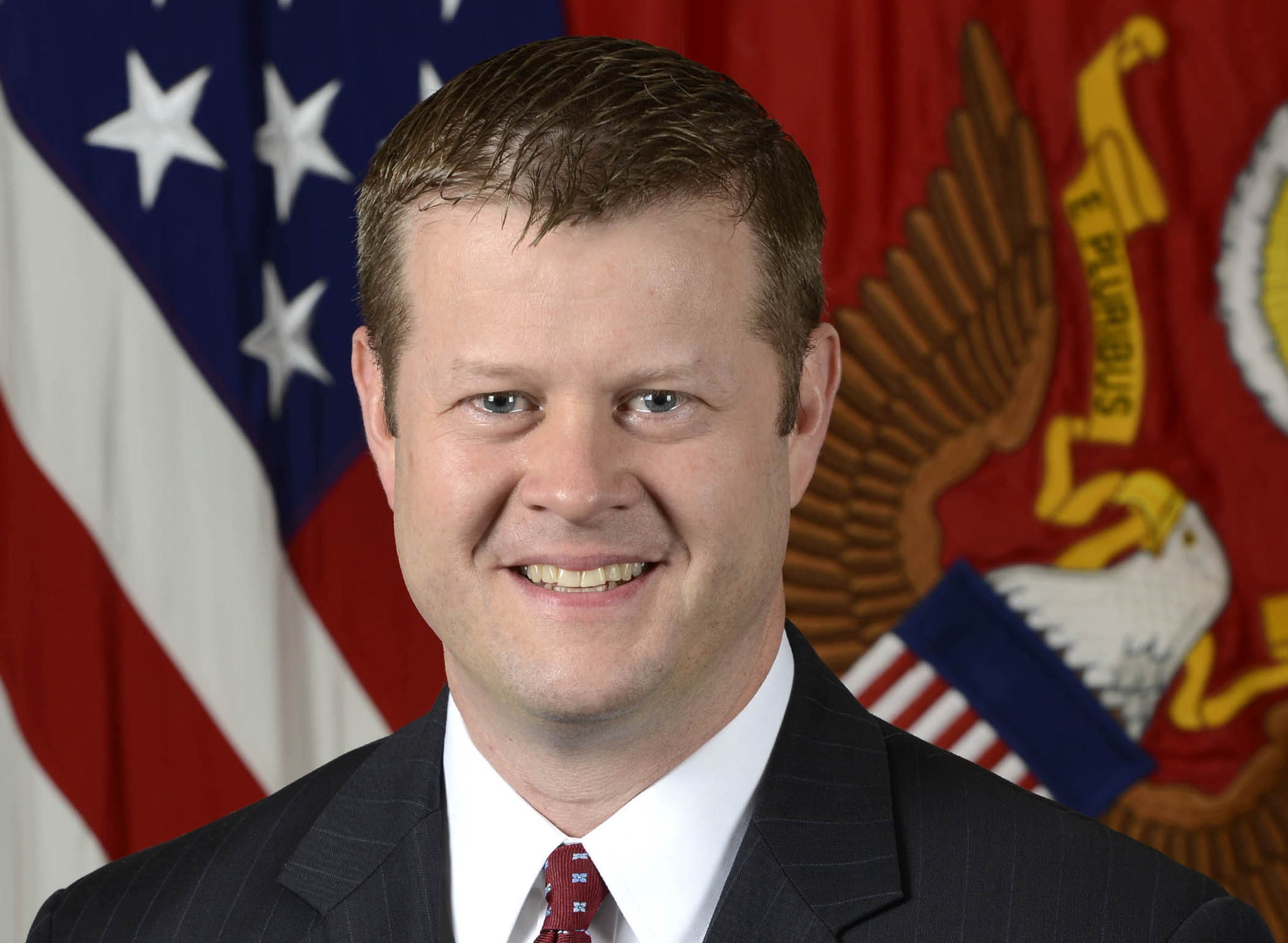
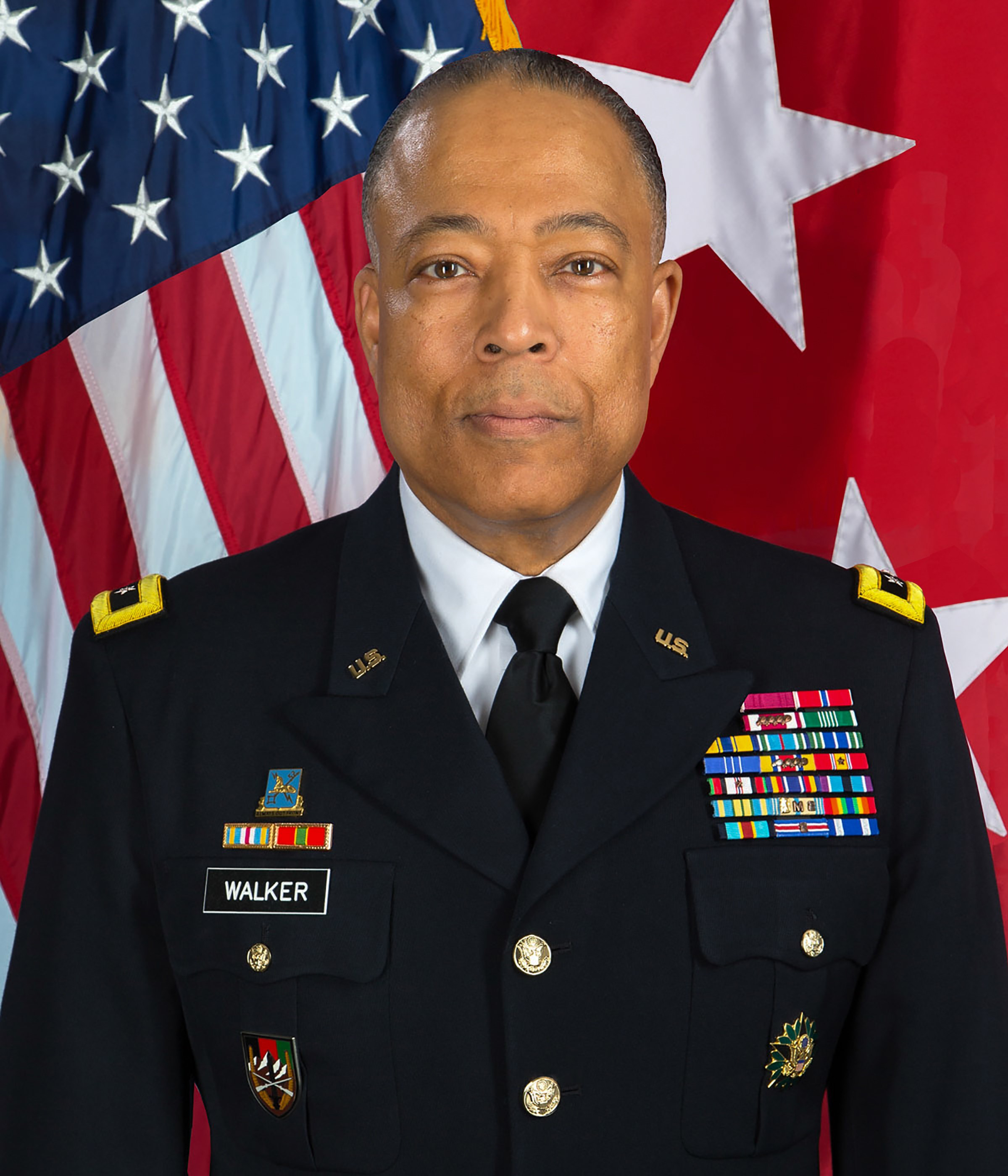
The Chain of Command to the D.C. National Guard at the time of the attack; from Commander-in-Chief Donald Trump to the recently appointed Acting-Secretary of Defense Christopher C. Miller, to Acting-Secretary of the Army Ryan D. McCarthy to General William Walker the commander of the District of Columbia National Guard.

On November 9, Trump fired Secretary of Defense Mark Esper and replaced him with Christopher C. Miller. In response, Central Intelligence Agency (CIA) director Gina Haspel told Chairman of the Joint Chiefs of Staff Mark Milley "we are on the way to a right-wing coup". On December 18, Miller unilaterally terminated the Department of Defense's transition to the incoming administration, falsely claiming it was a mutually-agreed pause for the holidays.

On January 2, Republican senator Mitt Romney – who himself had lost the 2012 presidential election against Barack Obama, and conceded in an orderly manner – contacted Senate majority leader Mitch McConnell, predicting reinforcements would be denied, "... a senior official at the Pentagon... reports that they are seeing very disturbing social media traffic regarding the protests planned on the 6th. There are calls to burn down your home, Mitch; to smuggle guns into DC, and to storm the Capitol. I hope that sufficient security plans are in place, but I am concerned that the instigator—the President—is the one who commands the reinforcements the DC and Capitol police might require".

On January 3, all ten living former defense secretaries released an open letter in which they expressed concerns about a potential coup to overturn the election, mentioning Christopher Miller by name. That day, Trump ordered Miller to "do whatever was necessary to protect the demonstrators" on January 6. The next day, Miller signed a memo severely limiting the ability of the D.C. National Guard to deploy without his permission. Since his appointment in 2018, D.C. National Guard commanding major general William J. Walker had standing orders to respond to civil disturbances in the district, but on January 5, Walker received new orders from Secretary of the Army Ryan McCarthy forbidding him to respond to a civil disturbance without explicit prior approval from McCarthy and Miller. Previously, he had authority to respond without seeking permission. After the attack, Walker described the order as "unusual", noting "It required me to seek authorization from the secretary of the Army and the secretary of defense to essentially protect my guardsmen".

On January 4, D.C. mayor Bowser announced that the Metropolitan Police Department of the District of Columbia (MPD) would lead law enforcement in the district, and would coordinate with the Capitol Police, the U.S. Park Police, and the Secret Service. Jurisdictionally, the Metropolitan Police Department is responsible for city streets of the National Mall and Capitol area, whereas the Park Police are responsible for the Ellipse, the Secret Service is responsible for the vicinity of the White House, and the Capitol Police is responsible for the Capitol complex itself. During a meeting with a representative of the Capitol Police, the Mayor asked, "[W]here does your perimeter start?" At that point, the individual left the room, and stopped participating in the conference. The mayor later recalled, "[T]hat should have been like a trigger to me. Like these people, they don't want to answer questions about their preparation".

On January 6, under "orders from leadership", the Capitol Police deployed without "less lethal" arms such as sting grenades. The Capitol Police armory was not properly maintained; riot shields had been improperly stored at the wrong temperature, rendering them ineffective, while ammunition stores were expired.

== Trump supporters gather in D.C. ==
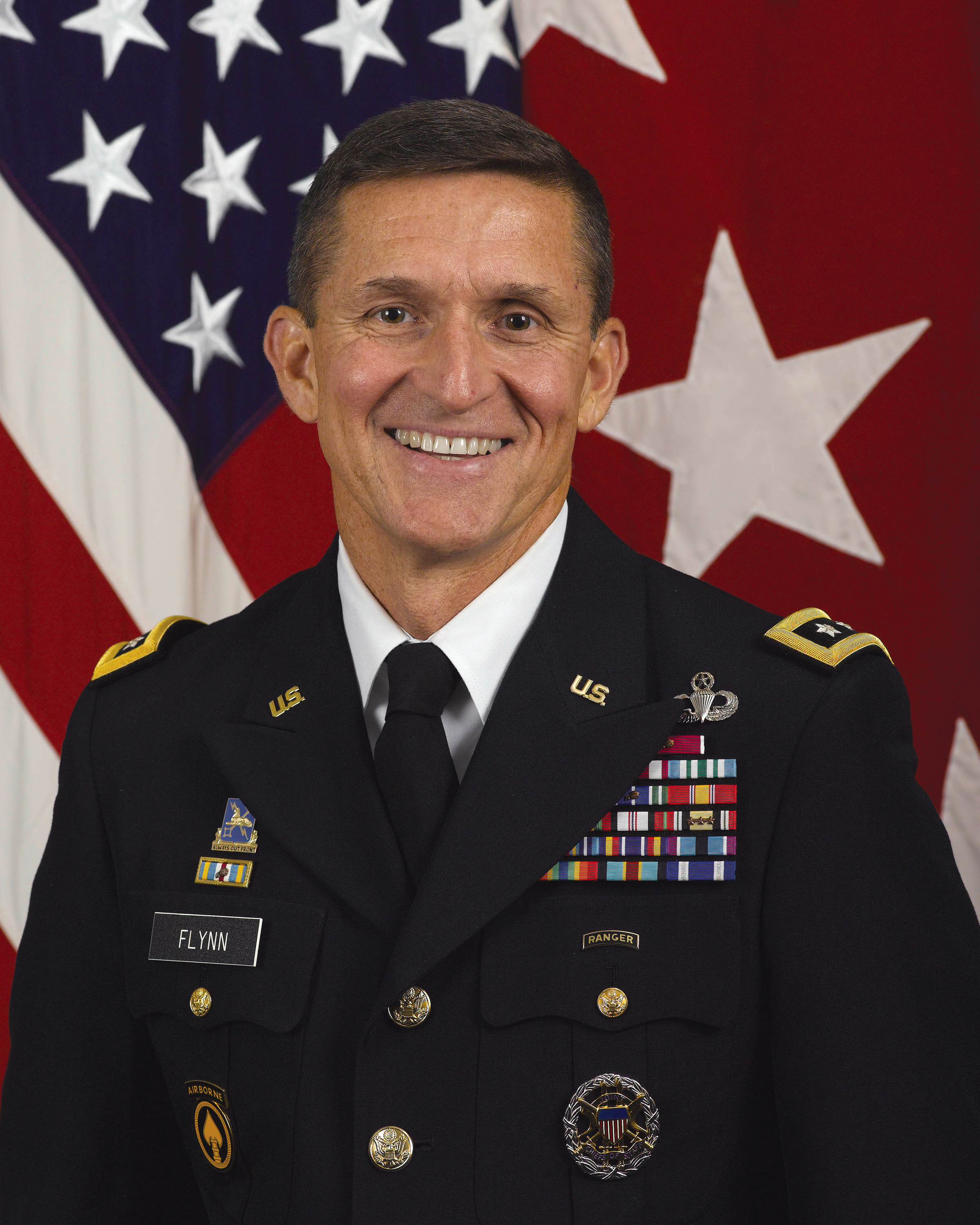
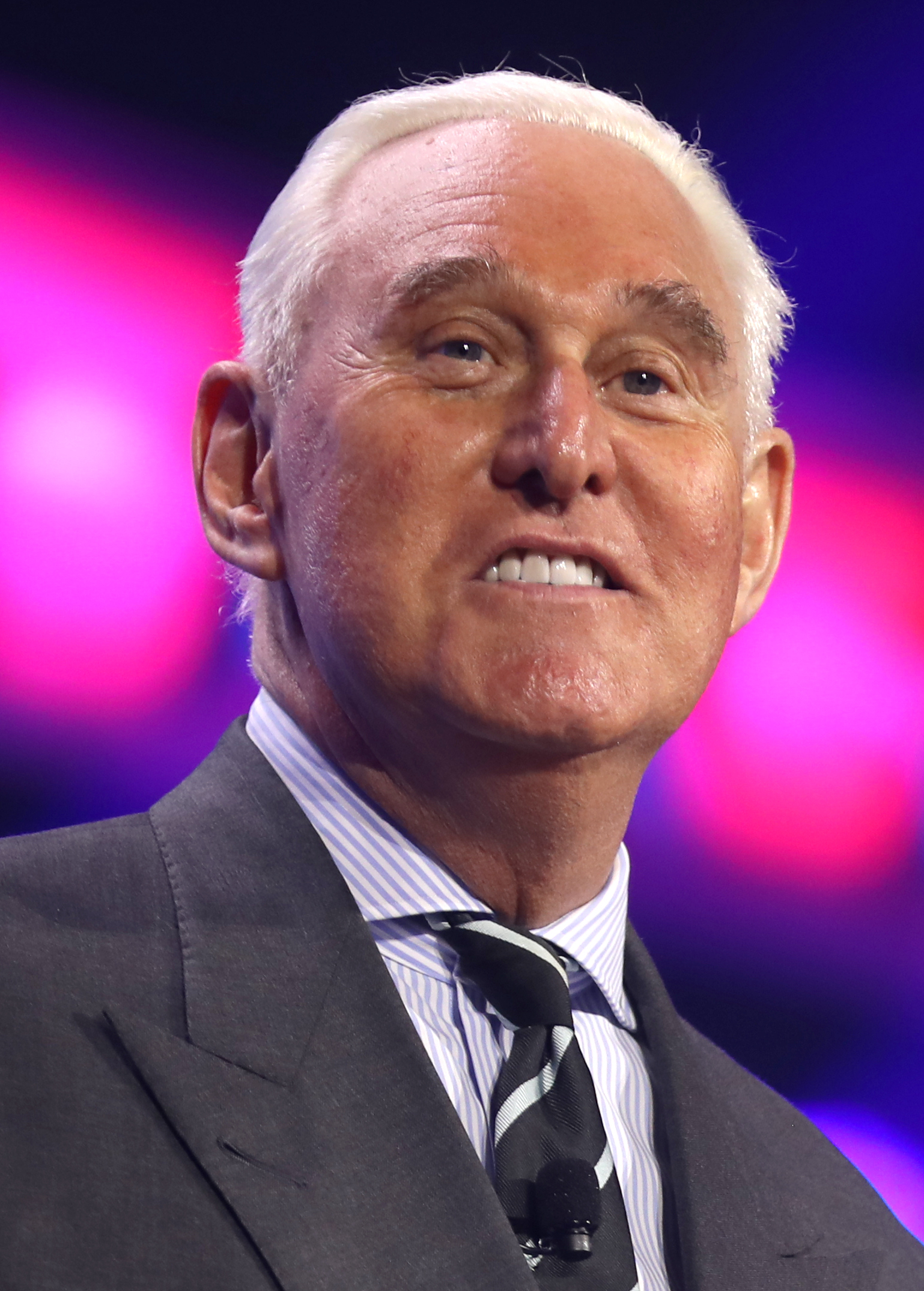
On January 5, Michael Flynn (left) and Roger Stone (right) spoke at a Trump rally near the Capitol. Both had received presidential pardons in the month prior to the attack.

On January 5, events related to overturning the election occurred on or near the National Mall in Washington, D.C., at places such as Freedom Plaza, the North Inner Gravel Walkway between 13th and 14th Streets, Area 9 across from the Russell Senate Office Building, and near the United States Supreme Court. On the night of January 5 and into the morning of January 6, at least ten people were arrested, several on weapons charges.

On January 5, Ray Epps, an individual with a history in the Arizona Oath Keepers, was filmed during two street gatherings urging people to go into the Capitol the next day, "peacefully", he said at one of the gatherings. Epps was filmed on January 6 telling people to "go to the Capitol". Epps had texted his nephew that he was "orchestrating" the flow into the Capitol building. Epps later claimed that he had been boasting about "directing" people towards the Capitol.

From 1:00 to 5:00 p.m. on January 5, a series of Trump rallies were held at Freedom Plaza. Notable speakers included Alex Jones, Michael Flynn, George Papadopoulos, and Roger Stone.

Flynn and Stone had received presidential pardons in prior weeks. On December 8, Trump pardoned retired US Army lieutenant general Michael Flynn, who had pleaded guilty to "willfully and knowingly" making false statements to the FBI about communications with the Russian ambassador. Flynn, a prominent QAnon proponent, participated in the D.C. events on January 5, while his brother, U.S. Army general Charles Flynn, would participate in a conference call on January 6 when he would refuse permission to deploy the National Guard after the breach of the Capitol. On December 23, Trump pardoned Roger Stone, who had been found guilty at trial of witness tampering, making false statements to Congress, and obstruction. Stone, who had longtime ties to the Proud Boys and Oath Keepers, employed Oath Keepers as security on January 5. Stone's Oath-Keeper driver, Roberto Minuta, was later convicted of seditious conspiracy for his role in plotting and executing the following day's attack.

=== January 5 meetings ===
In the evening of January 5, Trump's closest allies, including Michael Flynn, Corey Lewandowski, Alabama senator Tommy Tuberville, and Trump's sons Donald Jr. and Eric, met at the Trump International Hotel in Washington, D.C. Tuberville has since said that he did not attend the meeting, despite having been photographed in the hotel's lobby. According to Charles Herbster, who said he attended the meeting himself, attendees included Tuberville, Adam Piper, and Peter Navarro. Daniel Beck wrote that "Fifteen of us spent the evening with Donald Trump Jr., Kimberly Guilfoyle, Tommy Tuberville, Mike Lindell, Peter Navarro, and Rudy Giuliani". Herbster claimed to be standing "in the private residence of the President at Trump International with the following patriots who are joining me in a battle for justice and truth". He added David Bossie to the list of attendees.

=== Bombs placed ===
External image
- FBI images of bomb suspect

FBI compilation of bombs being placed

At 7:40 p.m. on January 5, someone was filmed carrying a bag through a neighborhood on South Capitol Street. At 7:52 p.m., the person was recorded sitting on a bench outside the DNC; the next day, a pipe bomb was discovered there, under a bush. In the footage, the suspect appears to zip a bag, stand and walk away. At 8:14, the suspect was filmed in an alley near the RNC, where a second pipe bomb was found the following day. Both bombs were placed within a few blocks of the Capitol. Nearing the second anniversary of the incident, a reward of $500,000 was offered. In December 2025, a suspect in connection with the incident was arrested by the FBI and told the FBI that he believed conspiracy theories about the 2020 election.

=== January 6 Trump rally ===
On January 6, the "Save America" rally (or "March to Save America", promoted as a "Save America March") took place on the Ellipse within the National Mall just south of the White House. The permit granted to Women for America First scheduled a first amendment rally "March for Trump", with speeches running from 9:00 a.m. to 3:30 p.m., with an additional hour for the conclusion of the rally and dispersal of participants.

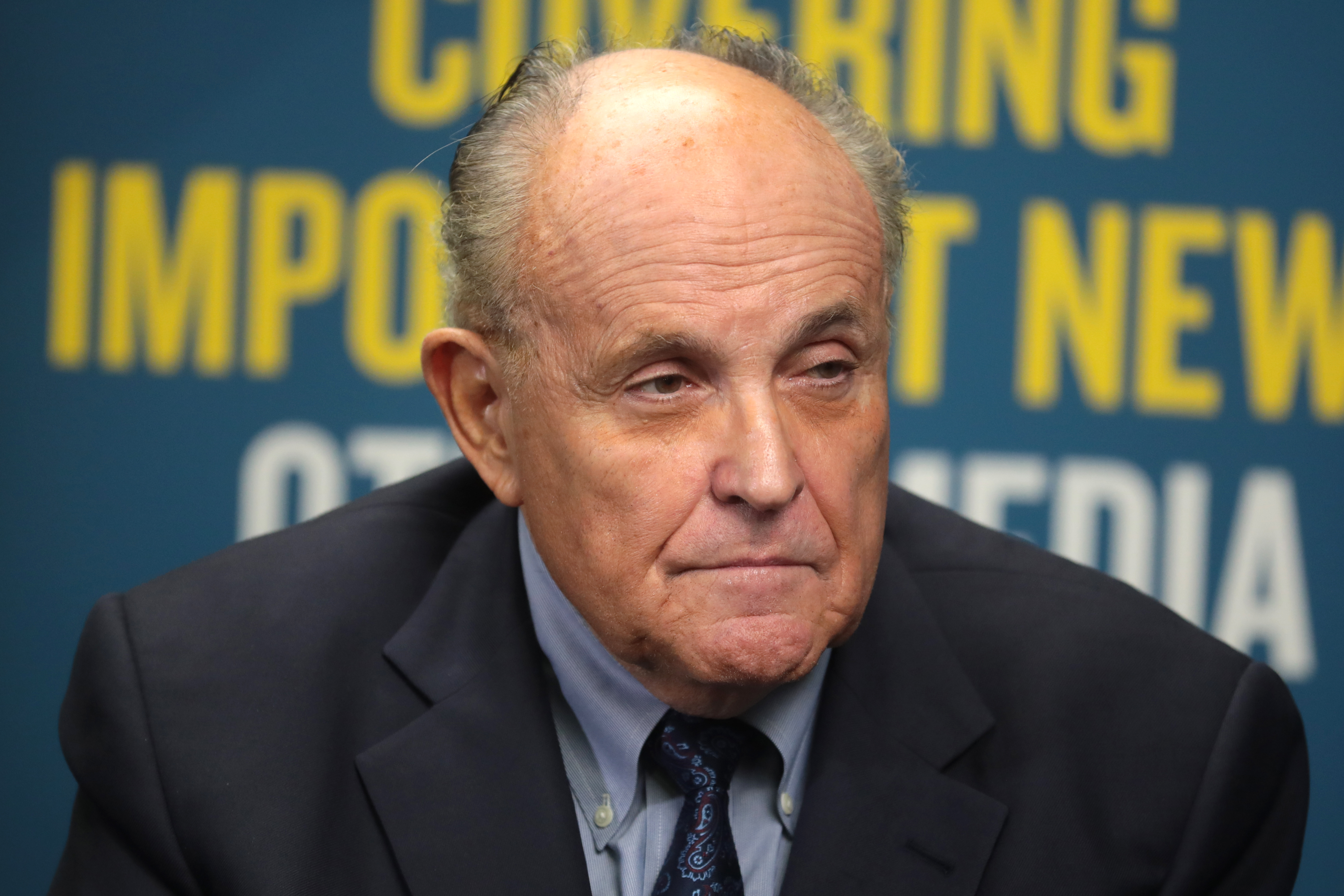
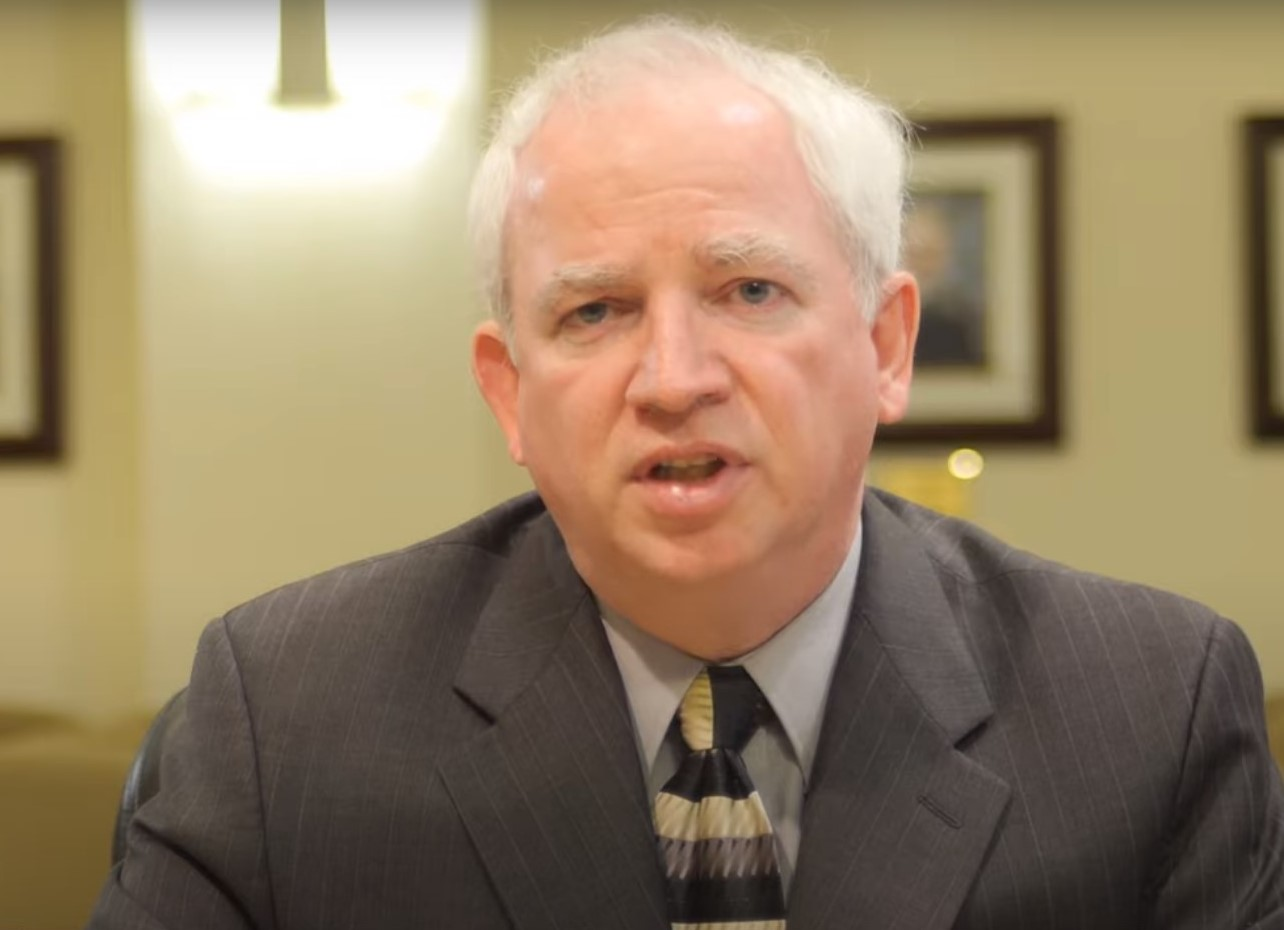
Speakers at the "Save America" rally included Rudy Giuliani (top) and John Eastman.

Trump supporters gathered on the Ellipse to hear speeches from Trump, Rudy Giuliani, and others, such as Chapman University School of Law professor John Eastman, who spoke, at least in part, based on his memorandums, which have been described as an instruction manual for a coup d'état. In a February court filing, Jessica Watkins, a member of the Oath Keepers, claimed she had acted as "security" at the rally in collaboration with the Secret Service. The Secret Service denied this, with Watkins later changing her story; in 2023, she was sentenced to 8 1/2 years in prison.

Mo Brooks was a featured speaker at the rally and spoke around 9 a.m., where he said, "Today is the day American patriots start taking down names and kicking ass". And later, "Are you willing to do what it takes to fight for America? Louder! Will you fight for America?"

Representative Madison Cawthorn said, "This crowd has some fight". Women for America First founder Amy Kremer told attendees, "it is up to you and I to save this Republic" and called on them to "keep up the fight". Trump's sons, Donald Jr. and Eric, along with Eric's wife Lara Trump, also spoke, naming and verbally attacking Republican congressmen and senators who were not supporting the effort to challenge the Electoral College vote, and promising to campaign against them in future primary elections. Donald Jr. said of Republican lawmakers, "If you're gonna be the zero and not the hero, we're coming for you".

Rudy Giuliani repeated conspiracy theories that voting machines used in the election were "crooked" and at 10:50 called for "trial by combat". Eastman asserted that balloting machines contained "secret folders" that altered voting results. (Note: A week later, he retired.) At 10:58, a Proud Boys contingent left the rally and marched toward the Capitol Building.

On January 6, the "Wild Protest" was organized by Stop The Steal and took place in Area 8, across from the Russell Senate Office Building. On January 6, the "Freedom Rally" was organized by Virginia Freedom Keepers, Latinos for Trump, and United Medical Freedom Super PAC at 300 First Street NE, across from the Russell Senate Office Building.

==== Trump's speech ====
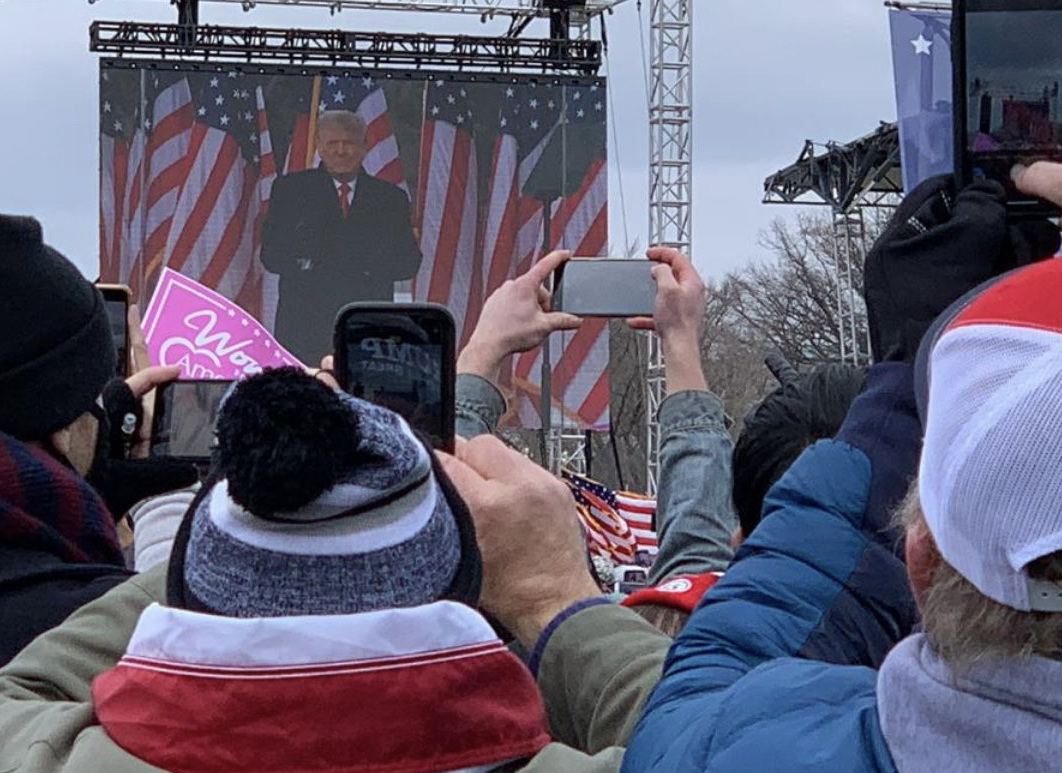
An image of Trump delivering his rally speech from behind a bulletproof shield was projected onto this screen at the rally

Starting at 11:58, from behind a bulletproof shield, President Trump gave a speech, declaring that he would "never concede" the election, criticizing the media, and calling for Pence to overturn the election results. His speech contained many falsehoods and misrepresentations that inflamed the crowd. Trump did not call on his supporters to use violence or enter the Capitol, but his speech was filled with violent imagery. On social media, Trump was suggesting that his supporters had the power to prevent Biden from taking office. One of his tweets, posted on January 6, 2021, at 5:43 a.m., was "Get smart Republicans. FIGHT". The same afternoon, Pence released a letter to Congress, in which he said he could not challenge Biden's victory.

Although the initial plan for the rally called for people to remain at the Ellipse until the counting of electoral slates was complete, the White House said they should march to the Capitol, as Trump repeatedly urged during his speech. Trump called for his supporters to "walk down to the Capitol" to "cheer on our brave senators and congressmen and women and we're probably not going to be cheering so much for some of them". He told the crowd that he would be with them, but he ultimately did not go to the Capitol. As to counting Biden's electoral votes, Trump said, "We can't let that happen" and suggested Biden would be an "illegitimate president". Referring to the day of the elections, Trump said, "most people would stand there at 9:00 in the evening and say, 'I want to thank you very much,' and they go off to some other life, but I said, 'Something's wrong here. Something's really wrong. [It] can't have happened.' And we fight. We fight like Hell and if you don't fight like Hell, you're not going to have a country anymore". He said the protesters would be "going to the Capitol and we're going to try and give [Republicans] the kind of pride and boldness that they need to take back our country". Trump also said, "you'll never take back our country with weakness. You have to show strength and you have to be strong. We have come to demand that Congress do the right thing and only count the electors who have been lawfully slated".

Trump denounced Representative Liz Cheney, saying, "We've got to get rid of the weak Congresspeople, the ones that aren't any good, the Liz Cheneys of the world". He called upon his supporters to "fight much harder" against "bad people"; told the crowd that "you are allowed to go by very different rules"; said that his supporters were "not going to take it any longer"; framed the moment as the last stand; suggested that Pence and other Republican officials put themselves in danger by accepting Biden's victory; and told the crowd he would march with them to the Capitol (but was prevented from doing so by his security detail). In addition to the twenty times he used the term "fight", Trump once used the term "peacefully", saying, "I know that everyone here will soon be marching over to the Capitol building to peacefully and patriotically make your voices heard".

During Trump's speech, his supporters chanted "Take the Capitol", "Taking the Capitol right now", "Invade the Capitol", "Storm the Capitol" and "Fight for Trump". Before Trump had finished speaking at 1:12 p.m., the Proud Boys had begun their attack on the Capitol and breached the outer perimeter of the Capitol grounds; the two pipe bombs had been discovered nearby.

== Attack on the Capitol ==
Police radio traffic during the attack

Just before the Proud Boys attacked the Capitol, pipe bombs were discovered nearby. Proud Boys, Oath Keepers, and other attackers besieged and breached the Capitol. Members of Congress barricaded themselves in the chamber, and one unarmed woman, airforce veteran Ashli Babbitt, was fatally shot by police while attempting to breach a barricade.

After officials at the Pentagon delayed deployment of the National Guard, citing concerns about optics, D.C. mayor Muriel Bowser requested assistance from Virginia governor Ralph Northam. By 3:15, Virginia State Police began arriving in D.C. After Vice President Pence and Congress were evacuated to secure locations, law enforcement cleared and secured the Capitol.

=== Proud Boys march to Capitol as mob assembles ===
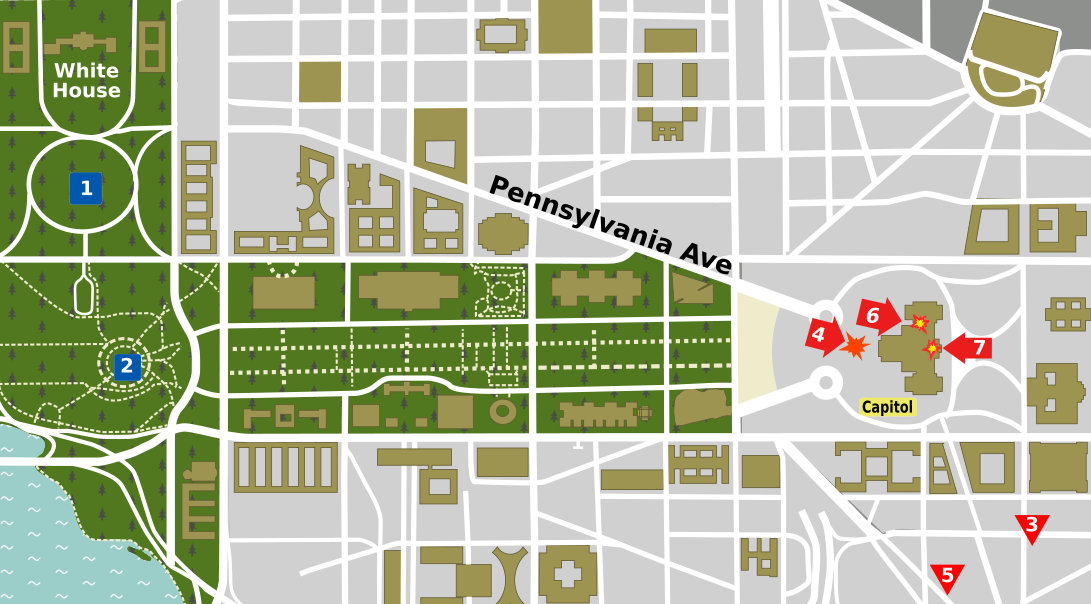
Map of major events by order; in blue are events generally considered to be prior to the attack, and in red are events that pertain to the attack itself. Highlighted events mark actions led by pro-Trump paramilitary groups, with unaffiliated Trump supporters surrounding the Capitol but concentrated on the west side.: (1) Beginning at 9 a.m., a rally was held at the White House Ellipse.; (2) Proud Boys assembled at the Washington Monument at 10 a.m. and departed for the Capitol around 10:30.; (3) About 12:40 p.m., a bomb was discovered outside the RNC.; (4) Minutes later, at 12:53 p.m., a crowd of Trump supporters, encouraged by the Proud Boys, breached a barricade on the outer perimeter in the west, gaining entry to Capitol grounds. Similar breaches on the same front would happen within minutes of each other.; (5) At 1:07 p.m., a second bomb was discovered outside the DNC.; (6) At 2:10 p.m., the Proud Boys–led mob breach the Capitol by breaking through windows on the west terrace with a stolen police riot shield and wooden beams.; (7) Oath Keepers marched up Capitol steps in a stack formation, amidst a crowd of Trump supporters attempting to enter on the east side; at 2:39 p.m., the mob breached the Capitol through a door to the rotunda.

At 10:30, over a hundred Proud Boys left the Washington Monument, led by Ethan Nordean and Joe Biggs. By 11:52, the group reached the Capitol and walked around it before doubling back to the west side, which allowed them to assess building defenses and look for weaknesses.

En route, comments from a Proud Boy served as an indicator of a plan to attack the Capitol, according to a documentary filmmaker on scene:

There's only one moment where that – the sort of facade of marching and protesting might have fallen, which is there was a – one of the Proud Boys called Milkshake and Eddie Block on his livestream catches Milkshake saying, well, let's go storm the Capitol with Nordean – Rufio – one of the leaders of the Proud Boys saying, you could keep that quiet, please, Milkshake. And then we continued on marching.

Around 12:30, a crowd of about 300 assembled east of the Capitol. Senator Josh Hawley, a leader of the group of lawmakers who vowed to challenge the Electoral College vote, greeted these protesters with a raised fist as he passed on his way to Congress's joint session. At 12:52, a group of Oath Keepers, wearing black hoodies with prominent logos, left the rally at the Ellipse and changed into Army Combat Uniforms, with helmets, on their way to the Capitol.

Shortly before 12:53, Nordean and Biggs marched the group of 200–300 Proud Boys to a barricade on the west side of the Capitol grounds near the Peace Monument. Biggs used a megaphone to lead the crowd in chants.

=== Bombs discovered near Capitol Complex ===
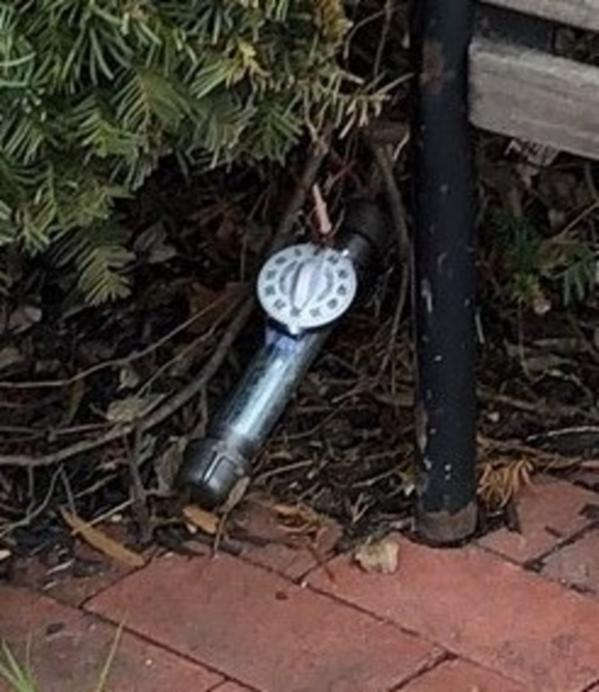
One of two pipe bombs discovered adjacent to the Capitol on January 6

Around 12:45 p.m., a bomb was discovered next to a building containing Republican National Committee (RNC) offices by a woman using the shared alleyway to access her apartment building's laundry room. She alerted RNC security, which investigated and summoned law enforcement; U.S. Capitol Police, FBI agents and the Bureau of Alcohol, Tobacco, Firearms and Explosives (ATF) all responded to the RNC bomb.

About thirty minutes later, while officers were still responding at the RNC, they were informed a second pipe bomb had been discovered under a bush at the Democratic National Committee (DNC) headquarters. Vice President-elect Kamala Harris was inside the DNC headquarters at the time the pipe bomb was discovered. Capitol Police began investigating the DNC pipe bomb at 1:07 p.m., and Harris was evacuated at approximately 1:14 p.m. The devices were of a similar design – about one foot (30 cm) in length. They were rendered safe by bomb squads; the pipe bomb at the RNC was neutralized at 3:33 p.m. and the pipe bomb at the DNC was neutralized at 4:36 p.m., according to a Capitol Police timeline. The bombs were fully functional and constructed of galvanized steel pipes, homemade black powder, and kitchen timers. The FBI stated that the bombs "were viable and could have been detonated, resulting in serious injury or death".

Sund told The Washington Post on January 10 that he suspected the pipe bombs were intentionally placed to draw police away from the Capitol; Representative Tim Ryan (D-Ohio) echoed the sentiment in a virtual news conference on January 11, saying, "[W]e do believe there was some level of coordination ... because of the pipe bombs ... that immediately drew attention away from the breach that was happening". The Inspector General of the Capitol Police later concluded, "If those pipe bombs were intended to be diversion... it worked". As the mob of Trump supporters attacked the Capitol, the discovery of the pipe bombs diverted a large number of already-outnumbered law enforcement officers from the Capitol. Capitol Police Inspector General Michael Bolton testified before Congress that "the bombs drew three teams to investigate" and left only one squad at the Capitol.

On January 7, 2025, Trump claimed that the FBI had identified a suspect. In February, podcaster Dan Bongino, who was about to step into the role of deputy director of the FBI, claimed the attempted pipe bomb had been "an inside job" and that "the F.B.I. knows who this person is". Ten months later, on December 4, 2025, Brian Cole, Jr. was arrested in Virginia. Investigators said there is no evidence that Cole has any connections to the US government, foreign countries, or political organizations. While he reportedly told the FBI that he believed conspiracy theories that claimed the 2020 election was rigged in Biden's favor, Cole began purchasing components of the bombs in 2019, and the FBI has not ascribed to him any specific motive. Cole told investigators that he "was going to a protest in support of [then President] Trump", but when asked why he planted bombs outside of both the RNC and DNC buildings, Cole said "I really don't like either party at this point" and claimed that the planned attack was unrelated to the counting of the 2020 election results. Bongino officially left his FBI position on January 3, 2026, and Cole was indicted on January 6, after which Cole's lawyers argued for his freedom under Trump's mass pardon of the rioters.

=== Attack begins near Peace Monument, led by Proud Boys ===
External videos
- Reneau, Natalie; Cooper, Stella; Feuer, Alan; Byrd, Aaron (June 17, 2022). "How the Proud Boys Breached the Capitol on Jan. 6: Rile Up the Normies". Visual Investigations. The New York Times.
- Inside the U.S. Capitol at the height of the siege | Visual Forensics. The Washington Post. January 16, 2021.

The Proud Boys contingent reached the west perimeter of the Capitol grounds, which was protected only by a sparse line of police in front of a temporary fence. Other Trump supporters arrived, adding to a growing crowd. The Proud Boys coordinated their attacks "from the first moment of violence to multiple breaches of the Capitol while leaving the impression that it was just ordinary protesters leading the charge". Proud Boys targeted an access point and riled up the previously peaceful crowd. In a "tipping point", a man later identified as Ryan Samsel approached Joe Biggs and talked with him, even embracing him. Samsel told the FBI that Biggs "encouraged him to push at the barricades and that when he hesitated, the Proud Boys leader flashed a gun, questioned his manhood and repeated his demand to move upfront and challenge the police". Proud Boy Dominic Pezzola recalled seeing Biggs flash a handgun and goading Samsel, telling him to "defend his manhood" by attacking the police line, but later tried to retract this statement. Samsel talked to Oath Keeper Ray Epps in the same time frame, with Samsel and Epps stating that Epps was attempting to calm Samsel down and dissuade him from attacking police as Biggs was encouraging him to do. Samsel later changed his story. Shortly after speaking to Epps and Biggs, Samsel became the first to violently attack police. Officer Caroline Edwards described the attack:

Ms. Edwards described how a Proud Boys leader named Joseph Biggs encouraged another man to approach the bike rack barricade where she was posted. That man, Ryan Samsel, she said, pushed the bike rack over, causing her to hit her head and lose consciousness. But before she blacked out, Ms. Edwards recalled seeing "a war scene" playing out in front of her. Police officers were bleeding and throwing up, she recalled. "It was carnage", she said. "It was chaos".

Video showed Edwards being pushed back behind a bicycle rack as Proud Boys pushed barricades towards her, knocking her off her feet and causing her to hit her head on the steps.

Bodycam video taken at the U.S. Capitol on January 6

The Proud Boys led the charge toward the Capitol, to the next police line, repeating the same tactics: identifying access points, riling up protesters, and sometimes joining in the violence. When met with resistance, leaders reassessed, and teams of Proud Boys targeted new entry points.

Around 1pm, hundreds of Trump supporters clashed with a line of officers and pushed through barriers along the Capitol perimeter. The crowd swept past barriers and officers, with members of the mob spraying officers with chemical agents or hitting them with lead pipes. Many rioters walked up the external stairways, while some resorted to ropes and makeshift ladders. Police blocked the entrance to a tunnel at the lower west terrace, where rioters waged a three-hour fight to enter. To gain access to the Capitol, several rioters scaled the west wall. Representative Zoe Lofgren, aware rioters had reached the Capitol steps, could not reach Capitol police chief Steven Sund by phone. House sergeant-at-arms Paul D. Irving told Lofgren the doors to the Capitol were locked and "nobody can get in".

Telephone logs show Sund had been coordinating additional resources from various agencies. Sund's first call was to the D.C. Metropolitan Police, who arrived within 15 minutes. Sund called Irving and Stenger at 12:58 and asked for an emergency declaration required to call in the National Guard; they told Sund they would "run it up the chain", but approval was withheld for over an hour.

After his speech concluded at 1:00 p.m. Trump ordered his Secret Service detail to drive him to the Capitol. When they refused, Trump reportedly assaulted his Secret Service driver, lunging for the man's throat.

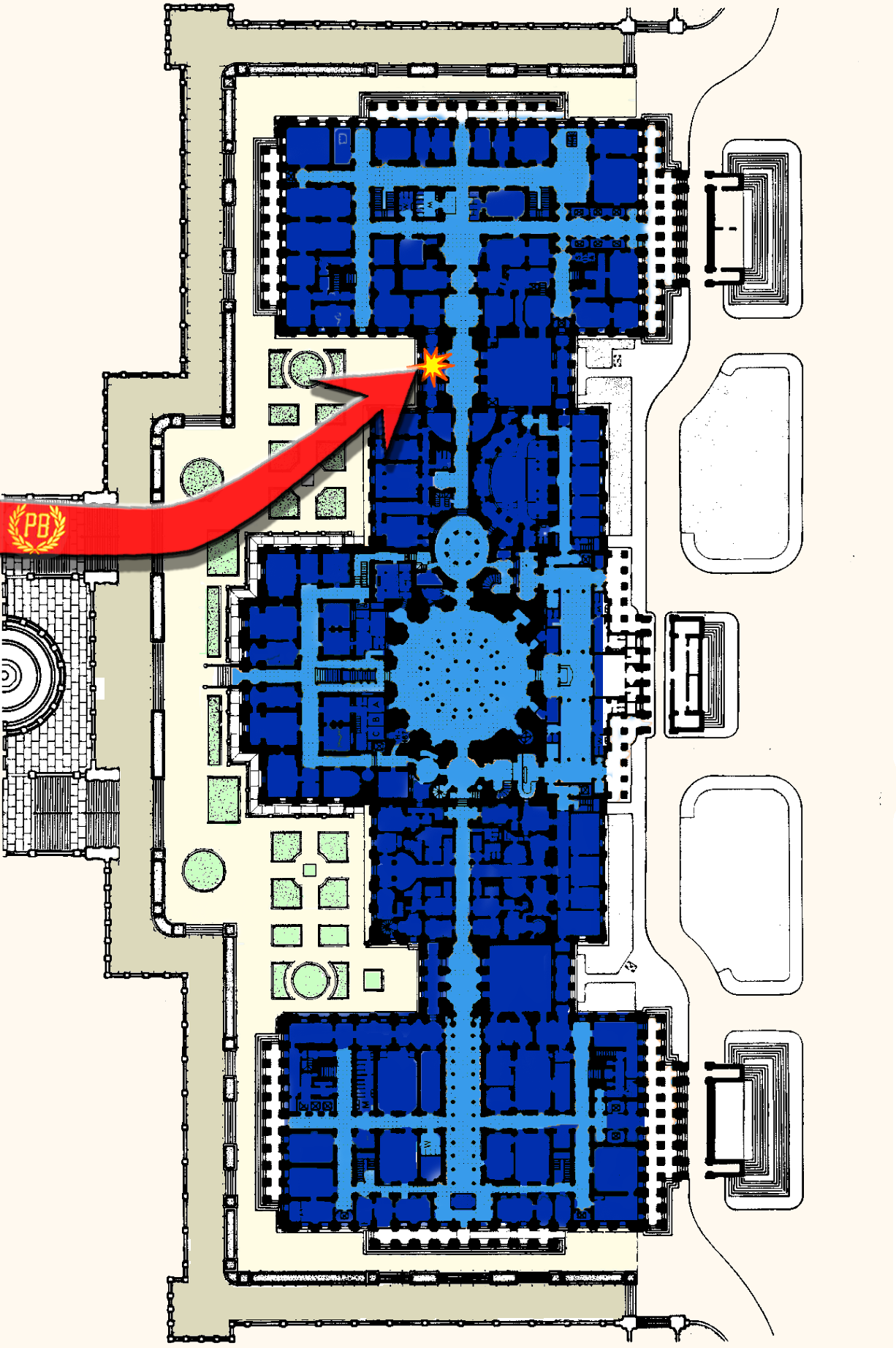
On January 6, Joe Biggs and other Proud Boys led the "tip of the spear" to breach the Capitol building. The LA Times noted that "whether by sheer luck, real-time trial and error, or advance knowledge", attackers ran past 15 reinforced windows, "making a beeline" for the recessed area near the Senate where two unreinforced windows and two doors with unreinforced glass were the only protection from attack.

Around 1:12 p.m., reinforcements from the MPD, equipped with crowd control gear, arrived on the lower west terrace. From 1:25 to 1:28, three different groups of Proud Boys leaders were recorded marching in stack formations away from the newly reinforced police line. After about fifteen minutes of observing, the Proud Boys went back on the attack, targeting new access points that were poorly defended. Ronald Loehrke and other Proud Boys led a contingent to the east side of the Capitol. Proud Boys again used distraction and teamwork to remove barricades, prompting the previously peaceful crowd on the east side to overrun barriers along the police line.

On the west side, Joe Biggs led a team of Proud Boys that targeted the stairs covered by temporary scaffolding. Within minutes of Biggs's arrival, a team of Proud Boys approached the entrance to the scaffolding and attacked police. Proud Boy Daniel "Milkshake" Scott led the charge, and a 20-minute battle for the scaffolding ensued.

At 1:50 p.m., the on-scene MPD incident commander declared a riot. At 1:58, Capitol Police officers removed a barricade on the northeast side of the Capitol, allowing hundreds of protestors to stream onto the grounds.

=== Attackers on west terrace breach Senate Wing hallway ===
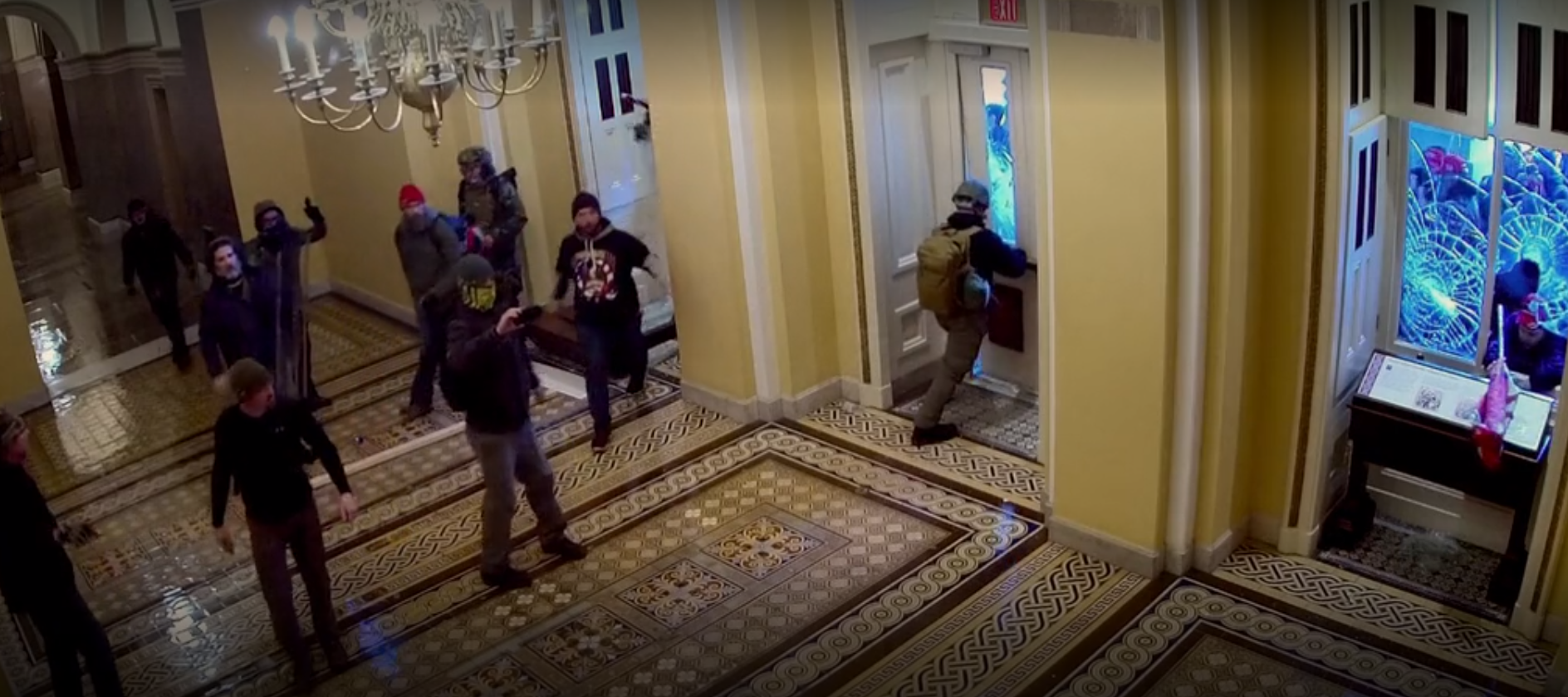
Proud Boy leader Dominic Pezzola (top) using a stolen police riot shield to breach the Capitol at 2:11, allowing attackers including Pezzola, Doug Jensen, Joe Biggs and others to stream into the building (middle). A lone Capitol Police officer (bottom), Eugene Goodman, realizing he was steps away from the still-unsealed Senate chamber doors, shoved attacker Doug Jensen, leading the mob away from the Senate and towards a line of waiting Capitol Police reinforcements.

Just before 2:00 p.m., attackers reached the doors and windows of the Capitol and attempted to break in. The Los Angeles Times observed that "whether by sheer luck, real-time trial and error, or advance knowledge", the first attackers to break through the police line onto the upper west terrace ran past 15 reinforced windows, "making a beeline" for the recessed area near the Senate where unreinforced windows and doors with unreinforced glass were the only protection from attack. At 2:11, Proud Boy leader Dominic Pezzola used a police riot shield to smash an un-reinforced window on the west side of the Capitol, breaching the building. By 2:13, the Capitol was breached. (Note: Attributed to multiple sources.) Although most of the Capitol's windows had been reinforced, attackers targeted those that remained as single-pane glass and could be broken easily. Joe Biggs and other Proud Boy leaders had entered the Capitol by 2:14. A news crew from ITV followed the rioters into the Capitol, the only broadcaster to do so.

At 2:13, Pence was removed from the Senate chamber by a Secret Service agent, who brought him to an office about 100 feet (30 m) from the landing. Pence's wife Karen Pence, daughter Charlotte Pence Bond, and brother, Representative Greg Pence, were in the Capitol. As Pence and his family were escorted from the Senate chamber to a nearby hideaway, they came within a minute of being visible to rioters on a staircase 100 feet (30 m) away.

Unaccompanied by other officers, Capitol Police officer Eugene Goodman confronted the mob. He has been cited for heroism in baiting and diverting the rioters away from the Senate chamber in the minutes before the chamber could be safely evacuated. As the crowd of rioters reached a landing from which there was an unimpeded path to the chamber, Goodman pushed the lead attacker, Doug Jensen, and then deliberately retreated away from the chamber, enticing the crowd to chase him in another direction. One media report described his actions as follows:

In short, he tricked them, willingly becoming the rabbit to their wolf pack, pulling them away from the chambers where armed officers were waiting, avoiding tragedy and saving lives. Lives which include their own.

Those present, including legislators and members of the press, praised Goodman for his quick thinking and brave actions. Senator Ben Sasse credited Goodman with having "single-handedly prevented untold bloodshed". Goodman's actions were captured in video footage. The footage of Goodman went viral on the internet, receiving more than 10 million views. A second video of Goodman's confrontation with the crowd was published. Goodman was awarded the Presidential Citizens Medal.

=== Evacuation of leadership amid Capitol lockdown ===
C-SPAN broadcast of the Senate going into recess after Capitol is breached

Surveillance video of Mike Pence being evacuated from the Capitol

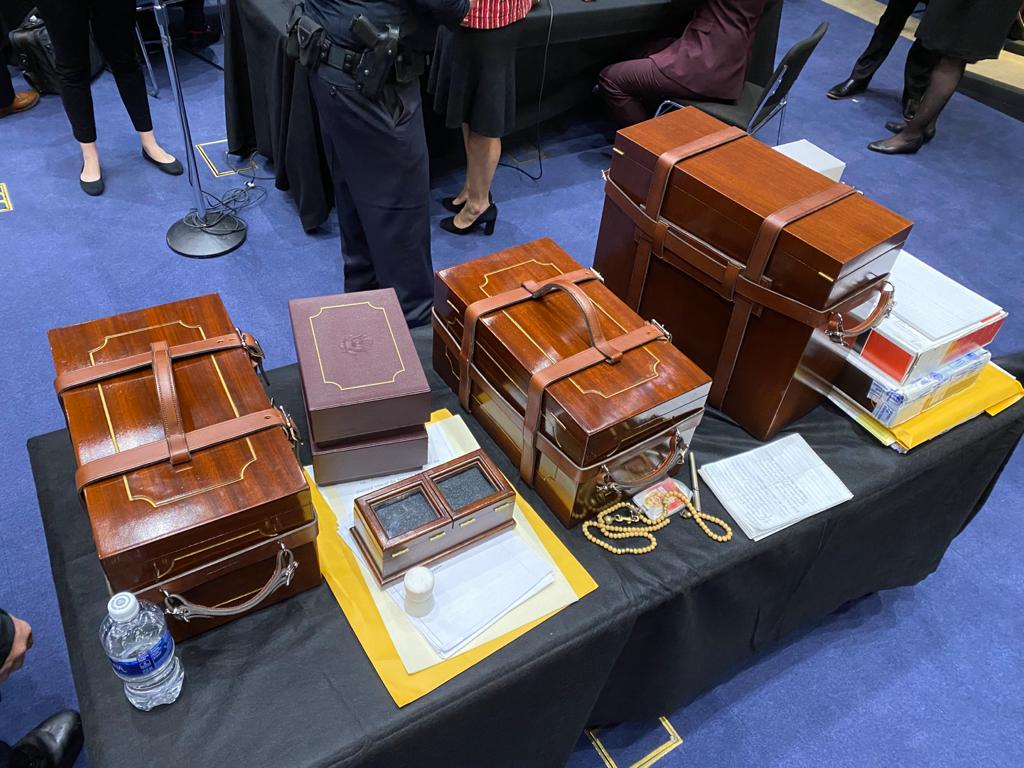
Congressional staffers removed the Electoral College certificates from the Senate floor as it was evacuated.

At 2:13, the Senate recessed, and the doors were locked. A minute later, the rioters reached the doors to the gallery above the chamber. Banging could be heard from outside as rioters attempted to break through the doors. Speaker Pelosi was escorted out of the House chamber.

A police officer carrying a semi-automatic weapon appeared on the floor and stood between Senate majority leader Mitch McConnell and minority leader Chuck Schumer. Senator Mitt Romney exasperatedly threw up his hands and criticized fellow Republicans challenging Biden's electoral votes, yelling to them, "This is what you've gotten, guys". Members of Senate Parliamentarian Elizabeth MacDonough's staff carried the boxes of Electoral College votes and documentation out of the chamber to hidden safe rooms.

Due to security threat inside: immediately, move inside your office, take emergency equipment, lock the doors, take shelter.

— Capitol Police alert

At 2:26, Pence's Secret Service detail evacuated him and his family from their hideaway near the Senate downstairs, towards a secure location. After his evacuation, Pence's detail wanted to move him from the Capitol building, but Pence refused to get in the car. Addressing the agent in charge of his detail, Tim Giebels, Pence said, "I trust you, Tim, but you're not driving the car. If I get in that vehicle, you guys are taking off. I'm not getting in the car".

All buildings in the complex were subsequently locked down, with no entry or exit allowed. Capitol staff were asked to shelter in place; those outside were advised to "seek cover". As the mob roamed the Capitol, lawmakers, aides, and staff took shelter in offices and closets. Aides to Mitch McConnell, barricaded in a room just off a hallway, heard a rioter outside the door "praying loudly", asking for "the evil of Congress [to] be brought to an end". The rioters entered and ransacked the office of the Senate Parliamentarian.

With senators still in the chamber, Trump called Senator Tommy Tuberville and told him to do more to block the counting of Biden's electoral votes, but the call had to be cut off when the Senate chamber was evacuated at 2:30. (Note: Attributed to multiple sources.) After evacuation, the mob took control of the chamber, with armed men carrying plastic handcuffs and others posing with raised fists on the Senate dais Pence had left minutes earlier. Staff and reporters were taken by secure elevators to the basement, to a bunker constructed following the attempted attack on the Capitol in 2001. Evacuees were redirected en route after the bunker was infiltrated by the mob.

The Sergeant-at-Arms of the Senate, Michael C. Stenger, accompanied a group of senators, including Lindsey Graham and Joe Manchin, to a secure location in a Senate office building. Once safe, the lawmakers were "furious" with Stenger; Graham asked him, "How does this happen? How does this happen?" and added that they "[are] not going to be run out by a mob".

Meanwhile, the House recessed at 2:18. Amid the security concerns, Representative Dean Phillips yelled, "This is because of you!" at his Republican colleagues. According to her book, Oath and Honor, "[t]he C-SPAN cameras captured [Representative Cheney] as [she] pointed at [Representative Jason Smith] and said 'You did this.' [She] was angry. 'You did this.'" The House resumed debate at 2:26. After Gosar finished, the House again went into recess at 2:29 after rioters entered the House wing and attempted to enter the Speaker's Lobby just outside the chamber. Lawmakers were still inside and being evacuated, with Pelosi, Kevin McCarthy, and others taken to a secure location. With violence breaking out, Capitol security advised members of Congress to take cover. Members of Congress inside the House chamber were told to don gas masks as law enforcement began using tear gas within the building. (Note: Attributed to multiple sources.)

ABC News reported that shots were fired within the Capitol. An armed standoff took place at the front door of the chamber of the House of Representatives: as the mob attempted to break in, federal law enforcement officers inside drew their guns and pointed them toward the doors, which were barricaded with furniture. In a stairway, one officer fired a shot at a man coming toward him. Photographer Erin Schaff said that, from the Capitol Rotunda, she ran upstairs, where rioters grabbed her press badge. Police found her, and because her pass had been stolen, held her at gunpoint before colleagues intervened.

The chief of staff for Representative Ayanna Pressley claimed that when the congresswoman and staff barricaded themselves in her office and attempted to call for help with duress buttons they had used during safety drills, "[e]very panic button...had been torn out – the whole unit". A Democratic aide to the House Administration Committee emailed Greg Sargent of The Washington Post claiming the missing buttons were due to a "clerical screw-up" resulting from Pressley's swapping offices. Representative Jamaal Bowman tweeted that there were no duress buttons in his office, but acknowledged he was only three days into his term and the buttons were installed a week later.

Multiple rioters, using the cameras on their cell phones, documented themselves occupying the Capitol and the offices of representatives, vandalizing the offices of Speaker Pelosi, accessing secure computers, and stealing a laptop.

=== Oath Keepers arrive and breach Rotunda ===
Shortly after 2:00, Oath Keepers leader Stewart Rhodes arrived on the restricted Capitol grounds. At 2:30, a team of Oath Keepers ("Stack One", which included Meggs, Harrelson, Watkins, Hackett, and Moerschel), clad in paramilitary clothing, marched in a stack formation up the east steps to join the mob already besieging the Capitol. At 2:38, those doors to the Capitol Rotunda were breached, and "Stack One" entered the building alongside other attackers. A second group ("Stack Two") entered the Capitol through those same doors at 3:15. Throughout the attack, Oath Keepers maintained a "Quick reaction Force" ready to deliver an arsenal to the group if called upon.

Meanwhile, also at 2:38, Proud Boy founder Enrique Tarrio made a social media post writing, "Don't fucking leave". In response to a member who asked "Are we a militia yet?", Tarrio replied, "Yep... Make no mistake... We did this..."

=== Ashli Babbitt killed by police while attempting to breach Speaker's Lobby ===
External videos
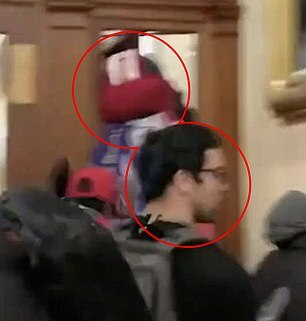
- After Zachary Jordan Alam (circled in red, bottom right) smashed the window with his helmet, Ashli Babbitt (circled in red, top left) attempted to breach the Speaker's Lobby by climbing through a window toward the fleeing congress.
- Footage of attempted breach of the Speaker's Lobby and subsequent shooting of Babbitt.

At 2:44 p.m., law enforcement near the House Chamber was trying to "defend two fronts", and "a lot of members [of Congress] and staff that were in danger". While some lawmakers remained trapped in the House gallery, House members and staff from the floor were being evacuated by Capitol Police, protected from the attackers by a barricaded door with glass windows.

As lawmakers evacuated, an attacker smashed a glass window beside the barricaded door. Lieutenant Michael Byrd aimed his weapon, prompting attackers to repeatedly warn "he's got a gun". Police and Secret Service warned "Get back! Get down! Get out of the way!". Ashli Babbitt, wearing a Trump flag as a cape, began to climb through the shattered window, prompting Byrd to fire a single shot, hitting the attacker in the shoulder.

Mob members immediately began to leave the scene, making room for a police emergency response team to administer aid. Babbitt had entered the building through the breach on the upper west terrace. She was evacuated to Washington Hospital Center where she died. Footage of the shooting circulated.

=== Attack on the tunnel ===
Officer Daniel Hodges crushed in doorway of the Tunnel, c. 3:15

Around 3:15, MPD officer Daniel Hodges was crushed in a door while defending the Capitol tunnel from attackers. One of his attackers was sentenced to 7.5 years in prison.

At 3:21, MPD officer Michael Fanone was pulled into the mob and assaulted—dragged down the Capitol steps, beaten with pipes, stunned with a Taser, sprayed with chemical irritants, and threatened with his own sidearm. Fanone was carried unconscious back into the tunnel. He suffered burns, a heart attack, traumatic brain injuries, and post-traumatic stress disorder. One of the men who attacked Fanone with a stun gun was sentenced to 12.5 years in prison.

By 3:39 p.m., fully-equipped riot officers from Virginia had arrived and began defending the tunnel, using flashbang munitions to clear the area of attackers.

=== Police clear the Capitol and Congress reconvenes ===
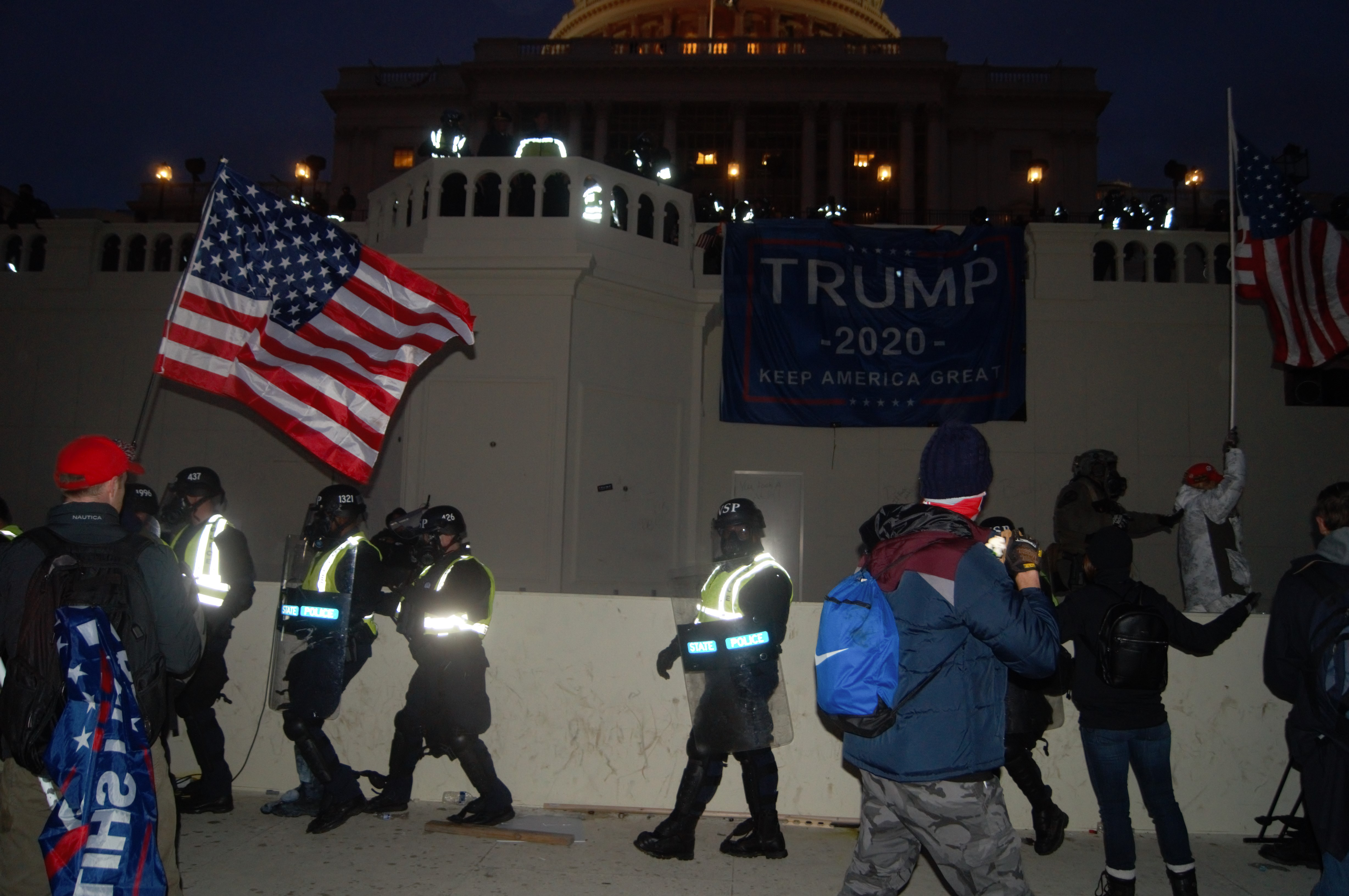
Reinforcements guard the Capitol after rioters were pushed out of the building.

A combined force of Capitol and Metropolitan police began an operation to clear the Capitol. By 2:49, the Crypt was cleared, and the mob outside the Speaker's Lobby was cleared by 2:57. At 3:25, law enforcement, including a line of MPD officers in riot gear, proceeded to clear the Rotunda; and by 3:40, rioters had mostly been pushed out onto West Plaza.

At 4:22 p.m., Trump issued a video message to supporters on social media, "We have to have peace. So go home. We love you. You're very special". At 5:08, Army senior leaders relayed to Major General Walker the secretary of defense's permission to deploy the DC National Guard to the Capitol; The first contingent of 155 Guard members, dressed in riot gear, began arriving at the Capitol at 5:20. By 6 p.m., the building was cleared of rioters, and bomb squads swept the Capitol.

At 8:06 p.m., Pence called the Senate back into session, and at 9:02, Pelosi did the same in the House. Biden's victory was confirmed by Pence shortly before 03:40 a.m. on January 7, and the joint session was dissolved at 03:44.

== Federal officials' conduct ==
=== Trump's conduct ===
Statement by Donald Trump during the conflict, two hours after the building had been breached

Trump was in the West Wing of the White House at the time of the attack. He was "initially pleased" and refused to intercede when his supporters breached the Capitol. Staffers reported that Trump had been "impossible to talk to throughout the day". Concerned that Trump may have committed treason through his actions, White House Counsel Pat Cipollone reportedly advised administration officials to avoid contact with Trump and ignore any illegal orders that could further incite the attack, in order to limit their prosecutorial liability under the Sedition Act of 1918.

Shortly after 2:00 p.m. EST, as the attack was ongoing and after senators had been evacuated, Trump placed calls to Republican senators (first Mike Lee of Utah, then Tommy Tuberville of Alabama), asking them to make more objections to the counting of the electoral votes. Pence was evacuated by the Secret Service from the Senate chamber around 2:13. At 2:47 p.m., as Trump's supporters violently clashed with police at the Capitol, Trump's account tweeted, "Please support our Capitol Police and Law Enforcement. They are truly on the side of our Country. Stay peaceful!" The Washington Post later reported that Trump did not want to include the words "stay peaceful", and it later emerged that this message was sent by Deputy Chief of Staff Dan Scavino.

During the attack, Chief of Staff Mark Meadows received messages from Donald Trump Jr., as well as Fox News hosts Sean Hannity, Laura Ingraham, and Brian Kilmeade, urging him to tell Trump to condemn the mayhem, or risk destroying his legacy. By 3:10, pressure was building on Trump to condemn supporters engaged in the attack. By 3:25, Trump tweeted, "I am asking for everyone at the U.S. Capitol to remain peaceful. No violence! Remember, WE are the Party of Law & Order – respect the Law and our great men and women in Blue", but he refused to call upon the crowd to disperse. By 3:40, several congressional Republicans called upon Trump to more specifically condemn violence and to tell his supporters to end the occupation of the Capitol.

At some point on January 6, Trump formally withdrew his nomination of acting DHS secretary Chad Wolf, transmitting his withdrawal to the Senate.

By 3:50 p.m., White House Press Secretary Kayleigh McEnany said that the National Guard and "other federal protective services" had been deployed. At 4:06 p.m. on national television, President-elect Biden called for President Trump to end the attack. At 4:22 p.m., Trump issued a video message on social media that Twitter, Facebook, and YouTube later took down. In it, he repeated his false claims of electoral fraud, praised his supporters, and told them to "go home". At 6:25 p.m., Trump tweeted: "These are the things and events that happen when a sacred landslide election victory is so unceremoniously & viciously stripped away from great patriots who have been badly & unfairly treated for so long" and then issued a call: "Go home with love & in peace. Remember this day forever!" At 7:00, Rudy Giuliani placed a second call to Lee's number and left a voicemail intended for Tuberville, urging him to make more objections to the electoral votes as part of a bid "to try to just slow it down".

==== Inflammatory speech while knowing of weapons ====
During the "Save America" rally, Trump delivered a speech filled with violent imagery while knowing that some of his supporters were armed. He demanded that armed supporters be allowed to enter the rally, and later instructed the crowd to march on the US Capitol. In a December 21, 2021, statement, Trump falsely called the attack a "completely unarmed protest". The Department of Justice said in a January 2022 official statement that over 75 people had been charged, in relation to the attack, with entering a restricted area while armed with "a dangerous or deadly weapon", including some armed with guns, stun guns, knives, batons, baseball bats, axes, and chemical sprays. According to testimony from Trump White House aide Cassidy Hutchinson, a Secret Service official had warned Trump that protestors were carrying weapons, but Trump wanted the magnetometers used to detect metallic weapons removed so armed supporters could enter the rally. According to Hutchinson, when warned, Trump said:

I don't fucking care that they have weapons, they're not here to hurt me. They're not here to hurt me. Take the fucking mags away. Let my people in. They can march to the Capitol from here, let the people in and take the mags away.

==== Allegation of assaulting a Secret Service driver ====
In June 2022, Cassidy Hutchinson testified that she was told by then-White House deputy chief of staff Anthony Ornato that after Trump got into the presidential SUV following his rally, hoping to drive to the Capitol as his supporters marched there, his lead Secret Service agent, Robert Engel, told him it was too dangerous and informed him they were returning to the White House. Hutchinson said Ornato told her Trump became irate, attempted to grab the steering wheel of the vehicle, and lunged at Engel's clavicle. She testified Engel was present with Ornato as he related the incident but never contradicted the account. Three days after Hutchinson's testimony, CNN reported that it had spoken with two Secret Service agents who had heard accounts of the incident from multiple other agents since February 2021, including Trump's driver. Although details differed, agents confirmed there was an angry confrontation, with one agent relating that Trump "tried to lunge over the seat – for what reason, nobody had any idea", but no one asserted Trump attacked Engel. A separate Secret Service official told CNN that Engel denied that Trump grabbed at the steering wheel or lunged toward an agent on his detail, and that Ornato denied telling Hutchinson that. The same day, Politico reported that during an early 2022 deposition Engel told the committee that he had kept his full account of the incident from his Secret Service colleagues for at least fourteen months. On July 14, 2022, CNN published a corroborating account by a Metropolitan Police officer in the motorcade, who told of the "heated exchange" Trump had with his Secret Service detail when they refused to take him to the Capitol following his rally on January 6.

==== Endangering Mike Pence ====
On January 5, after Vice President Mike Pence refused to participate in the fake electors plot, Trump warned that he would have to criticize him publicly. This prompted Pence's chief of staff to become concerned for Pence's safety and to alert Pence's Secret Service detail to the perceived threat. At 3:23 a.m. on the morning of January 6, QAnon leader Ron Watkins posted a tweet accusing Pence of orchestrating a coup against Trump and linked to a blog post which called for "the immediate arrest of [Pence], for treason".

At 2:24, while Pence was in hiding in the Capitol, Trump tweeted that Pence "didn't have the courage to do what should have been done". Trump followers on far-right social media called for Pence to be hunted down, and the mob began chanting, "Where is Pence?" and "Find Mike Pence!" Outside, the mob chanted, "Hang Mike Pence!", which some crowds continued to chant as they stormed the Capitol. At least three rioters were overheard by a reporter as saying that they wanted to find Pence and execute him as a "traitor" by hanging him from a tree outside the building. One official recalled that: "The members of the [Vice President's Secret Service detail] at this time were starting to fear for their own lives... they're screaming and saying things like 'say goodbye to the family'". Alerted by a staffer to the threat against Pence, Trump reportedly replied "So what?" Witnesses report that White House chief of staff Mark Meadows told colleagues that Trump expressed frustration about Pence being taken to safety and implying that Pence should be hanged. Pence later argued that Trump's "reckless words endangered my family and everyone at the Capitol that day".

On April 3, 2025, the John F. Kennedy Library Foundation announced Pence as the recipient of the JFK Profile in Courage Award "for putting his life and career on the line to ensure the constitutional transfer of presidential power on Jan. 6, 2021".

==== Failure to end the attack ====
In a televised January 6 Attack congressional hearing on June 9, 2022, congresspersons Bennie Thompson and Liz Cheney stated that Trump did nothing to stop the attack despite numerous urgent requests that he intervene. They described Trump's inaction as a "dereliction of duty". Cheney said that Trump had attempted to overturn a free and fair democratic election by promoting a seven-part conspiracy. According to Representative Thompson, "Jan. 6 was the culmination of an attempted coup, a brazen attempt, as one rioter put it shortly after Jan. 6, to overthrow the government... The violence was no accident. It represents Trump's last stand, most desperate chance to halt the transfer of power". Trump, according to the committee, "lied to the American people, ignored all evidence refuting his false fraud claims, pressured state and federal officials to throw out election results favoring his challenger, encouraged a violent mob to storm the Capitol and even signaled support for the execution of his own vice president".

After the June 9 hearing, Congressman Tom Rice reiterated his long-held view of Trump's conduct, saying, "He watched it happen. He reveled in it. And he took no action to stop it. I think he had a duty to try to stop it, and he failed in that duty".

=== Capitol Police leadership's failure to prepare ===
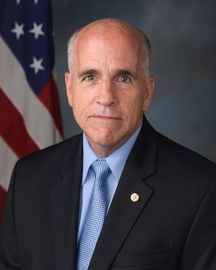
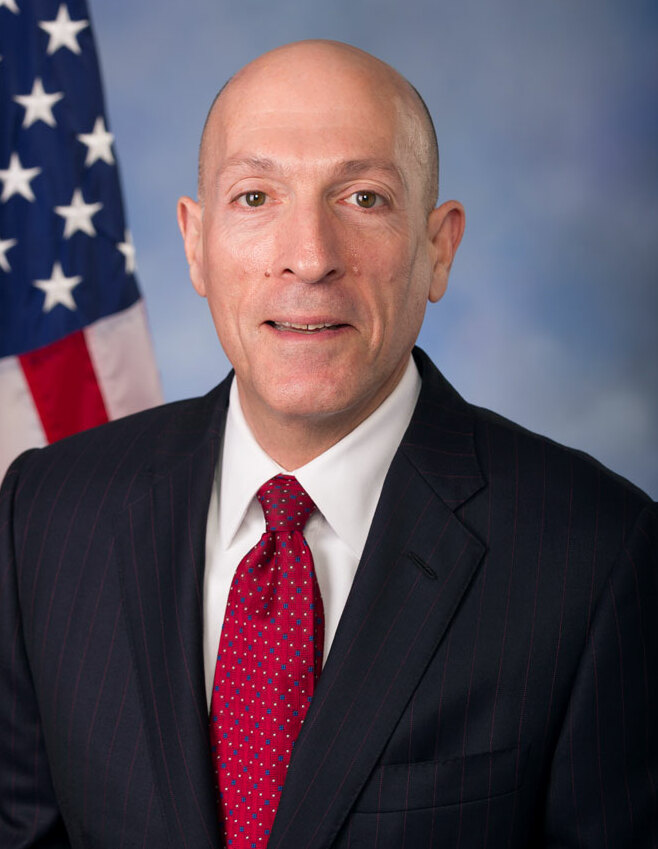
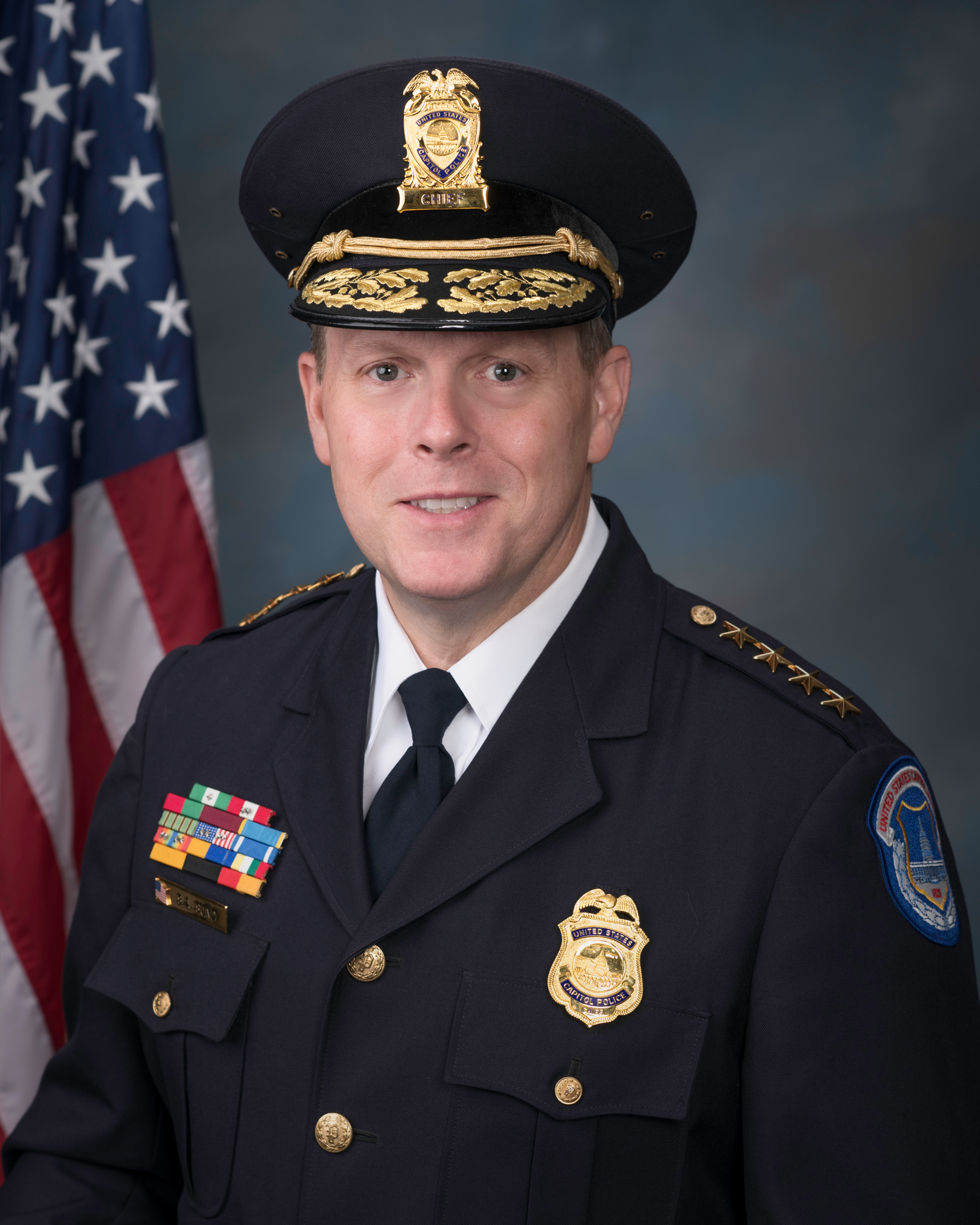
On January 6, the Capitol police were led by Michael C. Stenger (top left) the Sergeant at Arms of the United States Senate, Paul D. Irving (top right) the Sergeant at Arms of the United States House of Representatives, and Steven Sund (bottom), the Chief of the Capitol Police. All three resigned in the wake of January 6.

Capitol Police leadership had not planned for a riot or attack, and on January 6, under "orders from leadership", the force deployed without riot gear, shields, batons, or "less lethal" arms such as sting grenades. Before the riot, they were seen taking selfies with the rioters. Department riot shields had been improperly stored, causing them to shatter upon impact. Hundreds more Capitol Police could have been used, but they were not.

Concerned about the approaching mob, Representative Maxine Waters called Capitol Police Chief Steven Sund, who was not on the Capitol grounds but at the police department's headquarters. When asked what the Capitol Police were doing to stop the rioters, Sund told Waters, "We're doing the best we can" and then hung up on her. It was not until 2:10 p.m. that the Capitol Police board granted Chief Sund permission to formally request deployment of the Guard.

In a February 2021 confidence vote organized by the U.S. Capitol Police Labor Committee, the union representing Capitol Police officers, 92 percent voted that they had no confidence in leadership, writing: "Our leaders did not properly plan for the protest nor prepare officers for what they were about to face. This despite the fact they knew days before that the protest had the potential to turn violent. We still have no answers why leadership failed to inform or equip us for what was coming on January 6th".

=== Department of Defense leadership's refusal to send Guard ===
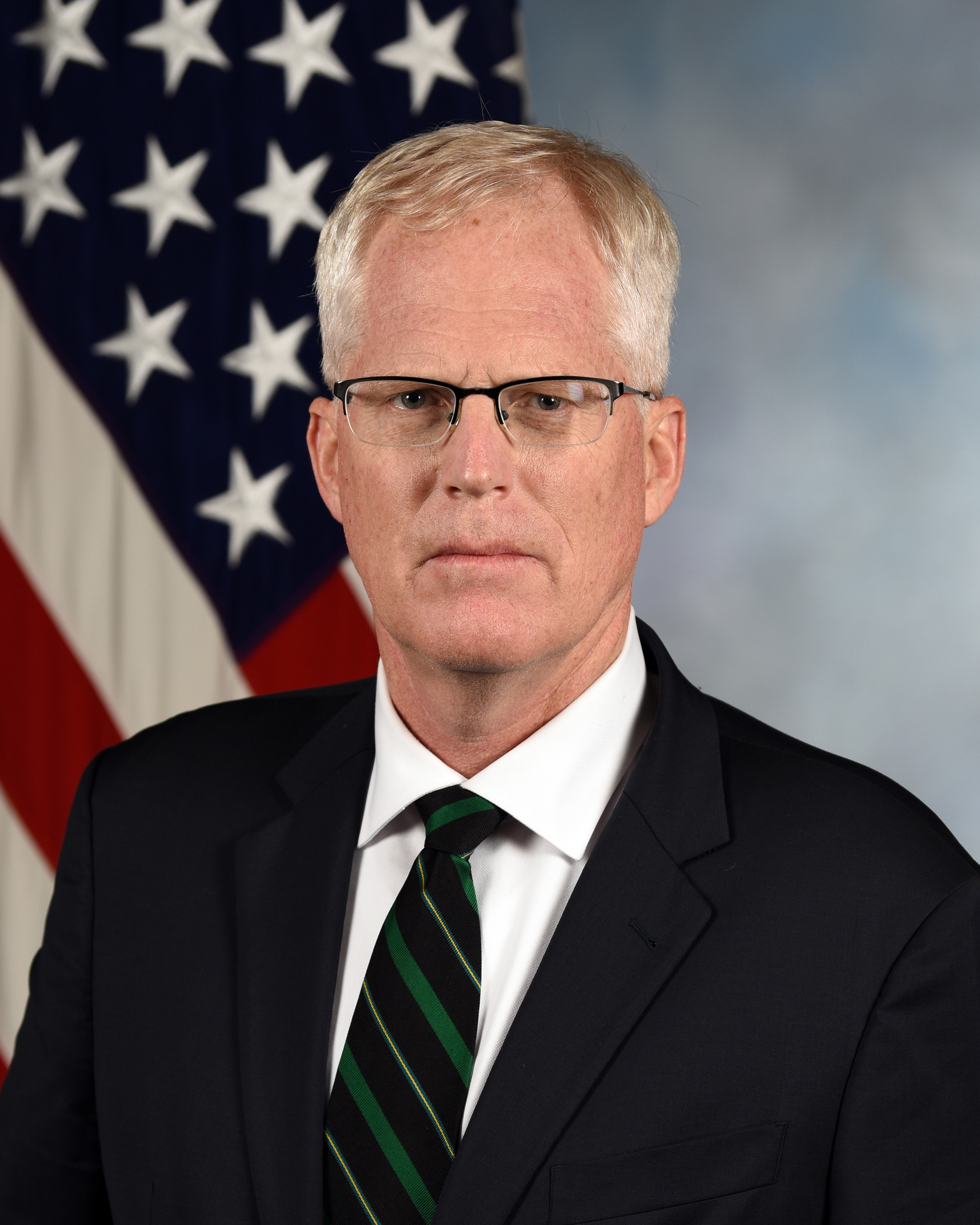
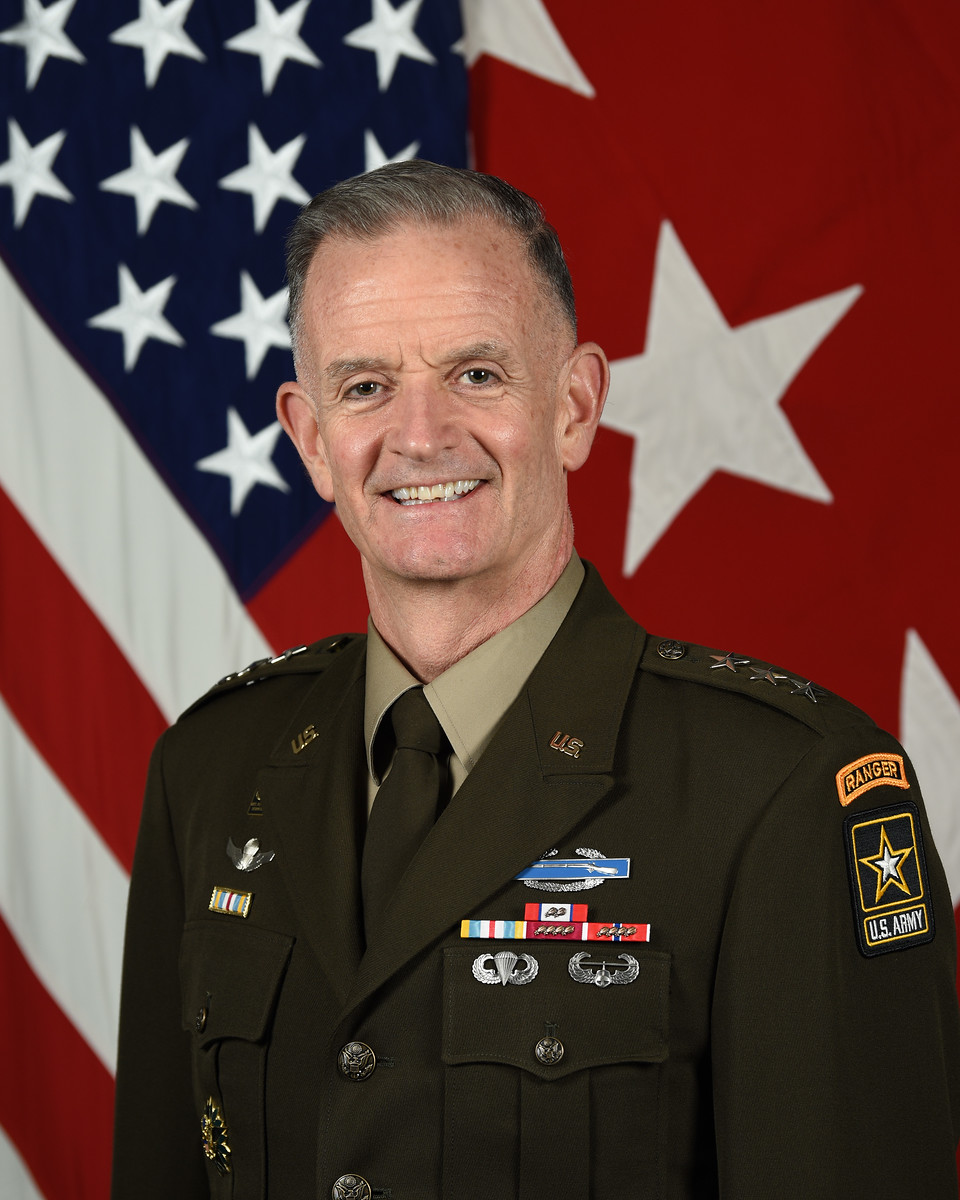
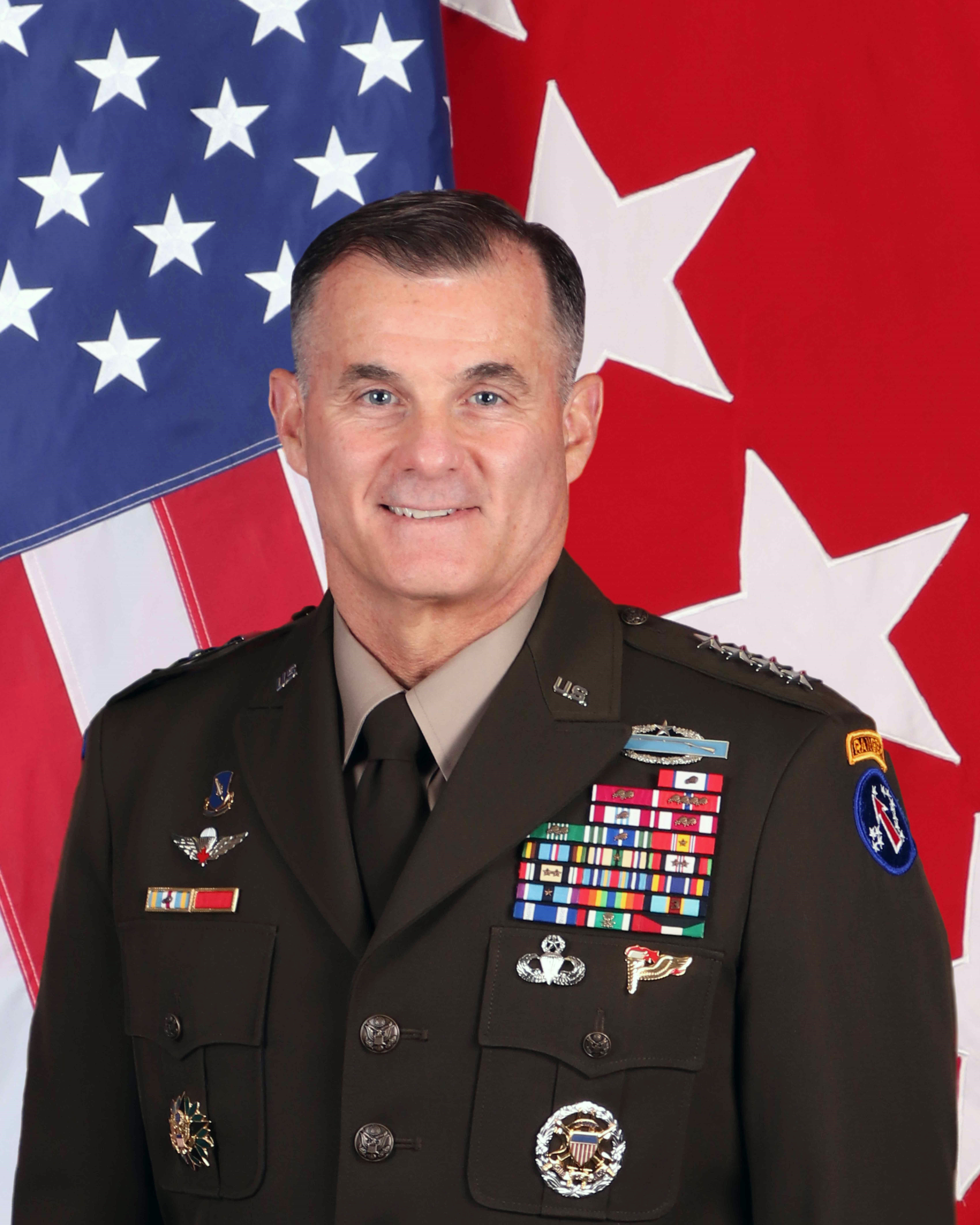
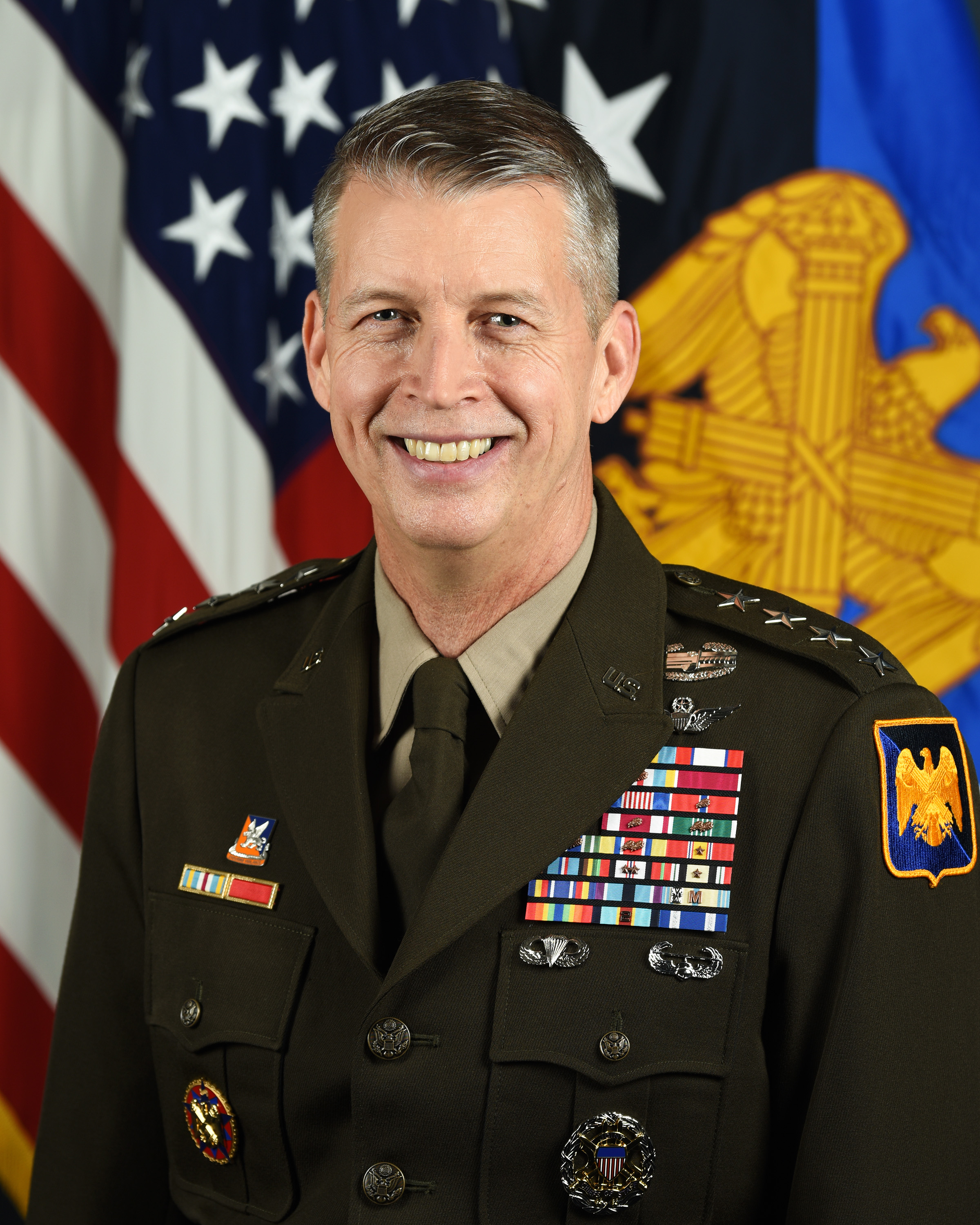
Acting-Secretary Christopher Miller (top left), whose appointment had prompted concerns of a right-wing military coup, failed to authorize the National Guard to deploy until after the Capitol had been secured and Trump had called for supporters to "go home". Walter E. Piatt (top right) and Charles Flynn (bottom left) participated in a 2:26 p.m. call denying deployment of the guard, though the military did not admit Flynn's role for weeks after the attack. Daniel R. Hokanson (bottom right) placed calls to ensure the Virginia and Maryland National Guard would not move until given explicit permission by the Pentagon.

On January 3, acting defense secretary Miller had been ordered by Trump to "do whatever was necessary to protect the demonstrators" on January 6. The following day, Miller issued orders which prohibited deploying D.C. Guard members with weapons, helmets, body armor, or riot control agents without his personal approval. Prior to the attack, Trump had floated the idea with his staff of deploying 10,000 National Guardsmen, though not to protect the Capitol, but rather "to protect him and his supporters from any supposed threats by left-wing counterprotestors".

At 1:34 p.m., D.C. mayor Muriel Bowser had a telephone call with Army Secretary Ryan D. McCarthy in which she requested that they deploy the Guard. At 2:10 p.m., the Capitol Police board permitted Chief Sund to formally request deployment of the Guard.

At 2:26 p.m., D.C.'s homeland security director Chris Rodriguez coordinated a conference call with Bowser, the chiefs of the Capitol Police (Sund) and Metropolitan Police (Contee), and D.C. National Guard (DCNG) commander Walker. As the DCNG does not report to a governor, but to the president, Walker patched in the Office of the Secretary of the Army, noting that he would need Pentagon authorization to deploy. Lt. Gen. Walter E. Piatt, director of the Army Staff, noted that the Pentagon needed Capitol Police authorization to step onto Capitol grounds. Metro Police Chief Robert Contee asked for clarification from Capitol Police Chief Sund: "Steve, are you requesting National Guard assistance at the Capitol?" to which Sund replied, "I am making urgent, urgent, immediate request for National Guard assistance". According to Sund, Piatt stated, "I don't like the visual of the National Guard standing a police line with the Capitol in the background". Sund pleaded with Piatt to send the Guard, but Piatt stated that only Army Secretary McCarthy had the authority to approve such a request, and he could not recommend that Secretary McCarthy approve the request for assistance directly to the Capitol. The D.C. officials were subsequently described as "flabbergasted" at this message. McCarthy would later state that he was not on this conference call because he was already entering a meeting with senior department leadership. General Charles A. Flynn, brother of General Michael Flynn, a Trump and QAnon supporter, participated in the call.

By 3:37 p.m., the Pentagon dispatched its own security forces to guard the homes of senior defense leaders, "even though no rioters or criminal attacks are occurring at those locations". Sund later opined, "This demonstrates to me that the Pentagon fully understands the urgency and danger of the situation even as it does nothing to support us on the Hill".

In response to the reluctance expressed by Department of Defense leaders during the 2:26 conference call, D.C. officials contacted the State of Virginia. Public Safety Secretary of Virginia Brian Moran dispatched the Virginia State Police to the U.S. Capitol, as permitted by a mutual aid agreement with D.C. At 3:46 p.m., after leaders of the Department of Defense learned that the Virginia National Guard may have mobilized, the head of the National Guard Bureau, General Hokanson, called the Virginia commander to verify that the Virginia Guard would not move without prior permission from the Pentagon. At 3:55, Hokanson made a similar call to the commander of the Maryland National Guard.

On January 6, Secretary Miller ultimately withheld permission to deploy the National Guard until 4:32 p.m., after assets from Virginia had already entered the district, FBI tactical teams had arrived at the Capitol, and Trump had instructed rioters to "go home". Miller's permission would not actually be relayed to the commander of the National Guard until 5:08. Sund recalls a comment from the DC National Guard commander General Walker, who said:

Steve, I felt so bad. I wanted to help you immediately, but I couldn't. I could hear the desperation in your voice, but they wouldn't let me come. When we arrived, I saw the New Jersey State Police. Imagine how I felt. New Jersey got here before we did!

The Army falsely denied for two weeks that Lt. Gen. Charles A. Flynn, the Army deputy chief of staff for operations, plans, and training, was on the call requesting the National Guard. Flynn's role drew scrutiny due to his brother Michael's recent calls for martial law and an election do-over overseen by the military. Flynn testified that "he never expressed a concern about the visuals, image, or public perception of" sending the Guard to the Capitol; Col. Earl Matthews, who participated in the call and took contemporaneous notes, called Flynn's denial "outright perjury". Department of Defense leaders claim they called the D.C. National Guard commander at 4:30 to relay permission to deploy—leaders of the Guard deny this call ever took place.

=== Congressional conduct ===
During the attack, Representative Lauren Boebert (R-CO) posted information about the police response and the location of members on Twitter, including the fact that Speaker Pelosi had been taken out of the chamber, for which Boebert has faced calls to resign for endangering members. Boebert responded that she was not sharing private information since Pelosi's removal was also broadcast on TV.

Representative Ayanna Pressley (D-MA) left the congressional safe room for fear of other members there "who incited the mob in the first place".

While sheltering for hours in the "safe room", a cramped, windowless room where people sat within arm's reach of each other, some Republican Congress members refused to wear face masks, even when their Democratic colleagues begged them to do so. During the following week, three Democratic members tested positive for COVID-19 in what an environmental health expert described as a "superspreader" event.

=== Deletion of Secret Service and Homeland Security text messages ===
As part of its investigation into the events of January 6, the Department of Homeland Security Office of Inspector General requested text messages from the Secret Service. In response, the messages were deleted. Text messages from Department of Homeland Security leaders Chad Wolf and Ken Cuccinelli "are missing from a key period leading up to the January 6 attack". Wolf's nomination had been withdrawn by the White House sometime on January 6. A criminal investigation was opened into the deletion.

== Participants, groups, and criminal charges ==
By November 2023, over 1,200 defendants had been charged for their role in the attack. The attackers included some of Trump's longtime and most fervent supporters from across the United States. The mob included Republican Party officials, current and former state legislators and political donors, far-right militants, white supremacists, conservative evangelical Christians, (Note: Before the demonstrators entered the building, activist Jacob Chansley called out for them to pause and join him in prayer.) and participants of the "Save America" Rally. According to the FBI, dozens of people on its terrorist watchlist were in D.C. for pro-Trump events on the 6th, with the majority being "suspected white supremacists". Some came heavily armed and some were convicted criminals, including a man who had been released from a Florida prison after serving a sentence for attempted murder.

Last Sons of Liberty, Rod of Iron Ministries, Groypers, Nationalist Social Club-131 and Super Happy Fun America were allegedly involved in the attack. Multiple factions of the Three Percenters also participated in the attack, including "DC Brigade", "Patriot Boys of North Texas", and "B Squad". The B Squad and DC Brigade conspired with the Proud Boys and Oath Keepers.

=== Proud Boys ===
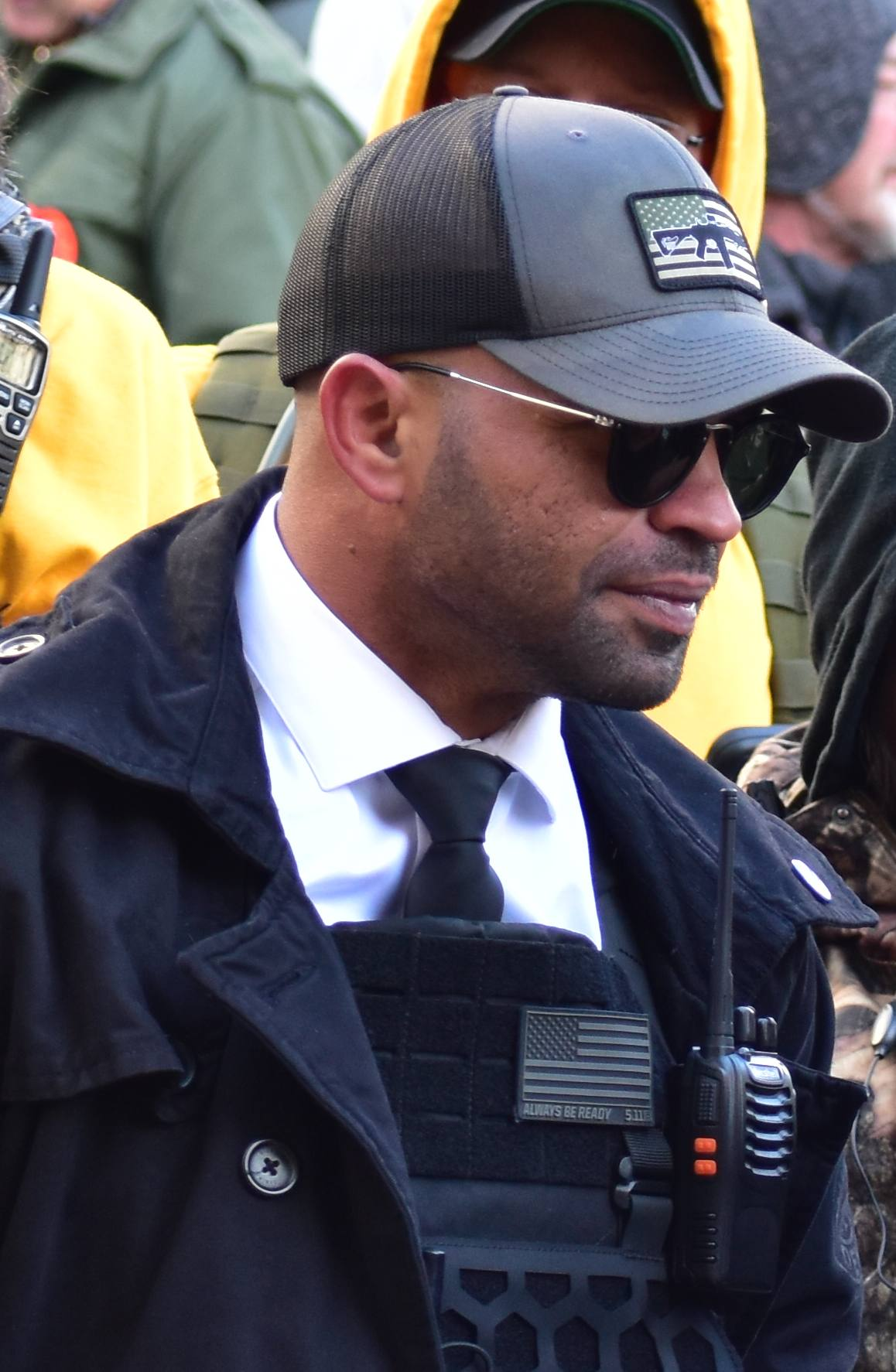
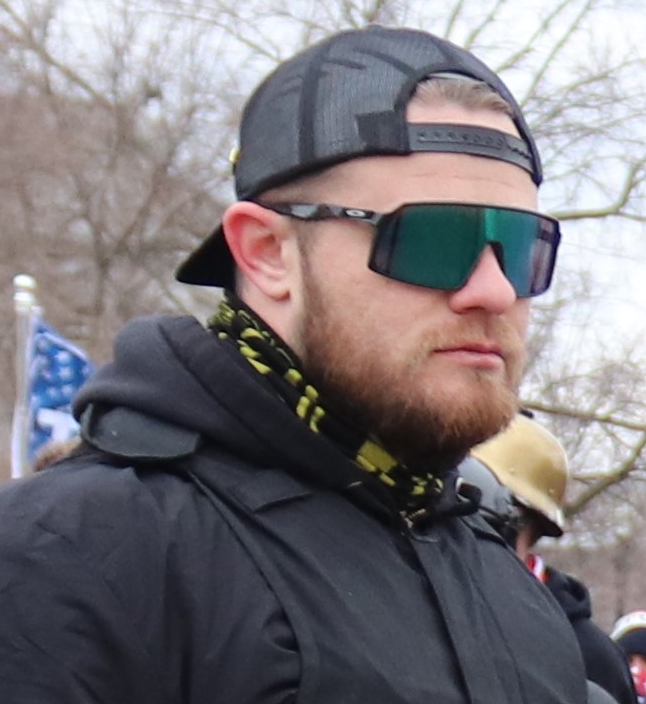
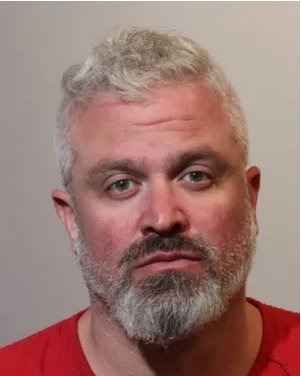
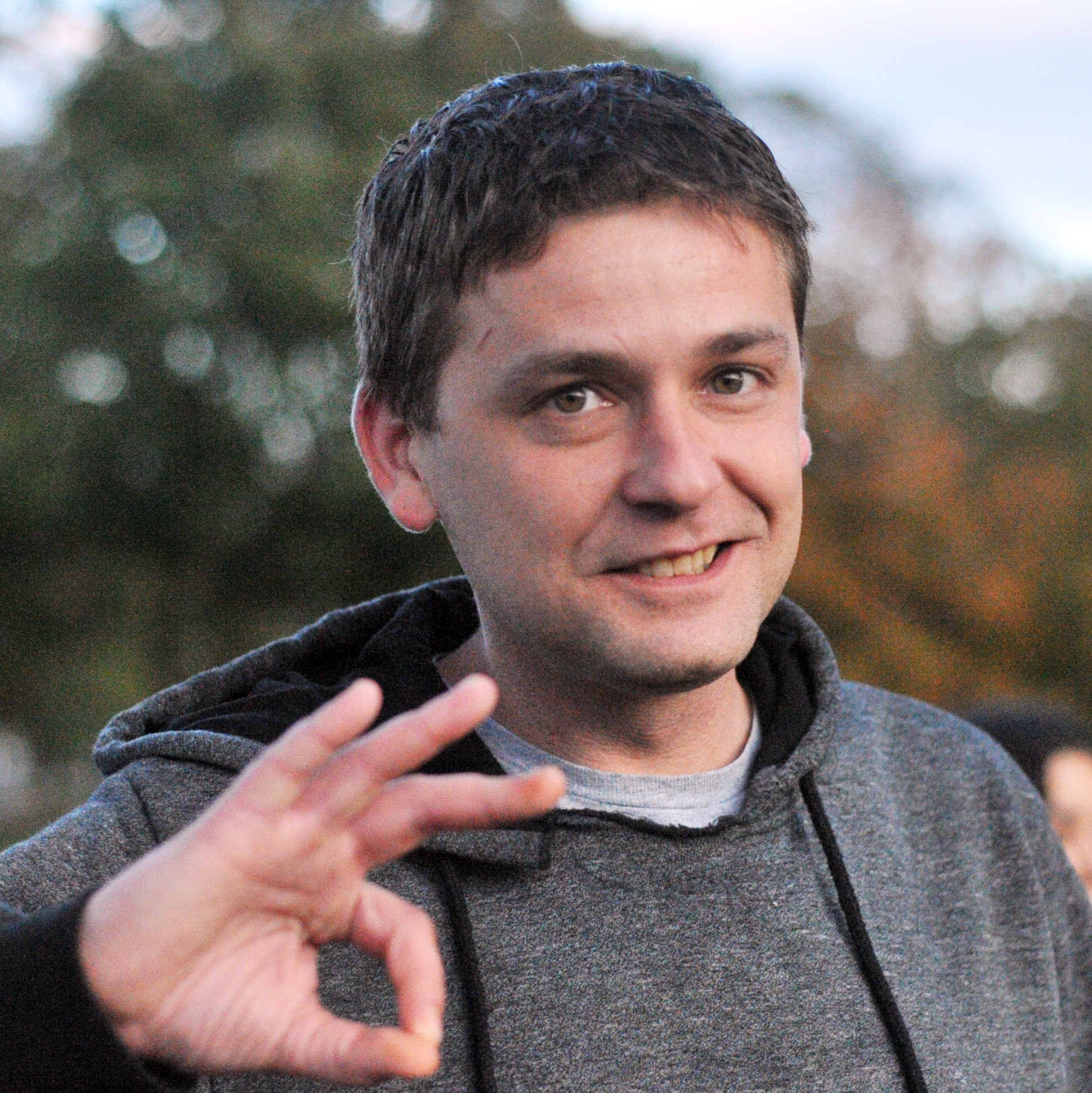
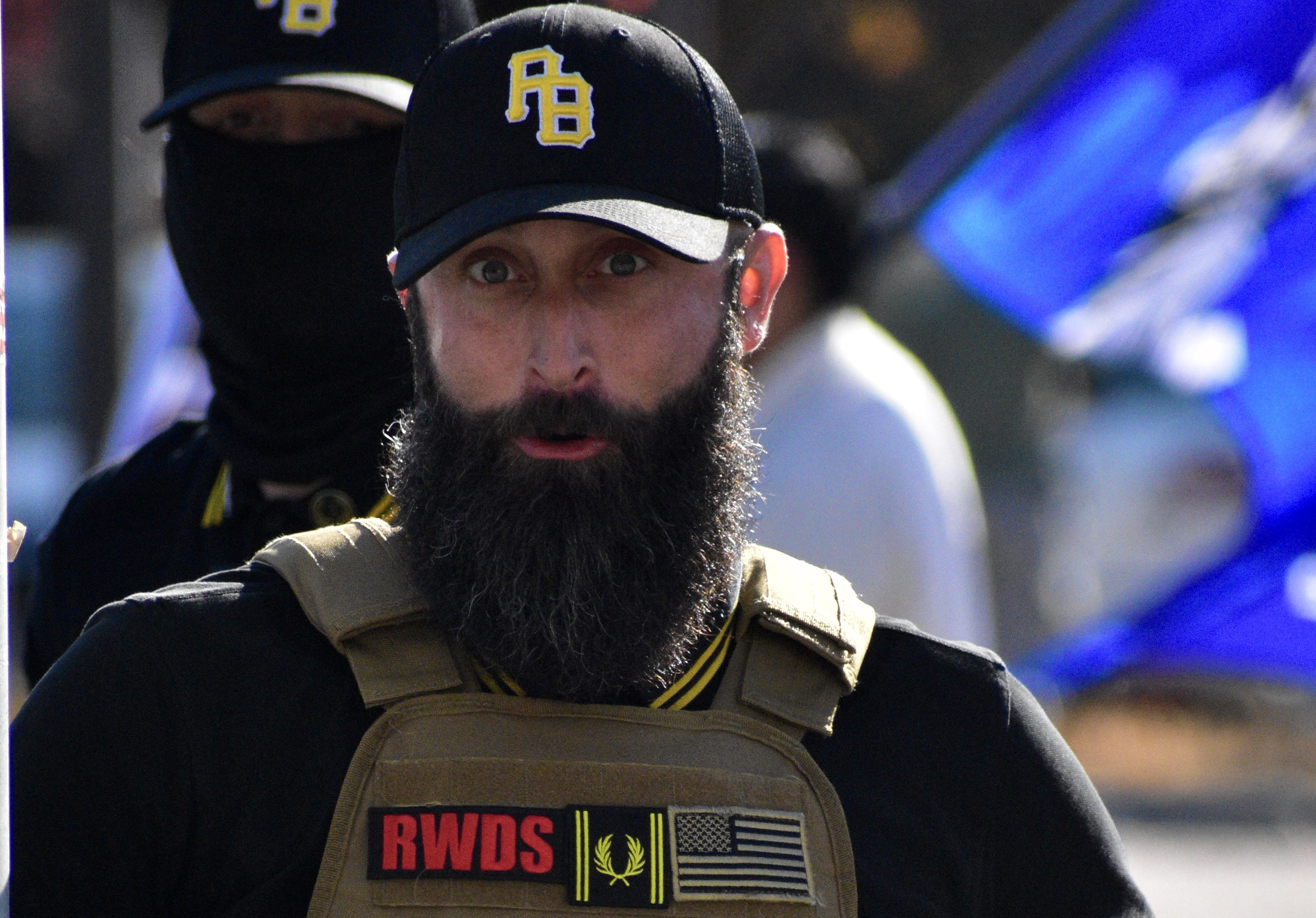
Proud Boys leaders who were guilty of leading a seditious conspiracy to stop the transfer of power: Chairman Enrique Tarrio of Florida (top left), Ethan "Rufio" Nordean of Washington State (top center), Joe Biggs (top right) of Florida, Zachary Rehl of Pennsylvania (bottom left) and Jeremy Bertino of South Carolina (bottom right). Bertino pleaded guilty, while the other four were found guilty at trial.

The Proud Boys played a much greater role in planning and coordinating the attack than was publicly known in 2021. In 2022, new information appeared in testimony to the January 6 Committee and in a New York Times investigative video. Another key revelation about the Proud Boys' plans came from an informant and concerned Mike Pence:

According to an F.B.I. affidavit the panel highlighted ... a government informant said that members of the far-right militant group the Proud Boys told him they would have killed Pence 'if given the chance.' The rioters on January 6th almost had that chance, coming within forty feet of the Vice-President as he fled to safety.

On July 7, 2023, Barry Bennet Ramey was sentenced to 5 years in prison. He was connected to the Proud Boys and pepper-sprayed police in the face. Proud Boys leaders Joseph Biggs and Zachary Rehl were sentenced to 17 and 15 years respectively. Proud Boy Dominic Pezzola, who breached the Capitol with a stolen police riot shield, was sentenced to 10 years. Proud Boys founder Enrique Tarrio, described as the "ultimate leader" of the conspiracy, was sentenced to 22 years in prison.

=== Oath Keepers ===
The Oath Keepers are an American far-right anti-government militia whose leaders have been convicted of violently opposing the government of the United States, including the transfer of presidential power as prescribed by the United States constitution. It was incorporated in 2009 by founder Elmer Stewart Rhodes, a lawyer and former paratrooper.

On January 13, 2022, 10 members of the Oath Keepers, including founder Stewart Rhodes, were arrested and charged with seditious conspiracy. On November 29, a jury convicted Rhodes and Florida chapter Oath Keepers leader Kelly Meggs of seditious conspiracy. Three other members of the Oath Keepers were found not guilty of seditious conspiracy, but were convicted on other, related charges.

On May 23, 2023, Rhodes, age 57, was sentenced to 18 years in prison. The Department of Justice announced plans to appeal to the United States Court of Appeals for the District of Columbia Circuit for longer prison terms for Rhodes and his co-defendants. At sentencing, the court described Rhodes as dangerous, noting "The moment you are released, whenever that may be, you will be ready to take up arms against your government". Eight of Rhodes' militiamen were convicted for seditious conspiracy, among other charges. Meggs was sentenced to 12 years in prison. Jessica Marie Watkins was sentenced to 8 years and six months, and Kenneth Harrelson was sentenced to four years in prison. Both convicts were members of the Oath Keepers, with Watkins' crimes including merging her local Ohio armed group with the Oath Keepers in 2020, and Harrelson's as serving as the right-hand man to Kelly Meggs, leader of the Florida chapter.

=== QAnon ===
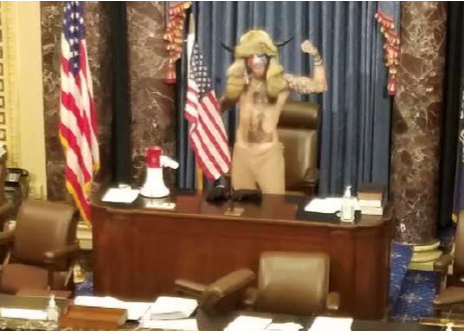
Jacob Chansley, the "QAnon Shaman", in the US Senate during the attack. He was later sentenced to 41 months in prison, being released from halfway house in May 2023.

QAnon is an American political conspiracy theory and political movement that originated in the American far-right political sphere in 2017. QAnon centers on fabricated claims made by an anonymous individual or individuals known as "Q". Those claims have been relayed and developed by online communities and influencers. Their core belief is that a cabal of Satanic, cannibalistic child molesters are operating a global child sex trafficking ring that conspired against Donald Trump. Watchdogs studied QAnon posts and warned of the potential for violence ahead of January 6, 2021. Multiple QAnon-affiliated protesters participated in the attack. One participant, whose attire and behavior attracted worldwide media attention, was Jacob Chansley, a QAnon supporter nicknamed the "QAnon Shaman". Ashli Babbitt, a rioter who was shot dead by police as she was trying to break into the Speaker's Lobby, was a committed follower of QAnon. The day before the attack, she had tweeted: "the storm is here and it is descending upon DC in less than 24 hours".

=== White supremacists, neo-Nazis, and neo-Confederates ===
Far-right emblematic gear was worn by some participants, including neo-Confederate, Holocaust deniers, neo-Nazi and Völkisch-inspired neopagan apparel, as well as a shirt emblazoned with references to the Auschwitz concentration camp and its motto, Arbeit macht frei ("Work sets you free"). (Note: Attributed to multiple sources.)

The anti-Semitic, neo-Nazi group NSC-131 was at the event, although it is unknown to what extent. (Note: The group is more radical than other patriot movement groups who attended the rally. "NSC members consider themselves soldiers fighting a war against a hostile, Jewish-controlled system that is deliberately plotting the extinction of the white race." states the ADL.) Following the event, members of the group detailed their actions and claimed they were the "beginning of the start of White Revolution in the United States". After the attack, two white nationalists known for racist and anti-Semitic rhetoric streamed to their online followers a video posted on social media showing a man harassing an Israeli journalist seeking to conduct a live report outside the building.

A Confederate battle flag was displayed inside the Capitol for the first time in U.S. history. Some of the rioters carried American flags, Confederate battle flags, (Note: Attributed to multiple sources.) or Nazi emblems. A group of Indian American Trump supporters held an Indian flag. Varun Gandhi, a senior parliamentarian from India's ruling BJP, expressed surprise and disapproval of the prominent display of the Indian flag by some of the protestors in one of his tweets; opposition Indian National Congress leader Shashi Tharoor equated the mentality of some Indians with that of Trump supporters.

The laptop computer taken from Pelosi's office was taken by 22-year-old Capitol rioter Riley Williams, a member of the Atomwaffen Division and the Order of Nine Angles. (Note: Attributed to multiple sources.) Williams' boyfriend, who tipped off police, said that she had intended to send the stolen laptop to a friend in Russia for sale to Russian intelligence. Williams was sentenced to three years in prison.

The National Capital Region Threat Intelligence Consortium, a fusion center that aids the DHS and other federal national security and law enforcement groups, wrote that potentially violent individuals were joining the protest from the neo-Nazi group Atomwaffen Division and Stormfront. Despite this information, the Secret Service released an internal memo that stated there was no concern.

=== Others ===
Although the anti-government Boogaloo movement mostly were opposed to Trump, a Boogaloo follower said groups under his command helped attack the Capitol, taking the opportunity to strike against the federal government. Also present during the attack were parts of the National Anarchist Movement and the Blue Lives Matter movement, supporters of the America First Movement, the Stop the Steal movement and the Patriot Movement, remnants of the Tea Party movement, the Three Percenters, the Groypers, Christian nationalists, and other far-right organizations and groups. Shirts with references to the internet meme Pepe the Frog were also seen, alongside "1776" and "MAGA civil war 2021" shirts, NSC-131 stickers, and the valknut symbol. Rioters were seen using the OK gesture, a gesture that had been famously co-opted as an alt-right symbol. Christian imagery, including a large "Jesus saves" banner, was seen in the crowd of demonstrators. Various other iconography was also on display, such as flags of other countries. (Note: Witnesses reported seeing the national flags of Cuba, Romania, India, Israel, South Vietnam, Australia, Japan, Iran, Georgia, South Korea, Tonga, Mexico, Canada, and the United States (including an upside-down version); a U.S. Marines flag; the flag of the fictional country of "Kekistan"; Trump campaign flags such as "Release the Kraken", Second Amendment and America First flags; Pine tree, III Percenters and VDARE flags; altered versions of confederate, Gadsden, state, national and Gay Pride flags; as well as old American and Army flags such as the Betsy Ross flag, Irish Brigade flags, and others.)

Anti-vaccine activists and conspiracy theorists were also present at the rally. Members of the right-wing Tea Party Patriots–backed group America's Frontline Doctors, including founder Simone Gold and its communications director, were arrested. She was later sentenced to 60 days in prison by a US federal court in Washington, D.C., for illegally entering the Capitol building. West Virginia delegate Derrick Evans, a state lawmaker, filmed himself entering the Capitol alongside rioters. On January 8, he was charged by federal authorities with entering a restricted area; he resigned from the House of Delegates the next day and was ultimately sentenced to 90 days in jail. Amanda Chase was censured by the Virginia State Senate for her actions surrounding the event.

=== Police and military connections ===
Politico reported that some rioters briefly showed their police badges or military identification to law enforcement as they approached the Capitol, expecting to be let inside; a Capitol Police officer told BuzzFeed News that one rioter had told him "[w]e're doing this for you" as he flashed a badge. One former police officer, Laura Steele, was convicted for breaching the Capitol with fellow Oath Keepers.

A number of U.S. military personnel participated in the attack; the Department of Defense is investigating members on active and reserve duty who may have been involved. Nearly 20% of defendants charged in relation to the attack, and about 12% of the participants in general, were current or former members of the U.S. military. A report from George Washington University and the Combating Terrorism Center said that "if anything ... there actually is a very slight underrepresentation of veterans among the January 6 attackers". Police officers and a police chief from departments in multiple states are under investigation for their alleged involvement in the attack. Two Capitol Police officers were suspended, one for directing rioters inside the building while wearing a Make America Great Again hat, and the other for taking a selfie with a rioter.

=== Analysis ===
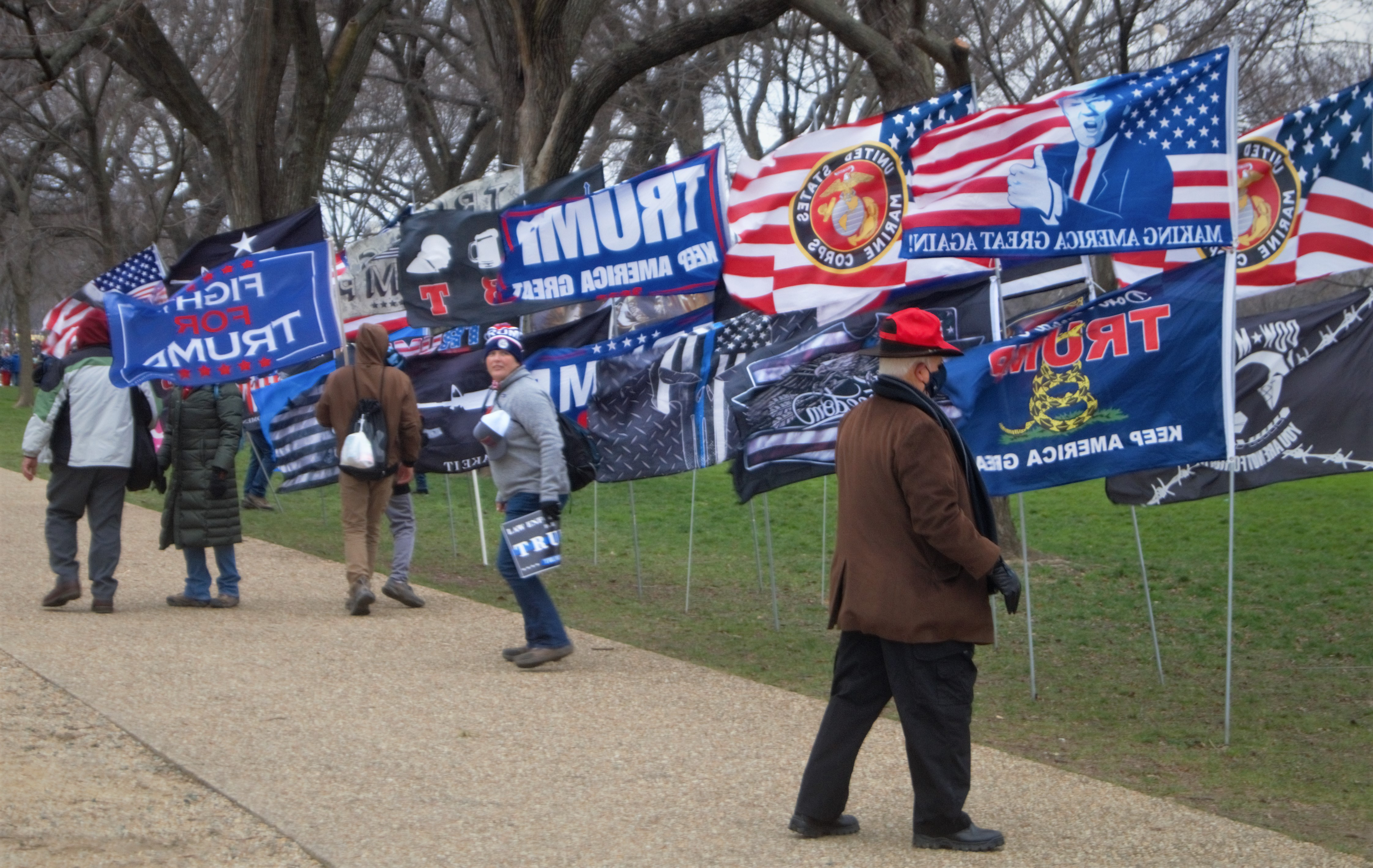
A row of flags lining the Capitol grounds

In February 2021, an academic analysis in The Atlantic found that of the 193 persons so far arrested for invading the Capitol, 89 percent had no clear public connection to established far-right militias, known white-nationalist gangs, or any other known militant organizations. "The overwhelming reason for action, cited again and again in court documents, was that arrestees were following Trump's orders to keep Congress from certifying Joe Biden as the presidential-election winner". They were older than participants in previous far-right violent demonstrations and more likely to be employed, with 40% being business owners. The researchers concluded that these "middle-aged, middle-class insurrectionists" represented "a new force in American politics – not merely a mix of right-wing organizations, but a broader mass political movement that has violence at its core and draws strength even from places where Trump supporters are in the minority".

The Associated Press reviewed public and online records of more than 120 participants after the attack and found that many of them shared conspiracy theories about the election on social media and had believed other QAnon and "deep state" conspiracy theories. Several had threatened Democratic and Republican politicians before the attack. The event was described as "extremely online", with "pro-Trump internet personalities" and fans streaming live footage while taking selfies.

According to the University of Maryland's National Consortium for the Study of Terrorism and Responses to Terrorism:

The "ordinary people" argument misses, or at least obscures, the extent to which the Capitol rioters were linked to dangerous groups and ideas.... at least 280 of the individuals charged with committing crimes on Jan. 6 were associated with extremist groups or conspiratorial movements. This includes 78 defendants who had links to the Proud Boys, a group with a history of violence; 37 members of the anti-government Oath Keepers militia; 31 individuals who embraced the similarly anti-government and militant views of the Three Percenters movement; and 92 defendants who promoted aspects of QAnon.... These 280 individuals make up approximately 35 percent of the Capitol defendants. While it is true that they do not represent a majority of the more than 800 people who have been charged in connection with the riot, ... A 35 percent rate of participation in extremism among a collective of apparently "ordinary" individuals is an astounding number – one that should shake us to our core.

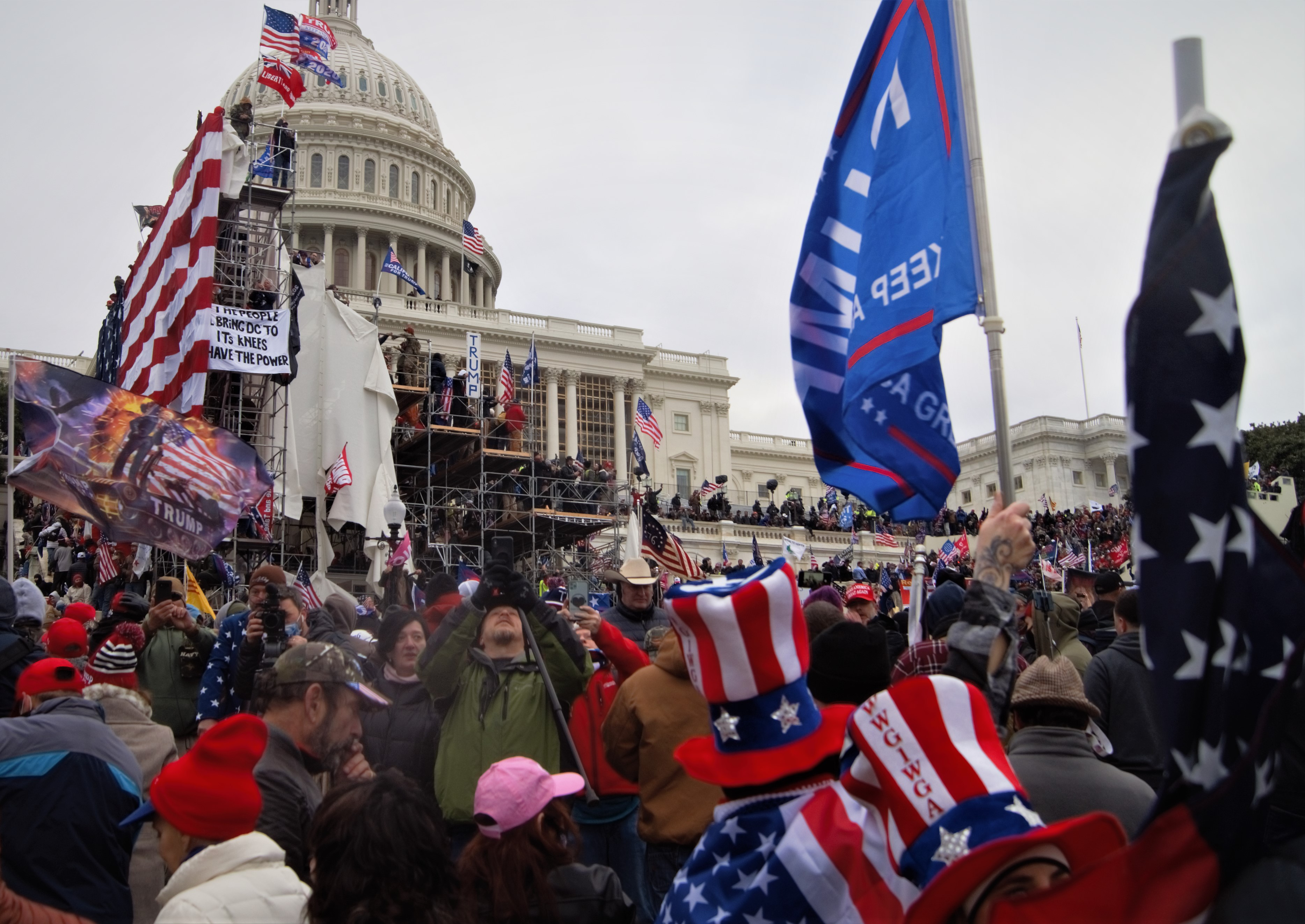
Rioters outside the Capitol shortly after Congress was evacuated

Federal officials estimate that about ten thousand rioters entered the Capitol grounds, and the Secret Service and FBI have estimated that from 2,000 to 2,500 ultimately entered the building. As of May 2024, about 1,400 people had been charged with federal crimes relating to the event, and 884 of those defendants had been sentenced, in many cases for nonviolent offenses. Those who went inside the Capitol but were peaceful have been called "MAGA tourists".

More than 800 video and audio files—including D.C. Metropolitan Police radio transmissions, Capitol Police body-worn camera footage, and Capitol surveillance camera footage—were later obtained as evidence in Trump's impeachment trial. The evidence showed that the assailants launched a large and coordinated attack. For example, "Security camera footage near the House chamber shows the rioters waving in reinforcements to come around the corner. Another video shows more than 150 rioters charging through a breached entrance in just a minute-and-a-half". While assaulting the Capitol, the crowd chanted "Fight, Fight"; "Stop the steal"; and "Fight for Trump". As they were overrun by a violent mob, the police acted with restraint and pleaded for backup. Many of the attackers employed tactics, body armor, and technology (such as two-way radio headsets) similar to those of the very police they were confronting. Some rioters wore riot gear, including helmets and military-style vests. A pair of rioters carried plastic handcuffs, which they found on a table inside the Capitol. In an analysis of later court documents, it was reported that at least 85 participants in the riot were charged with carrying or using a weapon—such as guns, knives, axes, chemical sprays, police gear, and stun guns—in the riots to assault others or break objects. It is illegal to possess weapons at the Capitol.

== Results ==
=== Casualties and suicides ===
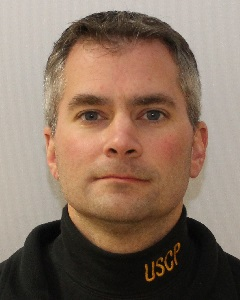
Capitol Police officer Brian Sicknick died the day after the attack.

Ashli Babbitt, a 35-year-old Air Force veteran, was fatally shot in the upper chest by Lt. Michael Leroy Byrd while attempting to climb through the shattered window of a barricaded door. (Note: Some media reports have described Babbitt as "unarmed" at the time of the shooting; however, according to a January 11, 2021, crime scene examination report by the D.C. Department of Forensic Sciences, the police "recovered a 'Para Force' folding knife in Ms. Babbitt's pants pocket" after she was shot.)

Brian Sicknick, a 42-year-old responding Capitol Police officer, was pepper-sprayed during the attack and had two thromboembolic strokes the next day, after which he was placed on life support and soon died. The D.C. chief medical examiner found he died from a stroke, classifying his death as natural, and said that the designation of natural causes is "used when a disease alone causes death. If death is hastened by an injury, the manner of death is not considered natural". The coroner commented that "all that transpired played a role in his condition". While some accounts maintain he was struck in the head during the riots, he was not found to have died from blunt-force trauma. No signs of any injuries were found during medical examination.

Rosanne Boyland, 34, died of an amphetamine overdose during the attack, rather than, as was initially reported, from injuries sustained from being crushed beneath other rioters. When the crowd of rioters moved from on top of her, she was found dead. Her death was ruled as accidental by the D.C. medical examiner's office. Her mother, Cheryl Boyland, told NBC News: "She was not doing drugs. The only thing they found was her own prescription medicine".

Kevin Greeson, 55; and Benjamin Philips, 50, died naturally from coronary heart disease and hypertensive heart disease, respectively. There was no indication that they participated in the riot.

Four officers, from various police departments, who responded to the attack committed suicide in the days and months that followed. Capitol Police officer Howard Charles Liebengood died by suicide three days after the attack. D.C. Metropolitan Police officer Jeffrey Smith, who was injured in the attack, died by suicide from a gunshot wound to the head at George Washington Memorial Parkway on January 15, after a misdiagnosed concussion; his death was found to be in line of duty. In July, two more officers who responded to the attack died by suicide: Metropolitan Police officer Kyle Hendrik DeFreytag was found on July 10, and Metropolitan Police officer Gunther Paul Hashida was found on July 29.

Some rioters (Note: Only sporadic instances of injured rioters have been publicly recorded; injuries in general (such as a total number) among this group have not.) and 174 police officers were injured, of whom 15 were hospitalized, some with severe injuries. All had been released from the hospital by January 11.

=== Damage ===
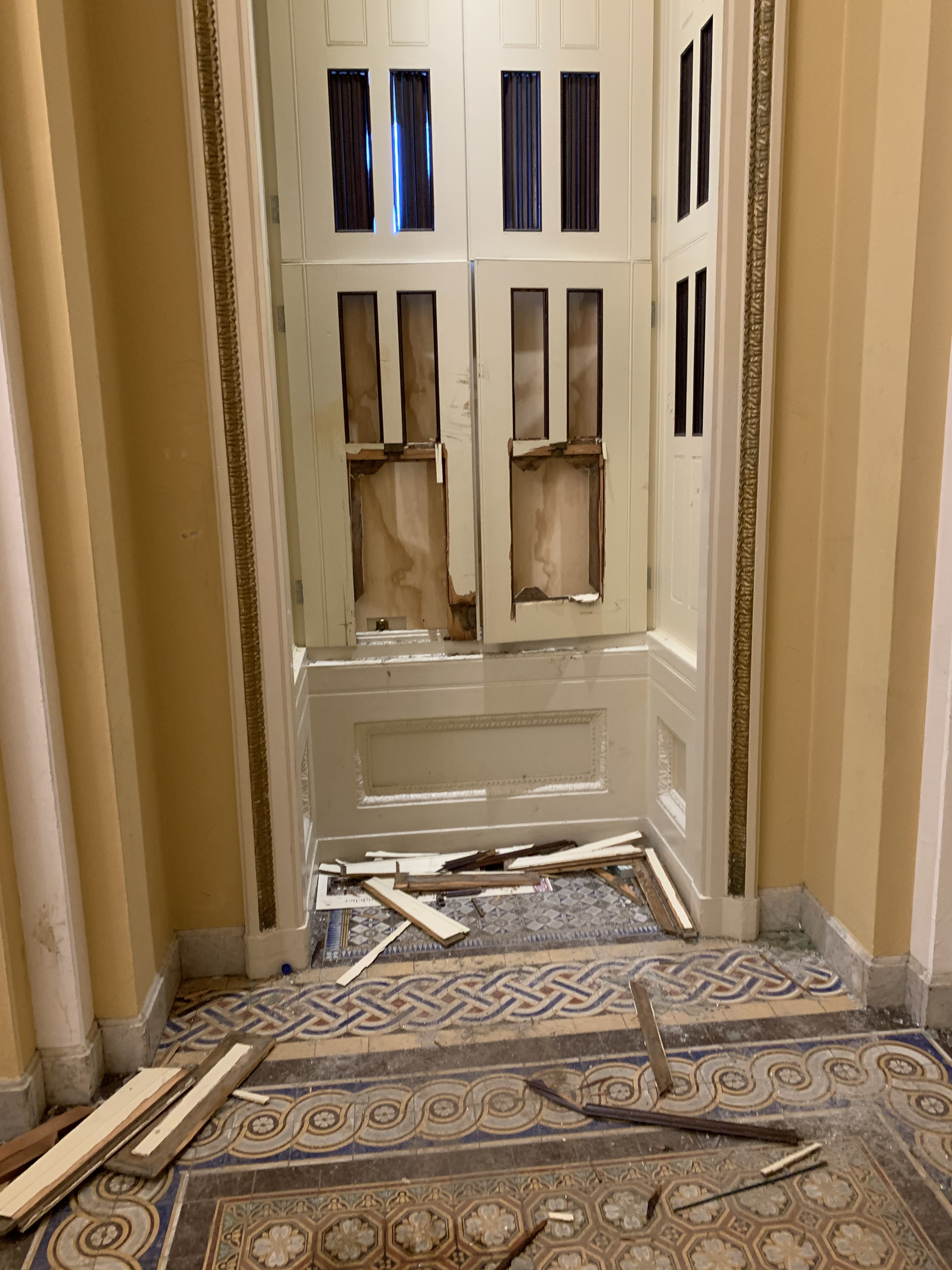
A damaged window in the Capitol

Rioters stormed the offices of Pelosi, flipping tables and ripping photos from walls; the office of the Senate Parliamentarian was ransacked; art was looted; and feces were tracked into hallways. Windows were smashed throughout the building, leaving the floor littered with glass and debris. Rioters damaged, turned over, or stole furniture. One door had "Murder the Media" scribbled onto it in all-caps. Rioters damaged Associated Press recording and broadcasting equipment outside the Capitol after chasing away reporters. Rioters also destroyed a display honoring the life of congressman and civil rights leader John Lewis. A photo of Representative Andy Kim cleaning up the litter in the rotunda after midnight went viral.

The rioters caused extensive physical damage. Architect of the Capitol J. Brett Blanton, who then led the office charged with maintaining the Capitol and preserving its art and architecture, reported in congressional testimony from late February 2021 that the combined costs of repairing the damage and post-attack security measures (such as erecting temporary perimeter fencing) already exceeded $30 million and would continue to increase. In May 2021, U.S. prosecutors estimated that the damage would cost almost $1.5 million. Interior damage from the attack included broken glass, broken doors, and graffiti; some statues, paintings, and furniture were damaged by pepper spray, tear gas, and fire extinguishing agents deployed by rioters and police.

The historic bronze Columbus Doors were damaged. Items, including portraits of John Quincy Adams and James Madison, as well as a marble statue of Thomas Jefferson, were covered in "corrosive gas agent residue"; these were sent to the Smithsonian for assessment and restoration. A 19th-century marble bust of President Zachary Taylor was defaced with what seemed to be blood, but the most important works in the Capitol collection, such as the John Trumbull paintings, were unharmed. On the Capitol's exterior, two 19th-century bronze light fixtures designed by Frederick Law Olmsted were damaged. Because the Capitol has no insurance against loss, taxpayers will pay for damage suffered during the siege. Rare old-growth mahogany wood, stored in Wisconsin for more than one hundred years by the Forest Products Laboratory, was used to replace damaged wooden fixtures and doors at the Capitol.

=== Laptop theft and cybersecurity concerns ===
A laptop owned by Senator Jeff Merkley was stolen. A laptop taken from Pelosi's office was a "laptop from a conference room ... that was only used for presentations", according to Pelosi's deputy chief of staff. After the thief, Riley Williams, was arrested, her house and car were searched by police but they were unable to recover the laptop. The device has not been found to this day. Representative Ruben Gallego said, "we have to do a full review of what was taken, or copied, or even left behind in terms of bugs and listening devices". Military news website SOFREP reported that "several" secret‑level laptops were stolen, some of which had been abandoned while still logged in to SIPRNet, causing authorities to temporarily shut down SIPRNet for a security update on January 7 and leading the United States Army Special Operations Command to re-authorize all SIPRNet-connected computers on January 8.

Representative Anna Eshoo said in a statement that "[i]mages on social media and in the press of vigilantes accessing congressional computers are worrying" and she had asked the Chief Administrative Officer of the House (CAO) "to conduct a full assessment of threats based on what transpired". The CAO said it was "providing support and guidance to House offices as needed".

== Aftermath ==
=== Political, legal, and social repercussions ===
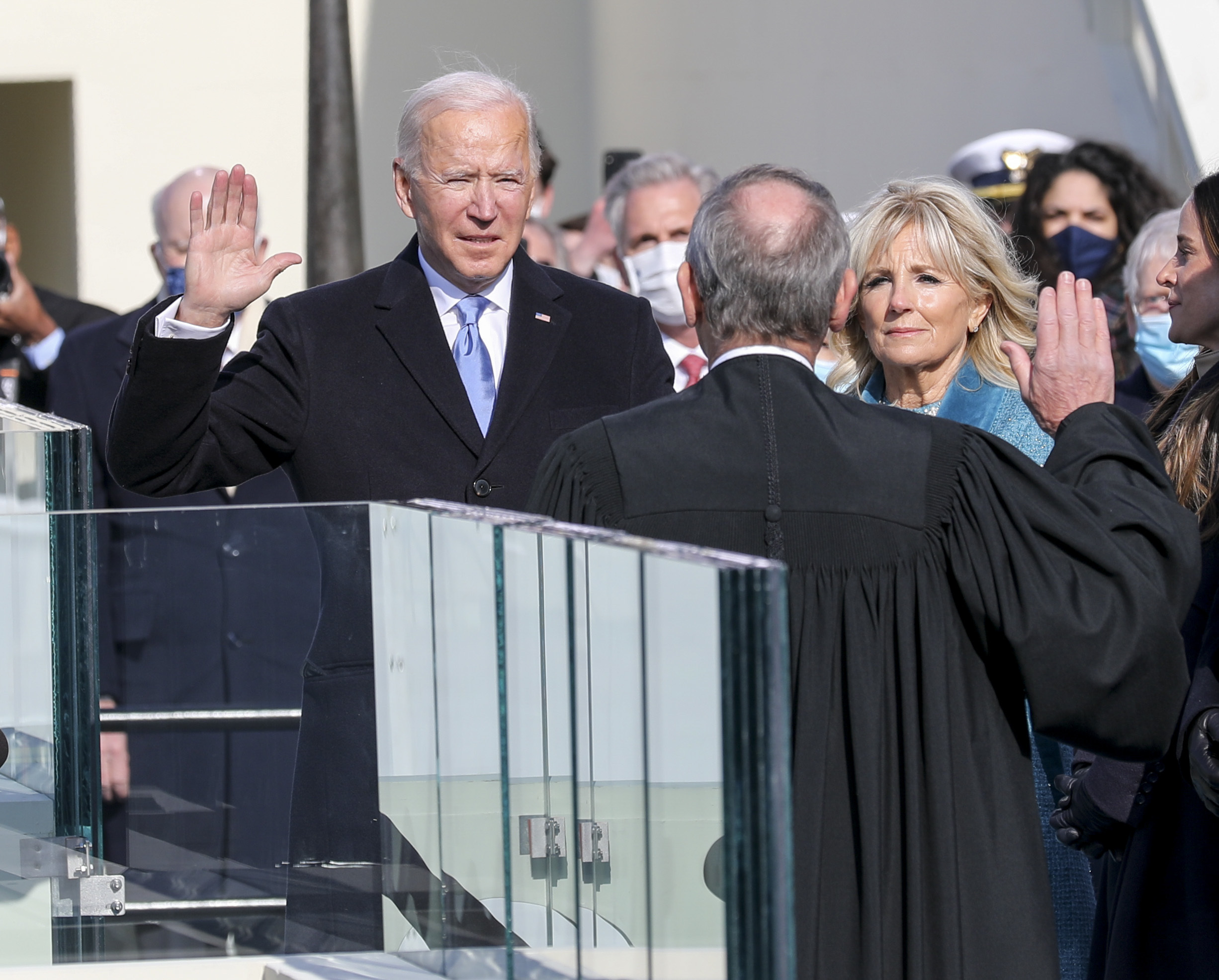
Biden being inaugurated president on January 20, 2021, despite the attack

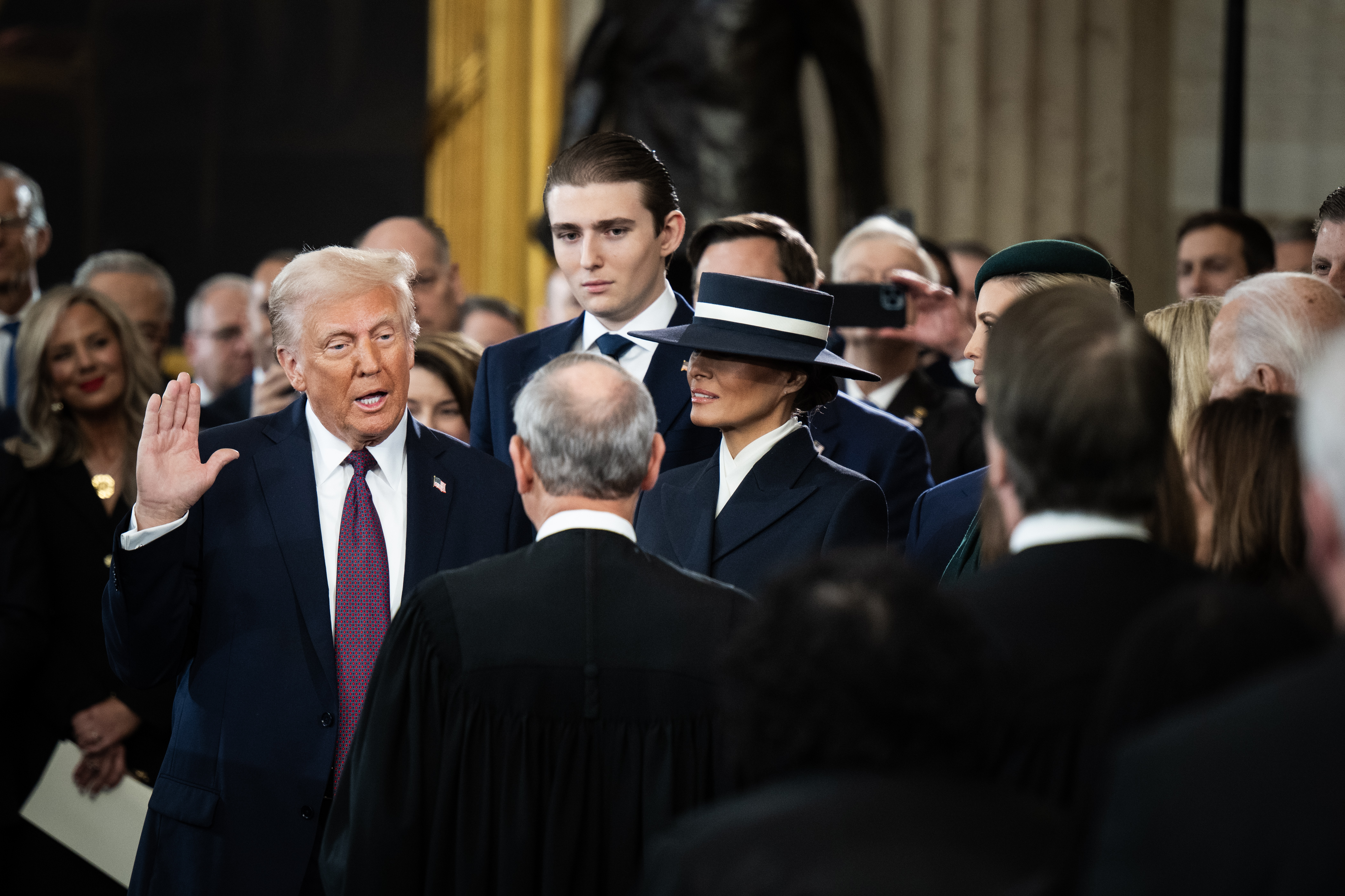
Trump returns to power on January 20, 2025. Hours later, he granted clemency to all rioters.

The attack had political, legal, and social repercussions. The second impeachment of Donald Trump, who was charged for incitement of insurrection for his conduct, occurred on January 13. At the same time, Cabinet officials were pressured to invoke the 25th Amendment for removing Trump from office. Trump was subsequently acquitted in the Senate trial, which was held in February after Trump had already left office. The result was a 57–43 vote in favor of conviction, with every Democrat and seven Republicans voting to convict, but two-thirds of the Senate (67 votes) are required to convict. Many in the Trump administration resigned. Several large companies announced they were halting all political donations, and others have suspended funding the lawmakers who had objected to certifying Electoral College results. A bill was introduced to form an independent commission, similar to the 9/11 Commission, to investigate the events surrounding the attack; it passed the House but was blocked by Republicans in the Senate. The House then approved a House "select committee" to investigate the attack. In June, the Senate released the results of its own investigation of the attack. The event led to strong criticism of law enforcement agencies. Leading figures within the United States Capitol Police resigned. A large-scale criminal investigation was undertaken, with the FBI opening more than 1,200 case files. Federal law enforcement undertook a nationwide manhunt for the perpetrators, with arrests and indictments following within days. Over 890 people had been found guilty of federal crimes.

Trump was suspended from various social media sites for his involvement in inciting the attack, at first temporarily and then indefinitely. In response to posts by Trump supporters in favour of the attempts to overturn the election, the social networking site Parler was shut down by its service providers. Corporate suspensions of other accounts and programs associated with participating groups also took place.

The inauguration week was marked by nationwide security concerns. Unprecedented security preparations for the inauguration of Joe Biden were undertaken, including the deployment of 25,000 National Guard members. In May, the House passed a $1.9 billion Capitol security bill in response to the attack.

In the days following the attack on the Capitol, Republican politicians in at least three states introduced legislation creating new prohibitions on protest activity.

Trump has publicly embraced and celebrated the January 6 Capitol attack. Trump and elected officials within the Republican Party have since promoted a revisionist history of the event by downplaying the severity of the violence, spread conspiracy theories about the attack, called those charged "hostages" and portrayed them as martyrs. (Note: Attributed to multiple sources.)

After his re-election in the 2024 United States presidential election, Trump pardoned about 1,500 people convicted of offenses related to the attack on January 20, 2025.

Within days of the attack on the Capitol, a significant number of corporations and political donors financially distanced themselves from The Trump Organization. The Professional Golf Association was one of the first major organizations to do so, announcing on January 11, 2021, that they would move their 2022 PGA Championship from Trump's club to New Jersey. Deutsche Bank and Signature Bank both announced that week that they would be cutting ties with Trump, with the latter closing two of Trump's personal bank accounts collectively worth $5.3 million USD. New York City previously had contracts with the organization to run several properties but terminated them, a decision that Eric Trump claimed was not within their right to do.

Cushman & Wakefield, one of the United States' largest real estate companies, cut ties with The Trump Organization in the week following the attack. The firm had previously worked with the organization on Trump Tower and the Trump Building, two of the organization's most profitable assets. It had also managed leasing for several of the organization's properties, including Trump Tower. Trump's nephew, Fred Trump III, was asked to leave Cushman & Wakefield due to his familial ties with Trump. Fred Trump III, while he had sued Trump along with his sister Mary L. Trump between 1999 and 2001 over the estate of Fred Trump, had not yet released his 2024 allegations against Trump and was not yet a vocal critic of him. At the time of being asked to leave, he was an executive director for the firm and had been working for there for nearly four years.

A joint federal investigation known as the Arctic Frost investigation was opened in April 2022 involving the FBI, DOJ Office of Inspector General, U.S. Postal Inspection Service, National Archives and Office of Inspector General into efforts to overturn the 2020 presidential election results.

The 117th Congress passed and President Joe Biden signed legislation related to the Capitol attack, including the Capitol Police Emergency Assistance Act of 2021, the Electoral Reform Act, and a bill granting awards to Capitol Police officers for their bravery during the insurrection.

On August 1, 2023, Fitch Ratings downgraded the U.S. credit rating from AAA to AA+, making it the second time in U.S. history the government's credit rating was downgraded since Standard & Poor's downgrade in 2011. Fitch Ratings directly cited the attack as a factor in its decision to downgrade, privately telling Biden officials that the event "indicated an unstable government". It also cited rising debt at the federal, state, and local levels, a "steady deterioration in standards of governance" over the last two decades, worsening political divisions around spending and tax policy, and "repeated debt limit standoffs and last-minute resolutions". Fitch Ratings did note in a previous report that while government stability declined from 2018 to 2021, it had increased since Biden assumed the presidency.

On July 16, 2023, Trump was notified that he was officially a target in the Smith special counsel investigation. On August 1, 2023, Trump was indicted on four charges. These were conspiracy to defraud the United States under Title 18 of the United States Code, obstructing an official proceeding and conspiracy to obstruct an official proceeding under the Sarbanes–Oxley Act of 2002, and conspiracy against rights under the Enforcement Act of 1870. Trump pleaded not guilty, while his attorney Sidney Powell later pleaded guilty to conspiring to interfere with the election. Following Trump's reelection to the presidency in November 2024, Smith filed a motion to dismiss the case without prejudice, citing the DOJ's policy of not prosecuting sitting presidents. Judge Chutkan approved the request and dismissed all charges. Smith submitted his final 137-page report to the Justice Department on January 7, 2025, and resigned three days later. The part of the report about election obstruction was made public on January 14. The part about the mishandling of government records was not released at the same time because it was related to an ongoing criminal case.

Although a few evangelical leaders supported the attack, most condemned the violence and criticized Trump for inciting the crowd. This criticism came from liberal Christian groups such as the Red-Letter Christians, as well as evangelical groups who were generally supportive of Trump. This criticism did not noticeably affect evangelical support for Trump; investigative journalist Sarah Posner, author of Unholy: Why White Evangelicals Worship at the Altar of Donald Trump, argued that many white evangelical Christians in the U.S. create an echo chamber whereby Trump's missteps are blamed on the Democratic Party, leftists, or the mainstream media, the last of which is viewed as especially untrustworthy.

In February 2025, during Donald Trump's second presidential term, The Washington Post reported that candidates for top intelligence and law enforcement positions were being screened with yes-or-no questions about whether January 6 was "an inside job" and whether the 2020 presidential election was "stolen".

State-level legislation has been introduced in New York and passed in Maine and Nevada to preserve the history of the U.S. Capitol riot and counter what Nevada State Assembly member Steve Yeager describes as "misinformation about Jan. 6".

On December 4, 2025, Brian Cole, who was suspected of placing pipe bombs at both the Democratic National Committee and Republican National Committee headquarters in Washington, D.C., on the eve of the January 6, 2021, attack, would be arrested by FBI agents in Virginia.

On the fifth anniversary of the attack, the second Trump administration published a website with a false telling of events, which The Washington Post described as a part of "Trump’s years-long effort to reshape the narrative surrounding the day when a mob of his supporters violently overran the U.S. Capitol."

=== Domestic reactions ===
Donald Trump made another statement after the riot on January 7, 2021.

In the aftermath of the attack, after drawing widespread condemnation from the U.S. Congress, members of his administration, and the media, 45th U.S. president Donald Trump released a video-recorded statement on January 7, reportedly to stop the resignations of his staff and the threats of impeachment or removal from office. In the statement, he condemned the violence at the U.S. Capitol, saying that "a new administration will be inaugurated", which was widely seen as a concession, and his "focus now turns to ensuring a smooth, orderly, and seamless transition of power" to the Joe Biden administration. Vanity Fair reported that Trump was at least partially convinced to make the statement by U.S. senator Lindsey Graham (R-SC), who told Trump a sufficient number of Senate Republicans would support removing him from office unless he conceded. Kayleigh McEnany, the White House press secretary, had attempted to distance the administration from the rioters' behavior in a televised statement earlier in the day. On January 9, The New York Times reported that Trump had told White House aides he regretted committing to an orderly transition of power and would never resign from office. In a March 25 interview on Fox News, Trump defended the Capitol attackers, saying they were patriots who posed "zero threat", and he criticized law enforcement for "persecuting" the rioters.

The Joint Chiefs of Staff issued a statement on January 12 condemning the attack and reminding military personnel everywhere that incoming president Joe Biden was about to become their commander-in-chief, saying "... the rights of freedom of speech and assembly do not give anyone the right to resort to violence, sedition, and insurrection". The statement also said, "As we have done throughout our history, the U.S. military will obey lawful orders from civilian leadership, support civilian authorities to protect lives and property, ensure public safety in accordance with the law, and remain fully committed to protecting and defending the Constitution of the United States against all enemies, foreign and domestic". U.S. senator Mitch McConnell (R–KY), then the Senate majority leader, called it a "failed insurrection", that "the mob was fed lies", and "they were provoked by the president and other powerful people". Christopher Wray, the director of the Federal Bureau of Investigation (FBI) since 2017, later characterized the incident as domestic terrorism. President Biden, who described the rioters as "terrorists" aimed at "overturning the will of the American people" later shared this opinion. In early 2021, the RAND Corporation released a framework to reduce the risk of extremist activity in the U.S. military.

House speaker Nancy Pelosi had the flags at the Capitol lowered to half-staff in honor of Brian Sicknick, a United States Capitol Police officer who died following the attacks. Trump initially declined to lower flags at the White House or other federal buildings under his control, before changing his mind four days later. Biden, Mike Pence, and Pelosi offered condolences to Sicknick's family; Trump did not. After Sicknick's death, Senator Ted Cruz (R-TX) received backlash for previous speeches that were perceived as calls for violence.

A survey by the Hobby School of Public Affairs at the University of Houston taken January 12–20 showed that nearly a third (32%) of Texas Republicans supported the attack, although overall 83% of all Texans who expressed an opinion were opposed to it. In a poll of Americans just after the attack, 79% of those surveyed said America is "falling apart". In February 2022, the Republican National Committee called the events of January 6 "legitimate political discourse".

The US art world reacted through the chronicling of the day as well as the creation of new work. Starting January 7, 2021, the Smithsonian Museum enacted its "rapid-response protocol" to gather rally signs, posters, flags, and weapons abandoned on the National Mall and began work on a digital arts exhibit. Visual artist Paul Chan created his "A drawing as a recording of an insurrection", a 163-inch (4.1 m) double-sided drawing exhibited at the Greene Naftali Gallery in New York. In December 2022, literary press Whiskey Tit released Tell Me What You See, the first fiction published about the attack. At the one-year anniversary, One Six Comics published graphic novel series 1/6 with an accompanying education and action guide by the Western States Center. The Society of Classical Poets website posted various poems about the day, including one glorifying deceased rioter Ashli Babbitt.

Biden, Harris, civil rights groups and celebrities immediately criticized the Capitol Police for a perceived "double standard" in the treatment of the protesters and rioters, who were mostly white. Biden stated, "No one can tell me that if it had been a group of Black Lives Matter protesting yesterday they wouldn't have been treated very, very differently than the mob of thugs that stormed the Capitol. We all know that's true and it is unacceptable". Harris stated, "We witnessed two systems of justice when we saw one that let extremists storm the United States Capitol and another that released tear gas on peaceful protestors (Black Lives Matter) last summer". Michelle Obama wrote, "Yesterday made it painfully clear that certain Americans are, in fact, allowed to denigrate the flag and symbols of our nation. They've just got to look the right way". Capitol Police chief Steven Sund, who later resigned, explained they had prepared for a peaceful protest but were overwhelmed by an "angry, violent mob". Later in the year, at a White House ceremony to thank officers who responded to the attack that day, Biden and Harris congratulated the police on their response, calling them "heroes".

=== International reactions ===
More than seventy countries and international organizations expressed their concerns over the attack and condemned the violence, with some specifically condemning President Donald Trump's own role in inciting the attack. Foreign leaders, diplomats, politicians, and institutions expressed shock, outrage, and condemnation of the events. Multiple world leaders made a call for peace, describing the assault as "an attack on democracy". The leaders of some countries, including Brazil, Poland, and Hungary, declined to condemn the situation, and described it as an internal U.S. affair.

As early as January 2021, a few European security officials described the events as an attempted coup.

=== 14th Amendment disqualification ===
In late 2022 Trump announced his candidacy for the 2024 presidential election. Some legal scholars argued that Trump should be barred from presidential office under section 3 of the Fourteenth Amendment to the United States Constitution because of his apparent support for the attack. Three states, Maine, Colorado, and Illinois, issued rulings to disqualify Trump from appearing on election ballots, with Trump appealing in Trump v. Anderson. The Supreme Court unanimously ruled on March 4, 2024, that states could not remove Trump from the ballot. Following Biden's withdrawal from the race in July, Trump ultimately defeated Kamala Harris the election in November, being inaugurated for a second term on January 20, 2025, with JD Vance as his vice president.

Other public officials involved in the January 6 attack have also faced disqualification under the Fourteenth Amendment. Otero County, New Mexico, commissioner Couy Griffin was disqualified and removed from office while Congressional representative Marjorie Taylor Greene survived a similar challenge.

=== Sarbanes–Oxley Act prosecutions ===
Over 350 defendants, including Trump, were charged with obstructing an official proceeding under the 2002 Sarbanes-Oxley Act. Prior to the January 6 prosecutions, such charges had never been brought in cases that did not involve evidence tampering. In Fischer v. United States, the U.S. Supreme Court ruled 6–3 on non-ideological lines in favor of defendant Joseph Fischer and found that the obstruction charges in the case were overbroad, as they did not apply to evidence tampering, although charges against Trump could potentially proceed. Soon after the ruling, other January 6 criminal cases were reopened to adhere to the Fischer ruling and further usage of obstruction charges against January 6 defendants was stopped.

In 2025, the U.S. Attorney's Office for the District of Columbia initiated an internal review of its prosecutions of January 6 defendants under the Sarbanes-Oxley Act.

=== 2025 pardons and commutations ===
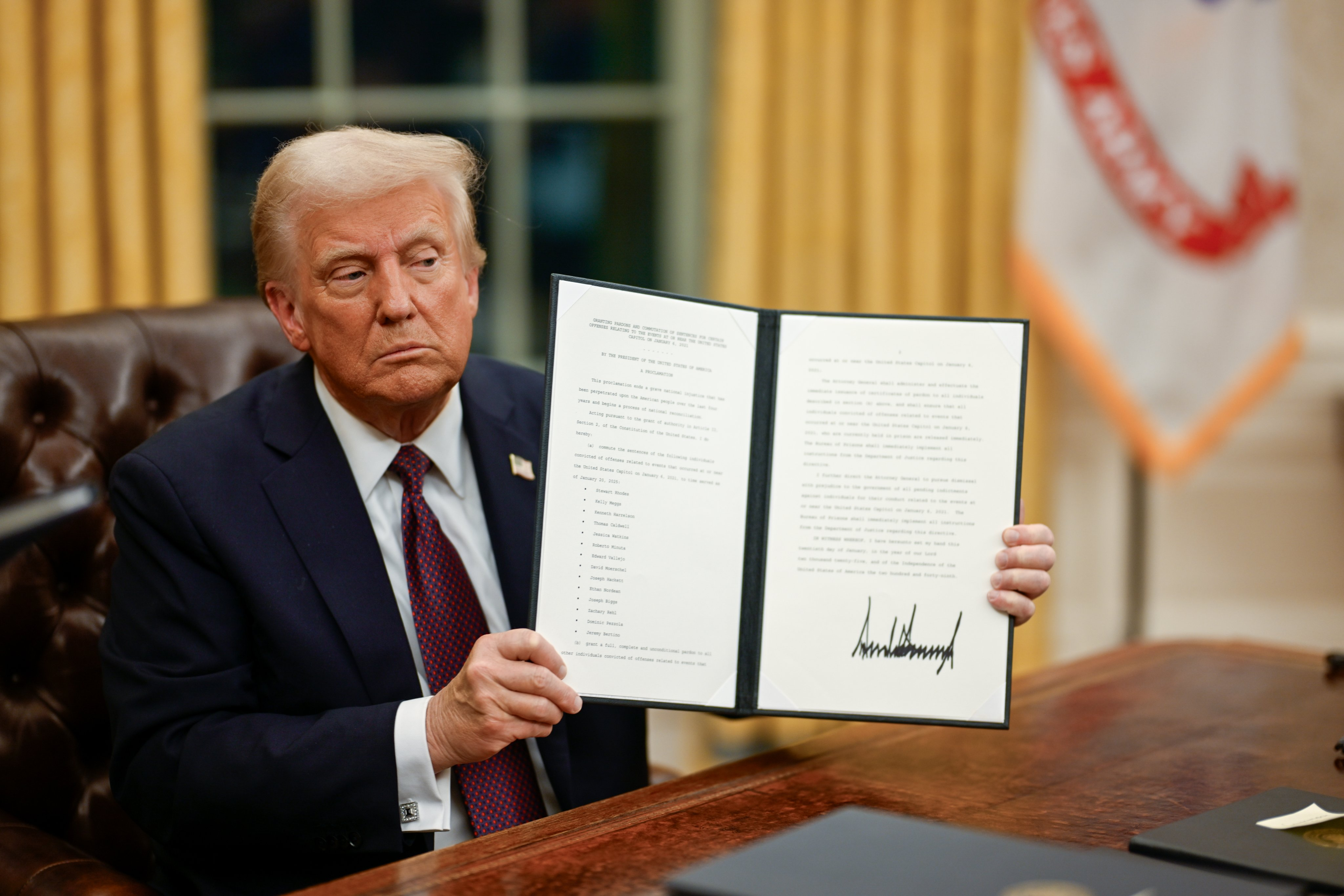
On January 20, 2025, U.S. president Donald Trump signed executive order granting pardons and commutations to over 1,500 individuals involved in the January 6 attack.

On January 20, 2025, on his last day in office, U.S. president Joe Biden granted pardons to all members of the House Select Committee that had investigated the January 6 attack, as well as their staff and the officers who testified. Later that day, on the first day of his second term, U.S. president Donald Trump issued a proclamation granting clemency to approximately 1,200 individuals convicted for their involvement in the January 6 attack on the U.S. Capitol, and dismissing the cases of the remaining approximately 300 charged individuals. The pardon extended to those charged with vandalism and assaults on law enforcement officers, including members of the Proud Boys and the Oath Keepers. Following the pardons, Trump ordered the DOJ to purge previously published press releases about the arrests and convictions of those pardoned. Soon after, video evidence of the attack likewise began being purged from government databases.

== Analysis and terminology ==
A week following the attack, journalists were searching for an appropriate word to describe the event. According to the Associated Press, U.S. media outlets first described the developments on January 6 as "a rally or protest", but as the events of the day escalated and further reporting and images emerged, the descriptions shifted to "an assault, a riot, an insurrection, domestic terrorism or even a coup attempt". It was variably observed that the media outlets were settling on the terms "riot" and "insurrection".

According to NPR, "By definition, 'insurrection', and its derivative, 'insurgency', are accurate. 'Riot' and 'mob' are equally correct. While these words are not interchangeable, they are all suitable when describing Jan. 6." The New York Times assessed the event as having brought the United States "hours away from a full-blown constitutional crisis". Brian Stelter in CNN Business wrote that the events of the Capitol attack "will be remembered as an act of domestic terrorism against the United States". Although several of the rioters were charged with the crime of "seditious conspiracy", none of them were criminally charged with the crime of "insurrection", including Trump.

The attack was widely described as an attempted coup d'état or self-coup. Federal judge David Carter described Trump's actions as "a coup in search of a legal theory". Naunihal Singh of the U.S. Naval War College, and author of Seizing Power: The Strategic Logic of Military Coups, wrote that the attack on the Capitol was "an insurrection, a violent uprising against the government" and "sedition", but not a coup because Trump did not order the military "to seize power on his behalf". The Coup D'état Project of the Cline Center for Advanced Social Research at the University of Illinois, which tracks coups and coup attempts globally, classified the attack as an "attempted dissident coup", defined as an unsuccessful coup attempt "initiated by a small group of discontents" such as "ex-military leaders, religious leaders, former government leaders, members of a legislature/parliament, and civilians [but not police or the military]". The Cline Center said the "organized, illegal attempt to intervene in the presidential transition" by displacing Congress met this definition. Some political scientists identified the attack as an attempted self-coup, in which the head of government attempts to strong-arm the other branches of government to entrench power. Academic Fiona Hill, a former member of Trump's National Security Council, described the attack, and Trump's actions in the months leading up to it, as an attempted self-coup. Experts have differed about whether the events on January 6 amounted to a coup or the like, some say yes, some say no. News reporting about scholarly opinions reflects that division.

The FBI classified the attack as domestic terrorism. At the Senate Judiciary Committee meeting on March 2, 2021, Wray testified:

I was appalled, like you, at the violence and destruction that we saw that day. I was appalled that you, our country's elected leaders, were victimized right here in these very halls. That attack, that siege was criminal behavior, plain and simple, and it's behavior that we, the FBI, view as domestic terrorism. It's got no place in our democracy and tolerating it would make a mockery of our nation's rule of law.

The Congressional Research Service also concluded that the attack met the federal definition of domestic terrorism. Republican senator Ted Cruz characterized it as terrorism at least eighteen times over the ensuing year, though he was among the Senate Republicans who blocked a bipartisan January 6 commission to investigate it.

On January 4, 2021, Steve Bannon, while discussing the planning for the upcoming events and speech by Trump on January 6 at The Ellipse, described it as a "bloodless coup".

A March 2023 poll found that 20.5 percent of respondents believed that violence to achieve a political goal is sometimes justified. Nearly 12 percent expressed their willingness to use force to restore Trump to power. A June 2023 poll found that about 12 million American adults, or 4.4 percent of the adult population, believed violence is justified in returning Trump to the White House.

=== Historians' perspectives ===
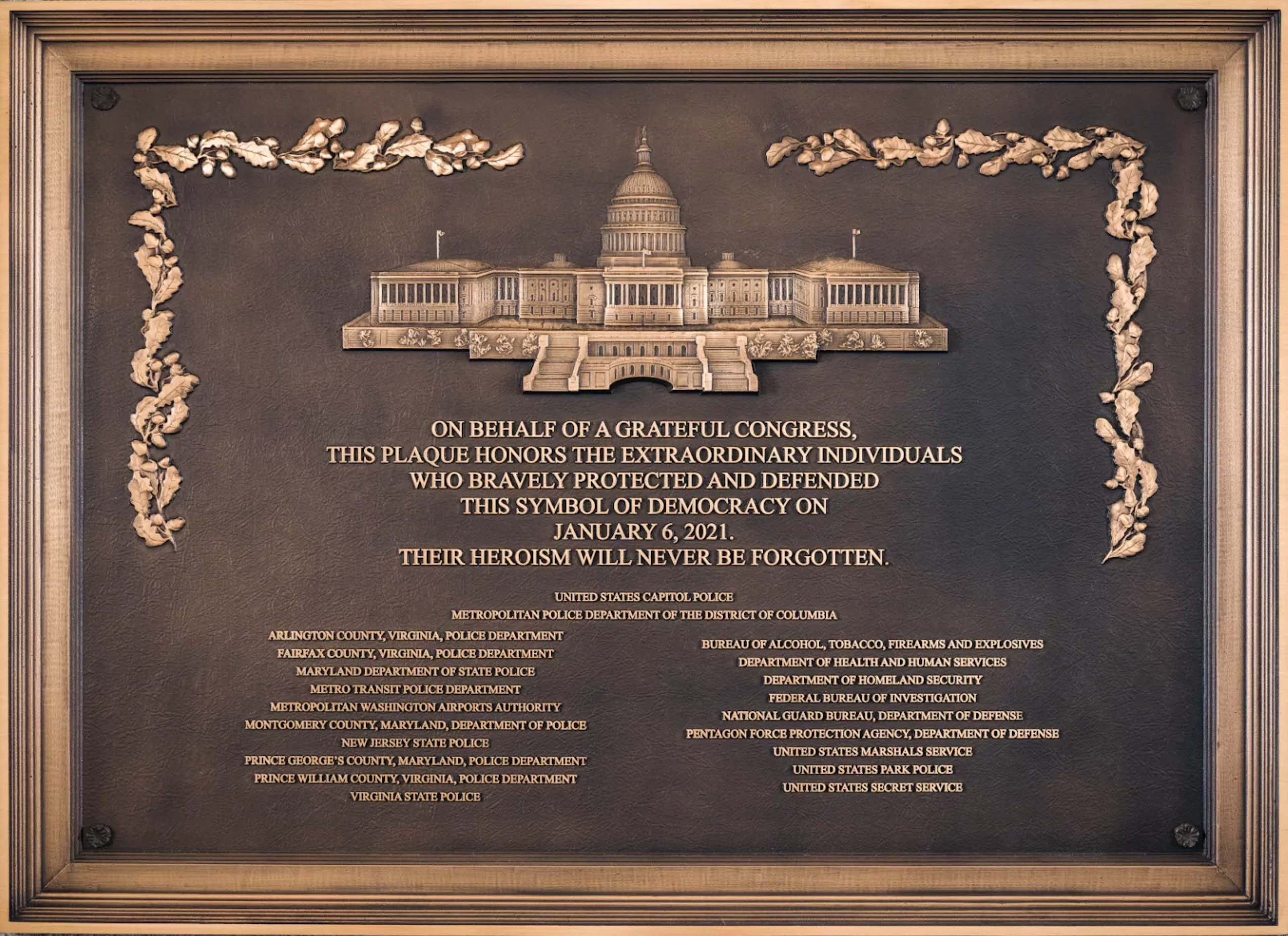
A commemorative plaque honoring those who protected the US Capitol on January 6 sat for years out of sight in the Capitol basement, surrounded by maintenance equipment. A 2022 law mandating the plaque stated it must be placed "at a permanent location on the western front". In March 2026, more than five years after the attack, it was placed on a wall inside the Capitol, in an area closed to all tours and accessible by visitors only if they are escorted.

While there have been other instances of violence at the Capitol in the 19th and 20th centuries, this event was the most severe assault on the building since the 1814 burning of Washington by British forces during the War of 1812. The last attempt on the life of the vice president was a bomb plot against Thomas Marshall in July 1915. For the first time in U.S. history, a Confederate battle flag was flown inside the Capitol. The Confederate States Army had never reached the Capitol, nor come closer than 6 miles (10 km) from the Capitol at the Battle of Fort Stevens, during the American Civil War. (Note: However, from 1894 to 2020, the flag of Mississippi contained a Confederate battle flag in its design and had been displayed in the Capitol building. The flag was carried during the attack by Kevin Seefried, who traveled from his home in Delaware to hear Trump speak, bringing the flag he had displayed outside his house. Seefried and his son, who helped clear a broken window for them to gain access into the Capitol, were indicted by a grand jury.)

Douglas Brinkley, a historian at Rice University, remarked on how January 6 would be remembered in American history: "Now every January 6, we're going to have to remember what happened ... I worry if we lose the date that it will lose some of its wallop over time". He also wrote about Trump's responsibility during the attack: "There are always going to be puzzle pieces added to what occurred on January 6, because the president of the United States was sitting there watching this on television in the White House, as we all know, allowing it to go on and on".

On the first anniversary of the attack, historians Doris Kearns Goodwin and Jon Meacham warned that the U.S. remained at "a crucial turning point". Meacham commented, "What you saw a year ago today was the worst instincts of both human nature and American politics and it's either a step on the way to the abyss or it is a call to arms figuratively for citizens to engage".

Robert Paxton considered the attack to be evidence that Trump's movement was an example of fascism, a characterization that Paxton had resisted up to that point. Paxton compared the event to the French 6 February 1934 crisis.

Richard J. Evans said that it was not a coup, but that it did represent a danger to democracy in the U.S.

Other scholars expressed concern about how history would portray the attack and its aftermath. Larry Sabato, director of the University of Virginia's Center for Politics, stated that reframing the insurrection as a "sightseeing tour" by the GOP has given "the far-right extremists, the neo-Nazi white supremacists who are obsessed with January 6, the counter reality they've been looking for of a bunch of patriots taking a tour in the Capitol".

A memorial plaque honoring Capitol police officers who were injured that day was installed at 4 a.m. on Saturday morning March 7, 2026.

== See also ==
- 1983 United States Senate bombing – Terror attack in Washington, DC, US
- Brooks Brothers riot – 2000 U.S. political demonstration
- Democratic backsliding in the United States
- Demonstrations in support of Donald Trump
- Enough – A memoir by Cassidy Hutchinson
- Newburgh Conspiracy – 1783 planned Continental Army coup
- Pre-election lawsuits related to the 2020 United States presidential election
- Protests against Donald Trump's first presidential inauguration
- Republican efforts to restrict voting following the 2020 presidential election
- Republican reactions to Donald Trump's claims of 2020 election fraud
- Right-wing terrorism – Form of terrorism motivated by right-wing or far-right beliefs
- United Airlines Flight 93 – A hijacked plane intended to be flown into the U.S. Capitol
- Wilmington massacre – 1898. A municipal-level coup d'état took place in Wilmington, NC that has been described as "America's Only Coup D'État" & "The Lost History of an American Coup D'État"
