= Law enforcement response to the January 6 United States Capitol attack =

During the January 6 United States Capitol attack, law enforcement mounted a response, initially failing to maintain security perimeters and protect parts of the building from being breached and occupied, but succeeding at protecting members of Congress, and subsequently, as reinforcements arrived, to secure the breached Capitol.

The United States Capitol Police (USCP) had not planned for a riot or attack. The Capitol Police Board – consisting of the Architect of the Capitol, the House Sergeant at Arms, and the Senate Sergeant at Arms – has the authority to request the National Guard to the Capitol but made the decision on January 3 not to do so. On January 6, USCP officers deployed without "less lethal" arms such as sting grenades. Department riot shields had been improperly stored, causing them to shatter upon impact. At 12:49 p.m., Capitol police responded to two bombs near the Capitol. Minutes later, rioters breached a police perimeter west of the Capitol building. By 2:12 p.m., rioters breached the Capitol building. Capitol and D.C. police then fought to protect Congress and restore order, while individuals at the Department of Defense waited over three hours to deploy the National Guard.

Capitol Police Chief Sund first requested assistance from the D.C. National Guard (DCNG) at 1:49 p.m. At 2:22 p.m. D.C. officials also requested National Guard deployment in a conference call with Pentagon leaders. After DoD refused to send immediate assistance, D.C. Mayor Muriel Bowser contacted the Public Safety Secretary of Virginia, Brian Moran, who immediately dispatched Virginia State Police to the District. At 2:49 p.m., the Governor of Virginia activated all available assets including the Virginia National Guard to aid the U.S. Capitol; the authorization from DoD required for legal deployment was not granted. By 3:10 p.m., police from Fairfax County, Virginia, were dispatched to the District, and began arriving at 3:15 p.m.

At 4:22 p.m., Trump issued a video message on social media in which he repeated his claims of electoral fraud, praised his supporters and told them to "go home". By 4:24 p.m., a 12-man armed FBI SWAT team had arrived at the Capitol Complex. Then-Acting Secretary of Defense Christopher Miller finally approved deployment of the National Guard at 4:32 p.m. Chairman of the Joint Chiefs of Staff, Mark Milley, later told the House committee that investigated January 6 that Pence, not Trump, had requested the deployment of the National Guard.

At 5:02, about 150 soldiers of the DCNG departed the D.C. Armory; the contingent reached the Capitol complex and began support operations at 5:40. However, Capitol Police, D.C. Metropolitan Police, and other responding law enforcement resources successfully established a perimeter on the west side of the U.S. Capitol prior to the arrival of the DCNG. At 8:00 p.m., the U.S. Capitol Police declared the Capitol building to be secure.

In the wake of the attack, law enforcement and Defense leaders faced criticism and calls for resignations.

== Intelligence predicting an attack on the Capitol ==
=== DHS, FBI, and local law enforcement ===
The June 2023 report by the Senate Committee on Homeland Security and Governmental Affairs about intelligence failures leading up to the attack

On October 30, 2020, Joseph B. Maher, the acting United States Department of Homeland Security (DHS) Undersecretary for Intelligence and Analysis, issued an internal memo stating that the department anticipates incidents of physical violence and civil unrest related to the period "leading up to, including, and immediately following" the election. In the same memo, Maher instituted limits on the dissemination of open-source intelligence reports on election-related security threats, citing "sensitivities and complexities" whereby "Civil unrest and election- or voter-related issues often invoke U.S. persons and First Amendment-protected activity".

On November 9, 2020, an intelligence analyst at the FBI Hazardous Devices School – a training center of the Federal Bureau of Investigation (FBI) – circulated an email prompted by an analysis done by the SITE Intelligence Group; the email contained a prediction of violence in connection with the Stop the Steal rallies and listed concerns about far-right groups' activities in the context of election-related misinformation. In an internal "situational information report" dated December 29, 2020, the FBI Minneapolis field office warned of armed protests at every state capitol, orchestrated by the far-right boogaloo movement, before President-elect Biden's inauguration.

Three days before the Capitol attack, the Capitol Police intelligence unit circulated a 12-page internal memo warning that Trump supporters see the day of the Electoral College vote count "as the last opportunity to overturn the results of the presidential election" and could use violence against "Congress itself" on that date.

On January 5, the local Joint Terrorism Task Force, which includes USCP and MPD as participants, was notified by the FBI of possible impending violence at the Capitol. This involved the sharing of an internal FBI document which warned of rioters preparing to travel to Washington and setting up staging areas in various regional states. The document used the term "war" to describe the rioters' motive, which mentioned specific violence references, including the blood of Black Lives Matter and antifa members. However, the FBI decided not to distribute a formal intelligence bulletin. The FBI spoke to more than a dozen known extremists and "was able to discourage those individuals from traveling to D.C.", according to a senior FBI official. The NYPD also shared information on extremist rhetoric and threats of violence with the Capitol Police in advance of the protest.

Also on January 5, Capitol Police chief Steven Sund hosted a meeting with a dozen top law enforcement and military officials from D.C., including the FBI, U.S. Secret Service, MPD, and the National Guard. According to Sund, "during the meeting, no entity, including the FBI, provided any intelligence indicating that there would be a violent attack on the United States Capitol by tens of thousands of protestors and hundreds of well-equipped rioters". Robert Contee, the acting Chief of the Metropolitan Police Department of the District of Columbia, said after the Capitol attack that his department had possessed no intelligence indicating the Capitol would be breached. Some security specialists later reported they had been surprised that they had not received information from the FBI and DHS before the event. Reflections on pre-event intelligence failures in the aftermath of the attack revealed the surprise that no threat assessments had been issued, with possible causes for the failure related to DHS personnel changes and law enforcement biases.

=== Non-governmental ===
On December 21, 2020, a U.K. political consultant who studies Trump-related extremism tweeted a forecast of what the planned event of January 6 would become, including deaths. In the days leading up to the attack, several organizations that monitored online extremism had been issuing warnings about the event. The Anti-Defamation League published a January 4 warning about calls to violently disrupt the counting. The post said the league was not aware of any credible threats of violence, but noted that "if the past is any indication, the combination of an extremist presence at the rallies and the heated nature of the rhetoric suggests that violence is a possibility". Also on January 4, British security firm G4S conducted a risk analysis, which found that there would be violent groups in Washington, D.C., between January 6 and Inauguration Day based on online posts advocating for violence. Advance Democracy, Inc., a nonpartisan governance watchdog, found 1,480 posts from accounts related to QAnon that referenced the events of January 6 in the six days leading up to it, including calls for violence.

== Preparations for January 6 ==
=== Police ===
According to U.S. Secretary of the Army Ryan D. McCarthy, law enforcement agencies' estimates of the potential size of the crowd, calculated in advance of the event, varied between 2,000 and 80,000. On January 5, the National Park Service estimated that 30,000 people would attend the "Save America" rally, based on people already in the area.

The Intelligence and Interagency Coordination Division of the Capitol Police made a threat analysis on January 3 which was drafted by a single employee who was not aided by a supervisor in writing and distributing the summary to Capitol Police leadership and others.

Sund said his department had developed a plan to respond to "First Amendment activities", but had not planned for the "criminal riotous behavior" they encountered. Sund said he directed the department to be placed on "all hands on deck" status, (Note: Contrary to early reports.) which meant every sworn officer would be working. He also said he activated seven Civil Disturbance Unit platoons, approximately 250 officers, with four of those platoons equipped in helmets, protective clothing and shields. On January 6, under "orders from leadership", the police force deployed without "less lethal" arms such as sting grenades. Department riot shields had been improperly stored, causing them to shatter upon impact.

On January 4, D.C. Mayor Bowser announced that the Metropolitan Police Department of the District of Columbia (MPD) would lead law enforcement for the event, and would coordinate with the Capitol Police, the U.S. Park Police, and the Secret Service. (Note: Jurisdictionally, MPD is responsible for city streets of the National Mall and Capitol area, whereas the Park Police are responsible for the Ellipse (the site of Trump's speech and rally that day), the Secret Service is responsible for the vicinity of the White House, and the Capitol Police is responsible for the Capitol complex itself.) "To be clear, the District of Columbia is not requesting other federal law enforcement personnel and discourages any additional deployment without immediate notification to, and consultation with, MPD if such plans are underway", Bowser wrote in a letter to the Department of Justice.

=== Department of Defense ===
Days after the 2020 election, on November 9, Donald Trump fired Defense Secretary Mark Esper, replacing him with Christopher C. Miller. On December 31, 2020, Mayor Muriel Bowser requested District of Columbia National Guard troops be deployed to support D.C. police during the expected demonstrations. In her request, she wrote that the guards would not be armed and that they would be primarily responsible for "crowd management" and traffic direction, allowing police to focus on security concerns. Miller approved the request on January 4, 2021, activating 340 troops, with no more than 114 to be deployed at any given time. In a January 4 memo, Miller prohibited deploying D.C. Guard members with weapons, helmets, body armor or riot control agents without his personal approval.

Three days before the riots, the Department of Defense twice offered to deploy the National Guard to the Capitol, but was told by the Capitol Police it would not be necessary. On January 3, Sund was reportedly refused additional National Guard support by House Sergeant-at-Arms Paul D. Irving and Senate Sergeant-at-Arms Michael C. Stenger. On January 5, Secretary of the Army Ryan McCarthy issued a memo directly placing limits on D.C. National Guard. The commanding general of the D.C. National Guard, Major General William J. Walker, explained the change, saying: "All military commanders normally have immediate response authority to protect property, life, and in my case, federal functions – federal property and life. But in this instance, I did not have that authority."

According to Miller's later statements, on January 3, Miller was ordered by Trump to "do whatever was necessary to protect the demonstrators" on January 6. On January 22, Miller disputed the criticism that the Pentagon had delayed deployment of the Guard, calling it "complete horseshit".

== January 6 response ==
=== Timeline of security collapse and breach ===
- 12:00 p.m.: A Federal Protective Service briefing email states that there are about 300 Proud Boys at the Capitol threatening to shut down the water system.
- 12:30 p.m.: Crowds of pro-Trump supporters gather outside the U.S. Capitol building.
- 12:49 p.m.: Capitol Police respond to a report of a possible explosive device at the Republican National Committee Headquarters, which is later identified as a pipe bomb. Shortly afterwards, a second pipe bomb is found at the headquarters of the Democratic National Committee. Buildings next to these headquarters are evacuated.
  - A police sweep of the area identifies a vehicle which held one handgun, an M4 Carbine assault rifle with loaded magazine, and components for 11 Molotov cocktails with homemade napalm. Around 6:30 p.m, the driver was apprehended carrying two unregistered handguns as he returned to the vehicle. He is not suspected of planting the pipe bombs.
- 12:53 p.m.: A police perimeter west of the Capitol building is breached. The breach is reported by Federal Protective Service officers. By 1:03 p.m., a vanguard of rioters have overrun three layers of barricades and have forced police officers to the base of the west Capitol steps.
- 1:26 p.m.: The U.S. Capitol Police order evacuation of at least two buildings in the Capitol complex, including the Cannon House Office Building and the Madison Building of the Library of Congress.
- 1:30 p.m.: Capitol Police are overwhelmed and forced to retreat up the steps of the Capitol.
- 1:34 p.m.: D.C. Mayor Muriel Bowser requests via phone that Army Secretary Ryan McCarthy deploy the Guard.
- 1:50 p.m.: D.C. Metropolitan Police on-scene incident commander Robert Glover declares a riot.
- 1:58 p.m.: Along the east side of the Capitol, a much smaller police presence retreats from a different mob, removing a barrier along the northeast corner of the building. At 2:00 p.m. the mob removes the last barrier protecting the east side of the Capitol.
- 1:59 p.m.: Chief Sund receives the first reports that rioters have reached the Capitol's doors and windows and are trying to break in.

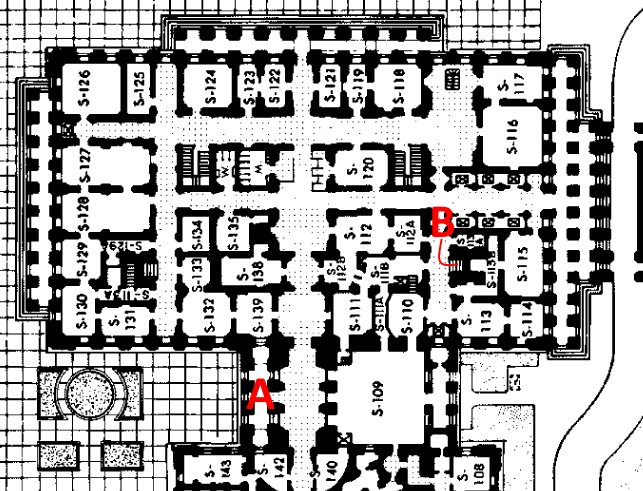
Floorplan of the first floor of the Senate side of the Capitol. "A" indicates the location of the first breach into the building at 2:11 p.m. "B" indicates the location of a Capitol Police officer in a doorway before retreating up stairs at 2:14 p.m.

- 2:11 p.m.: Rioter Dominic Pezzola breaks a window on the northwest side of the Capitol with a plastic shield.
- 2:12 p.m.: The first rioter enters the Capitol through the broken window, opening a door for others.
- 2:13 p.m.: Vice President Pence is removed from the Senate chamber to a nearby office. The Senate is called into recess.
- 2:14 p.m.:
  - Rioters chase a lone Capitol Police officer up northwest stairs, where there are doors to the Senate chamber in both directions, as police inside the chamber attempt to lock doors. If the mob had arrived about a minute earlier, it would have been in sight of Vice President Pence as he was moved into an office about 100 feet (30 m) from the landing. Officer Eugene Goodman leads the mob to backup in front of a set of Senate doors while senators inside attempt to evacuate.
  - As Representative Gosar speaks to the House against certifying Arizona's electoral votes, Speaker of the House Nancy Pelosi (D-CA) is removed from the chamber by her protective detail.
  - Federal Protective Service officers report that the Capitol has been breached.
- 2:16 p.m.: Federal Protective Service officers report that the House and Senate are being locked down.
- 2:20 p.m.: The House adjourns and starts to evacuate.
- 2:23 p.m.: Rioters attempt to breach the police line formed by barricades of bicycle racks. As a police lieutenant sprays the crowd with a chemical substance, rioter Julian Elie Khater raises his arm above the mob and sprays a chemical substance toward Capitol Police officer Brian Sicknick, who dies the following day from a stroke.

=== Bombs discovered near Capitol Complex ===
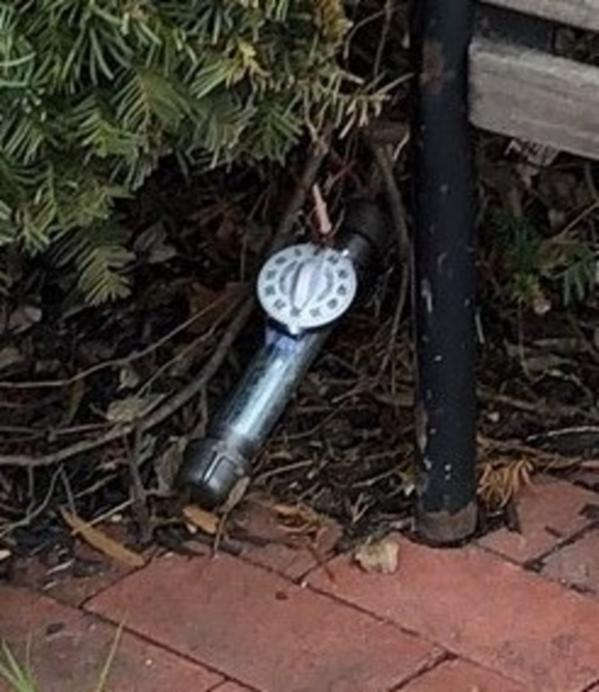
One of two pipe bombs discovered adjacent to the Capitol on January 6

Around 12:45 p.m., a bomb was discovered next to a building containing Republican National Committee (RNC) offices by a woman using the shared alleyway to access her apartment building's laundry room. She alerted RNC security, which investigated and summoned law enforcement; U.S. Capitol Police, FBI agents and the Bureau of Alcohol, Tobacco, Firearms and Explosives (ATF) all responded to the RNC bomb.

About thirty minutes later, while officers were still responding at the RNC, they were informed a second pipe bomb had been discovered under a bush at the Democratic National Committee (DNC) headquarters. Vice President-elect Kamala Harris was inside the DNC headquarters at the time the pipe bomb was discovered. Capitol Police began investigating the DNC pipe bomb at 1:07 p.m., and Harris was evacuated at approximately 1:14 p.m. The devices were of a similar design – about one foot (30 cm) in length. They were rendered safe by bomb squads; the pipe bomb at the RNC was neutralized at 3:33 p.m. and the pipe bomb at the DNC was neutralized at 4:36 p.m., according to a Capitol Police timeline. The bombs were fully functional and constructed of galvanized steel pipes, homemade black powder, and kitchen timers. The FBI stated that the bombs "were viable and could have been detonated, resulting in serious injury or death". Sund told The Washington Post on January 10 that he suspected the pipe bombs were intentionally placed to draw police away from the Capitol; Representative Tim Ryan (D-Ohio) echoed the sentiment in a virtual news conference on January 11, saying, "[W]e do believe there was some level of coordination ... because of the pipe bombs ... that immediately drew attention away from the breach that was happening". The Inspector General of the Capitol Police later concluded, "If those pipe bombs were intended to be diversion... it worked". As the mob of Trump supporters attacked the Capitol, the discovery of the pipe bombs diverted a large number of already-outnumbered law enforcement officers from the Capitol. Capitol Police Inspector General Michael Bolton testified before Congress that "the bombs drew three teams to investigate" and left only one squad at the Capitol. The FBI publicly released several videos of the suspect walking around at the time the bombs were placed, along with the bomber's suspected route, and has confirmed that the suspect placed the bombs between 7:30 and 8:30 p.m. on the night of January 5, and wore a gray hooded sweatshirt, face mask, glasses, and gloves; carried a backpack; and wore a black and light gray Nike Air Max Speed Turfs with a yellow Nike symbol. Despite an intense FBI investigation spanning more than a year, a suspect was never named in the pipe bombings. The FBI has offered a $500,000 reward for information about the suspect.

On January 7, 2025, Trump claimed that the FBI had identified a suspect. In February, podcaster Dan Bongino, who was about to step into the role of deputy director of the FBI, claimed the attempted pipe bomb had been "an inside job" and that "the F.B.I. knows who this person is". Ten months later, on December 4, 2025, Brian Cole, Jr. was arrested in Virginia. Investigators said there is no evidence that Cole has any connections to the US government, foreign countries, or political organizations. While he reportedly told the FBI that he believed conspiracy theories that claimed the 2020 election was rigged in Biden's favor, Cole began purchasing components of the bombs in 2019, and the FBI has not ascribed to him any specific motive. Cole told investigators that he "was going to a protest in support of [then President] Trump", but when asked why he planted bombs outside of both the RNC and DNC buildings, Cole said "I really don't like either party at this point" and claimed that the planned attack was unrelated to the counting of the 2020 election results. Bongino officially left his FBI position on January 3, 2026, and Cole was indicted on January 6, after which Cole's lawyers argued for his freedom under Trump's mass pardon of the rioters.

=== Securing the breached Capitol ===
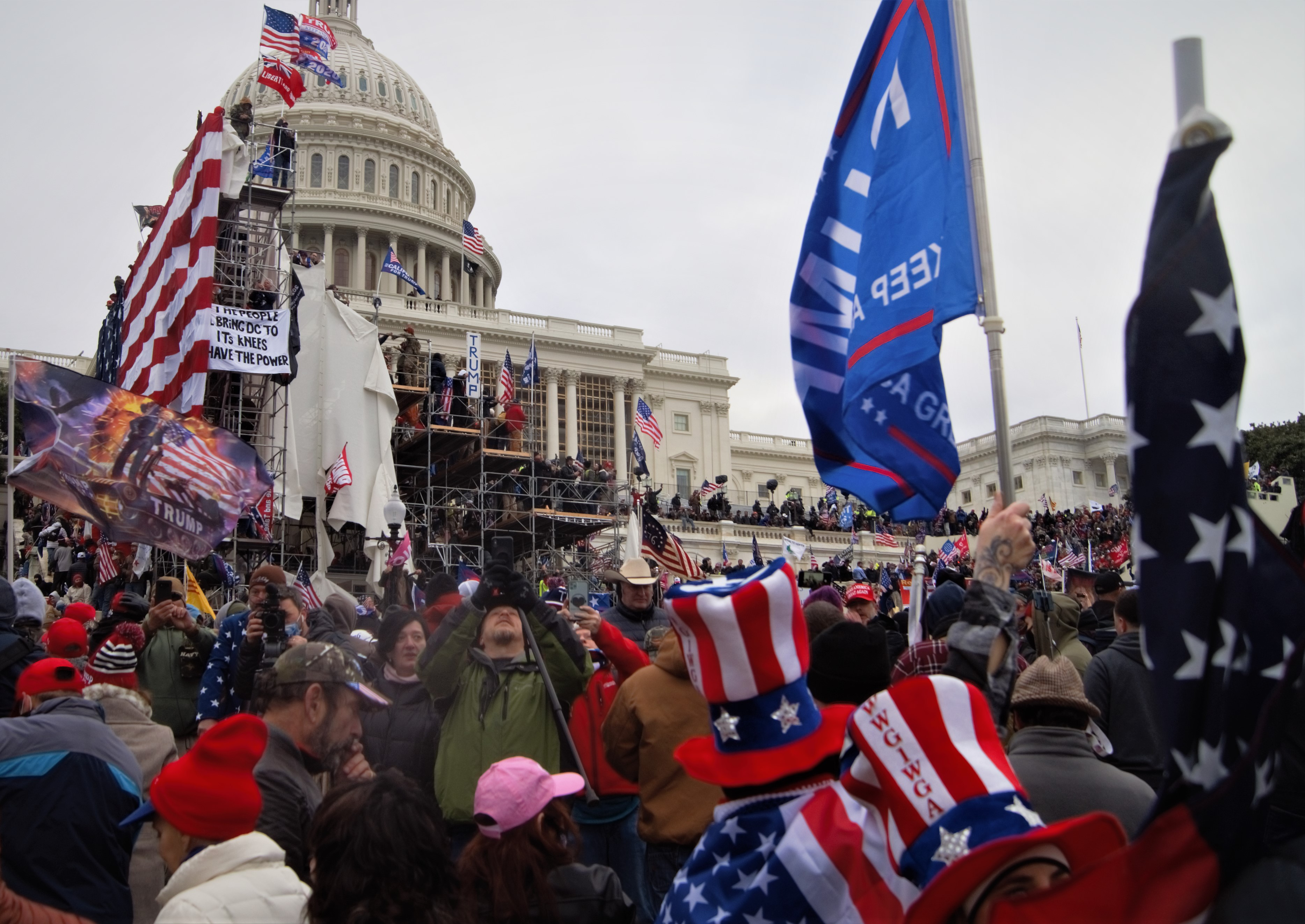
West steps of the Capitol at 2:46 p.m.

Capitol Police Chief Steven Sund joined a conference call with D.C. government and Pentagon officials at 2:26 p.m. where he "[made] an urgent, urgent immediate request for National Guard assistance", telling them he needed "boots on the ground". However, Lieutenant General Walter E. Piatt, Director of the Army Staff, said he could not recommend that Army Secretary Ryan McCarthy approve the request, telling Sund and others "I don't like the visual of the National Guard standing a police line with the Capitol in the background". Piatt later told The Washington Post he "did not make the statement or any comments similar to what was attributed to me by Chief Sund". Lieutenant General Charles A. Flynn, brother of retired Lieutenant General Michael Flynn, was also on the phone call. (Note: The Army initially denied Charles Flynn's participation but confirmed it on January 20, when Flynn himself told The Washington Post he had "entered the room after the call began and departed prior to the call ending".)

About 2:31, D.C. Mayor Muriel Bowser ordered a 6:00 p.m. curfew. Virginia Governor Ralph Northam also issued a curfew for nearby Alexandria and Arlington County in Northern Virginia.

Pentagon officials reportedly restricted D.C. guard troops from being deployed except as a measure of last resort, and from receiving ammunition and riot gear; troops were also instructed to engage with protesters only in situations warranting self-defense and could not share equipment with local police or use surveillance equipment without prior approval from Acting Defense Secretary Christopher C. Miller. McCarthy and Miller decided to deploy the entire 1,100-strong force of D.C. National Guard to quell violence. About 3:04, Miller spoke with Pence, Pelosi, McConnell and Schumer, and directed the National Guard and other "additional support" to respond to the riot. Early reports indicated that the order to deploy the National Guard was initially resisted by Trump, but approved by Pence. Miller has disputed this, saying Trump had already given authorization to use the National Guard prior to January 6. Around 3:30, Northam said he was working with Bowser and Congress leaders to respond and that he was sending members of the Virginia National Guard and 200 Virginia State Troopers to support D.C. law enforcement, at the mayor's request. At 3:45, Stenger told Sund he would ask Mitch McConnell for help expediting the National Guard authorization.

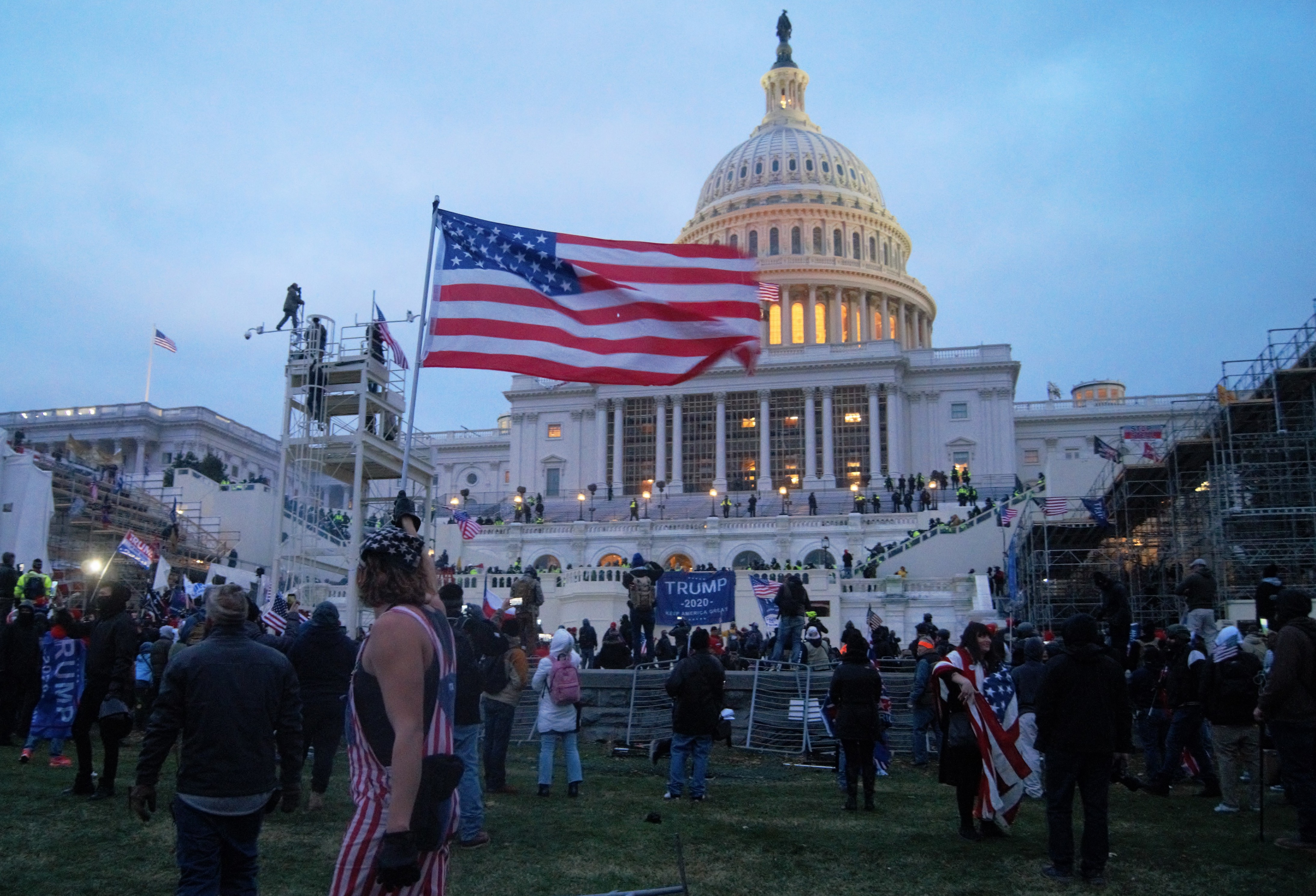
Rioters outside the Capitol after the building had been secured

It took more than three hours for police to retake control of the Capitol, using riot gear, shields, and batons, and up to eight hours to fully clear the Capitol and its grounds. Capitol Police were assisted by the D.C. Metropolitan Police, which sent 850 officers (more than a quarter of the total force) to the Capitol during the event, along with an additional 250 officers to the Capitol grounds. Armed DHS agents had been on standby near the Capitol in case of unrest but were not deployed until after the violence had subsided. Smoke grenades were deployed on the Senate side of the Capitol by Capitol Police working to clear rioters from the building. Black officers employed with Capitol Police reported being subjected to racial epithets (including repeated uses of "nigger") by some of the rioters. Capitol Police Chief Steven Sund said he believed the pipe bombs were a deliberate distraction which took significant USCP resources to contain the area and evacuate several Congressional office buildings. FBI and Department of Homeland Security agents wearing riot gear entered the Dirksen Senate Office Building around 4:30.

New Jersey Governor Phil Murphy announced at 4:57 that elements of the New Jersey State Police were being deployed to the District of Columbia at the request of D.C. officials, and the New Jersey National Guard was prepared for deployment if necessary. Shortly before 5:00, congressional leaders were reportedly being evacuated from the Capitol complex to Fort McNair, a nearby army base. Around 5:20, Maryland Governor Larry Hogan announced that he would send the Maryland State Police and Maryland National Guard, after speaking to the Secretary of the Army. Hogan's requests of the Defense Department to authorize National Guard troops to be deployed at the Capitol initially were denied in multiple instances. Around 5:40, the Senate Sergeant at Arms announced that the Capitol had been secured.

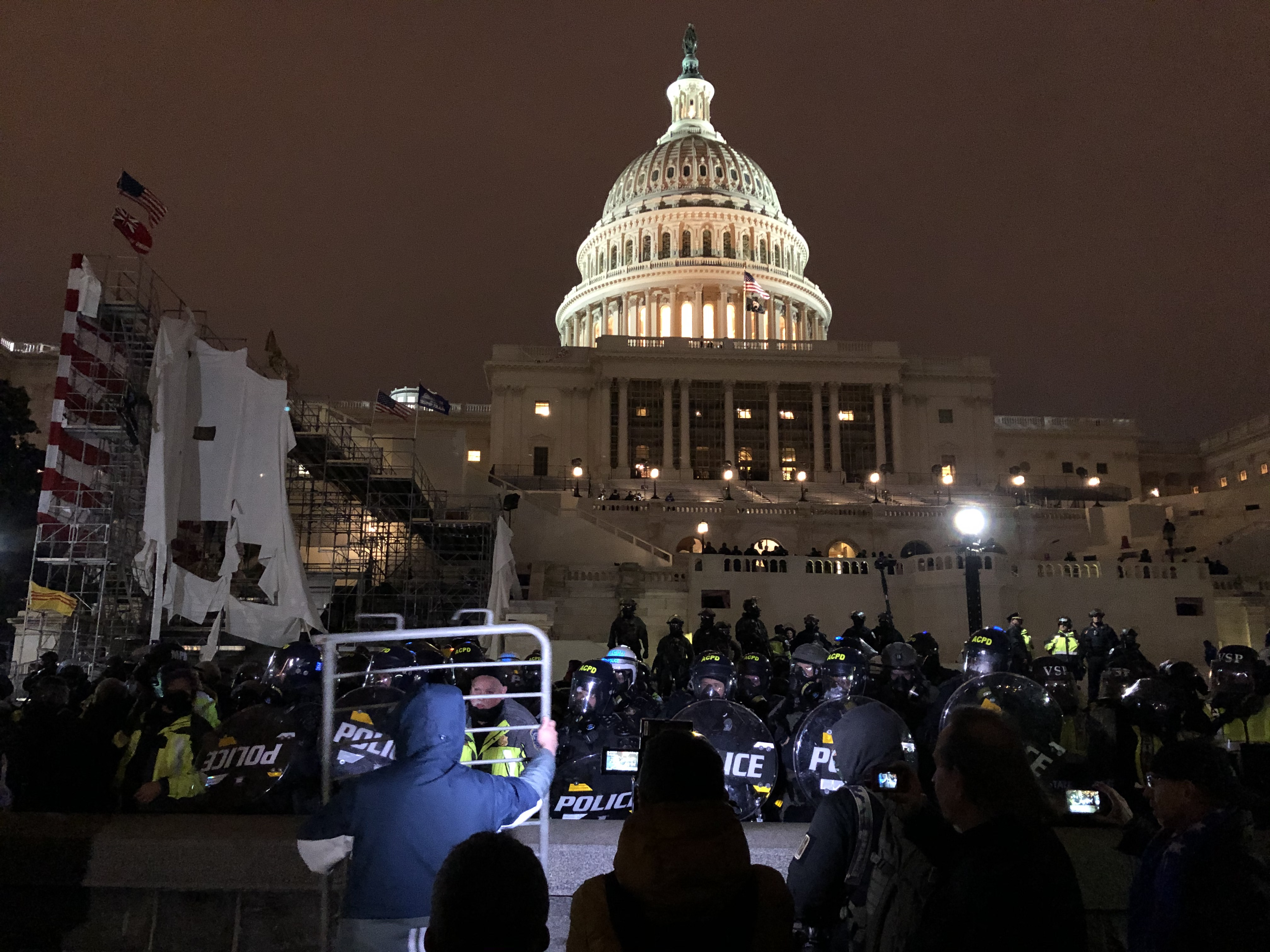
Riot police and protesters outside the Capitol during the evening of January 6

As police continued to try to push rioters away from the Capitol, protests continued, with some moving out of the Capitol Hill area. Some verbal and physical attacks on reporters were reported, with attackers denigrating media outlets as providing "fake news". One rioter told a CNN crew as they were being harassed by others, "There's more of us than you. We could absolutely fucking destroy you!" A video on social media recorded a man harassing an Israeli journalist covering the events live.

By 6:08 p.m., police had arrested at least thirteen people and seized five firearms. Although Bowser had ordered a 6:00 p.m. curfew, it went largely ignored by the pro-Trump rioters, hundreds of whom remained in the Capitol Hill area two hours after the curfew went into effect. By 6:14 p.m., Capitol Police, D.C. Metropolitan Police, and DCNG had successfully established a perimeter on the west side of the Capitol, and at 7:30 p.m., the Capitol Police declared the Capitol building to be secure.

==== Killing of Ashli Babbitt ====
At 2:44 p.m., as lawmakers were being evacuated by Capitol Police, Ashli Elizabeth Babbitt, a 35-year-old business owner and Air Force veteran, attempted to climb through a shattered window in a barricaded door and was shot in the neck/shoulder by Capitol Police lieutenant Michael Byrd (who was standing on the other side), dying from the wound.

In the minutes before she was shot, the crowd had threatened three uniformed officers posted outside the Speaker's Lobby, adjacent to the House chambers. One member of the mob yelled "Fuck the Blue". One officer guarding the door told the others "They're ready to roll", and upon the arrival of heavily armed police, the three officers moved away from the door. No longer impeded by police, Zachary Jordan Alam (who was standing next to Babbitt) smashed a glass window leading to the Speaker's Lobby; he was later indicted on twelve federal counts, including assaulting officers with a dangerous weapon. A fellow rally attendee who was near Babbitt recalled she had been warned not to proceed through the window: "A number of police and Secret Service were saying 'Get back! Get down! Get out of the way!'; she didn't heed the call."

Republican Representative Markwayne Mullin said he witnessed the shooting; he felt that Lt. Byrd "didn't have a choice" but to shoot, and that this action "saved people's lives". According to Mullin, at the time, law enforcement was trying to "defend two fronts" to the House Chamber, and "a lot of members [of Congress] and staff that were in danger at the time". Capitol Police officers had been warned that many attackers were carrying concealed weapons, although a subsequent search revealed no weapons in Babbitt's possession. Following the routine process for shootings by Capitol Police officers, the D.C. Metropolitan Police Department and the Justice Department investigated Babbitt's death and declined to charge Byrd with shooting her. The Capitol Police additionally said they would not discipline the lieutenant, whose action they deemed "lawful and within Department policy".

Babbitt was a follower of the QAnon conspiracy theory, and had tweeted the previous day "the storm is here", a reference to its prophecy. The shooting was recorded on several cameras, and footage was widely circulated. Babbitt has been called a martyr or a freedom fighter by Trump supporters, including far-right extremists. On the contrary, Democratic strategist Mark Burns and political commentator David Frum compared Babbitt's portrayal as a martyr to the Nazi glorification of Horst Wessel. Trump himself said "We must all demand justice for Ashli and her family." and referred to the police officer who shot Babbit as a "thug".

==== Police injuries ====
There were 138 officers (73 Capitol Police and 65 Metropolitan Police) injured, of whom 15 were hospitalized, some with severe injuries. All had been released from the hospital by January 11.

Shortly after 2:00 p.m., several rioters attempted to breach a door on the West Front of the Capitol. They dragged three D.C. Metro police officers out of formation and down a set of stairs, trapped them in a crowd, and assaulted them with improvised weapons (including hockey sticks, crutches, flags, poles, sticks, and stolen police shields) as the mob chanted "police stand down!" and "USA!". At least one of the officers was also stomped.

Some rioters beat officers on the head with lead pipes, and others used chemical irritants, stun guns, fists, sticks, poles and clubs against the police. Some trampled and stampeded police, pushed them down stairs or against statues or shone laser pointers into their eyes. One D.C. Metro officer was hit six times with a stun gun, was beaten with a flagpole, suffered a mild heart attack, and lost a fingertip. Three officers were hit on their heads by a fire extinguisher allegedly thrown by a retired firefighter.

According to the Capitol Police officers' union chairman, multiple officers sustained traumatic brain injuries. One had two cracked ribs and two smashed spinal discs; another lost an eye. One was stabbed with a metal fence stake. One was crushed between a door and a riot shield while defending the west side of the Capitol with other officers against rioters; he later had headaches he believed stemmed from a concussion. One was dragged by the leg and, a year later, still did not have full use of one arm.

As of June 3, 2021, at least 17 police officers (10 Capitol Police, seven Metropolitan Police) remained out of work due to injuries sustained in the riot five months previously. Of that number, six Metropolitan Police officers were still on medical leave in mid-July; the Capitol Police did not disclose how many of its officers were on leave, but confirmed that some officers had acquired career-ending disabilities.

=== Immediate aftermath ===
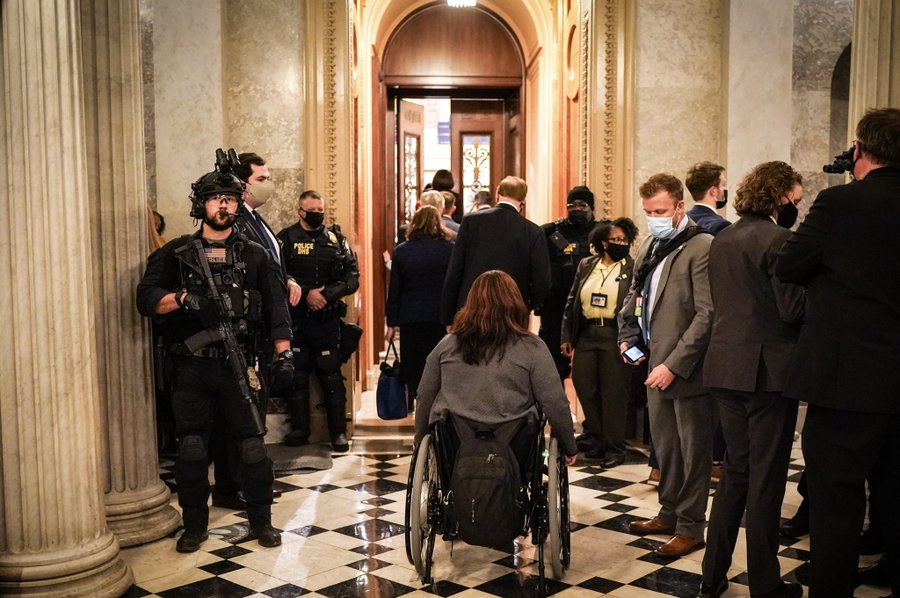
Senators returning to the chamber, flanked by police officers

The then New York Governor Andrew Cuomo pledged to deploy a thousand members of the New York National Guard to D.C., in addition to the resources promised by other states. On the night of January 6, Bowser issued an order extending the public emergency in Washington, D.C., for 15 days, writing in the order that she expected some people would "continue their violent protests through the inauguration". The following day, Secretary of the Army Ryan D. McCarthy announced that a fence would be built around the Capitol and remain in place for at least thirty days; construction began that same day. McCarthy also said New Jersey National Guard troops would be mobilized, as would troops from the Delaware, New York, and Pennsylvania National Guards.

By the end of the day, police had arrested 61 people for "unrest-related" offenses, with about half of these arrests occurring on the Capitol grounds.

A vehicle containing a semi-automatic rifle and a cooler containing eleven Molotov cocktails was also found nearby. The driver was subsequently arrested. He also had three handguns in his possession at the time of his arrest.

D.C. Metropolitan Police incurred high costs, preliminarily estimated to be $8.8 million, responding to the attack on the Capitol and securing downtown D.C. the week after.

==== Death of Brian Sicknick ====
On January 7, 2021, a United States Capitol Police (USCP) officer, Brian Sicknick, died in a hospital the day after collapsing at the U.S. Capitol after suffering two strokes. Sicknick had responded to the attack on January 6, during which he had been assaulted with pepper spray by two rioters. His cremated remains were laid in honor in the Capitol Rotunda on February 2, 2021, before they were buried with full honors at Arlington National Cemetery.

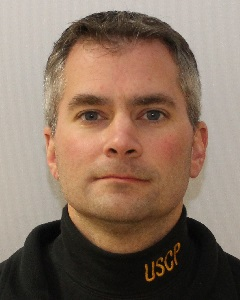
Capitol Police officer Brian Sicknick was assaulted by rioters. He died of a stroke the next day.

==== Suicides ====
Morale among the Capitol Police plummeted after the riot. The department responded to several incidents where its officers threatened to harm themselves; one officer turned in her weapon because she feared what she would do with it. Four officers from various police departments who responded to the attack died by suicide in the days and months that followed. Capitol Police Officer Howard Charles Liebengood died by suicide three days after the attack; he had worked three 24-hour shifts without sleep. Liebengood was survived by his wife Serena, and his two siblings. Liebengood's father was well known to many U.S. Senators and served as the United States Senate Sergeant at Arms.

D.C. Metropolitan Police Officer Jeffrey Smith, who was injured in the attack, died from a self-inflicted gunshot wound to the head at George Washington Memorial Parkway on January 15, after his concussion was misdiagnosed. Dr. Jonathan Arden, the former Chief Medical Examiner of the District of Columbia was hired by Smith's widow as part of her lawsuit to have her husband's suicide ruled "in the line of duty". His report said the "acute, precipitating event that caused the death of Officer Smith was his occupational exposure to the traumatic events he suffered on January 6, 2021". On July 30, his attorney David P. Weber filed the opening brief in the attempt, on behalf of Smith's widow, to have his death ruled line of duty. Submitting this report as evidence, on August 13, Smith's widow sued two of his alleged assailants, claiming they caused a traumatic brain injury with a crowbar or a heavy walking stick, leading to his death. According to media reports, Smith's alleged attackers who were named in the lawsuit were identified by an internet vigilante group that analyzed publicly available videos from the Capitol attack.

In the immediate aftermath of the attack, some members of Congress and press reports included Liebengood's and Smith's suicides in the number of reported casualties, for a total of seven deaths. In July, two more members of law enforcement who responded to the attack died by suicide: Metropolitan Police Officer Kyle Hendrik DeFreytag was found on July 10, and Metropolitan Police Officer Gunther Paul Hashida was found on July 29.

On August 5, 2021, Howard Charles Liebengood and Metropolitan Police officer Jeffrey L. Smith (along with Brian Sicknick and Billy Evans, whose deaths were not the result of suicide) were posthumously honored in a signing ceremony for a bill to award Congressional Gold Medals to Capitol Police and other January 6 responders. Their names are noted in the text of the bill, and Biden remarked on their deaths.

=== Timeline of reinforcement requests ===
C-SPAN broadcast of the Senate going into recess after rioters infiltrate the Capitol

- 12:58 p.m.: Capitol Police Chief Sund asks House Sergeant at Arms Paul D. Irving and Senate Sergeant at Arms Michael C. Stenger to declare an emergency and call for deployment of the National Guard. Irving and Stenger state that they will forward the request up their chains of command. Soon afterwards, aides to Congressional leaders arrive in Stenger's office and are outraged to learn that he has not yet called for any reinforcement. Phone records obtained at the Senate Hearings reflect that Sund first reached out to Irving to request the National Guard at 12:58 p.m. on the day of the attack. Sund then called the Senate sergeant-at-arms at the time, Michael Stenger, at 1:05 p.m. Sund repeated his request in a call at 1:28 p.m. and then again at 1:34 p.m., 1:39 p.m. and 1:45 p.m. that day.
- 1:49 p.m.: Capitol Police Chief Sund requests immediate assistance from District of Columbia National Guard (DCNG) Commander Major General William J. Walker. Major General Walker loads guardsmen onto buses in anticipation of receiving permission from the Secretary of the Army to deploy.
- 2:10 p.m.: House Sergeant at Arms Irving calls Chief Sund with formal approval to request assistance from the National Guard.
- 2:22 p.m.: Army Secretary McCarthy has a phone call with Mayor Bowser, D.C. Deputy Mayor John Falcicchio, Director of the D.C. Homeland Security and Emergency Management Agency Christopher Rodriguez, and leadership of the D.C. Metropolitan Police in which additional DCNG support is requested.
- 2:26 p.m.: D.C.'s homeland security director Chris Rodriquez coordinates a conference call with Mayor Bowser, the chiefs of the Capitol Police (Sund) and Metropolitan Police (Contee), and DCNG Maj. Gen. Walker. As the DCNG does not report to a governor, but to the President, Maj. Gen. Walker patched in the Office of the Secretary of the Army, noting that he would need Pentagon authorization to deploy. Lt. Gen. Walter E. Piatt, director of the Army Staff, noted that the Pentagon needed Capitol Police authorization to step onto Capitol grounds. Sund began describing the breach by rioters but the call became unintelligible as multiple people began asking questions at the same time. Metro Police Chief Robert Contee asked for clarification from Capitol Police Chief Sund: "Steve, are you requesting National Guard assistance at the Capitol?" to which Chief Sund replied, "I am making urgent, urgent, immediate request for National Guard assistance". According to Sund, Lt. Gen. Piatt stated, "I don't like the visual of the National Guard standing a police line with the Capitol in the background", and that he preferred that the Guard relieve police posts around D.C. to allow police to deploy to the Capitol. Sund pleaded with Lt. Gen. Piatt to send the Guard, but Lt. Gen. Piatt stated that only Army Secretary McCarthy had the authority to approve such a request and he could not recommend that Secretary McCarthy approve the request for assistance directly to the Capitol. The D.C. officials were subsequently described as "flabbergasted" at this message. McCarthy would later state that he was not in this conference call because he was already entering a meeting with senior Department leadership. Piatt contests this description of the call, denying that he talked about visuals and stating that he stayed on the conference call while senior Defense Department officials were meeting. The Army falsely denied for two weeks that Lt. Gen. Charles A. Flynn – the Army deputy chief of staff for Operations, Plans and Training – was in this call. His brother Michael Flynn, a retired Trump National Security Advisor, had pledged an oath to the QAnon conspiracy theory, though there are no indications that Lt. Gen. Flynn shares his brother's beliefs.
- 2:26 p.m.: After receipt of a call from D.C. Mayor Muriel E. Bowser indicating that DoD has refused to send assistance to the U.S. Capitol, the Public Safety Secretary of Virginia, Brian Moran, dispatches the Virginia State Police to the U.S. Capitol as permitted by mutual aid agreement with D.C.
- 2:26 p.m.: Security video shows Secret Service moving VP and family to new secure location.
- 2:28 p.m.: Chief Sund reiterates his request for National Guard support to help shore up the perimeter of the Capitol.
- 2:30 p.m.: Secretary Miller, Chairman of the Joint Chiefs of Staff Gen. Mark Milley, and Army Secretary McCarthy meet to discuss Capitol Police and D.C. government requests.
- 2:49 p.m.: After discussion with his chief of staff, Clark Mercer, Virginia Governor Ralph Northam activates all available assets of the State of Virginia including the Virginia National Guard to aid the U.S. Capitol. Authorization from DoD required for legal deployment of Virginia National Guard in D.C. was not granted.
- 3:04 p.m.: Secretary Miller, with advice from senior Defense leadership, formally approves "activation" of the 1,100 soldiers in the DCNG. Army Secretary McCarthy orders the DCNG to begin full "mobilization". Despite this, Miller "did not approve an operational plan to deploy the National Guard to the Capitol until 4:32 p.m.".
- 3:10 p.m.: Fairfax County, Virginia, deputy county executive Dave Rohrer informs county officials that county police are being dispatched to assist Capitol Police in response to a mutual aid request.
- 3:15 p.m.: House Speaker Pelosi calls the Governor of Virginia. Governor Northam confirms to Pelosi that all assets of the State of Virginia including the National Guard are being sent to aid the U.S. Capitol. First assets from Virginia begin rolling into D.C.
- 3:19 p.m.: Army Secretary McCarthy has a phone call with Senator Schumer and House Speaker Pelosi about Mayor Bowser's request. McCarthy explains that a full DCNG mobilization has been approved.
- 3:22 p.m.: Rohrer informs Fairfax County officials that the county is suspending fire, rescue, or emergency transportation to D.C. hospitals and "upgrading response and command structure".
- 3:26 p.m.: McCarthy has a phone call with Mayor Bowser and Metro Police Chief Contee conveying that their request has not been denied and that Secretary Miller has approved full activation of the DCNG.
- 3:32 p.m.: Governor Northam orders mobilization of Virginia National Guard forces in anticipation of a request for support according to Secretary of Defense timeline. Note inconsistency with statements of Virginia Governor. Statements of Virginia Governor indicate: 1) he authorized all forces under his command to help capitol before DoD, and 2) DoD only followed after dissemination of his mobilization.
- 3:37 p.m.: Maryland Governor Larry Hogan orders mobilization of Maryland National Guard forces in anticipation of a request for support.
- 3:39 p.m.: Arlington County, Virginia, acting police chief Andy Penn informs county officials that Arlington officers are responding to the attack and have been absorbed into the Capitol Police response.
- 3:46 p.m.: Chief of the National Guard Bureau Gen. Daniel R. Hokanson has a phone call with Virginia Adjutant General Timothy P. Williams to discuss support to Washington, D.C., and is informed that Virginia National Guard forces have already been mobilized.
- 3:48 p.m.: Army Secretary McCarthy leaves the Pentagon for Metro Police Department Headquarters in the Henry Daly Building.
- 3:55 p.m.: Gen. Hokanson has a phone call with Maryland Adjutant General Maj. Gen. Timothy E. Gowen to discuss support to Washington, D.C., and is informed that Maryland National Guard forces have already been mobilized.
- 4:08 p.m.: From a secure location, Vice President Pence phones Christopher Miller, the acting defense secretary, to confirm the Capitol is not secure and to ask military leaders for a deadline for securing the building while demanding that the Capitol be cleared.
- 4:10 p.m.: Army Secretary McCarthy arrives at D.C. Metropolitan Police Department Headquarters.
- 4:17 p.m.: Trump uploads a video to his Twitter calling for supporters to "go home". This was one of three takes, with the "most palatable option" chosen by White House aides for distribution.
- 4:18 p.m.: Secretary Miller, Gen. Milley, Army Secretary McCarthy, and Gen. Hokanson discuss availability of National Guard forces located outside of the immediate D.C. Metro area. Secretary Miller verbally authorizes mustering and deployment of out-of-State National Guard forces to D.C.

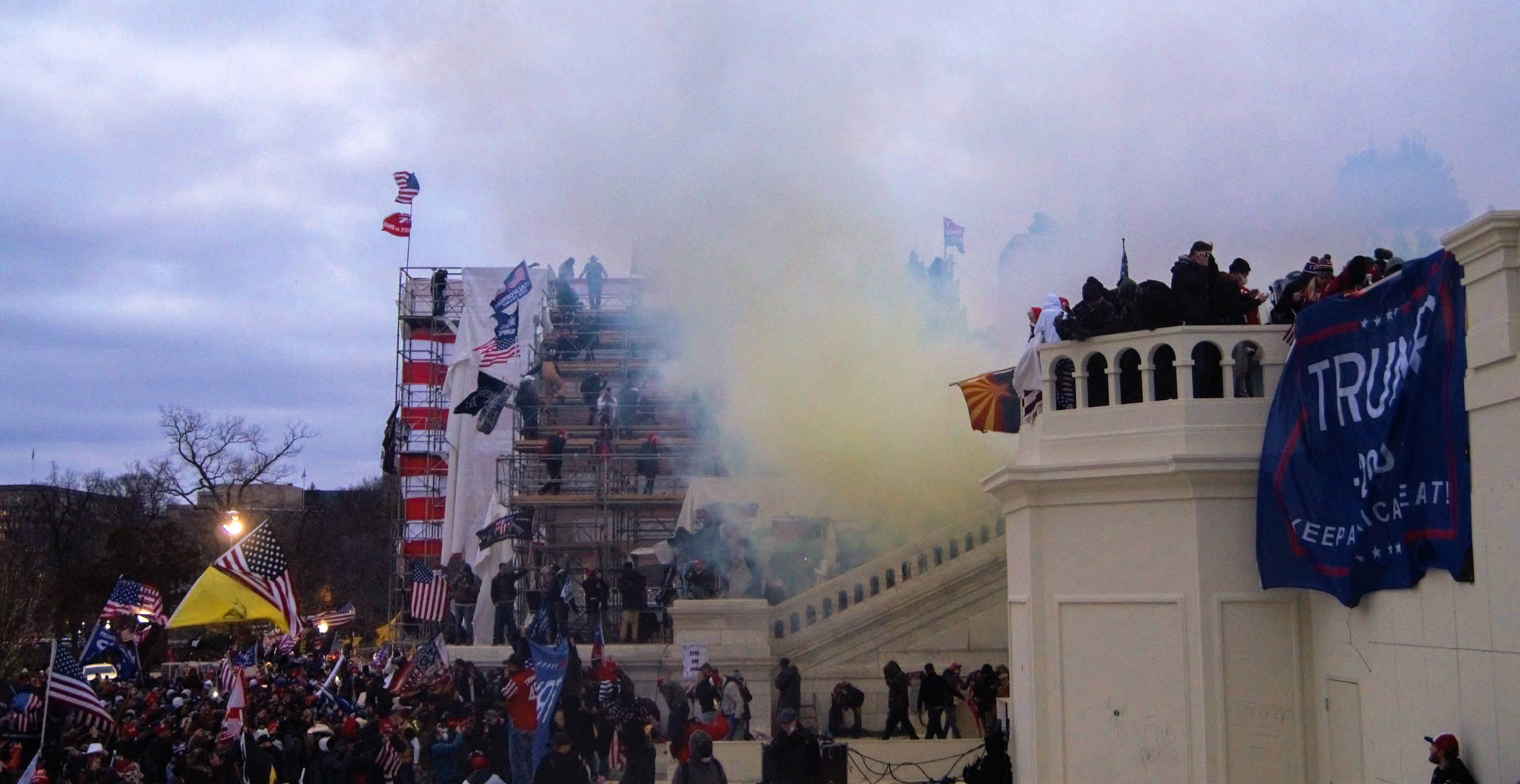
Tear gas on the west Capitol steps at 4:20 p.m.

- 4:32 p.m.: Secretary Miller authorizes DCNG to actually deploy in support of the U.S. Capitol Police.
- 4:40 p.m.: Army Secretary McCarthy has a phone call with Maryland Governor Hogan in which the Governor agrees to send Maryland NG forces to D.C., expected the next day.
- 5:08 p.m.: Army senior leaders relay to Major General Walker the Secretary of Defense's permission to deploy the DCNG to the Capitol.
- 5:20 p.m.: The first contingent of 155 Guard members, dressed in riot gear, begin arriving at the Capitol.
- 5:40 p.m.: 154 DCNG soldiers arrive at the Capitol Complex, swear in with the Capitol Police, and begin support operations, having departed the D.C. Armory at 5:02.
- 5:45 p.m.: Secretary Miller signs formal authorization for out-of-State National Guard to muster and deploy in support of U.S. Capitol Police.

=== Leaders and agencies involved ===
Legislative Branch
Michael C. Stenger	Sergeant-at-Arms of the Senate (Note: Stenger resigned after the attack.)	On January 3, Stenger was contacted by Capitol Police chief Sund, who requested National Guard in advance of January 6.
Paul D. Irving	Sergeant-at-Arms of the House (Note: Irving resigned after the attack.)	On January 3, Irving was contacted by Capitol Police chief Sund, who requested National Guard in advance of January 6. The request was denied by Irving who stated concerns about "optics".
Steven Sund	Chief of Capitol Police (Note: Sund resigned after the attack.)	On January 6, at 1:49 p.m., Sund contacted Gen. William J. Walker, commander of the D.C. National Guard, to request assistance, although Walker did not have the authority to approve the request.
Department of Defense
Christopher C. Miller	Secretary of Defense (acting) (Note: On November 9, 2019, Trump fired Defense Secretary Mark Esper, replacing him with Christopher C. Miller.)	On January 3, Miller was ordered by Trump to "do whatever was necessary to protect the demonstrators" on January 6. The following day, Miller issued orders which prohibited deploying D.C. Guard members with weapons, helmets, body armor or riot control agents without his personal approval. On January 6, Miller withheld permission to deploy the National Guard until 4:32 p.m., after assets from Virginia had already entered the District, a FBI SWAT team had arrived at the Capitol, and Trump had instructed rioters to "go home". Miller's permission would not actually be relayed to the Commander of the Guard until 5:08.
Ryan D. McCarthy	Secretary of the Army (Note: On June 21, 2019, Trump nominated McCarthy to become Secretary of the Army.)	On January 5, 2021, McCarthy issued a memo placing limits on the District of Columbia National Guard. On January 6, McCarthy participated in a 1:34 p.m. phone call in which Mayor Bowser requested National Guard deployment. At 2:22 p.m., McCarthy participated in a second call with Mayor Bowser and other D.C. officials.
Walter E. Piatt	Director of the Army Staff	Piatt participated in a 2:26 p.m. conference call in which Capitol Police Chief Sund requested Guards. Piatt announced he would not recommend approving the request, stating "I don't like the visual of the National Guard standing a police line with the Capitol in the background."
Charles A. Flynn	Deputy Chief of Staff for Army operations, plans and training (Note: On November 30, 2020, Flynn's nomination for promotion to general was submitted to the U.S. Senate; the nomination was confirmed by voice vote on December 20, 2020.)	On January 6, Flynn participated in the 2:26 p.m. conference call in which Gen. Piatt said he could not recommend Guard be deployed to the Capitol. After the attack, the Army initially denied Flynn had participated in the call. Charles Flynn's role drew scrutiny in light of his brother Michael's recent calls for martial law and a redo election overseen by the military.
Daniel Hokanson	Chief of the National Guard Bureau	On January 6, after having learned that the Virginia National Guard may have mobilized, at 3:46 p.m., Hokanson called the Virginia commander, Maj. Gen. Timothy P. Williams, to verify no Virginia military forces would move without prior permission from the Pentagon. At 3:55, Hokanson made a similar call to the commander of the Maryland National Guard.
William J. Walker	Commander of D.C. National Guard (Note: In March 2018, Trump nominated Walker for promotion to Major General and selected him as the Commanding General. In the wake of the attack, on April 26, 2021, Walker was appointed Sergeant at Arms of the House of Representatives.)	On January 1, Walker contacted Army Secretary McCarthy requesting permission to approve Mayor Bowser's request for Guard in D.C. On January 4, Walker was issued orders forbidding deployment of the D.C. National Guard without the personal approval of Sec. Miller. Walker later explained: "All military commanders normally have immediate response authority to protect property, life, and in my case, federal functions – federal property and life. But in this instance I did not have that authority." On January 6, Walker repeatedly sought permission to the deploy the Guard, though he did not receive that permission from Sec. Miller until 5:08, after Trump had released a video calling for his supporters to "go home".
Timothy P. Williams	Commander of Virginia National Guard	On January 6, after Gov. Northam mobilized the Virginia guard, at 3:46 Williams received a call from Gen. Hokanson to verify no Virginia military forces would move without prior permission from the Pentagon.
District of Columbia
Muriel Bowser	Mayor of D.C.	During a 1:34 phone call, Bowser requested Army Secretary Ryan D. McCarthy deploy Guard. In a second call at 2:22, Bowser and D.C. officials again requested DCNG support from Army Secretary McCarthy.
Robert Contee	Chief of D.C. police	In a call at 2:22, Contee warned Army Sec. McCarthy of an imminent breach of the capitol and reiterated the need for Guard.
Commonwealth of Virginia
Ralph Northam	Governor of Virginia	At 3:33, Northam ordered mobilization of Virginia National Guard.
Brian Moran	Virginia Secretary of Public Safety and Homeland Security	On January 6, after learning of the Pentagon's refusal to deploy Guard, at 2:26 Moran dispatched Virginia State Police to the Capitol.
Dave Rohrer	Fairfax County, Virginia, deputy county executive	On January 6, at 3:10 p.m., Rohrer announced the deployment of Fairfax officers to the Capitol.
Department of Justice
	FBI	By 4:24 p.m., a 12-man armed SWAT team had arrived at the Capitol Complex.
Department of Homeland Security
	Customs and Border Protection	Approximately 50 uniformed, armed personnel were staging in the Reagan Federal Building, which lies on Pennsylvania Avenue between the White House and the Capitol. They did not deploy until after Trump had told supporters to "go home".

== Criticism of law enforcement agencies ==
=== Capitol Police ===
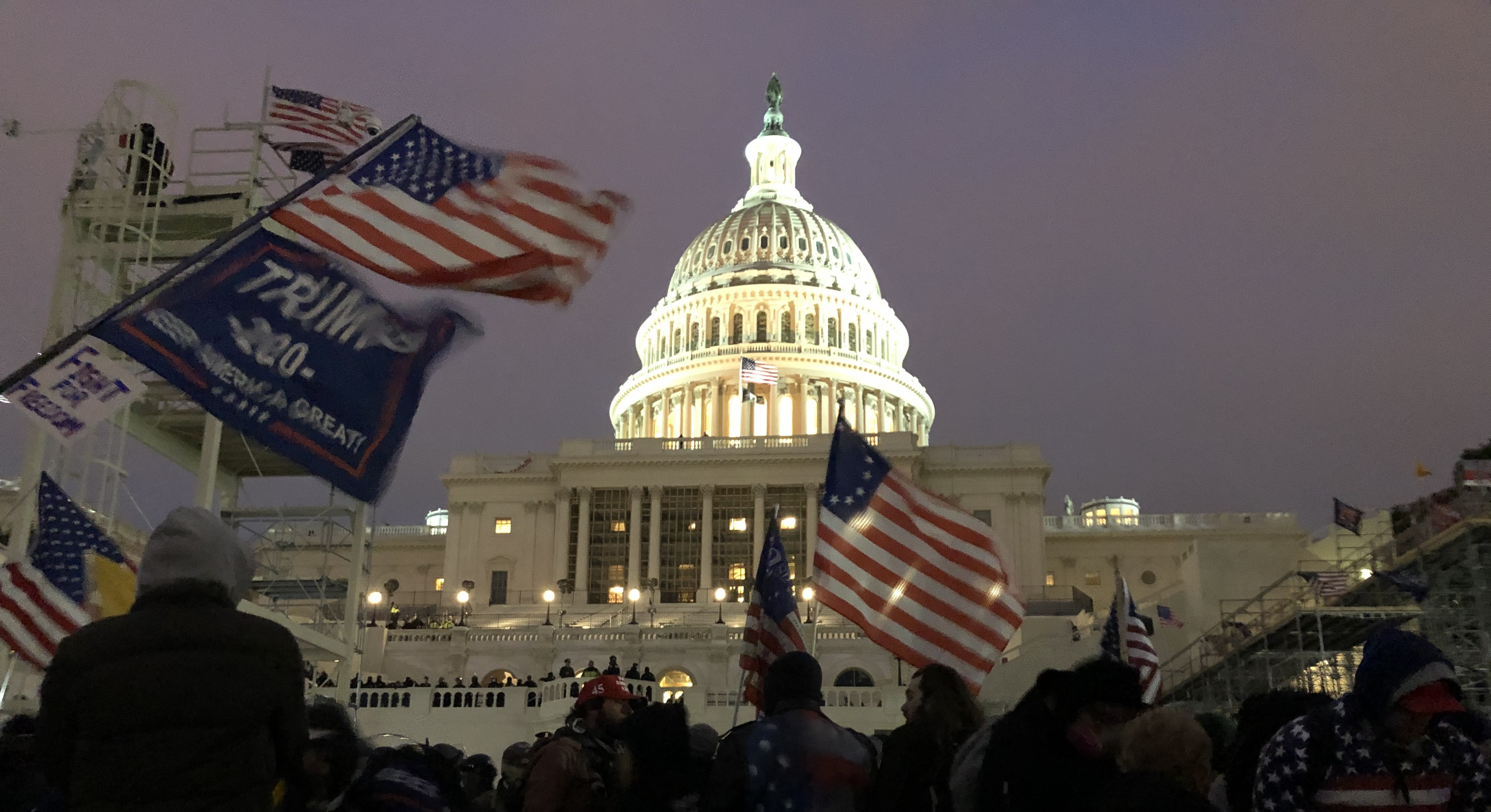
Pro-Trump protesters around the Capitol on the evening of January 6

Law enforcement's failure to prevent the mob from breaching the Capitol attracted scrutiny to the Capitol Police and other police agencies involved. The Capitol Police, which has jurisdiction over an area of around two square miles (5.2 km^{2}), is one of the largest and best-funded police forces in the United States, with around 2,000 officers, an annual budget of more than $460 million, access to a substantial arsenal, and extensive experience of responding to protests and high-profile events; it has more than tripled in size since 1996. Prior to the attack, the barriers erected were low and most officers were in regular uniforms rather than riot gear, aimed at managing a protest rather than deterring an attack. Policing experts criticized the Capitol Police's preparation and initial response, saying the agency had underestimated the potential threat from Trump supporters, unwisely allowed rioters to gather on the Capitol steps, and failed to immediately arrest the rioters, or otherwise respond to the disorder, after the forced entry.

The Washington Post reported that the Capitol Police were caught off guard by an overwhelming crowd whose size more than doubled the FBI's prediction and that the police lacked enough personnel to immediately detain all the intruders; the Post further noted that "some officers were captured on video appearing to stand back as rioters streamed inside." Some of the shortfall in staffing was attributable to the COVID-19 pandemic, with officers who were quarantined after being infected with or exposed to SARS-CoV-2, the virus that causes COVID-19. Police units were not asked by management to bring protective equipment (such as gas masks) that were issued to them, which left officers ill-prepared to fend off the rioters – among them, a "heavily trained group of militia terrorists" armed with bear spray and stun grenades and equipped with two-way radios and earpieces – and some having to resort to engaging in hand-to-hand combat to defend themselves.

Representative Zoe Lofgren (D-CA), who chairs a committee responsible for Capitol security, said Capitol Police chief Steven Sund lied to her before the event about the preparations he had made and the readiness of the National Guard. Representative Maxine Waters said she had raised concerns with Sund on December 31, and was assured by him that "he had it under control". These statements were refuted by Sund in an 8-page letter he penned to Pelosi a few weeks later, stating "I did not at any time misrepresent any facts.. it was an accurate representation of our intelligence and threat assessment."

Tim Ryan, Chairman of the House Appropriations Subcommittee on the Legislative Branch (which has budgetary authority over the Capitol Police), announced that he would begin an inquiry into security lapses that allowed the violent mob to overrun the Capitol and breach the legislative chambers. Ryan indicated that he expected some officers in the Capitol Police to be fired, and cited a "lack of professional planning and dealing" and "strategic mistakes" ahead of "the insurrection and the attempted coup". Representative Anthony Brown (D–MD) called for the establishment of a civilian oversight board for the Capitol Police. On the January 7 edition of MSNBC's Morning Joe, host Joe Scarborough excoriated the Capitol Police response and accused some officers of enabling the rioters to successfully breach the building with little resistance.

Politico reported some rioters briefly showing their police badges or military identification to law enforcement as they approached the Capitol, expecting therefore to be let inside; a Capitol Police officer told BuzzFeed News that one rioter told him "[w]e're doing this for you" as he flashed a badge. Ed Davis, the former commissioner of the Boston Police Department, suggested Capitol Police leaders may have felt "that well, these are a bunch of conservatives, they're not going to do anything like [the ensuing riot]", leading to "a lack of urgency or a sense that this could never happen with this crowd".

In a February 2021 confidence vote organized by the U.S. Capitol Police Labor Committee, the union representing Capitol Police officers, 92 percent voted that they had no confidence in Acting Chief Yogananda Pittman.

The first public hearing on the security failures was held before the Senate on February 23, 2021.

==== Accusations of member involvement in riot ====
Footage emerged on social media of police allowing rioters through barricades into the Capitol, and one officer was filmed taking a "selfie" with a rioter inside the building. Footage also showed two Capitol Police officers exchanging a handshake and an elbow bump with a rioter inside the Capitol. Representative Jim Cooper (D–TN) was concerned that Capitol Police could have been complicit in the breach, saying "At worst, [Capitol Police] let this protest proceed unlike any other". One participant in the riot said he and his friends had been given directions to the office of Senate Minority Leader Chuck Schumer by a Capitol Police officer. Representative Pramila Jayapal (D–WA) said she believed the rioters were aided in planning, and guided once inside the Capitol, by Capitol Police officers. Multiple European security officials, including two intelligence officials from NATO member countries, in interviews with Business Insider suggested the breach may have been abetted by "tacit support" of the attackers among members of Capitol Police and other federal agencies assisting with Capitol complex security.

=== National Guard ===
In a letter to acting U.S. Defense Secretary Christopher C. Miller on January 11, Senators Chris Murphy (D-CT), Martin Heinrich (D-NM) and Kirsten Gillibrand (D-NY) described the speed with which the D.C. National Guard responded to the riot as "totally inadequate", said "serious questions must be answered regarding the ... readiness of our Armed Forces and federal agencies" to respond to similar events, and called on Miller to explain how the Department of Defense could ensure a "significantly faster" deployment in the event of future emergencies at the Capitol. Testifying before Congress in March 2021, commanding officer of the D.C. National Guard William Walker stated his superiors did not grant him authorization to deploy forces for more than three hours after he had sought it upon the "frantic" request of Capitol Police chief Sund. Walker testified that his superiors expressed concerns about the "optics" of a deployment, noting they had not expressed similar concerns about the quick and aggressive deployment during the George Floyd protests months earlier.

Chairman of the Joint Chiefs of Staff Mark Milley told the House committee investigating January 6 that Pence, not Trump, had ordered the deployment of the National Guard. Milley revealed that White House chief of staff Mark Meadows had told him, essentially, that Pence was in charge of this, but that it was a secret. "We have to kill the narrative that the vice president is making all the decisions. We need to establish the narrative, you know, that the President is still in charge and that things are steady or stable," Milley said, echoing what he remembered Meadows telling him. He clarified that Meadows had said either this "or words to that effect."

=== Accusations of differential treatment ===
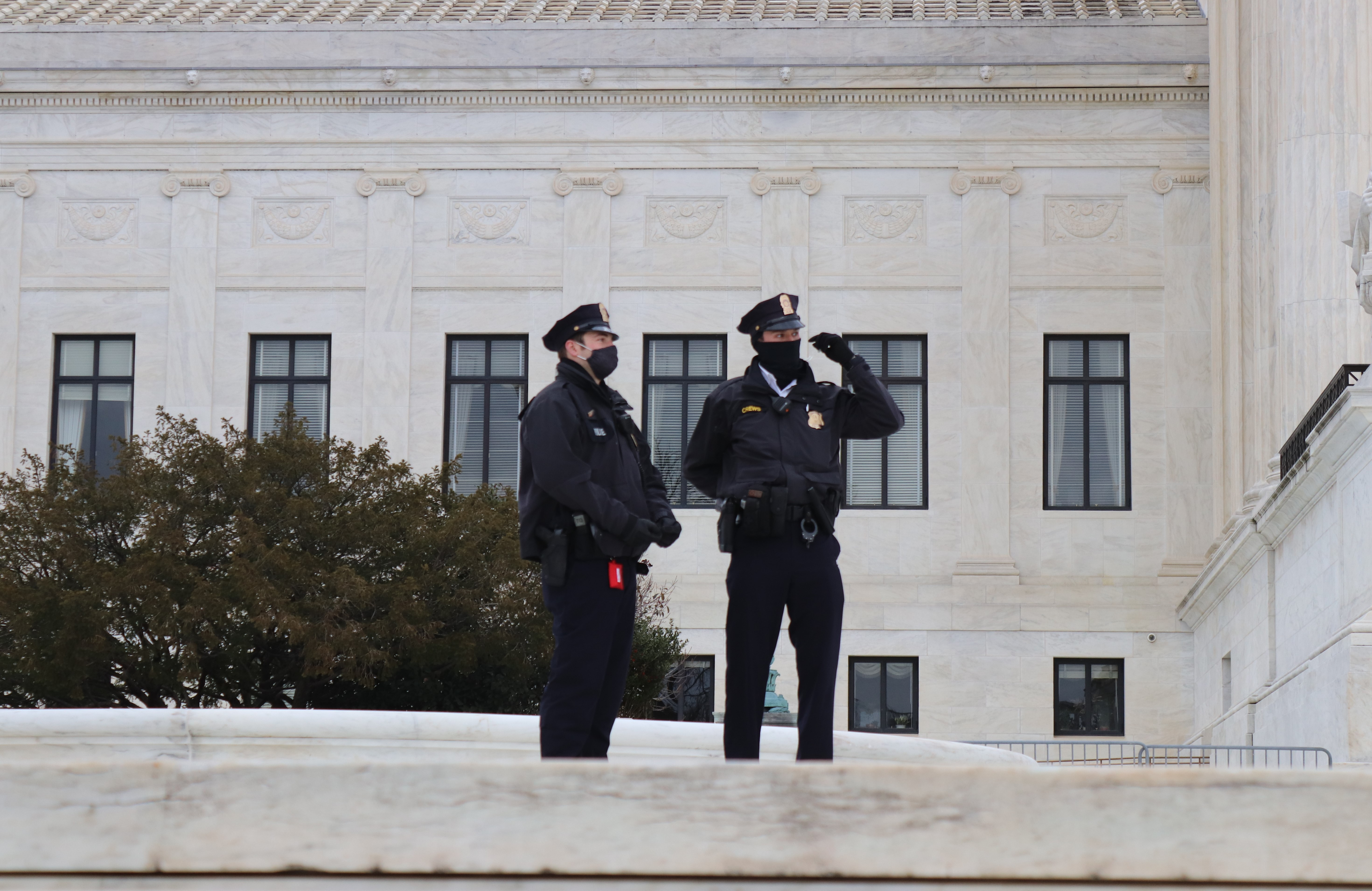
US Supreme Court Police officers before the attack

News outlets fact-checked and described harsher tactics and differential treatment of racial injustice protests in D.C. during the prior summer by law enforcement compared to those used against the Capitol rioters, although admittedly with missing context. According to CNN, police had arrested 61 people on the day of the attack; eclipsing all but one day of protests the previous summer, where 316 Black Lives Matter protesters were arrested on June 1, 2020. Rioters who were arrested after the attack tended to be charged with less serious crimes than those arrested in racial injustice protests.

The tone, vocabulary, and tactics used by Trump and the White House were highlighted by news outlets. Trump referred to racial injustice protesters as "thugs", "agitators", and "looters" and threatened violence, but expressed his "love" for the Capitol rioters. In 2020, Trump had encouraged states' governors to more aggressively target protesters and used violent rhetoric such as "when the looting starts, the shooting starts". News outlets noted how the White House had used forceful tactics to clear protesters for Trump's photo op at St. John's Episcopal Church but did not employ similar tactics during the Capitol riot. Similarly, Capitol Police responded aggressively to disabled protesters associated with ADAPT in 2017. During 2020, Trump ordered tough federal law enforcement responses to racial injustice protesters in Washington D.C.

Multiple media outlets covered posts from users on social media which made claims that due to white privilege and male privilege, the police treated the protesters, who were mostly white men, with more leniency than they would people of color, with many citing a moment when a police officer took a selfie with a protester.

Many news outlets, including CNN, USA Today, The Guardian, The Washington Post, and CBS News, criticized the police response to the attack in contrast to the police response to the Black Lives Matter protests in the previous year. In June 2020, during Black Lives Matter demonstrations, 5,000 National Guard members guarded the White House; however, in an attempt to avoid inflaming tensions since those protests, Mayor Muriel Bowser opted not to call National Guard members from other states for the January 6 demonstrations, causing the law enforcement presence to be "relatively small" and "not prepared for rioters".

Politicians and officials commented on the differential treatment as well. Joe Biden said, "No one can tell me that if it had been a group of Black Lives Matter protesting yesterday, there wouldn't have been – they would have been treated very, very differently than the mob of thugs that stormed the Capitol". Representative Tim Ryan, former First Lady Michelle Obama, and D.C. Attorney General Karl Racine all noted the differential treatment. Representative Bennie Thompson (D–MS), the chair of the House Committee on Homeland Security, said "if the 'protesters' were Black they would have been shot with rubber bullets, tear gassed, and killed". Citing disparities in the use of force when compared to recent Black Lives Matter protests, first-year Representative Jamaal Bowman (D–NY) proposed legislation to investigate whether members of the Capitol Police have ties to white supremacist groups.

=== Investigations ===
On January 8, the Senate Rules and Administration Committee and Homeland Security and Governmental Affairs Committee launched a joint investigation into the Capitol Police's security failures. The law enforcement failures that allowed the attack led the U.S. Secret Service to initiate a review of its security plans for the inauguration of Joe Biden on January 20, 2021.

On January 11, Representative Tim Ryan disclosed that two Capitol police officers had been suspended and at least ten were under investigation following the events of the riot. In February 2021, the number was updated to thirty-five officers that were under investigation; six officers who were suspended with pay, and twenty-nine that were still working.

In September, Capitol Police said that its Office of Professional Responsibility had started 38 internal investigations, as a result of which it has recommended disciplinary action against six members of the force for their conduct during the attack; no criminal charges were announced.

=== Resignations ===
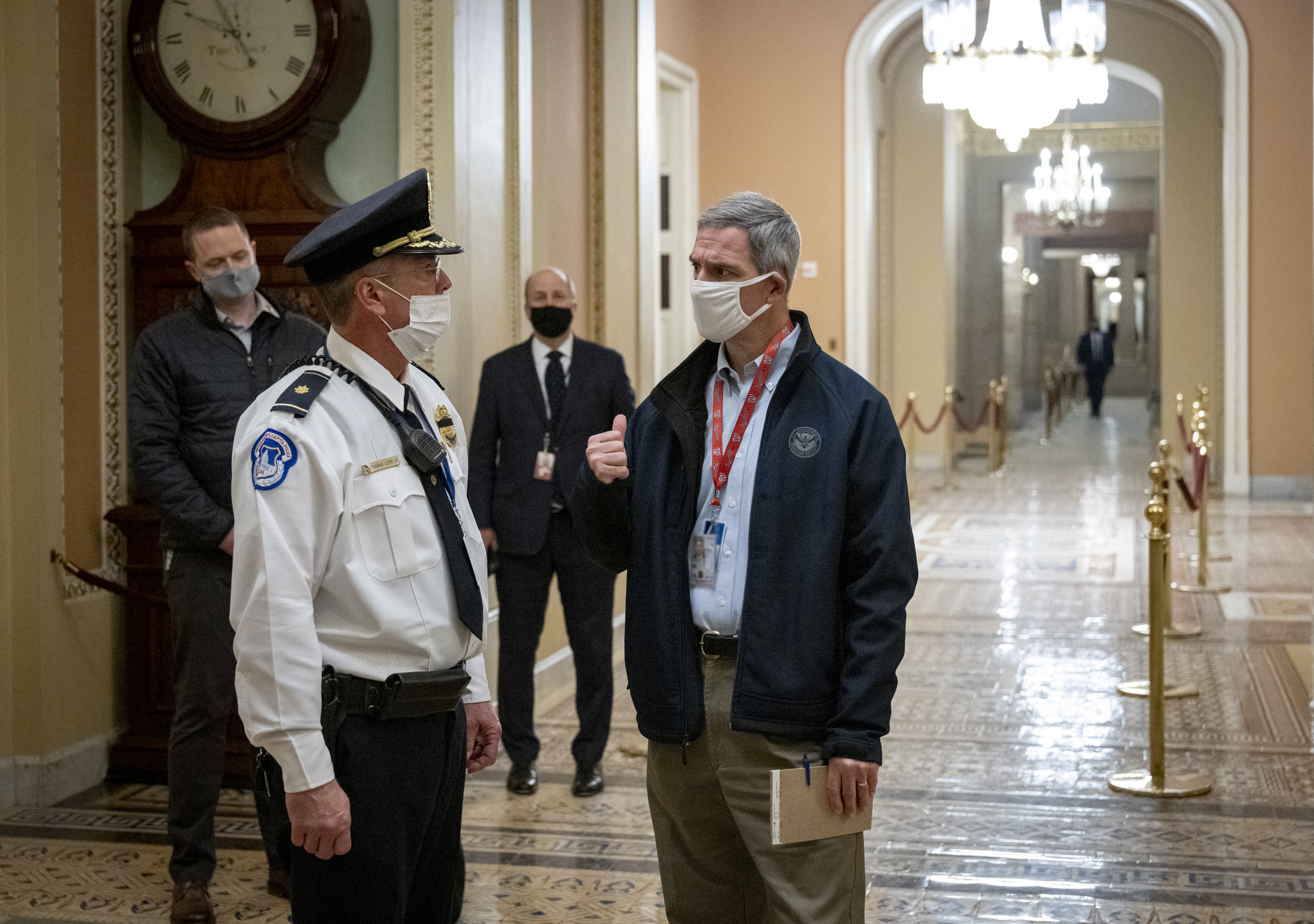
Ken Cuccinelli, acting Deputy Secretary of Homeland Security, touring the Capitol after the attack to survey damage

The day after the attack, Pelosi called upon Capitol Police chief Steven Sund to resign, citing a failure of leadership, and said she had been unable to reach Sund since the attack. Although Sund felt the decision was uninformed and premature, he submitted his resignation that afternoon, which was effective on January 16, 2021. An aide to speaker Pelosi later clarified that Pelosi had indeed spoken with Sund on the evening of January 6, but not after that time. That day, Sund wrote to the Capitol Police Board saying he would resign effective January 16, but on the next day, January 8, Sund resigned with immediate effect. Yogananda D. Pittman became acting chief.

Also on the day after the attack, Paul D. Irving announced his resignation as Sergeant-at-Arms of the House of Representatives. Chuck Schumer said he would fire Michael C. Stenger, Sergeant-at-Arms of the Senate, upon becoming majority leader later in January. Shortly thereafter, outgoing Majority Leader Mitch McConnell asked for and received Stenger's resignation, effective immediately.

=== Changes in response to criticism ===
Based on the recommendations of several critical reports, Capitol Police was reported in July to be working to "pivot towards an intelligence-based protective agency". The force opened regional offices in California and Florida to investigate threats to members of Congress. A "critical incident response plan" was developed with an aim to "quickly mobilize ... manpower, including the Department of Defense, to respond to planned and/or no-notice emergencies". Other adjustments such as boosting surveillance, protection, and staffing were also announced.

In December 2021, Congress passed the Capitol Police Emergency Assistance Act of 2021, enabling the chief of the U.S. Capitol Police to request from the National Guard federal law enforcement agencies without the approval of the Capitol Police Board. Prior to this, these requests had to be made by the Capitol Police Board.
