= Jennifer Hemingway =

American law enforcement officer

Jennifer A. Hemingway
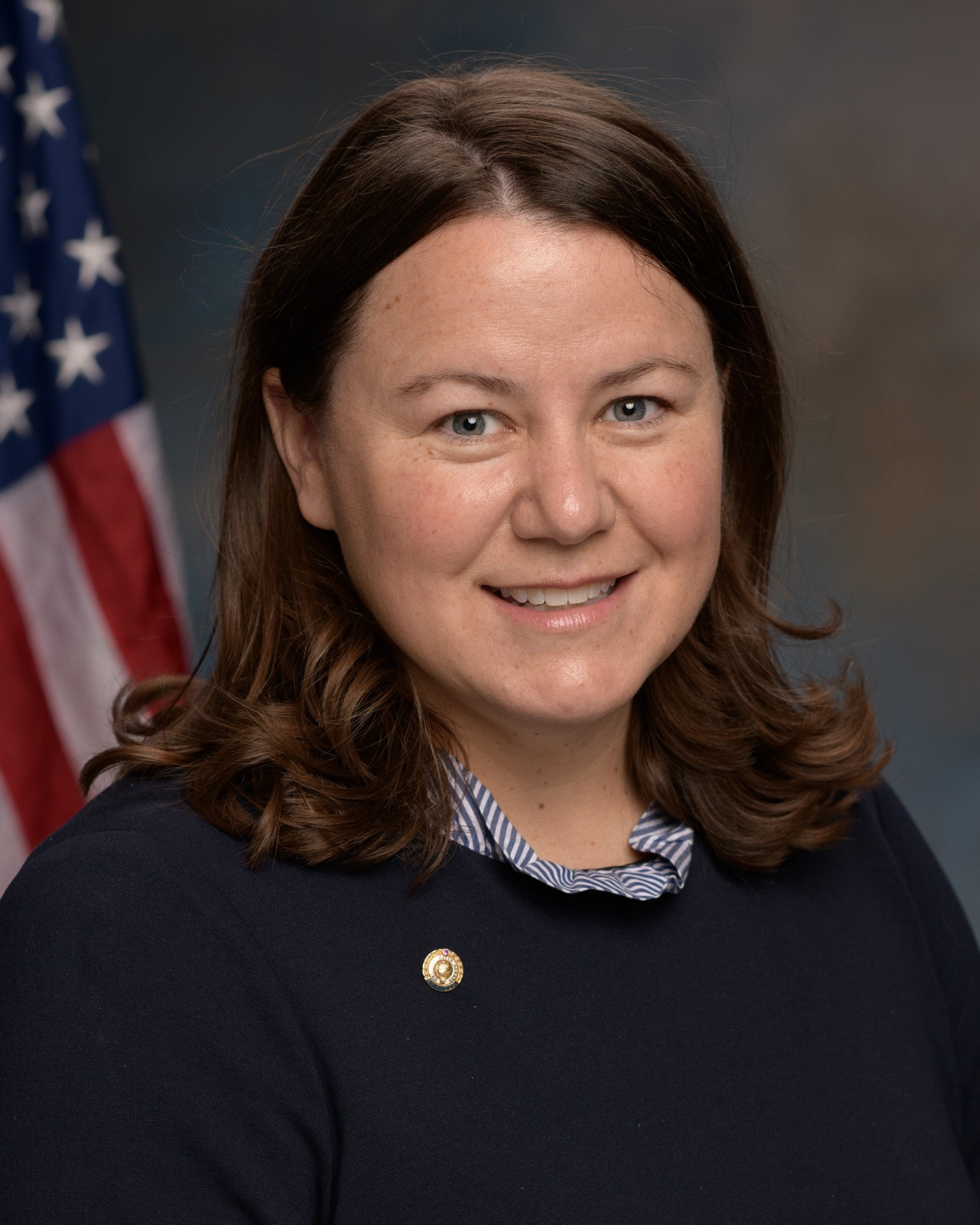

Sergeant at Arms of the United States Senate
- Incumbent
- Assumed office January 3, 2025
- Leader: John Thune
- Preceded by: Karen Gibson
- Acting; January 7, 2021 – March 22, 2021
- Deputy: Eugene Goodman (acting)
- Leader: Mitch McConnell; Chuck Schumer
- Preceded by: Michael C. Stenger
- Succeeded by: Karen Gibson

Personal details
- Education: University of Florida (BA, BS); George Washington University (MPA)

Jennifer A. Hemingway is an American federal law enforcement officer serving as the sergeant at arms of the United States Senate. Prior to her appointment at the 119th United States Congress she served as a political advisor and briefly served as the acting sergeant at arms of the United States Senate. She also served as acting chairwoman of the Capitol Police Board in 2021.

== Education ==
Hemingway earned a Bachelor of Arts in political science and Bachelor of Science in economics from the University of Florida, followed by a Master of Public Administration in budget and public finance from George Washington University.

== Career ==
In 1999, Hemingway became the deputy staff director of the United States House Committee on Oversight and Reform. In 2001 and 2002, she was the associate director of public affairs at the United States Department of Transportation. She was the director of legislative and regulatory affairs at the Blue Cross Blue Shield Association before becoming a staffer of the United States Senate Committee on Homeland Security and Governmental Affairs. After eight years with the Homeland Security Committee, Hemingway worked as the treasurer of the District of Columbia Library Association and president of the Junior League of Washington. She returned to the United States House Committee on Oversight and Reform in 2015. In 2017 and 2018, she was the director of operations for then-speaker Paul Ryan. Hemingway was selected to serve as the deputy sergeant at arms of the United States Senate in December 2018.

=== Sergeant at Arms of the United States Senate ===
On January 7, 2021, Hemingway was named by Senate majority leader Mitch McConnell as acting Senate Sergeant at Arms, following the resignation of Michael C. Stenger after the 2021 storming of the United States Capitol. House sergeant-at-arms Paul D. Irving and United States Capitol Police chief Steven Sund also resigned the same day, amid bipartisan shock and outrage over security lapses that led to the mob's breach and occupation of the Capitol. She held the post until General Karen Gibson was confirmed as the new Senate Sergeant at Arms.

Hemingway was re-instituted as the Senate Sergeant at Arms by Senator John Thune at the beginning of the 119th Congress.

Government offices
Preceded by Karen Gibson	43rd Sergeant at Arms of the United States Senate; 2021 – 2025	Incumbent
