= Karen Gibson (Sergeant at Arms) =

American federal law enforcement officer

Karen H. Gibson
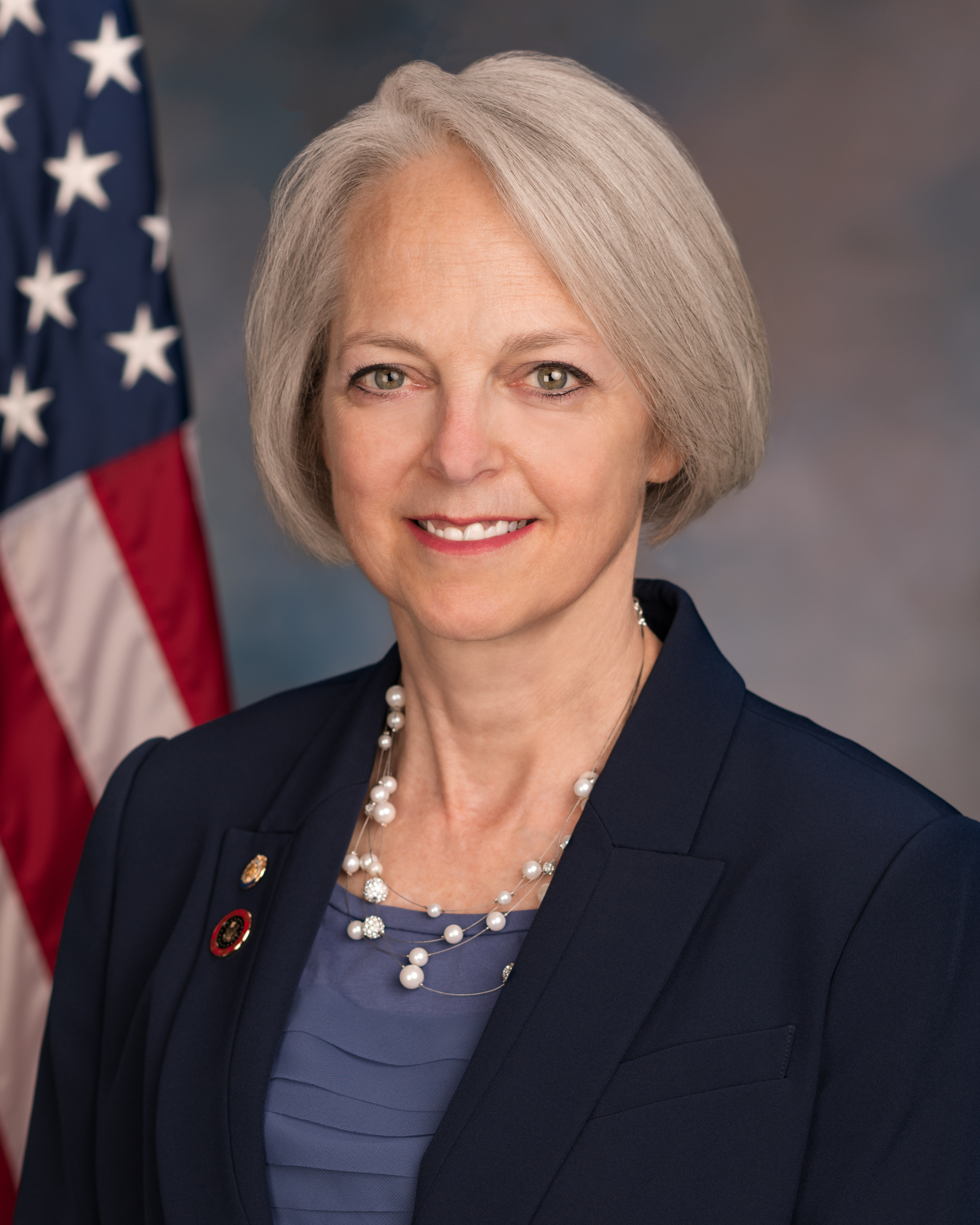

42nd Sergeant at Arms of the United States Senate
- In office March 22, 2021 – January 3, 2025
- Deputy: Kelly Fado
- Leader: Chuck Schumer
- Preceded by: Michael C. Stenger
- Succeeded by: Jennifer Hemingway

Director of Intelligence of the United States Central Command
- In office 2017–2019
- Leader: Joseph Votel
- Succeeded by: Dimitri Henry

Director of Intelligence of Combined Joint Task Force – Operation Inherent Resolve
- In office 2016–2017
- Leader: Stephen J. Townsend
- Preceded by: Jeffrey A. Kruse
- Succeeded by: Leah Lauderback

Deputy Commanding General of Joint Force Headquarters–Cyber of the United States Army Cyber Command
- In office 2014–2016
- Leader: Edward C. Cardon
- Succeeded by: Maria Barrett

Personal details
- Education: Purdue University (BS); National War College (MS); National Intelligence University (MS)

Military service
- Allegiance: United States
- Branch/service: United States Army
- Years of service: 1987–2020
- Rank: Lieutenant General
- Unit: Office of the Director of National Intelligence; Combined Joint Task Force; United States Army Cyber Command

Karen H. Gibson is a retired military intelligence officer and former Sergeant at Arms of the United States Senate

== Early life and education ==
Gibson was raised in Bozeman, Montana, where she graduated from Bozeman High School. Gibson earned a Bachelor of Science degree in industrial engineering from Purdue University, a Master of Science in national security strategy from the National War College, and a Master of Science in strategic intelligence from the National Intelligence University.

== Career ==
Gibson served in the United States Army for 33 years, retiring with the rank of Lieutenant General. Prior to her appointment as sergeant at arms, Gibson served as the deputy Director of National Intelligence for national security partnerships, director of intelligence for United States Central Command, director of intelligence for the Combined Joint Task Force, and deputy commanding general for the United States Army Cyber Command.

A seasoned combat veteran, Gibson led intelligence-operations fusion centers in Iraq, Afghanistan, Korea, East Africa, and in the United States.

Senate Majority Leader Chuck Schumer announced the appointment of Gibson as sergeant at arms of the United States Senate in March 2021. She had recently worked with Russel L. Honoré to make recommendations for Congress in the wake of the 2021 storming of the United States Capitol. Gibson is the second woman to serve as the Senate Sergeant at Arms. Gibson, her deputy, Kelly Fado, and Chief of Staff, Jennifer Hemingway, are the first all-female team occupying the Senate's top three security posts.

Military offices
Preceded by ???	Deputy Commanding General of Joint Force Headquarters–Cyber of the United States Army Cyber Command; 2014–2016	Succeeded by Maria Barrett
Preceded by Jeffrey A. Kruse	Director of Intelligence of Combined Joint Task Force – Operation Inherent Resolve; 2016–2017	Succeeded by Leah G. Lauderback
Preceded by ???	Director of Intelligence of the United States Central Command; 2017–2019	Succeeded by Dimitri Henry
Government offices
Preceded by Michael C. Stenger	42nd Sergeant at Arms of the United States Senate; 2021 – 2025	Succeeded by Jennifer Hemingway
