= Terrance Gainer =

Sergeant at Arms of the U.S. Senate

Terrance W. Gainer
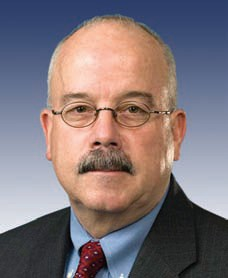
- Terry Gainer
- Born: August 1, 1947 (age 79); Evergreen Park, Illinois, U.S.
- Police career
- Department: Chicago Police Department; Illinois State Police; United States Capitol Police
- Service years: Chicago Police Department: 1968–1987; Illinois State Police: 1987, 1991–1998; United States Capitol Police: 2002–2006
- Rank: Sergeant at Arms of the United States Senate

Terrance William Gainer (born August 1, 1947) is a former law enforcement officer and was the 38th Sergeant at Arms of the United States Senate and served in that position from January 4, 2007, to May 2, 2014.

Before Gainer continued his law enforcement career in Washington, D.C., he was the Republican candidate for Cook County State's Attorney in the 1988 election, losing to then-incumbent Richard M. Daley.

== Life and career ==
Born in 1947 in Evergreen Park, Illinois, Gainer graduated from St. Benedict's College (now Benedictine College) in 1969 with a Bachelor of Arts in Sociology, and he went on to obtain a Master of Science in management and public service and Juris Doctor (J.D.) degree from DePaul University. Gainer is a decorated veteran who served in the Vietnam War, and he served as a captain in the United States Navy Reserve until 2000.

He was a lead figure in the 1997 Roby standoff.

During his law enforcement career, Gainer served with the Chicago Police Department as deputy Inspector General of Illinois, deputy director of the Illinois State Police and in the United States Department of Transportation before he was appointed as director of the Illinois State Police in the Cabinet of Governor Jim Edgar in March 1991. Gainer went on to serve as executive assistant police chief, as second in command of the Metropolitan Police Department of the District of Columbia under Chief Charles H. Ramsey, beginning in March 1998 and as chief of the United States Capitol Police from June 2, 2002, to March 3, 2006. In addition, Gainer served as the Director of Emergency Preparedness for The Nonprofit Roundtable of Greater Washington. During his time with the Nonprofit Roundtable of Greater Washington, Gainer worked extensively with non-profit organizations (such as hospitals, schools and charities) to help them formulate a coordinated response for emergency preparedness in the Washington, DC metropolitan region.

On November 14, 2006, Gainer was appointed by Senate Majority Leader Harry Reid (D-NV) as the Sergeant at Arms of the United States Senate beginning with the 110th United States Congress.

During his time as Sergeant at Arms, Gainer proposed a security fence called the Capitol Gateway be built around the perimeter of the United States Capitol, similar to the fence around the White House. The plan was rejected for cost reasons. After the 2021 storming of the United States Capitol by supporters of President Donald Trump, a temporary fence was erected where the Capitol Gateway would have been erected to deter further attacks.

In March, 2014, Senate Majority Leader Harry Reid announced that Gainer planned on retiring as Senate Sergeant at Arms, and would be replaced by Senate Deputy Sergeant at Arms Andrew Willison. Willison was made the new sergeant at arms and doorkeeper of the Senate on May 5, 2014.

Political offices
Preceded by William Pickle	38th Sergeant at Arms of the United States Senate; 2007–2014	Succeeded by Andrew Willison
