= Frank J. Larkin =

Former Sergeant at Arms of the US Senate (born 1955)

Frank Larkin
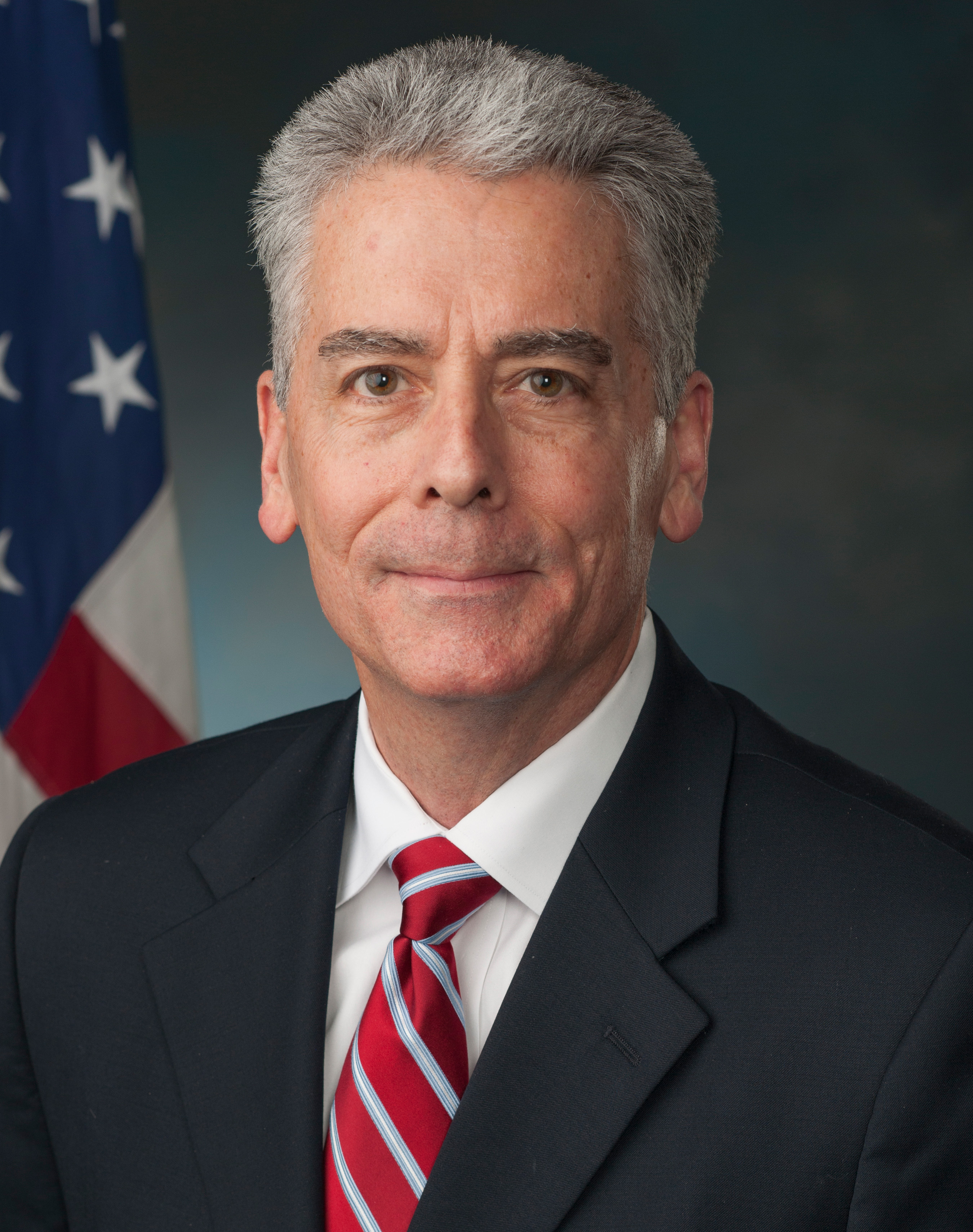

40th Sergeant at Arms of the United States Senate
- In office January 6, 2015 – April 15, 2018
- Leader: Mitch McConnell
- Preceded by: Andrew Willison
- Succeeded by: Michael C. Stenger

Personal details
- Born: Francis J. Larkin III; May 9, 1955 (age 71) Philadelphia, Pennsylvania, U.S.
- Education: Villanova University (BA, MPA)

Military service
- Allegiance: United States
- Branch/service: United States Navy
- Years of service: 1973–1981
- Unit: Navy SEALs

Francis J. Larkin III (born May 9, 1955) served as the 40th Sergeant at Arms of the United States Senate after his nomination by Senate Majority Leader Mitch McConnell on January 6, 2015, succeeding Andrew Willison. Larkin assumed his post as Sergeant at Arms after a distinguished career in both the public and private sector, including work in law enforcement, national security, information technology and cyber security. McConnell nominated Michael C. Stenger to succeed Larkin on April 16, 2018.

Larkin previously served in several posts at the United States Department of Defense and in law enforcement. Prior to assuming office, he served in the United States Navy completing Basic Underwater Demolition/SEAL (BUD/S) training class 84 in 1975. Larkin is entitled to wear the SEAL Trident. Larkin served as a Navy SEAL from 1975 to 1981. Larkin subsequently was a uniformed police officer with the Norristown, Pennsylvania Police Department, a homicide detective with the Montgomery County, Pennsylvania District Attorney's Office, and as a Maryland State Police Trooper as a peace officer-Flight Paramedic. Larkin joined the United States Secret Service (USSS) in 1984 as a Special Agent assigned to the Philadelphia Field Office. Larkin was subsequently transferred to Washington, D.C., where he held positions in the Office of Training, the Washington Field Office and the Presidential Protective Division. Larkin retired from the Secret Service in 2006.

Larkin has a Bachelor of Arts degree in Criminal Justice and a Master of Public Administration degree from Villanova University.

After the suicide of his veteran son, Ryan, Larkin started a campaign to address the underlying reasons some veterans commit suicide, hinged on brain injuries sustained from being around explosive charges, and was featured on 60 Minutes in 2025.

== Citations ==
- Senate Sergeant-at-Arms Larkin on His 9/11 Heroics (Roll Call article)
- McConnell’s Sergeant-at-Arms Team’s Time Together Goes Way Back (Audio) (Roll Call article)

Government offices
Preceded by Andrew Willison	40th Sergeant at Arms of the United States Senate; 2015–2018	Succeeded by Michael C. Stenger
