= Andrew Willison =

Sergeant at Arms of the U.S. Senate

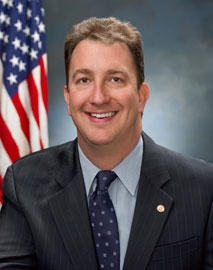

39th Sergeant at Arms and Doorkeeper of the United States Senate
- In office May 5, 2014 – January 5, 2015
- Leader: Harry Reid
- Preceded by: Terrance W. Gainer
- Succeeded by: Frank J. Larkin

Personal details
- Born: Andrew Baker Willison; October 4, 1965 (age 61) Mount Vernon, Ohio, U.S.
- Education: College of William & Mary; Ohio State University; George Washington University

Andrew Baker "Drew" Willison (born October 4, 1965) was the 39th sergeant at arms of the United States Senate from May 5, 2014, until January 5, 2015. Originally from the central Ohio area, Willison graduated from Greensville County High School in Emporia, Virginia, and attended the College of William & Mary, receiving his undergraduate degree in government. Willison went on to receive his master's degree in public administration from Ohio State University. Willison also has a law degree from the George Washington University Law School.

Political offices
Preceded by Terrance Gainer	39th Sergeant at Arms of the United States Senate; 2014–2015	Succeeded by Frank J. Larkin
