= Yogananda Pittman =

American police officer

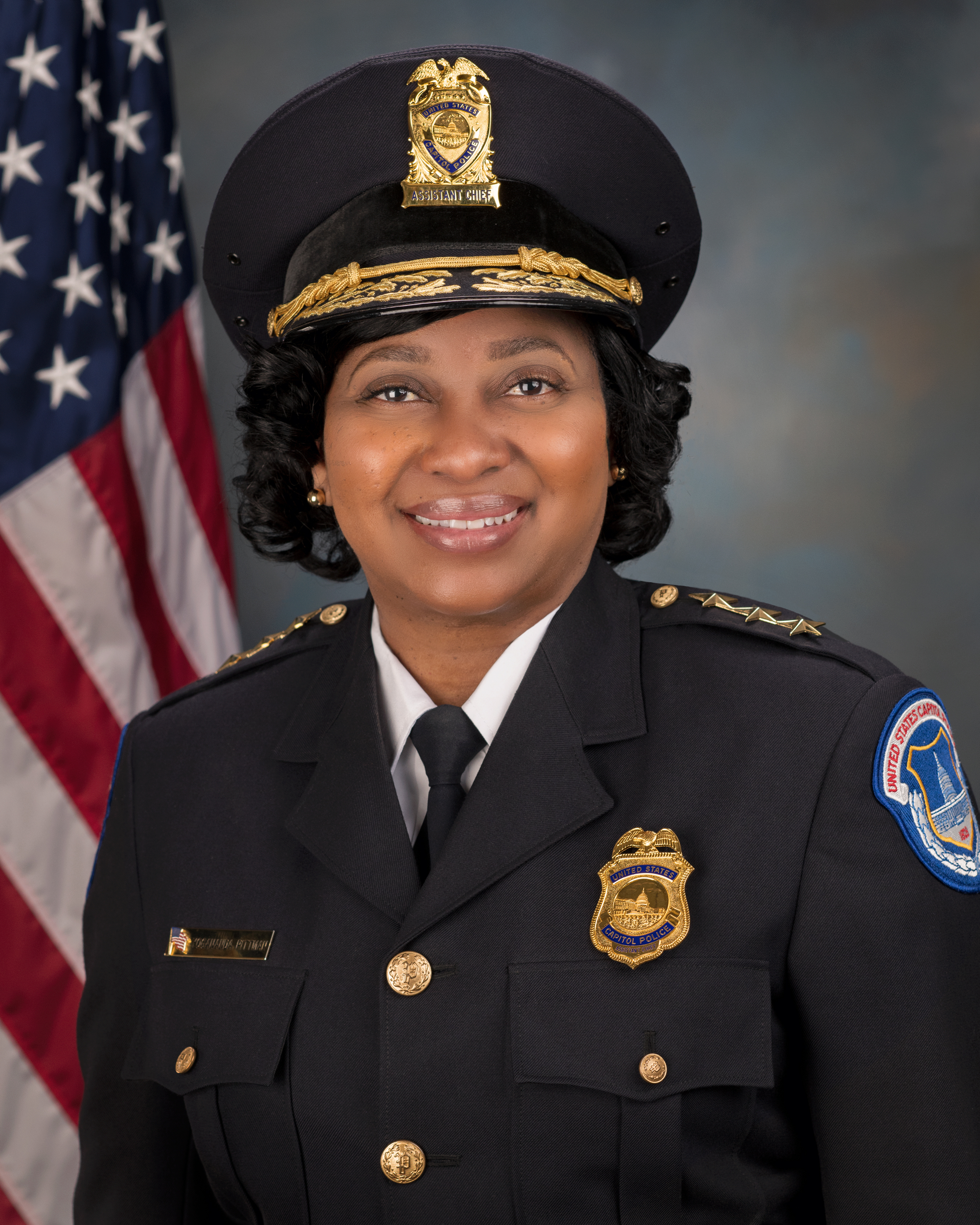
- Pittman c. 2021

Acting Chief of the United States Capitol Police
- In office January 8, 2021 – July 22, 2021
- Preceded by: Steven Sund
- Succeeded by: J. Thomas Manger

Personal details
- Born: c. 1980 (age c. 45
- Education: Morgan State University (BS); Marist College (MPA)

Yogananda D. Pittman (born c. 1980) is an American police officer who is the University of California, Berkeley chief of police. She was formerly the assistant chief and acting chief of the United States Capitol Police (USCP), serving in those posts during and after the January 6 United States Capitol attack.

She served as acting chief of the USCP from January 8 to July 23, 2021, following the resignation of Steven Sund. Her term as acting chief ended at the time of the appointment of J. Thomas Manger.

== Early life ==
Pittman earned a Bachelor of Science degree in psychology from Morgan State University in 1999. She later earned a Master of Public Administration from Marist College and is studying towards a Doctor of Public Administration at West Chester University.

== Career ==
She joined the Capitol Police in 2001. In 2012, Pittman was among the first black female supervisors to be promoted to the rank of captain in the Capitol Police. At that time, she was responsible for over 400 officers and civilian staff. The next year, she was in charge of the security planning for the second inauguration of Barack Obama. During her tenure, Pittman was assigned to the United States Senate Division and served as assistant chief of police for protective and intelligence operations. In 2020, Pittman received the Women in Federal Law Enforcement's Outstanding Advocate for Women award.

According to Steven Sund and Tarik Johnson, formerly of the U.S. Capitol Police, while Pittman was the interim Head of the U.S. Capitol Police, she had specific intelligence that there was a planned protest at the Capitol at least two weeks before the January 6, 2021 incident. According to findings in a bipartisan Senate investigation, a series of omissions and miscommunications kept that information from reaching front-line officers.

Following the resignation of Steven Sund in 2021, Pittman became acting chief of the Capitol Police. She was the first woman and first African American to lead the Capitol Police. On February 15, 2021, the U.S. Capitol Police Labor Committee, the union representing Capitol Police officers, voted 92% against Pittman in a vote of no confidence in her leadership.

On December 5, 2022, the University of California, Berkeley, announced that Pittman had assumed the role of chief of the Berkeley department of the UCPD, with her leadership beginning February 1, 2023.
