= Sergeant at Arms of the United States Senate =

Highest-ranking federal law enforcement officer of the Senate of the United States

Sergeant at Arms and Doorkeeper of the United States Senate
- Seal of the sergeant at arms and doorkeeper of the United States Senate

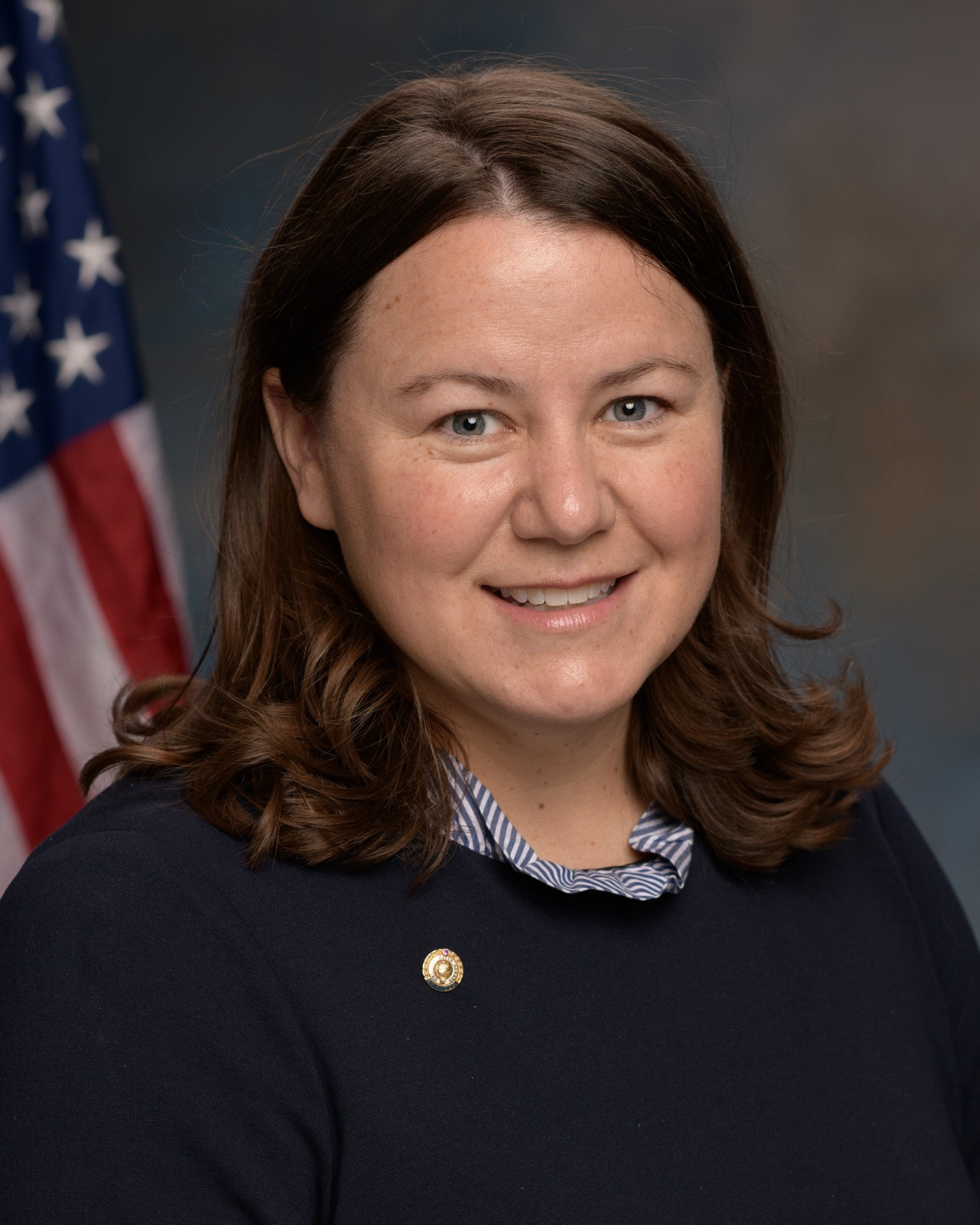
- Incumbent; Jennifer Hemingway since January 3, 2025
- Nominator: Senate Majority Leader
- Appointer: Elected by the Senate
- Inaugural holder: James Mathers
- Deputy: Kelly Fado
- Website: www.senate.gov/about/officers-staff/sergeant-at-arms/sergeant-at-arms-overview.htm

The sergeant at arms and doorkeeper of the United States Senate (originally known as the doorkeeper of the Senate from April 7, 1789 – 1798) is the protocol officer, executive officer, and highest-ranking federal law enforcement officer of the Senate of the United States. The office of the sergeant at arms of the Senate currently has just short of 1,000 full time staff.

== Duties ==
One of the roles of the sergeant at arms is to hold the gavel when not in use. The sergeant at arms can also compel the attendance of an absent senator when ordered to do so by the Senate.

With the architect of the Capitol and the House sergeant at arms, the sergeant at arms serves on the Capitol Police Board, responsible for security around the building.

The sergeant at arms can, upon orders of the Senate, arrest and detain any person who violates Senate rules, or is found in contempt of Congress.

The sergeant at arms is also the executive officer for the Senate and provides senators with computers, equipment, and repair and security services. Unlike the Sergeant of Arms of the House of Representatives who has a ceremonial Mace to keep Order, the Sergeant of Arms of the Senate has the Senate Gavel to keep order.

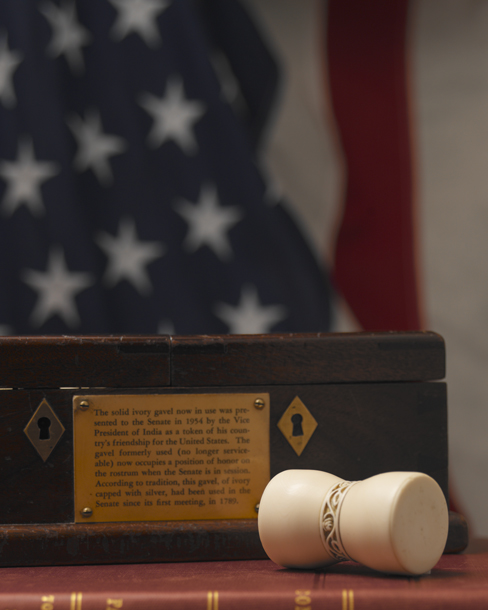
The 1954 ivory Senate gavel, along with the ceremonial mahogany box

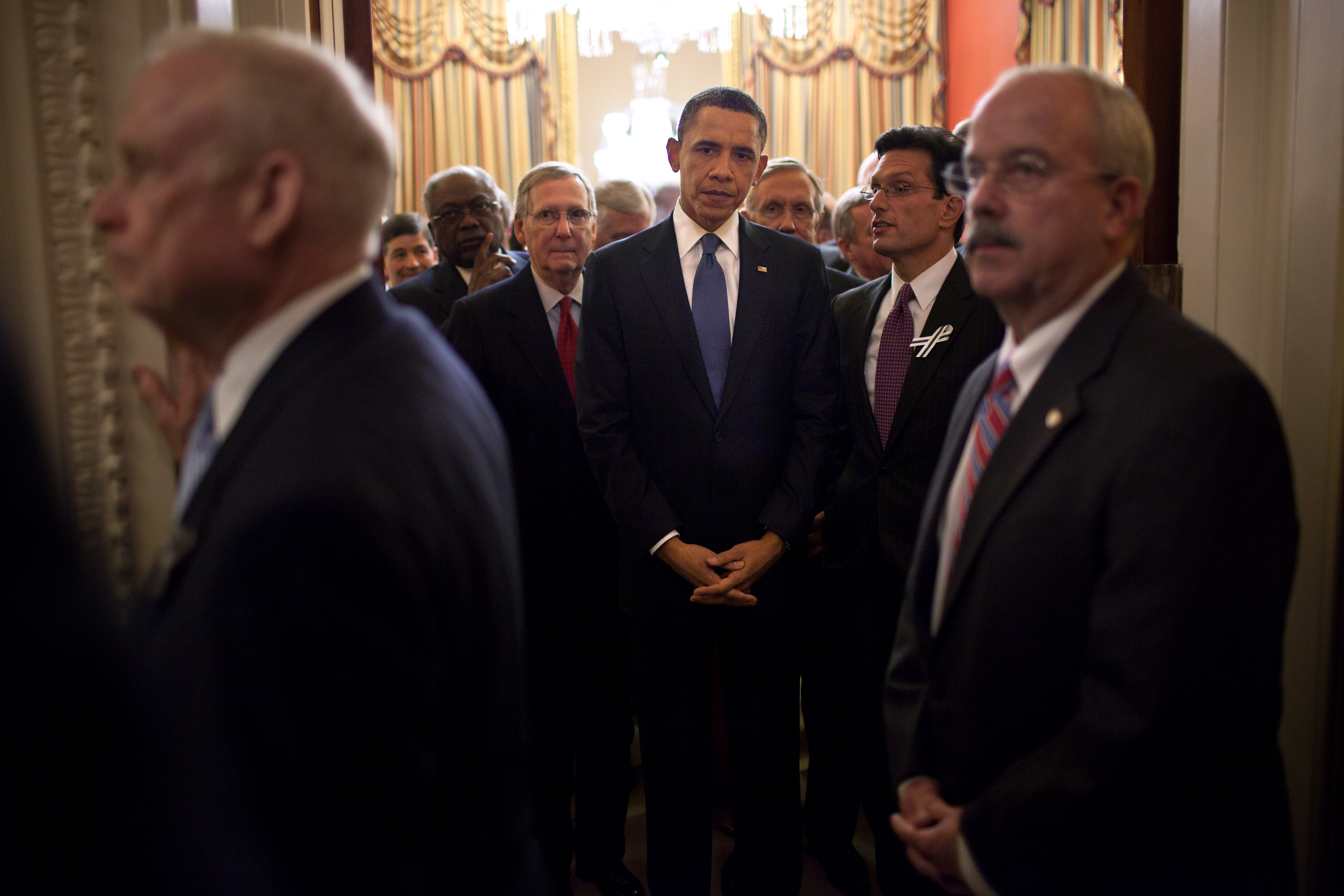
Sergeant at Arms Terrance Gainer (right) escorting President Obama to his 2011 State of the Union Address

== Staff and organization ==
The office of the sergeant at arms of the Senate has between 800 and 900 staff, of the approximately 4,300 working for the Senate overall. Its budget is in the order of $200 million per year. Top officials reporting to the sergeant at arms include a deputy; a chief of staff; assistant sergeant at arms for intelligence and protective services; a CIO; an operations chief; Capitol operations; a general counsel; two legislative liaisons; and a CFO.

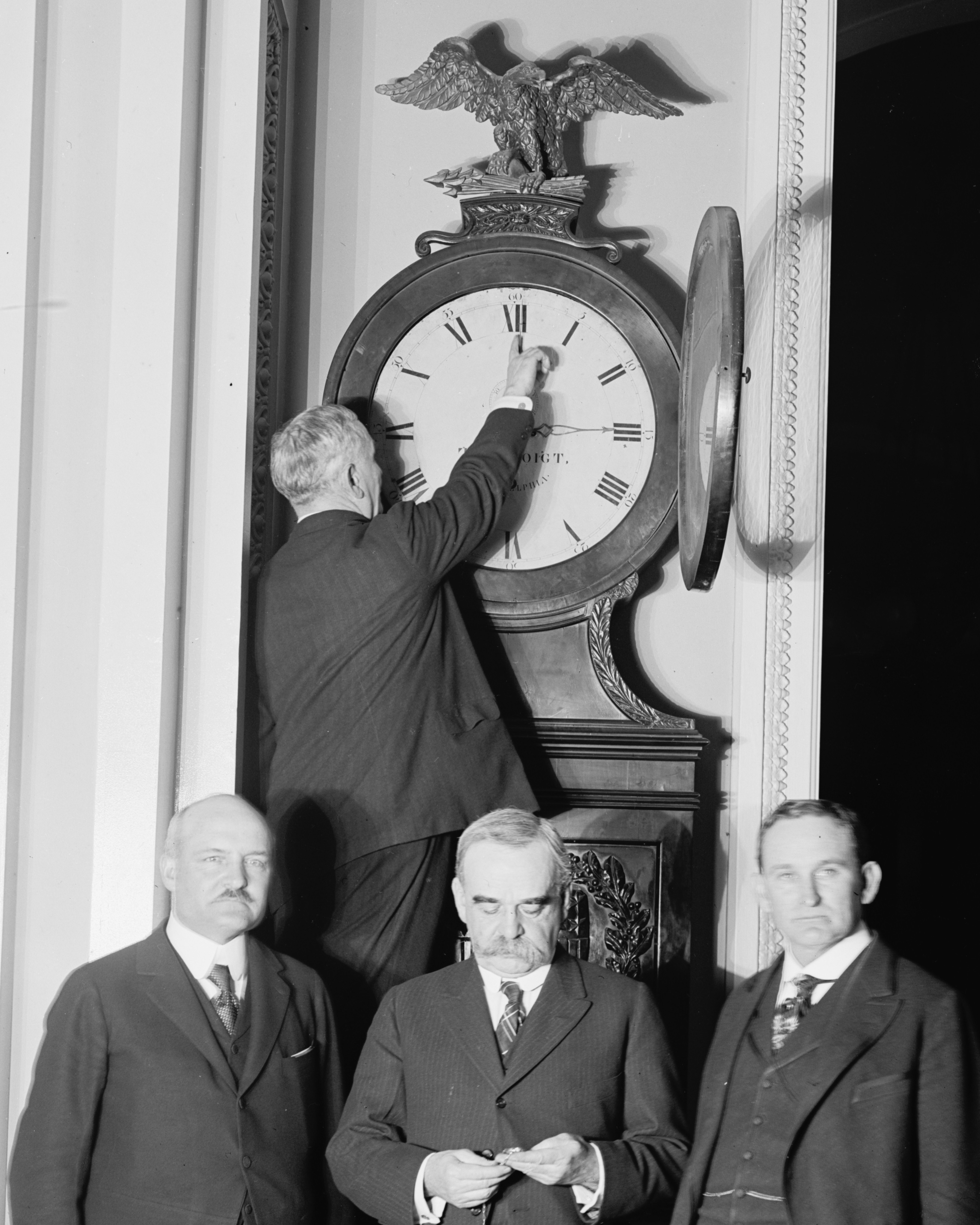
Senate Sergeant at Arms Charles Higgins turns forward the Ohio Clock for the first daylight saving time on March 31, 1918

Historically, the main office of the sergeant at arms once operated out of the Postal Square Building in Washington, D.C. However, modern operations occur at 888 First St. NE, in a building primarily occupied by the Federal Energy Regulatory Commission. The core computer operations are in that building, and the staff manages Internet and intranet connections to offices of senators both in the Capitol complex and back in their home states.

== History ==
The Office of the Doorkeeper was created on April 7, 1789, during the 1st United States Congress to address the Senate's inability to keep a majority of senators in the Capitol long enough to meet quorum and conduct business. The Senate had first convened on March 4, 1789, but only met quorum for the first time on April 6, 1789, one day before the appointment of the first doorkeeper, James C. Mathers. Because Senate sessions were held in private for the first six years, the doorkeeper was in charge of access to those sessions. When the sessions became public, the doorkeeper became in charge of security in the chamber and the gallery.

In 1798, the title of Sergeant at Arms was appended to the Office of the Doorkeeper after Mathers was authorized to compel former senator William Blount to return to Philadelphia and face an impeachment trial. Shortly afterwards the sergeant at arms was given additional powers to compel absent senators to attend sessions, which has typically been used to summon members when ending filibusters in the United States Senate.

In 1829, the sergeant at arms began supervising Senate pages, after the appointment of the first page. In 1854, the Senate's first postmaster and post office initially operated out of the sergeant at arms's office.

In 1867, the sergeant at arms was given regulation-making power to maintain, protect, and police the Capitol and the Senate Office Buildings. The sergeant at arms's role was also expanded to include serving as the Senate's wagon master and keeper of the Senate stables. In 1913, when the Senate purchased its first automobile for use by the vice president, the sergeant at arms also became responsible for leasing, maintenance, traffic control, and parking of all cars around the Capitol.

In 1897, James D. Preston, a doorkeeper in the Senate Press Gallery working under the sergeant at arms, began helping the reporters with collecting legislative bills, gathering information, and organizing interviews with senators. Preston was eventually installed as the first superintendent of the Senate Press Gallery. As new forms of media emerged in the 1930s and 1940s, this superintendent role expanded in parallel.

Martha S. Pope was the first woman to serve as Sergeant at Arms for either chamber, being elected by the Senate for the 102nd and 103rd Congresses.

On January 7, 2021, Senate Democratic Leader Chuck Schumer announced that he would fire the incumbent sergeant at arms, Michael C. Stenger, if he was not fired or did not resign prior to Schumer's being appointed as Senate Majority Leader. This announcement was made the day after the Capitol Building was attacked by a violent group of supporters of President Donald Trump. The attack resulted in the death of at least 5 people and extensive damage of more than $2 million of the building itself. On the same day, Mitch McConnell, the outgoing Senate Majority Leader, asked for and received Stenger's resignation, effective immediately. Deputy Sergeant at Arms Jennifer Hemingway was announced by McConnell as the acting sergeant-at-arms. On January 20, 2021, Eugene Goodman was announced as the acting deputy sergeant at arms of the United States Senate when stepping out onto the inauguration platform ahead of Kamala Harris.

== List of the sergeants at arms of the Senate ==
No.	Image	Officer	State or territory	Tenure	Congress
1		James Mathers	New York	April 7, 1789 – September 2, 1811	1st – 12th
2		Mountjoy Bayly	Maryland	November 6, 1811 – December 9, 1833	12th – 23rd
3		John Shackford	New Hampshire	December 9, 1833 – August 16, 1837	23rd – 25th
4		Stephen Haight	New York	September 4, 1837 – January 12, 1841	25th – 26th
5		Edward Dyer	Maryland	March 8, 1841 – September 16, 1845	27th – 29th
6		Robert Beale	Virginia	December 9, 1845 – March 17, 1853	29th – 33rd
7		Dunning R. McNair	Pennsylvania	March 17, 1853 – July 6, 1861	33rd – 37th
8		George T. Brown	Illinois	July 6, 1861 – March 22, 1869	37th – 41st
9		John R. French	New Hampshire	March 22, 1869 – March 24, 1879	41st – 46th
10		Richard J. Bright	Indiana	March 24, 1879 – December 18, 1883	46th – 48th
11		William P. Canaday	North Carolina	December 18, 1883 – June 30, 1890	48th – 51st
12		Edward K. Valentine	Nebraska	June 30, 1890 – August 7, 1893	51st – 53rd
13		Richard J. Bright	Indiana	August 8, 1893 – February 1, 1900	53rd – 56th
14		Daniel M. Ransdell	Indiana	February 1, 1900 – August 26, 1912	56th – 62nd
15		E. Livingston Cornelius	Maryland	December 10, 1912 – March 4, 1913	62nd
16		Charles P. Higgins	Missouri	March 13, 1913 – March 3, 1919	63rd – 65th
17		David S. Barry	Rhode Island	May 19, 1919 – February 7, 1933	66th – 72nd
18		Chesley W. Jurney	Texas	March 9, 1933 – January 31, 1943	73rd – 78th
19		Wall Doxey	Mississippi	February 1, 1943 – January 3, 1947	78th – 79th
20		Edward F. McGinnis	Illinois	January 4, 1947 – January 2, 1949	80th
21		Joseph C. Duke	Arizona	January 3, 1949 – January 2, 1953	81st – 82nd
22		Forest A. Harness	Indiana	January 3, 1953 – January 4, 1955	83rd – 84th
23		Joseph C. Duke	Arizona	January 5, 1955 – December 30, 1965	84th – 89th
24		Robert G. Dunphy	Rhode Island	January 14, 1966 – June 30, 1972	89th – 92nd
25		William H. Wannall	Maryland	July 1, 1972 – December 17, 1975	92nd – 94th
26		Frank "Nordy" Hoffman	Indiana	December 18, 1975 – January 4, 1981	94th – 97th
27		Howard Liebengood	Virginia	January 5, 1981 – September 12, 1983	97th – 98th
28		Larry E. Smith	Virginia	September 13, 1983 – June 2, 1985	98th – 99th
29		Ernest E. Garcia	Kansas	June 3, 1985 – January 5, 1987	99th – 100th
30		Henry K. Giugni	Hawaii	January 6, 1987 – December 31, 1990	100th – 101st
31		Martha S. Pope	Connecticut	January 3, 1991 – April 14, 1994	102nd – 103rd
32		Robert Laurent Benoit	Maine	April 15, 1994 – January 3, 1995	103rd
33		Howard O. Greene Jr.	Delaware	January 4, 1995 – September 6, 1996	104th
34		Gregory S. Casey	Idaho	September 6, 1996 – November 9, 1998	104th – 105th
35		James W. Ziglar	Mississippi	November 9, 1998 – August 2, 2001	105th – 107th
36		Alfonso Lenhardt	New York	September 4, 2001 – March 16, 2003	107th – 108th
37		William Pickle	Colorado	March 17, 2003 – January 4, 2007	108th – 110th
38		Terrance Gainer	Illinois	January 4, 2007 – May 2, 2014	110th – 113th
39		Andrew Willison	Ohio	May 5, 2014 – January 6, 2015	113th – 114th
40		Frank J. Larkin	Maryland	January 6, 2015 – April 16, 2018	114th – 115th
41		Michael C. Stenger	New Jersey	April 16, 2018 – January 7, 2021	115th – 117th
–		Jennifer Hemingway (acting)	Washington D.C.	January 7, 2021 - March 22, 2021	117th
42		Karen Gibson	Montana	March 22, 2021 – January 3, 2025	117th – 118th
43		Jennifer Hemingway	Washington D.C.	January 3, 2025 – present	119th - Present

=== List of the deputies ===
No.	Image	Officer	State or territory	Tenure	Congress
–		James Morhard		2015–2018	114th–115th
–		Jennifer Hemingway		2018 – January 7, 2021	115th–117th
–		Eugene Goodman (acting)		January 20, 2021 - March 2, 2021	117th
–		Kelly Fado		March 22, 2021 – present	117th – 118th - present

== See also ==
- Sergeant at Arms of the United States House of Representatives
- Serjeant-at-arms
