= Michael C. Stenger =

American law enforcement officer (1950–2022)

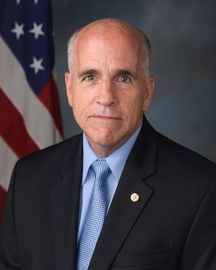

41st Sergeant at Arms of the United States Senate
- In office April 16, 2018 – January 7, 2021
- Leader: Mitch McConnell
- Preceded by: Frank J. Larkin
- Succeeded by: Jennifer Hemingway (acting)

Personal details
- Born: Michael Conrad Stenger; July 11, 1950
- Died: June 27, 2022 (aged 71)
- Spouse: Janet Oechsner
- Children: 2
- Education: Fairleigh Dickinson University (BA)

Military service
- Branch/service: United States Marine Corps
- Years of service: 1972–1976
- Rank: Captain

Michael Conrad Stenger (July 11, 1950 – June 27, 2022) was an American law enforcement officer who served as the 41st Sergeant at Arms of the United States Senate from April 16, 2018, to January 7, 2021.

== Early life and career ==
Stenger was a native of Wood-Ridge, New Jersey. He graduated from Fairleigh Dickinson University with a Bachelor of Arts degree and was a captain in the United States Marine Corps before joining the United States Secret Service.

== Career ==
Stenger spent 35 years in the Secret Service and served stints as Assistant Director for the Office of Investigations and the Assistant Director of the Office of Protective Research. In 2008, he became Assistant Director for the USSS Office of Government and Public Affairs, which coordinated with groups that included the United States Congress. In 2011, he joined the office of the Sergeant at Arms of the United States Senate as Assistant Sergeant at Arms for the Office of Protective Services and Continuity, became Deputy Sergeant at Arms in May 2014, and Chief of Staff for the Sergeant at Arms in January 2015.

On April 16, 2018, after Sergeant at Arms Frank J. Larkin retired, Michael C. Stenger was nominated as the 41st Sergeant at Arms under Senate Resolution 465, put forth by Senate Majority Leader Mitch McConnell. This resolution was submitted in the Senate, considered, and agreed to without amendment by unanimous consent.

=== Responding to the 2021 Capitol attack ===
On January 6, 2021, for more than an hour during the storming of the Capitol that resulted in harm to the Congress, the Capitol, and the process of accepting and counting the votes of the Electoral College, Stenger and House Sergeant-at-arms Paul Irving (members of the Capitol Police Board) repeatedly refused to request the assistance of the D.C. National Guard. The following day, he resigned as the Senate sergeant-at-arms, with his deputy Jennifer Hemingway taking over on an interim basis. The two other top Capitol security officials—House sergeant-at-arms Paul D. Irving and United States Capitol Police chief Steven Sund—also resigned on the same day, amid bipartisan shock and outrage over security lapses that led to the mob's breach and occupation of the Capitol. At 1:09, Sund called Irving and Stenger and asked them for an emergency declaration required to call in the D.C. National Guard; they both told Sund they would "run it up the chain". Irving called back with formal approval an hour later. Irving would later deny the 1:09 p.m. conversation took place, though the call was substantiated by phone records. In September 2023, Sund testified before the United States House Administration Subcommittee on Oversight. He argued that intelligence officials were responsible for the Capitol attack, and that they had neglected to properly share warnings about the potential of the event becoming violent. Republican members of the subcommittee indicated they felt Sund received disproportionate blame for the attack on the Capitol from political figures including Pelosi.

In December 2024, the Subcommittee on Oversight of the 118th Congress released an interim report addressing the security failures of January 6, 2021. The bipartisan report concluded that former Capitol Police Chief Steven Sund had “unfairly shouldered the bulk of the blame for the security failures of that day.” It emphasized that Sund’s reputation had been unjustly maligned in the immediate aftermath but was “restored” through the subcommittee’s investigation, which uncovered systemic failures and miscommunications across agencies, including the Pentagon and the D.C. National Guard.

== Personal life and death ==
Stenger was married to the former Janet Oechsner, and they had two children. He died from natural causes on June 27, 2022, at the age of 71.

Government offices
Preceded by Frank J. Larkin	41st Sergeant at Arms of the United States Senate; 2018–2021	Succeeded by Jennifer Hemingway (acting)
