= Steven Sund =

American police officer and memoirist (born 1972)

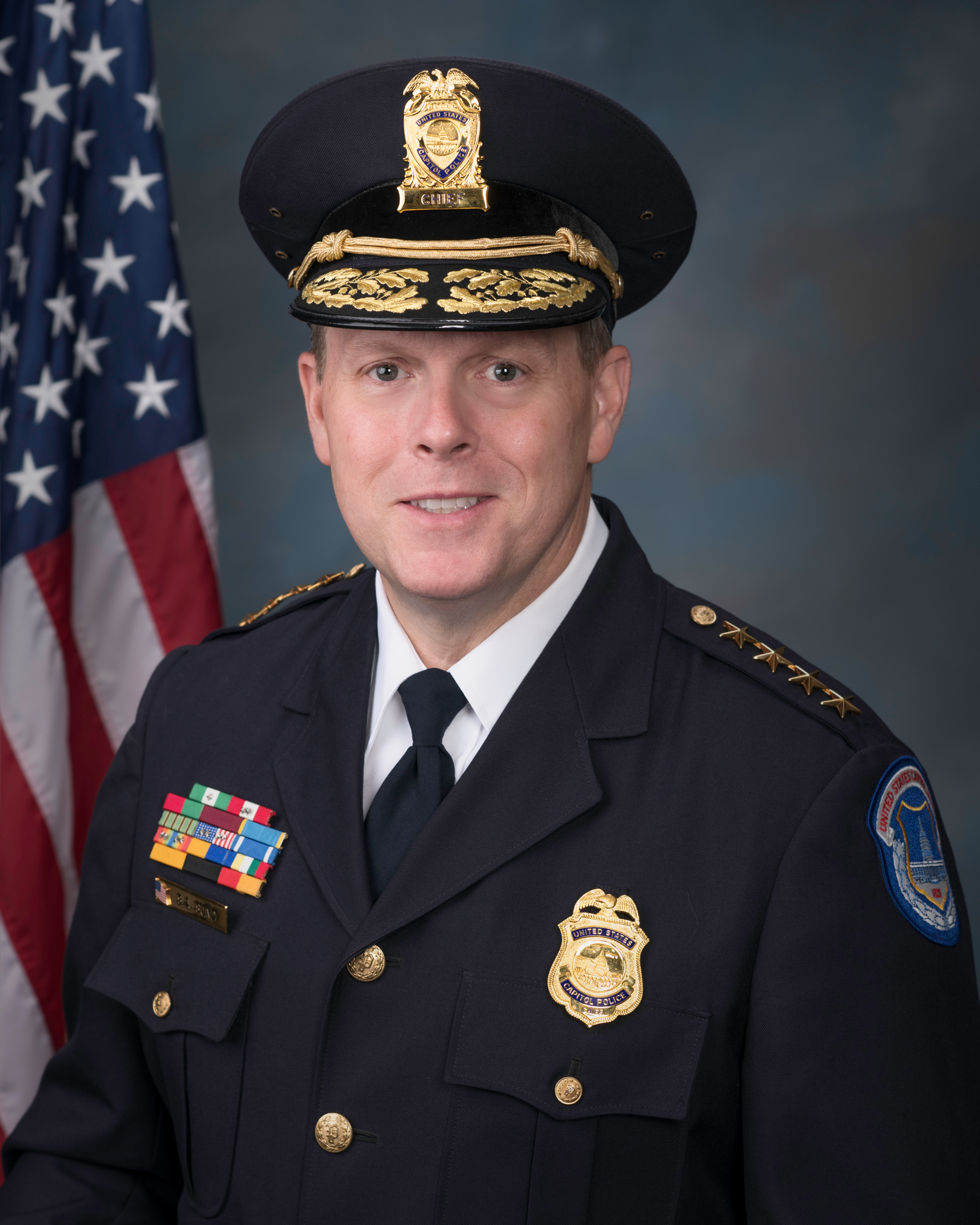
- Official portrait, 2019

10th Chief of the United States Capitol Police
- In office June 14, 2019 – January 8, 2021
- Preceded by: Matthew Verderosa
- Succeeded by: J. Thomas Manger

Personal details
- Born: April 6, 1972 (age 54) Suffolk County, New York, U.S.
- Education: Johns Hopkins University (BS, MS); Naval Postgraduate School (MA)

Steven A. Sund (born 6 April 1972) is a retired American law enforcement official, author and public speaker. Sund was a member of the D.C. Metropolitan Police Department for 25 years, where he was commander of the force's Special Operations Division. He joined the U.S. Capitol Police in 2017, becoming its chief in 2019. He led the force during the January 6 Capitol attack, after which he faced widespread criticism for the perceived security failures of that day.

A December 2024 interim report by the Subcommittee on Oversight of the 118th Congress concluded that Sund had “unfairly shouldered the bulk of the blame” and highlighted systemic failures across federal agencies. Following his resignation, Sund became an advocate for law enforcement reform and national security preparedness. Sund authored the book Courage Under Fire: Under Siege and Outnumbered 58 to 1 on January 6, which became an Amazon bestseller and provided his perspective on the events of that day.

== Education ==
Sund received a BS and MS from Johns Hopkins University, and an MA in homeland security from the Naval Postgraduate School.

== D.C. Metropolitan Police ==
Sund was a member of the Metropolitan Police Department of the District of Columbia for more than 25 years before retiring in 2015. He was “widely respected in the District and among leaders of U.S. Secret Service, U.S. Park Police” and other law enforcement agencies.

During his career, Sund coordinated a number of National Special Security Events by the Department of Homeland Security, including the presidential inaugurations of 2001, 2005, 2009, and 2013. Sund was the on-scene incident commander at the 2009 United States Holocaust Memorial Museum shooting, the 2012 shooting at the Family Research Council, and the 2013 Washington Navy Yard shooting. In addition, as Commander of the Special Operations Division he handled dozens of criminal barricades with a record of zero fatalities.

Sund has “protected every living President” from Carter to Biden while working alongside the US Secret Service. Sund authored many of the special events manuals for the District of Columbia and helped shape the Department of Homeland Security's National Response Framework. He also has instructed the U.S. Secret Service in major events planning and has taught Incident Command System as an adjunct professor at the George Washington University.

Sund retired from the Metropolitan Police Department as Commander of the Special Operations Division. Thereafter he worked for Noblis as the Director of Business Development for National Security and Intelligence.

== U.S. Capitol Police ==
In 2017, Sund joined the United States Capitol Police as the Assistant Chief of Police and Chief of Operations. In June 2019, Sund was sworn in as the tenth Chief of the United States Capitol Police.

=== Responding to the 2021 Capitol attack ===
Sund was chief when, on January 6, 2021, rioters stormed the U.S. Capitol building while Congress was counting the electoral votes of the 2020 presidential election. Rioters were able to reach the chambers of the Senate and the House of Representatives, marking the first time since 1814 that the Capitol building had been breached.

Capitol Police received major backlash after video emerged of what looked like some officers allowing rioters into the Capitol, and another officer filmed taking a selfie with rioters.

Sund said in February 2021 that on January 3, he contacted House Sergeant-at-Arms Paul D. Irving and Senate Sergeant-at-Arms Michael C. Stenger to request support from the D.C. National Guard in advance of the January 6 joint-session of Congress. According to Sund, his request was denied by Irving who stated concerns about "optics".

=== Resignation ===
In the early morning hours of January 7, Sund issued a statement defending the department's response. That afternoon, during a televised press conference, House Speaker Nancy Pelosi called for Sund's resignation, citing "a failure of leadership at the top" of the department and that Sund had not contacted her since the event. An aide to Pelosi later corrected the statement, as Pelosi and Sund had in fact spoken on the evening of January 6.

That afternoon, Sund submitted a letter of resignation stating his intention to remain in the post until January 16. The following day, January 8, Sund's command ended.

=== Aftermath ===
On February 1, 2021, Sund sent a letter to Speaker Pelosi detailing the events leading up to and including January 6. Sund provided a timeline for the aid he sought from local law enforcement agencies and D.C. National Guard units, and an accounting of the meetings he had after the perimeter had been breached while he sought assistance. Toward the end of the letter, Sund acknowledged a breakdown in some systems, which he argued could nonetheless be rectified through provision of resources, training, updates to policy, and accountability. He did not specify which systems failed but pointed to the lack of intelligence, noting officials did not predict an armed assault on the Capitol.

On February 23, Sund testified before Senate committees about the Capitol riot. Sund later stated he regretted his resignation.

On March 3, 2021, Major General William J. Walker, commanding officer of the D.C. National Guard testified at a U.S. Senate hearing. His testimony supported Sund's account of events. Walker testified that he spoke with Sund at 1:49 p.m. Walker said, "It was an urgent plea" from Sund, "and his voice was cracking, and he was serious, he needed help right then and there, every available Guardsman." Within minutes of the call, the Capitol was breached.

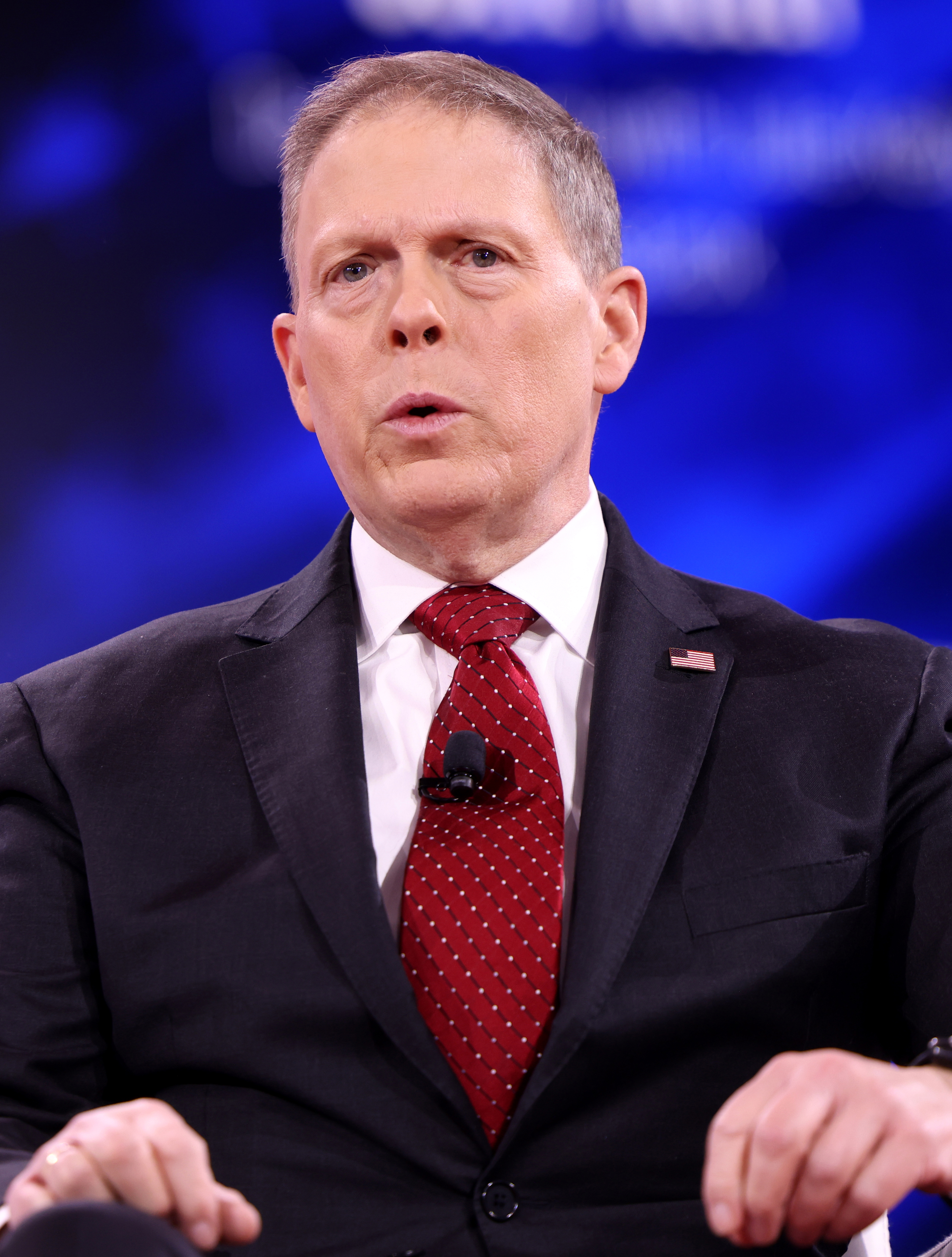
Sund at the 2025 Conservative Political Action Conference

Sund maintained that the U.S. Capitol Police "did not fail", that its officers had acted bravely and that, "outnumbered and against tremendous odds", they had maintained the safety of members of Congress.

External videos
- After Words interview with Sund on Courage Under Fire, January 8, 2023, C-SPAN

Sund has written a book, Courage Under Fire: Under Siege and Outnumbered 58 to 1 on January 6 (ISBN 9798200983520), published in January 2023 by Blackstone Publishing. It became an "Amazon triple bestseller" in the first week of publication. In the book, Sund highlights failures by several intelligence agencies to heed various warnings of the January 6 attack.

In September 2023, Sund testified before the United States House Administration Subcommittee on Oversight. He argued that intelligence officials were responsible for the Capitol attack, and that they had neglected to properly share warnings about the potential of the event becoming violent. Republican members of the subcommittee indicated they felt Sund received disproportionate blame for the attack on the Capitol from political figures including Pelosi.

In December 2024, the Subcommittee on Oversight of the 118th Congress released an interim report addressing the security failures of January 6, 2021. The bipartisan report concluded that former Capitol Police Chief Steven Sund had “unfairly shouldered the bulk of the blame for the security failures of that day.” It emphasized that Sund's reputation had been unjustly maligned in the immediate aftermath but was “restored” through the subcommittee's investigation, which uncovered systemic failures and miscommunications across agencies, including the Pentagon and the D.C. National Guard.
