= 1997 Roby standoff =

1997 police standoff in Roby, Illinois

- Date: September 22 – October 31, 1997 (39 days)
- Location: Roby, Illinois, United States
- Caused by: Law enforcement attempt to serve court order to bring Allen into involuntary commitment during a mental health crisis
- Goals: Safe apprehension of Allen (law enforcement)
- Result: Allen apprehended and transferred to a mental hospital without injuries on October 31

Parties
Shirley Ann Allen	Christian County Sheriff's Office; Illinois State Police

Lead figures
Shirley Ann Allen	Terrance Gainer

Casualties and losses
None	1 police dog wounded

Casualties
- Death: 0
- Injuries: 1 (police dog)
- Arrested: 1 (Allen)

The 1997 Roby standoff, sometimes referred to as "Roby Ridge", was a standoff that occurred over the course of 39 days from September 22 to October 31, 1997, in Roby, Illinois, involving law enforcement and Shirley Allen, a 51-year-old woman resisting involuntary commitment. It is one of the longest single-person standoffs in history, and was the longest standoff in the history of the Illinois State Police. The standoff was the subject of a minor media circus in late 1997, and Allen was supported by libertarians and the American militia movement, some of whom traveled to Roby to support her. The only casualty of the standoff was a police dog that was shot and wounded by Allen.

== Background ==
Shirley Ann Allen (born 1946–47) is a retired nurse who lived in a two-story farmhouse in Roby, an unincorporated area of Christian County, Illinois, approximately 20 miles southeast of Springfield. In 1989, Allen's husband, John, died of pancreatic cancer in her living room, leaving her alone. His death deeply affected her, and she began exhibiting severe paranoia, believing she was being watched by helicopters that spoke to her and that items in her house kept moving or disappearing.

Allen's family became increasingly concerned with her delusions and so-called "erratic behavior". Convinced she needed psychiatric care, Allen's family asked the district attorney for help, and the court ordered Allen into involuntary commitment in Springfield.

Allen supporters, including one of her close friends, claim that Allen's mental decline had been exaggerated by her family and that they sought her institutionalization to gain ownership over her 47-acre property, which contained two oil wells.

== Standoff ==
On September 22, 1997, three Christian County Sheriff's Office deputies arrived at Allen's house to serve the commitment papers. Accompanying the deputies was their friend Byron Dugger, Allen's brother. When the deputies knocked on her door, Allen answered holding a bolt action shotgun. The deputies and Duggan retreated to call for assistance from the Illinois State Police (ISP), who surrounded her property and initiated a standoff. ISP Director Terrance Gainer chose to simply wait for Allen to surrender, and stated police were "there for this woman's protection and for the protection of her neighbors. I think we're doing the right thing. We can't afford not to."

Over the course of the siege, which lasted 39 days, sheriff's deputies and state troopers tried numerous methods to coax Allen out of her house. At first, deputies fired 40 mm tear gas rounds into her house, hoping to smoke her out; however, Allen, familiar with the effects of tear gas from her medical career, covered herself in petroleum jelly and a wet towel, protecting her from the irritants in the gas. Attempts at using rubber bullets to stun her also failed, as she wore several layers of clothing stuffed with pillows and magazines, as well as multiple hats, ensuring they had little effect. When a police dog was sent to distract and calm Allen, she fired at it with her shotgun, wounding it. The utilities to Allen's property were also cut, again to little effect: she was using battery-powered devices, subsided on a preexisting stockpile of canned food, and had already been relying on bottled water after her property's well ran dry.

Allen fired two shots over the course of the siege, but otherwise she stayed quiet inside her house for the majority of it, rarely venturing out onto her deck. Attempts at negotiating with her failed, as she refused to communicate with anyone outside her house. After several weeks of no progress, Gainer decided the best course of action was to have police withdraw from sight and monitor her from a distance, in the hopes that Allen would calm down and "resume a normal, unarmed routine". In an apparent attempt to "soothe her", police began to loudly play classical music and songs by Barry Manilow (apparently her favorite genre and music artist respectively) over speakers toward Allen's house. Hidden cameras were also placed on her property, including one hidden in a bucket on her back porch, but Allen would frequently notice them and cut their wires, disabling them.

As the standoff dragged on, police presence and actions began to frustrate Roby residents, as well as libertarians and militiamen from across the United States, and a small but vocal group of Allen sympathizers emerged. Several supporters traveled to Roby to show their support for Allen and hold rallies demanding police leave her alone. Some people tried to get a closer look to see what was going on or, in the case of one onlooker who camped outside police barricades for most of the siege, to ensure police did not harm or abuse her. One neighbor was arrested for trying to sneak onto Allen's property to deliver her food and water, while others paid her bills for her. Opposing the Allen sympathizers were critics who believed police should have stormed Allen's property or fired back whenever she shot, citing the length and high cost of the siege—reportedly over $650,000, much more than the ISP's budget for security at the 1996 Democratic National Convention in Chicago. Supporters and the media coined a nickname for the standoff: "Roby Ridge", evoking the 1992 Ruby Ridge standoff in Idaho that was a cause célèbre for the militia movement, although police discouraged its use.

In an attempt to calm Allen's supporters, Gainer contacted J.J. Johnson, a former militia leader, and Jack McLamb, a former police officer who was present at the Ruby Ridge standoff, who had both traveled to Roby to protest the police siege. After Gainer met with them and discussed his perspective, Johnson and McLamb came around to understand police actions, but their attempts at expressing this at a rally led to the protestors labeling them traitors. Responding to criticisms of excessive time and cost, Gainer explained that while it would probably have been justifiable to raid Allen's property early, they would simply be criticized for being aggressive instead, and that he was willing to be patient if it meant Allen's life would be at less risk.

=== End of standoff ===
On October 31, around noon, police heard what they believed was Allen loading her shotgun, and advanced to her house. She stepped onto her back porch twice to leave out trays of food and water that police had regularly left for her. She then stepped out a third time to cut the bucket camera's wire, but struggled to do so. A trooper positioned near her porch saw the glint of the scissors in Allen's hand and, believing it was a firearm, fired six rubber bullets at her, striking her with three bullets in her leg, side, and chest. Allen fell to the ground, where she was subdued and detained in plastic handcuffs.

After being handcuffed, Allen was consoled by a trooper and led to the front of her house, where she conversed with police and relatives. She reportedly "slipped in and out of rational conversation", during which she claimed there were helicopters telling her to stay inside, and made her relatives open their mouths so she could see their teeth and lips to ensure they were not wearing masks. When police learned that she had not consumed anything in three days, they offered her a drink, but Allen refused, claiming the helicopters were insisting it was poisonous; after a trooper and Allen's relatives each took a sip to confirm it was not poisoned, Allen drank the entire jug. After 45 minutes, Allen was carried on a stretcher to a waiting ambulance that took her to St. John's Hospital in Springfield, where she was assessed to be in good condition.

Inside Allen's house, police found that it was "neat and tidy" aside from windows that had been broken by police over the course of the standoff. Allen had been sleeping in her living room, where John had died, and kept her shotgun on a table there. She also had two battery-powered radios tuned to WUIS, the NPR station in Springfield, which was coincidentally the only media outlet in the area Gainer had not contacted about the standoff. Gainer was satisfied with the peaceful end to the standoff, as was Governor Jim Edgar, many Roby residents, and even some Allen sympathizers who had expected a worse conclusion.

== Aftermath ==
Allen was not charged with any crimes, but she was billed approximately $20,000 for each day that the standoff lasted. The ISP agreed to pay for her broken windows alongside any damage police had inflicted to her property during the standoff. Allen was transferred to the custody of the Andrew McFarland Mental Health Center. On December 16, after 47 days of hospitalization, she was released back to her home in Roby awaiting a court-ordered psychiatric evaluation to determine if she required further commitment, after doctors declared she did not pose a significant threat. As of 2007, she was reported to still be living in her same house in Roby.

The standoff drew national attention as one of the longest standoffs involving a single suspect in history. Political controversies over the cost of the operation and involuntary commitment laws ensued. The Libertarian Party called for reform of Illinois mental health laws that provide for the hospitalization of people who do not break the law.
