= Siege =

Military land blockade of a location

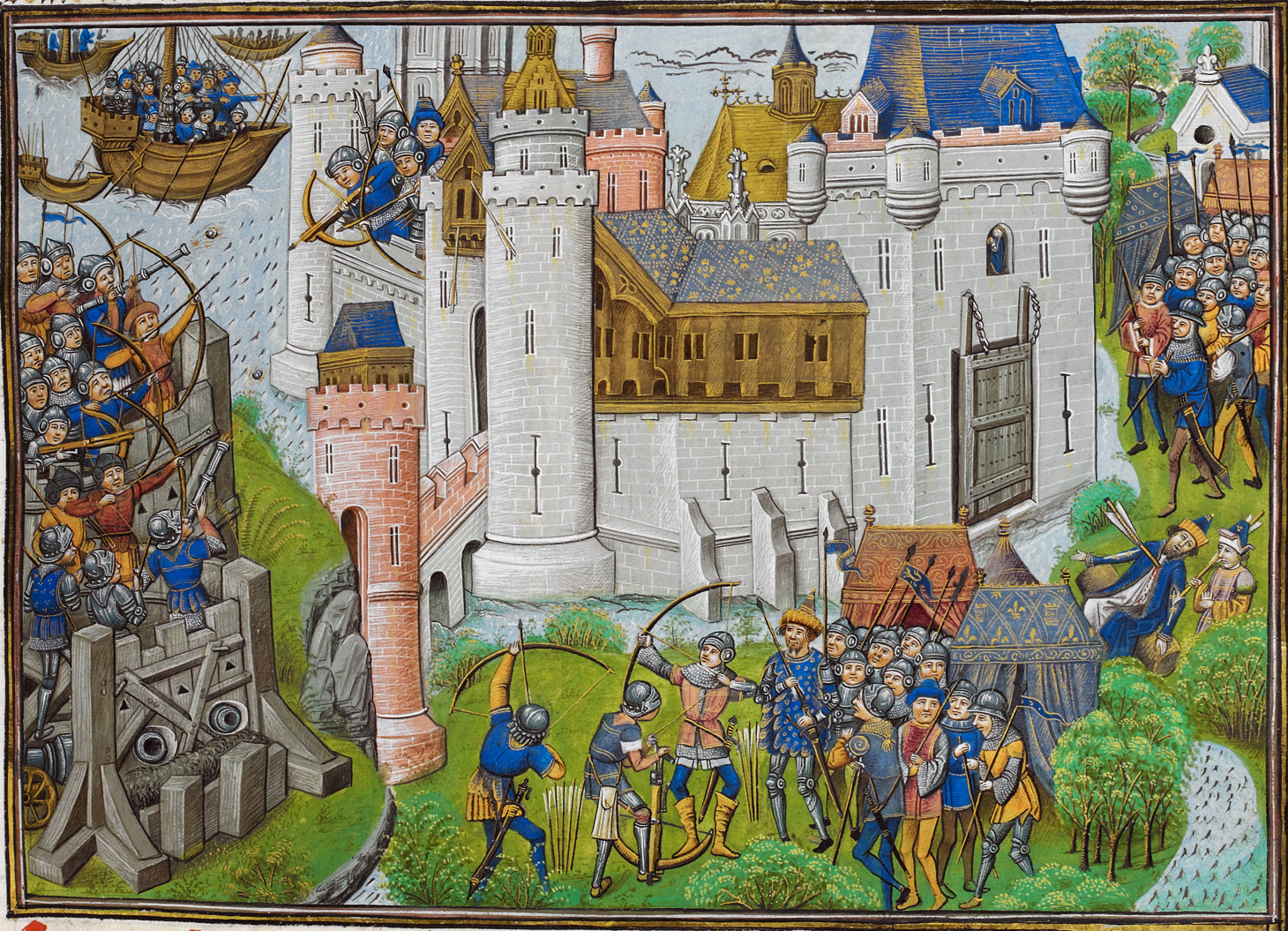
Depiction of the 1377 siege of Mortagne during the Hundred Years' War

A siege (from Latin sedere 'to sit') is a military blockade of a city, or fortress, with the intent of conquering by attrition, or by well-prepared assault. Siege warfare (also called siegecraft or poliorcetics) is a form of constant, low-intensity conflict characterized by one party holding a strong, static, defensive position. This party is called a garrison. The attacking party is said to be laying siege and those on the defense are under siege. Consequently, an opportunity for negotiation between combatants is common, as proximity and fluctuating advantage can encourage diplomacy.

A siege occurs when an attacker encounters a city or fortress that cannot be easily taken by a quick assault, and which refuses to surrender. Sieges involve surrounding the target to block provision of supplies and reinforcement or escape of troops (a tactic known as "investment"). This is typically coupled with attempts to reduce the fortifications by means of siege engines, artillery bombardment, or mining (also known as sapping), or the use of deception or treachery to bypass defenses.

Failing a military outcome, sieges can often be decided by starvation, thirst, or disease, which can afflict either the attacker or defender. This form of siege, though, can take many months or even years, depending upon the size of the stores of food the fortified position holds. The attacking force can circumvallate the besieged place, which is to build a line of earth-works, consisting of a rampart and trench, surrounding it. During the process of circumvallation, the attacking force can be set upon by another force, an ally of the besieged place, due to the lengthy amount of time required to force it to capitulate. A defensive ring of forts outside the ring of circumvallated forts, called contravallation, is also sometimes used to defend the attackers from outside.

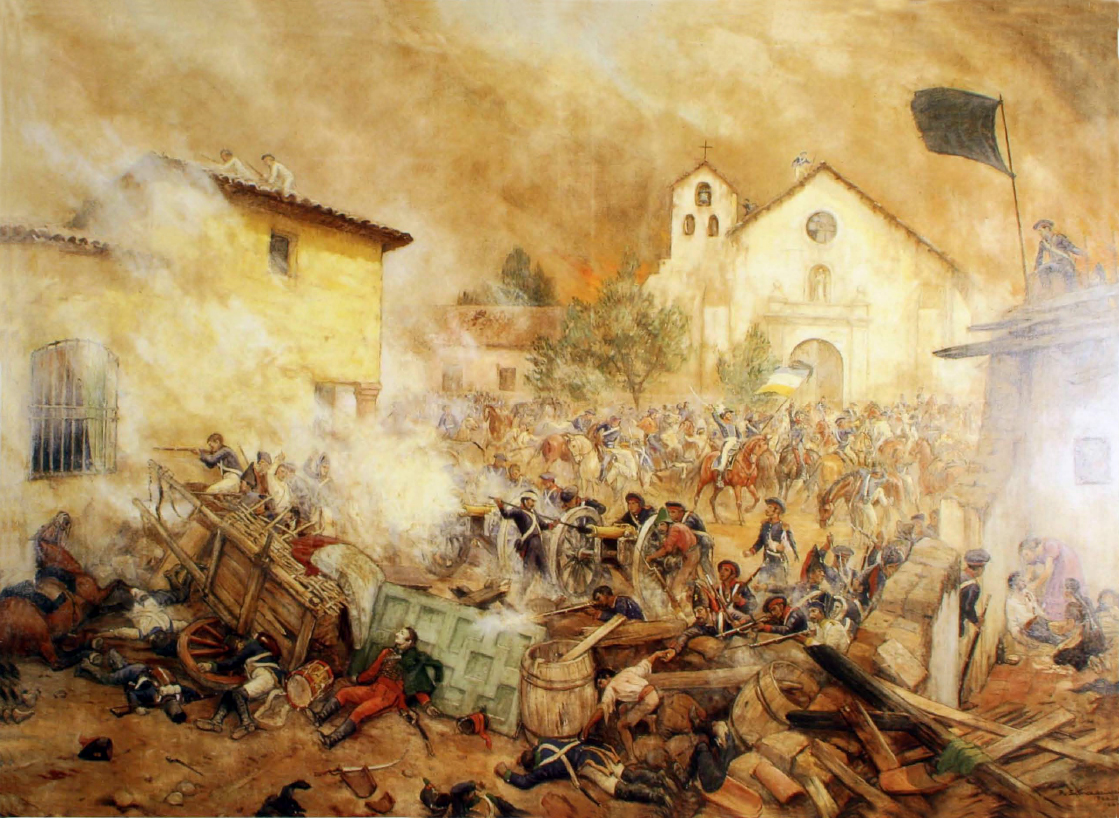
The siege of Rancagua during the Chilean War of Independence, painting by Pedro Subercaseaux

Ancient cities in the Middle East show archaeological evidence of fortified city walls. During the Warring States period of ancient China, there is both textual and archaeological evidence of prolonged sieges and siege machinery used against the defenders of city walls. Siege machinery was also a tradition of the ancient Greco-Roman world. During the Renaissance and the early modern period, siege warfare dominated the conduct of war in Europe. Leonardo da Vinci gained some of his renown from design of fortifications. Medieval campaigns were generally designed around a succession of sieges. In the Napoleonic era, increasing use of ever more powerful cannons reduced the value of fortifications. In the 20th century, the significance of the classical siege declined. With the advent of mobile warfare, a single fortified stronghold is no longer as decisive as it once was. While traditional sieges do still occur, they are not as common as they once were due to changes in modes of battle, principally the ease by which huge volumes of destructive power can be directed onto a static target. Modern sieges are more commonly the result of smaller hostage, militant, or extreme resisting arrest situations.

== Ancient period ==
=== The necessity of city walls ===
City walls and fortifications were essential for the defence of the first cities. The walls were built of mudbricks, stone, wood, or a combination of these materials, depending on local availability. They may also have served the dual purpose of showing potential enemies the might of the kingdom. The great walls surrounding the Sumerian city of Uruk in the ancient Near East gained a widespread reputation. The walls were 9.5 km (5.9 mi) in length, and up to 12 m (39 ft) in height.

Some settlements in the Indus Valley civilization were also fortified. By about 3500 BC, hundreds of small farming villages dotted the Indus River floodplain. Many of these settlements had fortifications and planned streets.

The stone and mud brick houses of Kot Diji were clustered behind massive stone flood dikes and defensive walls, for neighbouring communities quarrelled constantly about the control of prime agricultural land. Mundigak (c. 2500 BC) in present-day south-east Afghanistan has defensive walls and square bastions of sun-dried bricks.

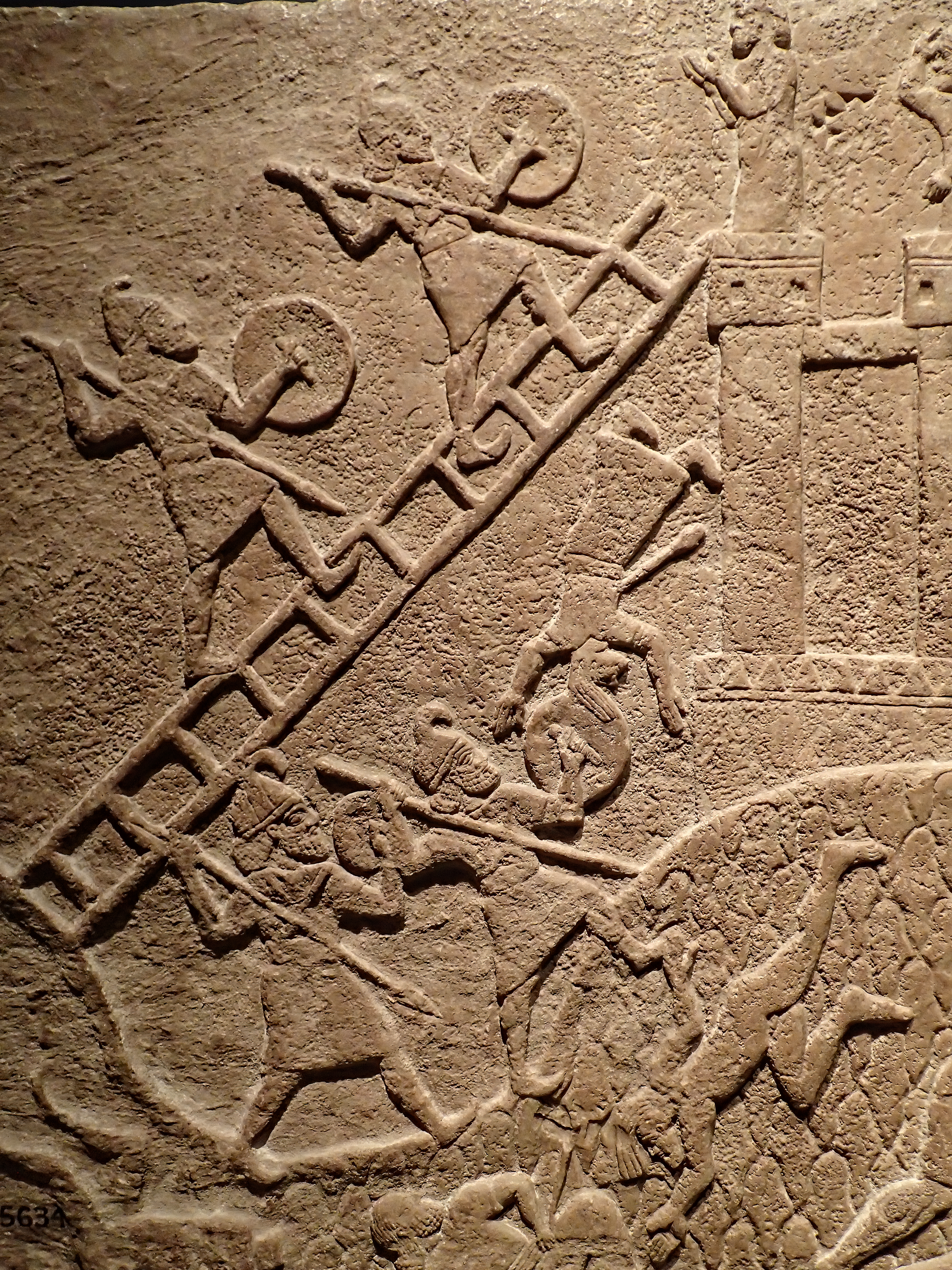
Assyrians using siege ladders in a relief of attack on an enemy town during the reign of Tiglath-Pileser III 720–738 BCE from his palace at Kalhu (Nimrud)

The Assyrians deployed large labour forces to build new palaces, temples, and defensive walls. Later, the walls of Babylon, reinforced by towers, moats, and ditches, gained a similar reputation. In Anatolia, the Hittites built massive stone walls around their cities atop hillsides, taking advantage of the terrain. In Shang dynasty China, at the site of Ao, large walls were erected in the 15th century BC that had dimensions of 20 m (66 ft) in width at the base and enclosed an area of some 1,900 m (2,100 yd) squared. The ancient Chinese capital for the State of Zhao, Handan, founded in 386 BC, also had walls that were 20 m (66 ft) wide at the base; they were 15 m (49 ft) tall, with two separate sides of its rectangular enclosure at a length of 1,400 m (1,530 yd).

The cities of the Indus Valley Civilization showed less effort in constructing defences, as did the Minoan civilization on Crete. These civilizations probably relied more on the defence of their outer borders or sea shores. Unlike the ancient Minoan civilization, the Mycenaean Greeks emphasized the need for fortifications alongside natural defences of mountainous terrain, such as the massive Cyclopean walls built at Mycenae and other adjacent Late Bronze Age (c. 1600–1100 BC) centers of central and southern Greece.

=== Archaeological evidence ===
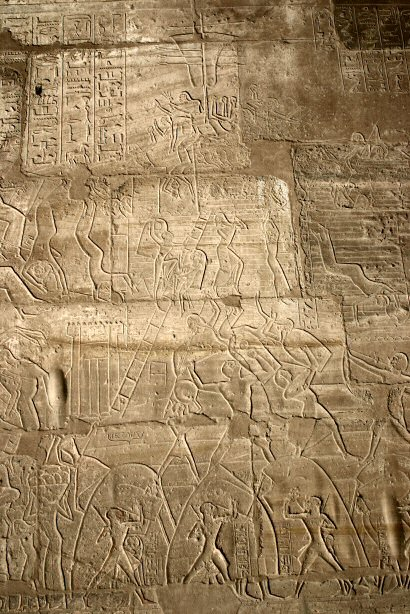
The Egyptian siege of Dapur in the 13th century BC, from Ramesseum, Thebes

Although there are depictions of sieges from the ancient Near East in historical sources and in art, there are very few examples of siege systems that have been found archaeologically. Of the few examples, several are noteworthy:

- The late 9th-century BC siege system surrounding Tell es-Safi/Gath, Israel, consists of a 2.5 km (1.6 mi) long siege trench, towers, and other elements, and is the earliest evidence of a circumvallation system known in the world. It was apparently built by Hazael of Aram Damascus, as part of his siege and conquest of Philistine Gath in the late 9th century BC (mentioned in II Kings 12:18).
- The late 8th-century BC siege system surrounding the site of Lachish (Tell el-Duweir) in Israel, built by Sennacherib of Assyria in 701 BC, is not only evident in the archaeological remains, but is described in Assyrian and biblical sources and in the reliefs of Sennacherib's palace in Nineveh.
- The siege of Palaepaphos, Cyprus by the Persian army in the 4th century BC.

=== Depictions ===
The earliest representations of siege warfare have been dated to the Protodynastic Period of Egypt, c. 3000 BC. These show the symbolic destruction of city walls by divine animals using hoes.

The first siege equipment is known from Egyptian tomb reliefs of the 24th century BC, showing Egyptian soldiers storming Canaanite town walls on wheeled siege ladders. Later Egyptian temple reliefs of the 13th century BC portray the violent siege of Dapur, a Syrian city, with soldiers climbing scale ladders supported by archers.

Assyrian palace reliefs of the 9th to 7th centuries BC display sieges of several Near Eastern cities. Though a simple battering ram had come into use in the previous millennium, the Assyrians improved siege warfare and used huge wooden tower-shaped battering rams with archers positioned on top.

In ancient China, sieges of city walls (along with naval battles) were portrayed on bronze 'hu' vessels, like those found in Chengdu, Sichuan in 1965, which have been dated to the Warring States period (5th to 3rd centuries BC).

== Tactics ==
=== Offensive ===
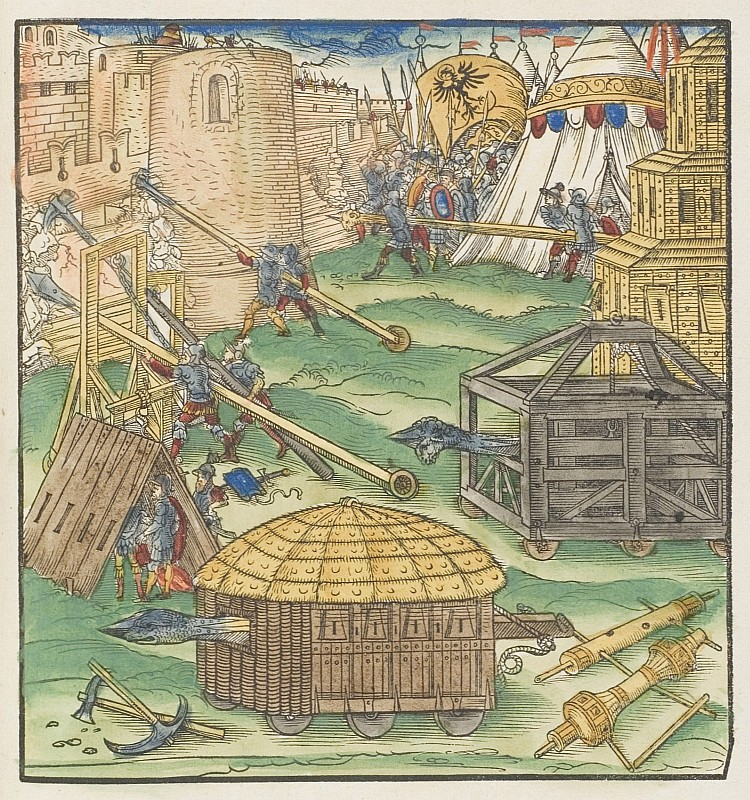
Depiction of various siege machines in the mid-16th century

An attacker's first act in a siege might be a surprise attack, attempting to overwhelm the defenders before they were ready or were even aware there was a threat. This was how William de Forz captured Fotheringhay Castle in 1221.

The most common practice of siege warfare was to lay siege and just wait for the surrender of the enemies inside or, quite commonly, to coerce someone inside to betray the fortification. During the medieval period, negotiations would frequently take place during the early part of the siege. An attacker – aware of a prolonged siege's great cost in time, money, and lives – might offer generous terms to a defender who surrendered quickly. The defending troops would be allowed to march away unharmed, often retaining their weapons. However, a garrison commander who was thought to have surrendered too quickly might face execution by his own side for treason.

As a siege progressed, the surrounding army would build earthworks (a line of circumvallation) to completely encircle their target, preventing food, water, and other supplies from reaching the besieged city. If sufficiently desperate as the siege progressed, defenders and civilians might have been reduced to eating anything vaguely edible – horses, family pets, the leather from shoes, and even each other.

The Hittite siege of a rebellious Anatolian vassal in the 14th century BC ended when the queen mother came out of the city and begged for mercy on behalf of her people. The Hittite campaign against the kingdom of Mitanni in the 14th century BC bypassed the fortified city of Carchemish. If the main objective of a campaign was not the conquest of a particular city, it could simply be passed by. When the main objective of the campaign had been fulfilled, the Hittite army returned to Carchemish and the city fell after an eight-day siege.

Disease was another effective siege weapon, although the attackers were often as vulnerable as the defenders. In some instances, catapults or similar weapons were used to fling diseased animals over city walls in an early example of biological warfare. If all else failed, a besieger could claim the booty of his conquest undamaged, and retain his men and equipment intact, for the price of a well-placed bribe to a disgruntled gatekeeper. The Assyrian siege of Jerusalem in the 8th century BC came to an end when the Israelites bought them off with gifts and tribute, according to the Assyrian account, or when the Assyrian camp was struck by mass death, according to the Biblical account. Due to logistics, long-lasting sieges involving a minor force could seldom be maintained. A besieging army, encamped in possibly squalid field conditions and dependent on the countryside and its own supply lines for food, could very well be threatened with the disease and starvation intended for the besieged.

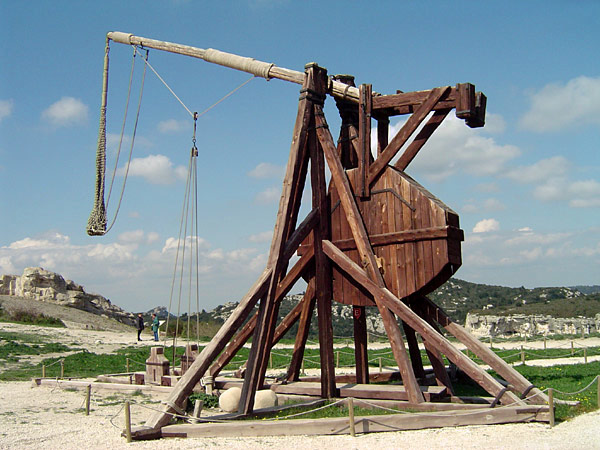
Medieval trebuchets could sling about two projectiles per hour at enemy positions.

To end a siege more rapidly, various methods were developed in ancient and medieval times to counter fortifications, and a large variety of siege engines was developed for use by besieging armies. Ladders could be used to escalade over the defenses. Battering rams and siege hooks could also be used to force through gates or walls, while catapults, ballistae, trebuchets, mangonels, and onagers could be used to launch projectiles to break down a city's fortifications and kill its defenders. A siege tower, a substantial structure built to equal or greater height than the fortification's walls, could allow the attackers to fire down upon the defenders and also advance troops to the wall with less danger than using ladders.

In addition to launching projectiles at the fortifications or defenders, it was also quite common to attempt to undermine the fortifications, causing them to collapse. This could be accomplished by digging a tunnel beneath the foundations of the walls, and then deliberately collapsing or exploding the tunnel. This process is known as mining. The defenders could dig counter-tunnels to cut into the attackers' works and collapse them prematurely.

Fire was often used as a weapon when dealing with wooden fortifications. The Roman Empire used Greek fire, which contained additives that made it hard to extinguish. Combined with a primitive flamethrower, it proved an effective offensive and defensive weapon. A sallying out might also occur with such weapons, or if the siege was of a location on a coastline, from ships launched from the harbor of the location.

=== Defensive ===
The universal method for defending against siege is the use of fortifications, principally walls and ditches, to supplement natural features. A sufficient supply of food and water was also important to defeat the simplest method of siege warfare: starvation. On occasion, the defenders would drive 'surplus' civilians out to reduce the demands on stored food and water.

During the Warring States period in China (481–221 BC), warfare lost its honorable, gentlemen's duty that was found in the previous era of the Spring and Autumn period, and became more practical, competitive, cut-throat, and efficient for gaining victory. The Chinese invention of the hand-held, trigger-mechanism crossbow during this period revolutionized warfare, giving greater emphasis to infantry and cavalry and less to traditional chariot warfare.

The philosophically pacifist Mohists (followers of the philosopher Mozi) of the 5th century BC believed in aiding the defensive warfare of smaller Chinese states against the hostile offensive warfare of larger domineering states. The Mohists were renowned in the smaller states (and the enemies of the larger states) for the inventions of siege machinery to scale or destroy walls. These included traction trebuchet catapults, 8-foot (2.4 m) high ballistas, a wheeled siege ramp with grappling hooks known as the Cloud Bridge (the protractible, folded ramp slinging forward by means of a counterweight with rope and pulley), and wheeled 'hook-carts' used to latch large iron hooks onto the tops of walls to pull them down.

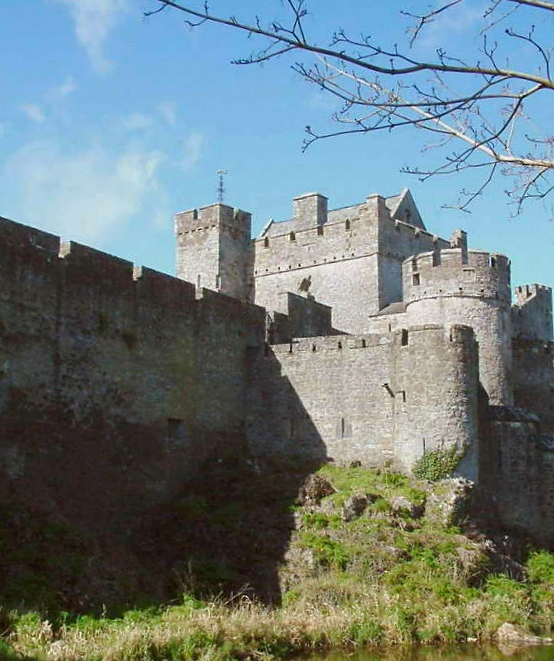
Cahir Castle in Ireland was besieged and captured three times: in 1599 by the Earl of Essex, in 1647 by Lord Inchiquin, and in 1650 by Oliver Cromwell.

When enemies attempted to dig tunnels under walls for mining or entry into the city, the defenders used large bellows (the type the Chinese commonly used in heating up a blast furnace for smelting cast iron) to pump smoke into the tunnels in order to suffocate the intruders.

Advances in the prosecution of sieges in ancient and medieval times naturally encouraged the development of a variety of defensive countermeasures. In particular, medieval fortifications became progressively stronger—for example, the advent of the concentric castle from the period of the Crusades—and more dangerous to attackers—witness the increasing use of machicolations and murder-holes, as well the preparation of hot or incendiary substances. Arrowslits (also called arrow loops or loopholes), sally ports (airlock-like doors) for sallies and deep water wells were also integral means of resisting siege at this time. Particular attention would be paid to defending entrances, with gates protected by drawbridges, portcullises, and barbicans. Moats and other water defenses, whether natural or augmented, were also vital to the defenders.

In the European Middle Ages, virtually all large cities had city walls—Dubrovnik in Dalmatia is a well-preserved example—and more important cities had citadels, forts, or castles. Great effort was expended to ensure a good water supply inside the city in case of siege. In some cases, long tunnels were constructed to carry water into the city. Complex systems of tunnels were used for storage and communications in medieval cities like Tábor in Bohemia, similar to those used much later in Vietnam during the Vietnam War.

Until the invention of gunpowder-based weapons (and the resulting higher-velocity projectiles), the balance of power and logistics definitely favored the defender. With the invention of gunpowder, cannon and mortars and howitzers (in modern times), the traditional methods of defense became less effective against a determined siege.

=== Siege accounts ===
Although there are numerous ancient accounts of cities being sacked, few contain any clues to how this was achieved. Some popular tales existed on how the cunning heroes succeeded in their sieges. The best-known is the Trojan Horse of the Trojan War, and a similar story tells how the Canaanite city of Joppa was conquered by the Egyptians in the 15th century BC. The Biblical Book of Joshua contains the story of the miraculous Battle of Jericho.

A more detailed historical account from the 8th century BC, called the Piankhi stela, records how the Nubians laid siege to and conquered several Egyptian cities by using battering rams, archers, and slingers and building causeways across moats.

== Classical antiquity ==
During the Peloponnesian War, one hundred sieges were attempted and fifty-eight ended with the surrender of the besieged area.

Alexander the Great's army successfully besieged many powerful cities during his conquests. Two of his most impressive achievements in siegecraft took place in the siege of Tyre and the siege of the Sogdian Rock. His engineers built a causeway that was originally 60 m (200 ft) wide and reached the range of his torsion-powered artillery, while his soldiers pushed siege towers housing stone throwers and light catapults to bombard the city walls.

Most conquerors before him had found Tyre, a Phoenician island-city about 1 km (1,100 yd) from the mainland, impregnable. The Macedonians built a mole, a raised spit of earth across the water, by piling stones up on a natural land bridge that extended underwater to the island, and although the Tyrians rallied by sending a fire ship to destroy the towers, and captured the mole in a swarming frenzy, the city eventually fell to the Macedonians after a seven-month siege. In complete contrast to Tyre, Sogdian Rock was captured by stealthy attack. Alexander used commando-like tactics to scale the cliffs and capture the high ground, and the demoralized defenders surrendered.

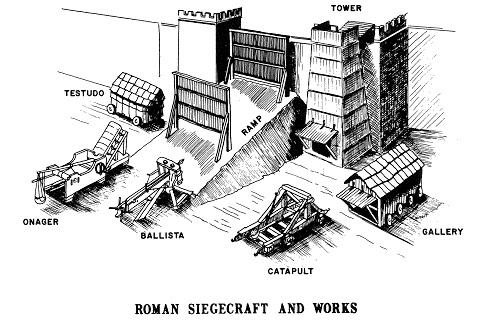
Roman siege machines

The importance of siege warfare in the ancient period should not be underestimated. One of the contributing causes of Hannibal's inability to defeat Rome was his lack of siege engines, thus, while he was able to defeat Roman armies in the field, he was unable to capture Rome itself. The legionary armies of the Roman Republic and Empire are noted as being particularly skilled and determined in siege warfare. An astonishing number and variety of sieges, for example, formed the core of Julius Caesar's mid-1st-century BC conquest of Gaul (modern France).

In his Commentarii de Bello Gallico (Commentaries on the Gallic War), Caesar describes how, at the Battle of Alesia, the Roman legions created two huge fortified walls around the city. The inner circumvallation, 16 km (10 mi), held in Vercingetorix's forces, while the outer contravallation kept relief from reaching them. The Romans held the ground in between the two walls. The besieged Gauls, facing starvation, eventually surrendered after their relief force met defeat against Caesar's auxiliary cavalry.

The Sicarii Zealots who defended Masada in AD 73 were defeated by the Roman legions, who built a ramp 100 metres (330 ft) high up to the fortress's west wall.

During the Roman–Persian Wars, siege warfare was extensively used by both sides.

== Medieval period ==
=== Mongols and Chinese ===
In the Middle Ages, the Mongol Empire's campaign against China (then comprising the Western Xia dynasty, Jin dynasty, and Southern Song dynasty) by Genghis Khan until Kublai Khan, who eventually established the Yuan dynasty in 1271, was very effective, allowing the Mongols to sweep through large areas. Even if they could not enter some of the more well-fortified cities, they used innovative battle tactics to grab hold of the land and the people:

By concentrating on the field armies, the strongholds had to wait. Of course, smaller fortresses, or ones easily surprised, were taken as they came along. This had two effects. First, it cut off the principal city from communicating with other cities where they might expect aid. Secondly, refugees from these smaller cities would flee to the last stronghold. The reports from these cities and the streaming hordes of refugees not only reduced the morale of the inhabitants and garrison of the principal city, it also strained their resources. Food and water reserves were taxed by the sudden influx of refugees. Soon, what was once a formidable undertaking became easy. The Mongols were then free to lay siege without interference of the field army, as it had been destroyed. At the siege of Aleppo, Hulagu used twenty catapults against the Bab al-Iraq (Gate of Iraq) alone.

In Jûzjânî, there are several episodes in which the Mongols constructed hundreds of siege machines in order to surpass the number which the defending city possessed. While Jûzjânî surely exaggerated, the improbably high numbers which he used for both the Mongols and the defenders do give one a sense of the large numbers of machines used at a single siege.

Another Mongol tactic was to use catapults to launch corpses of plague victims into besieged cities. The disease-carrying fleas from the bodies would then infest the city, and the plague would spread, allowing the city to be easily captured, although this transmission mechanism was not known at the time. In 1346, the bodies of Mongol warriors of the Golden Horde who had died of plague were thrown over the walls of the Crimean city of Kaffa (now Feodosiya) during the siege of Caffa. It has been speculated that this operation may have been responsible for the advent of the Black Death in Europe. The Black Death is estimated to have killed 30%–60% of Europe's population.

On the first night while laying siege to a city, the leader of the Mongol forces would lead from a white tent: if the city surrendered, all would be spared. On the second day, he would use a red tent: if the city surrendered, the men would all be killed, but the rest would be spared. On the third day, he would use a black tent: no quarter would be given.

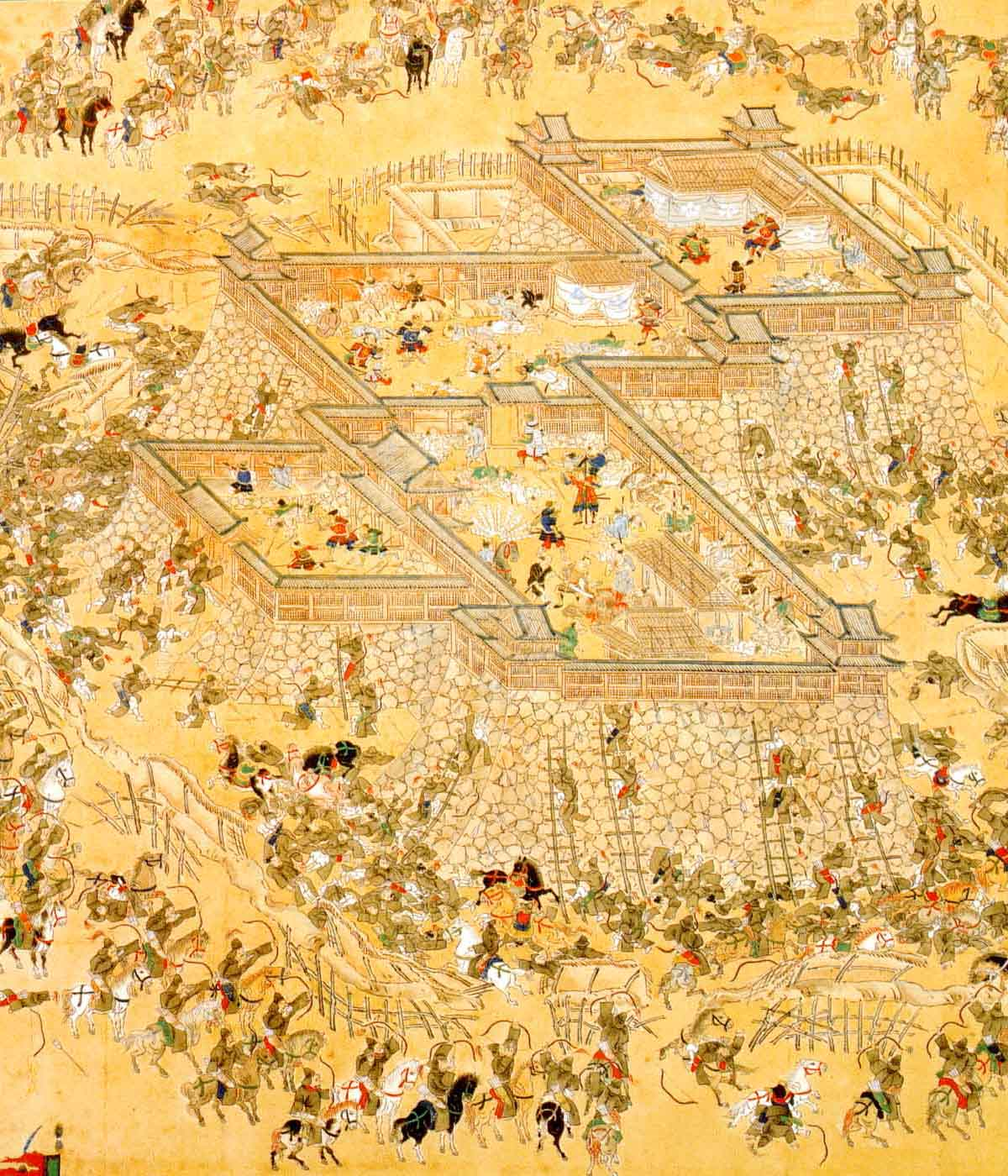
Chinese and Korean troops assault the Japanese forces of Hideyoshi in the siege of Ulsan during the Imjin War (1592–1598).

However, the Chinese were not completely defenseless, and from AD 1234 until 1279, the Southern Song Chinese held out against the enormous barrage of Mongol attacks. Much of this success in defense lay in the world's first use of gunpowder (i.e. with early flamethrowers, grenades, firearms, cannons, and land mines) to fight back against the Khitans, the Tanguts, the Jurchens, and then the Mongols.

The Chinese of the Song period also discovered the explosive potential of packing hollowed cannonball shells with gunpowder. Written later c. 1350 in the Huo Long Jing, this manuscript of Jiao Yu recorded an earlier Song-era cast-iron cannon known as the 'flying-cloud thunderclap eruptor' (fei yun pi-li pao). The manuscript stated that (Wade–Giles spelling):

The shells (phao) are made of cast iron, as large as a bowl and shaped like a ball. Inside they contain half a pound of 'magic' gunpowder (shen huo). They are sent flying towards the enemy camp from an eruptor (mu phao); and when they get there a sound like a thunder-clap is heard, and flashes of light appear. If ten of these shells are fired successfully into the enemy camp, the whole place will be set ablaze...

During the Ming dynasty (AD 1368–1644), the Chinese were very concerned with city planning in regards to gunpowder warfare. The site for constructing the walls and the thickness of the walls in Beijing's Forbidden City were favoured by the Chinese Yongle Emperor (r. 1402–1424) because they were in pristine position to resist cannon volley and were built thick enough to withstand attacks from cannon fire.

For more, see Technology of the Song dynasty.

== Age of gunpowder ==
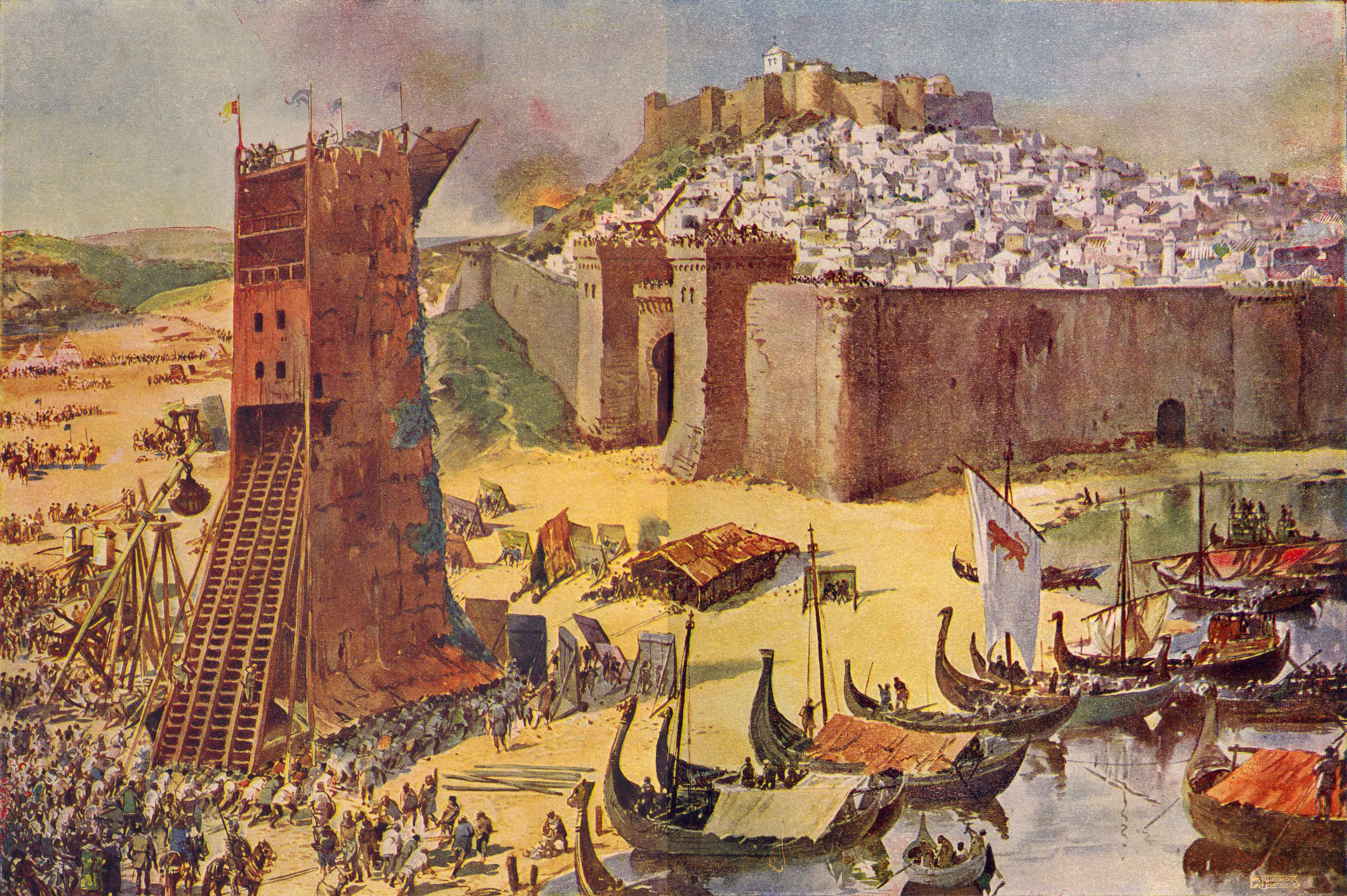
Depiction of the 1147 siege of Lisbon, painting by Alfredo Roque Gameiro, 1917

The introduction of gunpowder and the use of cannons brought about a new age in siege warfare. Cannons were first used in Song dynasty China during the early 13th century, but did not become significant weapons for another 150 years or so. In early decades, cannons were ineffective against strong castles and fortresses, providing little more than smoke and fire. By the 16th century, however, they were an essential and regularized part of any campaigning army, or castle's defences.

The greatest advantage of cannons over other siege weapons was the ability to fire a heavier projectile, farther, faster, and more often than previous weapons. They could also fire projectiles in a straight line, so that they could destroy the bases of high walls. Thus, 'old fashioned' walls – that is, high and, relatively, thin – were excellent targets, and, over time, easily demolished. In 1453, the Theodosian Walls of Constantinople, the capital of the Roman Empire, were broken through in just six weeks by the 62 cannons of Mehmed II's army, although in the end the conquest was a long and extremely difficult siege with heavy Ottoman casualties due to the repeated attempts at taking the city by assault.

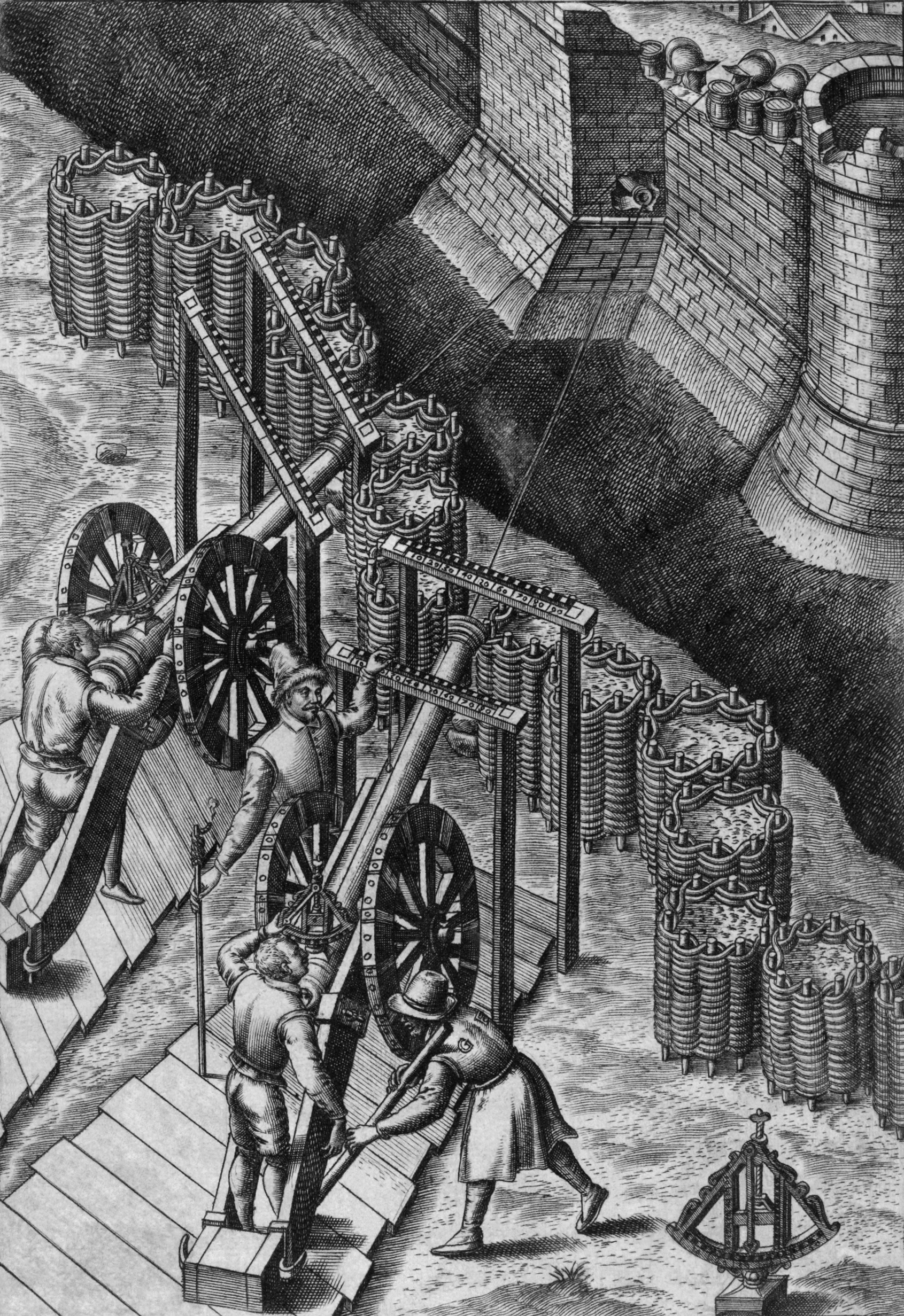
Late 16th-century illustration of cannon with gabions

However, new fortifications, designed to withstand gunpowder weapons, were soon constructed throughout Europe. During the Renaissance and the early modern period, siege warfare continued to dominate the conduct of the European wars.

Once siege guns were developed, the techniques for assaulting a town or fortress became well known and ritualized. The attacking army would surround a town. Then the town would be asked to surrender. If they did not comply, the besieging army would surround the town with temporary fortifications to stop sallies from the stronghold or relief getting in. The attackers would next build a length of trenches parallel to the defenses (these are known as the "first parallel") and just out of range of the defending artillery. They would dig a trench (known as a forward) towards the town in a zigzag pattern so that it could not be enfiladed by defending fire. Once they were within artillery range, they would dig another parallel (the "second parallel") trench and fortify it with gun emplacements. This technique is commonly called entrenchment.

If necessary, using the first artillery fire for cover, the forces conducting the siege would repeat the process until they placed their guns close enough to be laid (aimed) accurately to make a breach in the fortifications. In order to allow the forlorn hope and support troops to get close enough to exploit the breach, more zigzag trenches could be dug even closer to the walls, with more parallel trenches to protect and conceal the attacking troops. After each step in the process, the besiegers would ask the besieged to surrender. If the forlorn hope stormed the breach successfully, the defenders could expect no mercy.

=== Emerging theories ===
The castles that in earlier years had been formidable obstacles were easily breached by the new weapons. For example, in Spain, the newly equipped army of Ferdinand and Isabella was able to conquer Moorish strongholds in Granada in 1482–1492 that had held out for centuries before the invention of cannons.

In the early 15th century, Italian architect Leon Battista Alberti wrote a treatise entitled De Re aedificatoria, which theorized methods of building fortifications capable of withstanding the new guns. He proposed that walls be "built in uneven lines, like the teeth of a saw". He proposed star-shaped fortresses with low, thick walls.

However, few rulers paid any attention to his theories. A few towns in Italy began building in the new style late in the 1480s, but it was only with the French invasion of the Italian peninsula in 1494–1495 that the new fortifications were built on a large scale. Charles VIII invaded Italy with an army of 18,000 men and a horse-drawn siege-train. As a result, he could defeat virtually any city or state, no matter how well defended. In a panic, military strategy was completely rethought throughout the Italian states of the time, with a strong emphasis on the new fortifications that could withstand a modern siege.

=== New fortresses ===
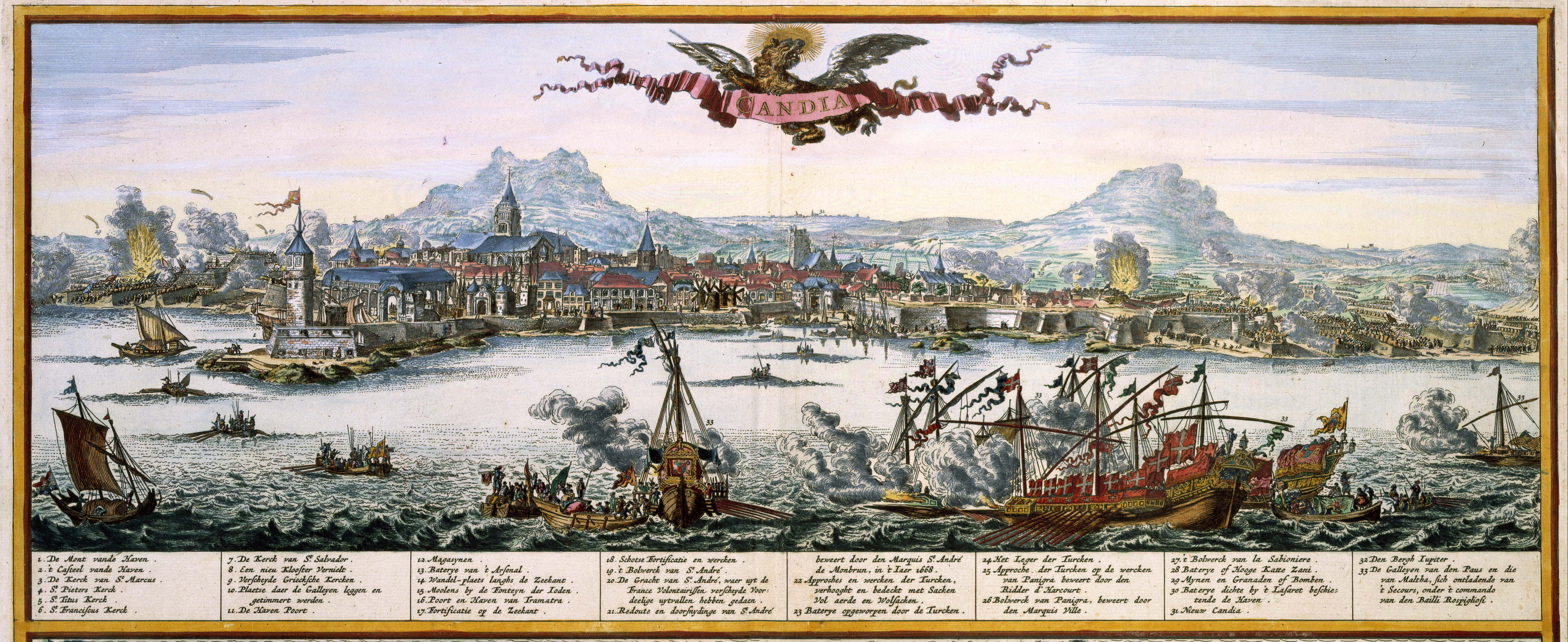
The siege of Candia, regarded as one of the longest sieges in history (1648–1669)

The most effective way to protect walls against cannon fire proved to be depth (increasing the width of the defenses) and angles (ensuring that attackers could only fire on walls at an oblique angle, not square on). Initially, walls were lowered and backed, in front and behind, with earth. Towers were reformed into triangular bastions. This design matured into the trace italienne. Star-shaped fortresses surrounding towns and even cities with outlying defenses proved very difficult to capture, even for a well-equipped army. Fortresses built in this style throughout the 16th century did not become fully obsolete until the 19th century, and were still in use throughout World War I (though modified for 20th-century warfare). During World War II, trace italienne fortresses could still present a formidable challenge, for example, in the last days of World War II, during the Battle in Berlin, that saw some of the heaviest urban fighting of the war, the Soviets did not attempt to storm the Spandau Citadel (built between 1559 and 1594), but chose to invest it and negotiate its surrender.

However, the cost of building such vast modern fortifications was incredibly high, and was often too much for individual cities to undertake. Many were bankrupted in the process of building them; others, such as Siena, spent so much money on fortifications that they were unable to maintain their armies properly, and so lost their wars anyway. Nonetheless, innumerable large and impressive fortresses were built throughout northern Italy in the first decades of the 16th century to resist repeated French invasions that became known as the Italian Wars. Many stand to this day.

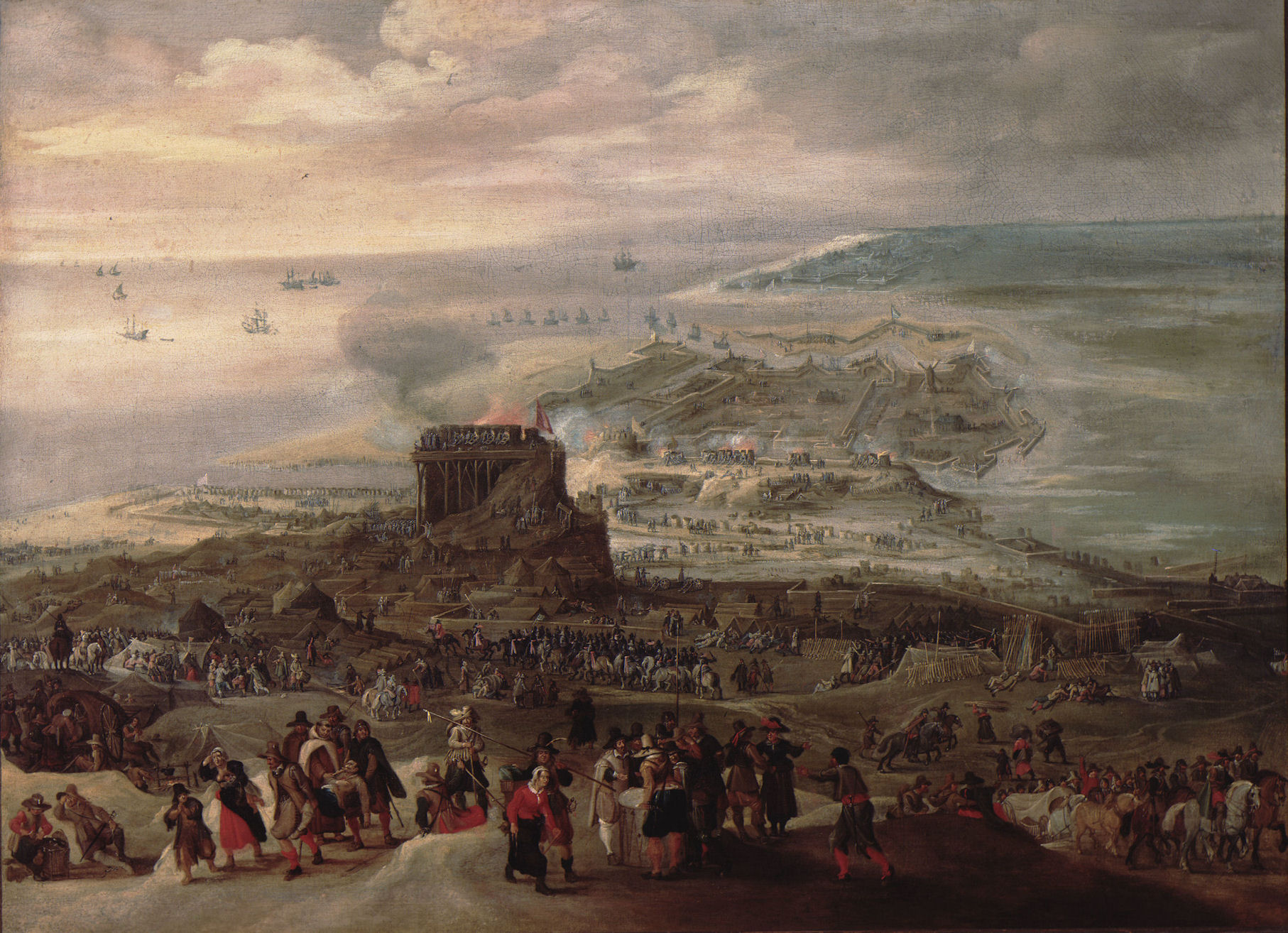
The Siege of Ostend during the Eighty Years' War, 1601–1604

In the 1530s and 1540s, the new style of fortification began to spread out of Italy into the rest of Europe, particularly to France, the Netherlands, and Spain. Italian engineers were in enormous demand throughout Europe, especially in war-torn areas such as the Netherlands, which became dotted by towns encircled in modern fortifications. The densely populated areas of Northern Italy and the United Provinces (the Netherlands) were infamous for their high degree of fortification of cities. It made campaigns in these areas very hard to successfully conduct, considering even minor cities had to be captured by siege within the span of the campaigning season. In the Dutch case, the possibility of flooding large parts of the land provided an additional obstacle to besiegers, for example at the siege of Leiden. For many years, defensive and offensive tactics were well balanced, leading to protracted and costly wars such as Europe had never known, involving more and more planning and government involvement. The new fortresses ensured that war rarely extended beyond a series of sieges. Because the new fortresses could easily hold 10,000 men, an attacking army could not ignore a powerfully fortified position without serious risk of counterattack. As a result, virtually all towns had to be taken, and that was usually a long, drawn-out affair, potentially lasting from several months to years, while the members of the town were starved to death. Most battles in this period were between besieging armies and relief columns sent to rescue the besieged.

=== Marshal Vauban and Van Coehoorn ===
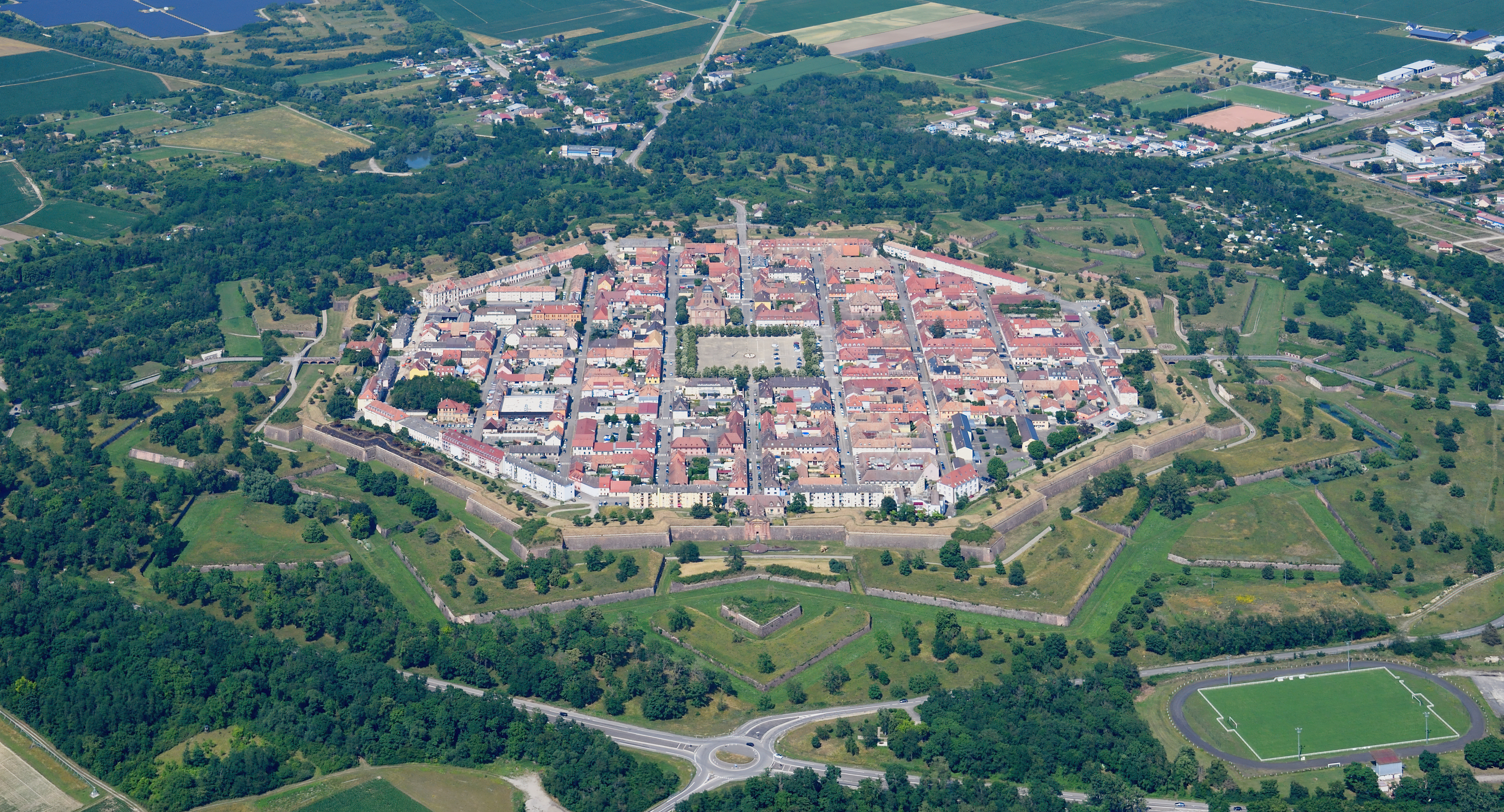
Vauban's star-shaped fortified city of Neuf-Brisach

At the end of the 17th century, two influential military engineers, the French Marshal Vauban and the Dutch military engineer Menno van Coehoorn, developed modern fortification to its pinnacle, refining siege warfare without fundamentally altering it: ditches would be dug; walls would be protected by glacis; and bastions would enfilade an attacker. Both engineers developed their ideas independently, but came to similar general rules regarding defensive construction and offensive action against fortifications. Both were skilled in conducting sieges and defenses themselves. Before Vauban and Van Coehoorn, sieges had been somewhat slapdash operations. Vauban and Van Coehoorn refined besieging to a science with a methodical process that, if uninterrupted, would break even the strongest fortifications. Examples of their styles of fortifications are Arras (Vauban) and the no-longer-existent fortress of Bergen op Zoom (Van Coehoorn). The main differences between the two lay in the difference in terrain on which Vauban and Van Coehoorn constructed their defenses: Vauban in the sometimes more hilly and mountainous terrain of France, Van Coehoorn in the flat and floodable lowlands of the Netherlands.

Planning and maintaining a siege is just as difficult as fending one off. A besieging army must be prepared to repel both sorties from the besieged area and also any attack that may try to relieve the defenders. It was thus usual to construct lines of trenches and defenses facing in both directions. The outermost lines, known as the lines of contravallation, would surround the entire besieging army and protect it from attackers.

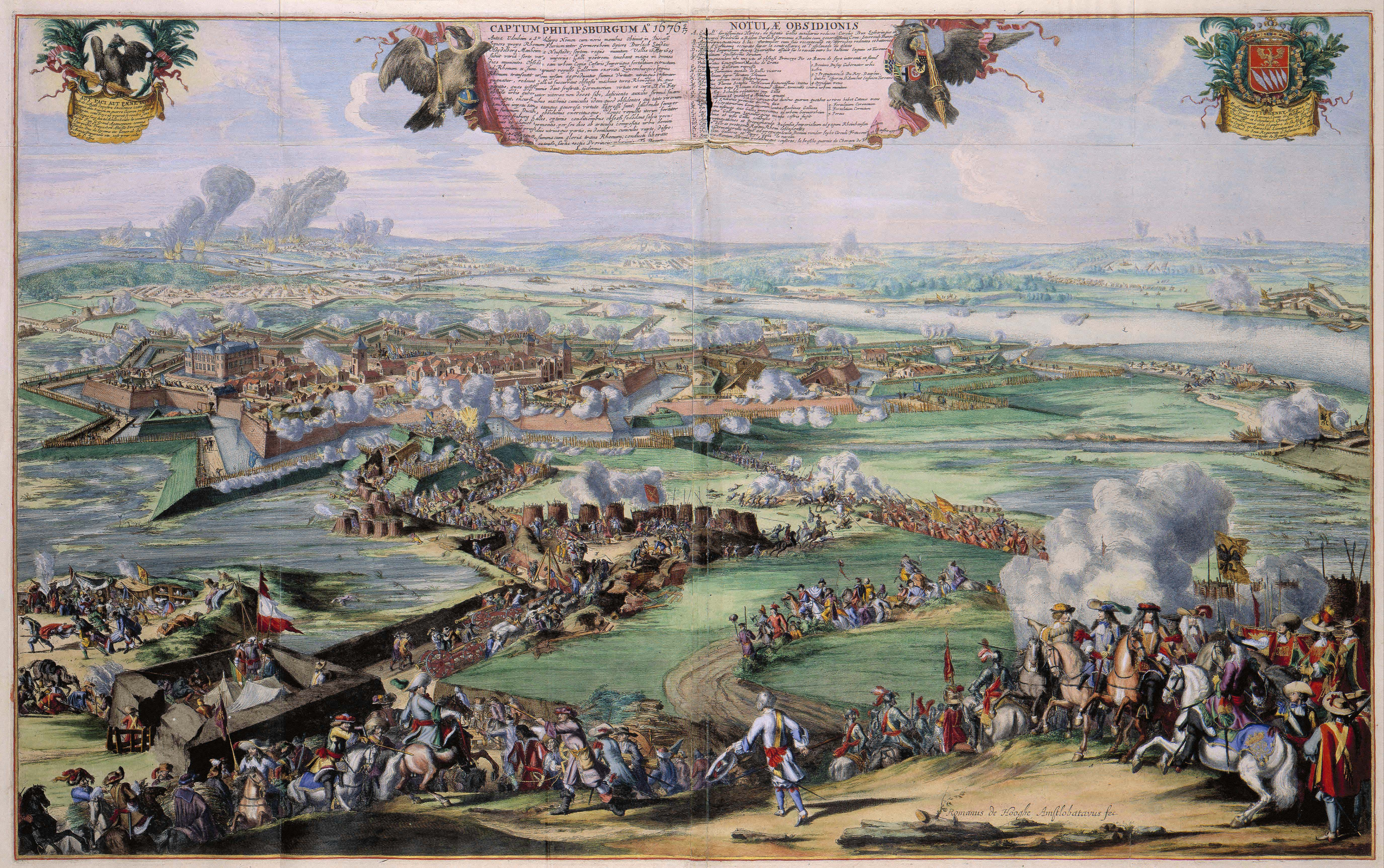
The Siege of Philippsburg during the Franco-Dutch War, 1676

This would be the first construction effort of a besieging army, built soon after a fortress or city had been invested. A line of circumvallation would also be constructed, facing in towards the besieged area, to protect against sorties by the defenders and to prevent the besieged from escaping. The next line, which Vauban usually placed at about 600 metres (2,000 ft) from the target, would contain the main batteries of heavy cannons so that they could hit the target without being vulnerable themselves. Once this line was established, work crews would move forward, creating another line at 250 metres (1,000 ft). This line contained smaller guns. The final line would be constructed only 30 to 60 metres (100 to 200 ft) from the fortress. This line would contain the mortars and would act as a staging area for attack parties once the walls were breached. Van Coehoorn developed a small and easily movable mortar named the coehorn, variations of which were used in sieges until the 19th century. It would also be from this line that miners working to undermine the fortress would operate.

The trenches connecting the various lines of the besiegers could not be built perpendicular to the walls of the fortress, as the defenders would have a clear line of fire along the whole trench. Thus, these lines (known as saps) needed to be sharply jagged.

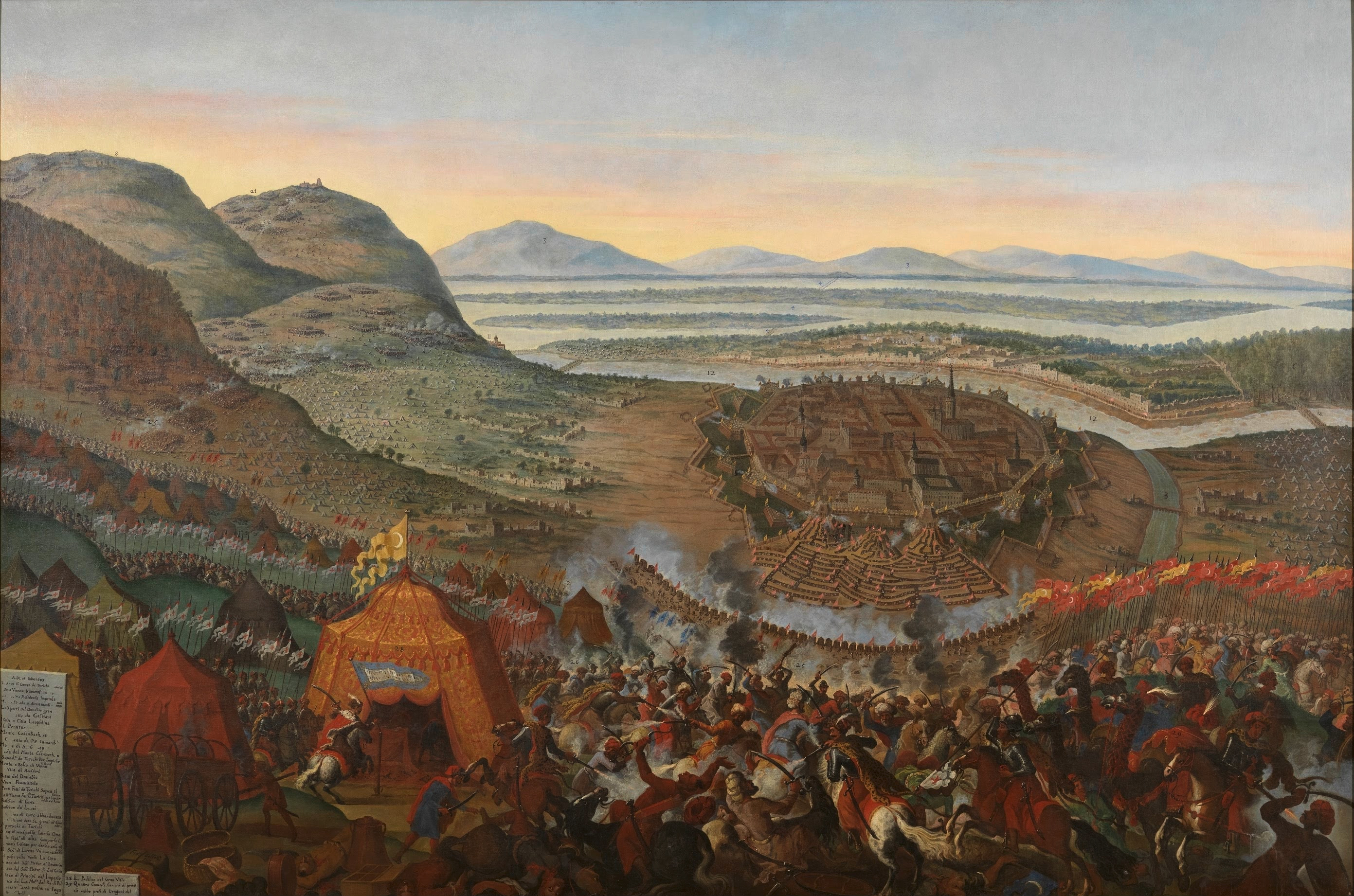
The Battle of Vienna took place in 1683 after Vienna had been besieged by the Ottoman Empire for two months.

Another element of a fortress was the citadel. Usually, a citadel was a "mini fortress" within the larger fortress, sometimes designed as a reduit, but more often as a means of protecting the garrison from potential revolt in the city. The citadel was used in wartime and peacetime to keep the residents of the city in line.

As in ages past, most sieges were decided with very little fighting between the opposing armies. An attacker's army was poorly served, incurring the high casualties that a direct assault on a fortress would entail. Usually, they would wait until supplies inside the fortifications were exhausted or disease had weakened the defenders to the point that they were willing to surrender. At the same time, diseases, especially typhus, were a constant danger to the encamped armies outside the fortress, and often forced a premature retreat. Sieges were often won by the army that lasted the longest.

An important element of strategy for the besieging army was whether or not to allow the encamped city to surrender. Usually, it was preferable to graciously allow a surrender, both to save on casualties, and to set an example for future defending cities. A city that was allowed to surrender with minimal loss of life was much better off than a city that held out for a long time and was brutally butchered at the end. Moreover, if an attacking army had a reputation of killing and pillaging regardless of a surrender, then other cities' defensive efforts would be redoubled. Usually, a city would surrender (with no honour lost) when its inner lines of defense were reached by the attacker. In case of refusal, however, the inner lines would have to be stormed by the attacker and the attacking troops would be seen to be justified in sacking the city.

=== Siege warfare ===
Siege warfare dominated in Western Europe for most of the 17th and 18th centuries. An entire campaign, or longer, could be used in a single siege (for example, Ostend in 1601–1604; La Rochelle in 1627–1628). This resulted in extremely prolonged conflicts. The balance was that, while siege warfare was extremely expensive and very slow, it was very successful—or, at least, more so than encounters in the field. Battles arose through clashes between besiegers and relieving armies, but the principle was a slow, grinding victory by the greater economic power. The relatively rare attempts at forcing pitched battles (Gustavus Adolphus in 1630; the French against the Dutch in 1672 or 1688) were almost always expensive failures.

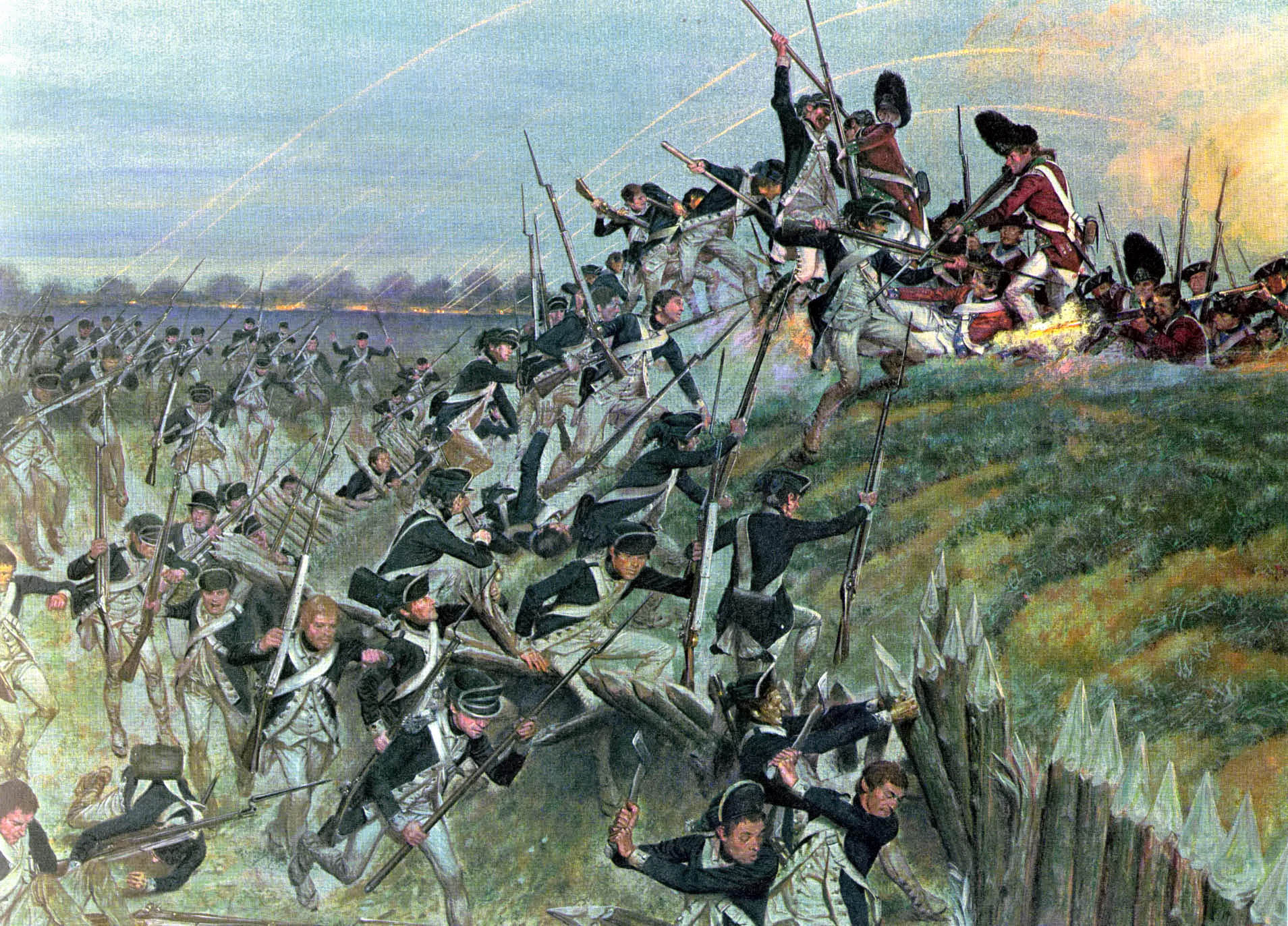
Storming of redoubt #10 during the siege of Yorktown

The exception to this rule were the English. During the English Civil War, anything which tended to prolong the struggle, or seemed like want of energy and avoidance of a decision, was bitterly resented by the men of both sides. In France and Germany, the prolongation of a war meant continued employment for the soldiers, but in England, both sides were looking to end the war quickly. Even when in the end the New Model Army—a regular professional army—developed the original decision-compelling spirit permeated the whole organisation, as was seen when pitched against regular professional continental troops the Battle of the Dunes during the Interregnum.

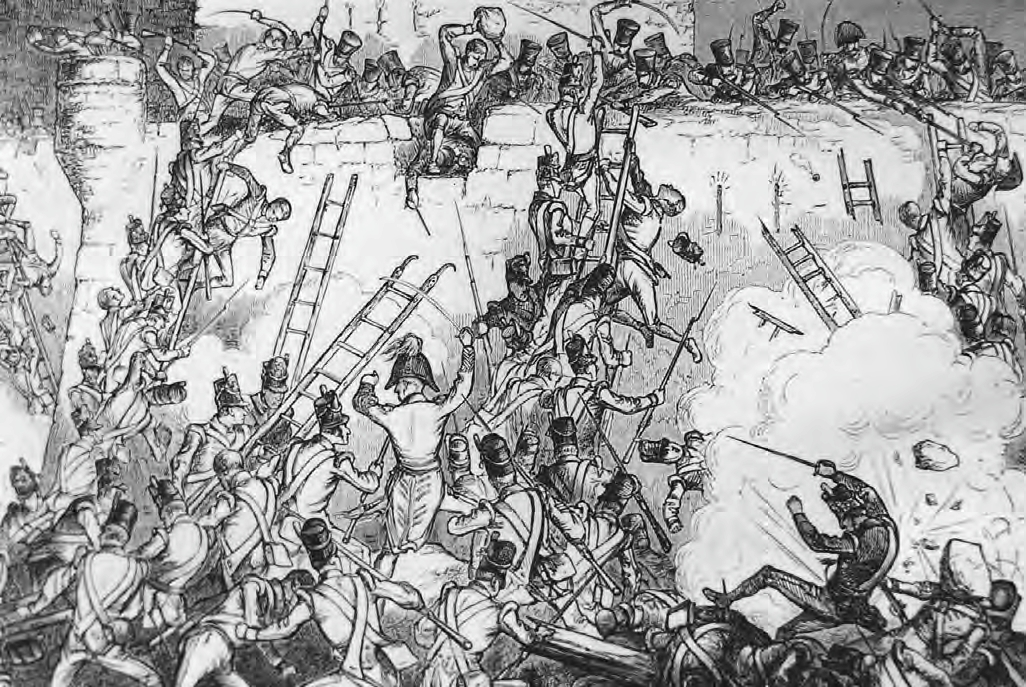
British infantry attempt to scale the walls of Badajoz, Peninsular War, 1812

Experienced commanders on both sides in the English Civil War recommended the abandonment of garrisoned fortifications for two primary reasons. The first, as for example proposed by the Royalist Sir Richard Willis to King Charles, was that by abandoning the garrisoning of all but the most strategic locations in one's own territory, far more troops would be available for the field armies, and it was the field armies which would decide the conflict. The other argument was that by slighting potential strong points in one's own territory, an enemy expeditionary force, or local enemy rising, would find it more difficult to consolidate territorial gains against an inevitable counterattack. Sir John Meldrum put forward just such an argument to the Parliamentary Committee of Both Kingdoms, to justify his slighting of Gainsborough in Lincolnshire.

Sixty years later, during the War of the Spanish Succession, the Duke of Marlborough preferred to engage the enemy in pitched battles, rather than engage in siege warfare, although he was very proficient in both types of warfare.

On 15 April 1746, the day before the Battle of Culloden, at Dunrobin Castle, a party of William Sutherland's militia conducted the last siege fought on the mainland of Great Britain against Jacobite members of Clan MacLeod.

==== Strategic concepts ====
In the French Revolutionary and Napoleonic Wars, new techniques stressed the division of armies into all-arms corps that would march separately and only come together on the battlefield. The less-concentrated army could now live off the country and move more rapidly over a larger number of roads.

Fortresses commanding lines of communication could be bypassed and would no longer stop an invasion. Since armies could not live off the land indefinitely, Napoleon Bonaparte always sought a quick end to any conflict by pitched battle. This military revolution was described and codified by Clausewitz.

==== Industrial advances ====
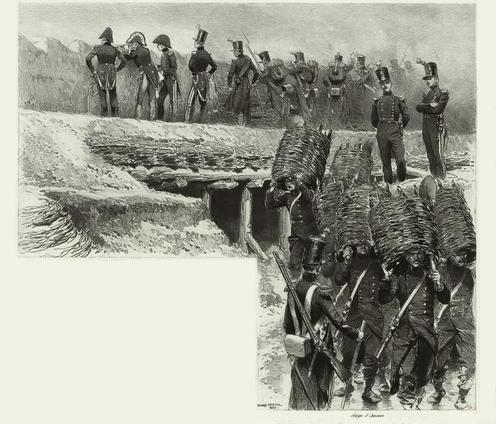
French Engineer Corps during the siege of Antwerp, 1832

Advances in artillery made previously impregnable defenses useless. For example, the walls of Vienna that had held off the Turks in the mid-17th century were no obstacle to Napoleon in the early 19th.

Where sieges occurred (such as the siege of Delhi and the siege of Cawnpore during the Indian Rebellion of 1857), the attackers were usually able to defeat the defenses within a matter of days or weeks, rather than weeks or months as previously. The great Swedish white-elephant fortress of Karlsborg was built in the tradition of Vauban and intended as a reserve capital for Sweden, but it was obsolete before it was completed in 1869.

Railways, when they were introduced, made possible the movement and supply of larger armies than those that fought in the Napoleonic Wars. It also reintroduced siege warfare, as armies seeking to use railway lines in enemy territory were forced to capture fortresses which blocked these lines.

During the Franco-Prussian War, the battlefield front lines moved rapidly through France. However, the Prussian and other German armies were delayed for months at the siege of Metz and the siege of Paris, due to the greatly increased firepower of the defending infantry, and the principle of detached or semi-detached forts with heavy-caliber artillery. This resulted in the later construction of fortress works across Europe, such as the massive fortifications at Verdun. It also led to the introduction of tactics which sought to induce surrender by bombarding the civilian population within a fortress, rather than the defending works themselves.

The siege of Sevastopol during the Crimean War and the siege of Petersburg (1864–1865) during the American Civil War showed that modern citadels, when improved by improvised defences, could still resist an enemy for many months. The siege of Plevna during the Russo-Turkish War (1877–1878) proved that hastily constructed field defenses could resist attacks prepared without proper resources, and were a portent of the trench warfare of World War I.

Advances in firearms technology without the necessary advances in battlefield communications gradually led to the defense again gaining the ascendancy. An example of siege during this time, prolonged during 337 days due to the isolation of the surrounded troops, was the siege of Baler, in which a reduced group of Spanish soldiers was besieged in a small church by the Philippine rebels in the course of the Philippine Revolution and the Spanish–American War, until months after the Treaty of Paris, the end of the conflict.

Furthermore, the development of steamships availed greater speed to blockade runners, ships with the purpose of bringing cargo, e.g. food, to cities under blockade, as with Charleston, South Carolina, during the American Civil War.

== Modern warfare ==
=== World War I ===
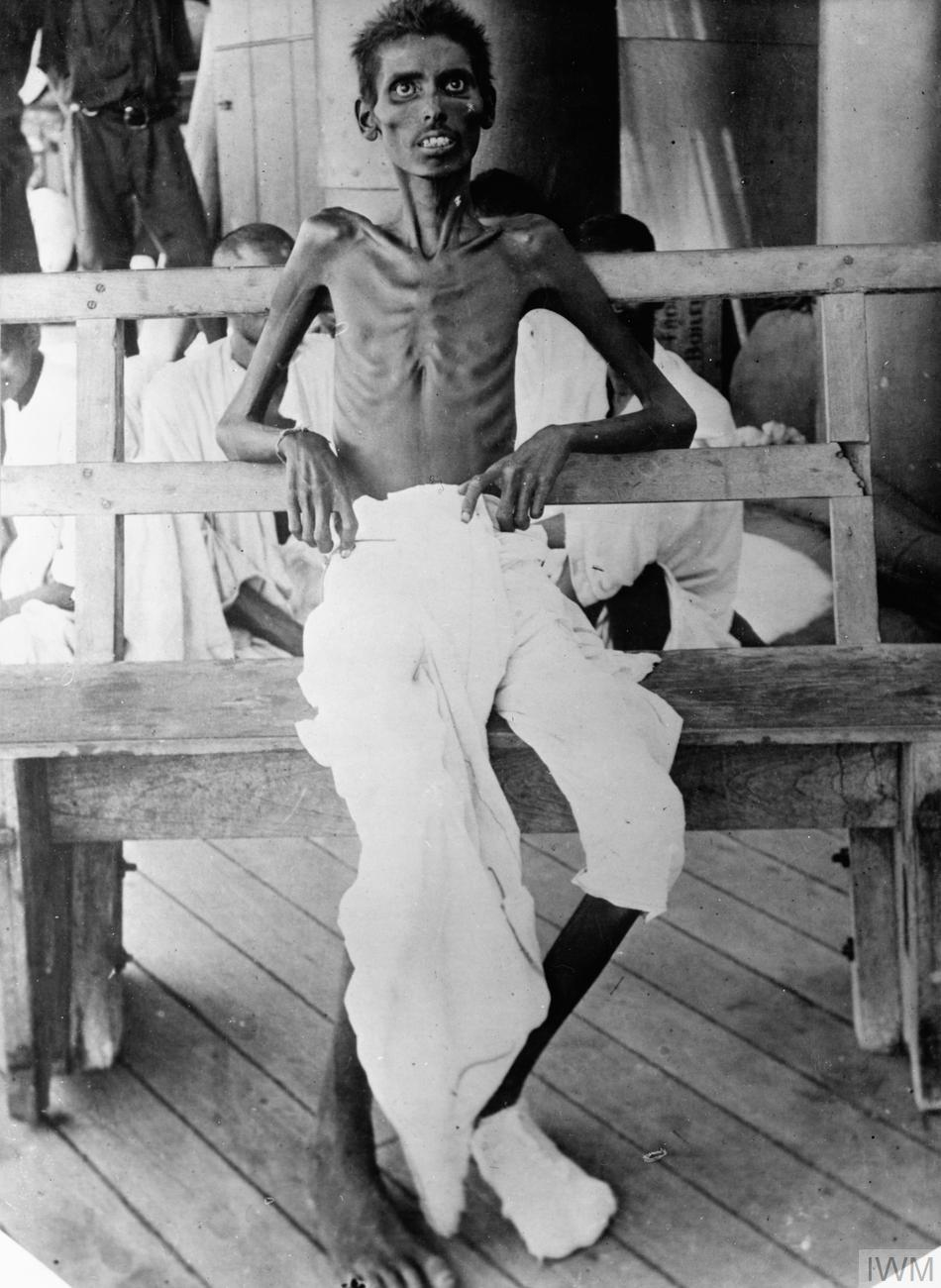
This sepoy PoW shows the conditions of the garrison at Kut at the end of the siege in World War I.

Mainly as a result of the increasing firepower (such as machine guns) available to defensive forces, First World War trench warfare briefly revived a form of siege warfare. Although siege warfare had moved out from an urban setting because city walls had become ineffective against modern weapons, trench warfare was nonetheless able to use many of the techniques of siege warfare in its prosecution (sapping, mining, barrage and, of course, attrition), but on a much larger scale and on a greatly extended front.

More traditional sieges of fortifications took place in addition to trench sieges. The siege of Tsingtao was one of the first major sieges of the war, but the inability for significant resupply of the German garrison made it a relatively one-sided battle. The Germans and the crew of an Austro-Hungarian protected cruiser put up a hopeless defense and, after holding out for more than a week, surrendered to the Japanese, forcing the German East Asia Squadron to steam towards South America for a new coal source.

The other major siege outside Europe during the First World War was in Mesopotamia, at the siege of Kut. After a failed attempt to move on Baghdad, stopped by the Ottomans at the bloody Battle of Ctesiphon, the British and their large contingent of Indian sepoy soldiers were forced to retreat to Kut, where the Ottomans under German General Baron Colmar von der Goltz laid siege. The British attempts to resupply the force via the Tigris river failed, and rationing was complicated by the refusal of many Indian troops to eat cattle products. By the time the garrison fell on 29 April 1916, starvation was rampant. Conditions did not improve greatly under Turkish imprisonment. Along with the battles of Tanga, Sandfontein, Gallipoli, and Namacurra, it would be one of Britain's numerous embarrassing colonial defeats of the war.

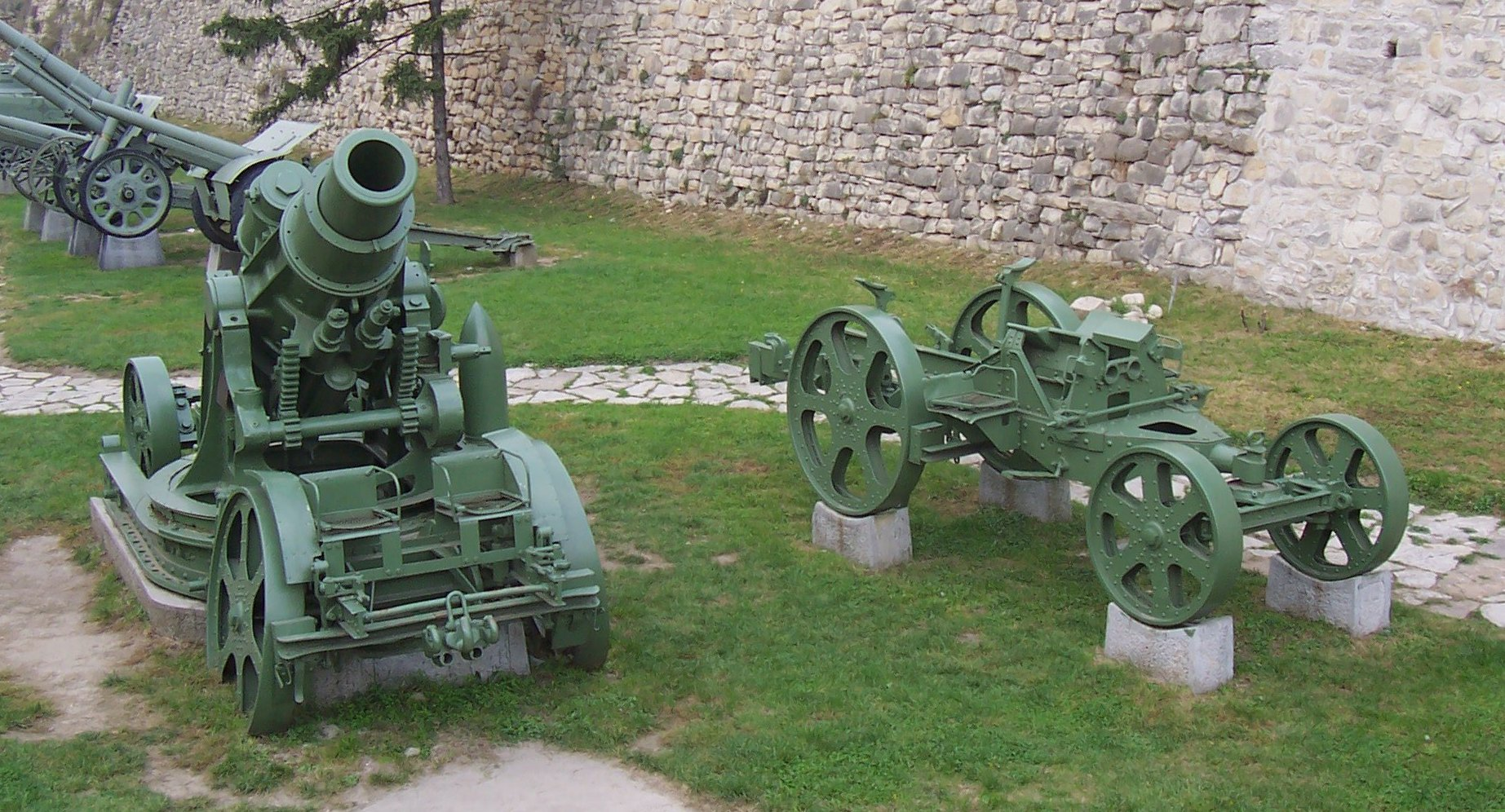
The Skoda 305 mm Model 1911

The largest sieges of the war, however, took place in Europe. The initial German advance into Belgium produced four major sieges: the Battle of Liège, the siege of Namur, the siege of Maubeuge, and the siege of Antwerp. All four would prove crushing German victories, at Liège and Namur against the Belgians, at Maubeuge against the French and at Antwerp against a combined Anglo-Belgian force. The weapon that made these victories possible were the German Big Berthas and the Skoda 305 mm Model 1911 siege mortars, one of the best siege mortars of the war, on loan from Austria-Hungary. These huge guns were the decisive weapon of siege warfare in the 20th century, taking part at Przemyśl, the Belgian sieges, on the Italian Front and Serbian Front, and even being reused in World War II.

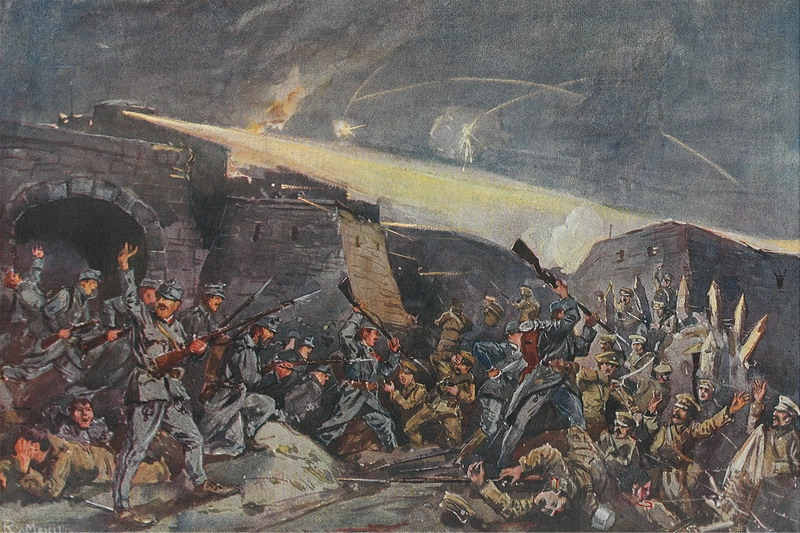
Siege of Przemyśl

At the siege of Przemyśl, during World War I, the Austro-Hungarian garrison showed excellent knowledge of siege warfare, not only waiting for relief, but sending sorties into Russian lines and employing an active defense that resulted in the capture of the Russian General Lavr Kornilov. Despite its excellent performance, the garrison's food supply had been requisitioned for earlier offensives, a relief expedition was stalled by the weather, ethnic rivalries flared up between the defending soldiers, and a breakout attempt failed. When the commander of the garrison Hermann Kusmanek finally surrendered, his troops were eating their horses and the first attempt of large-scale air supply had failed. It was one of the few great victories obtained by either side during the war; 110,000 Austro-Hungarian prisoners were marched back to Russia. Use of aircraft for siege running, bringing supplies to areas under siege, would nevertheless prove useful in many sieges to come.

The largest siege of the war, and arguably the roughest, most gruesome battle in history, was the Battle of Verdun. Whether the battle can be considered true siege warfare is debatable. Under the theories of Erich von Falkenhayn, it is more distinguishable as purely attrition with a coincidental presence of fortifications on the battlefield. When considering the plans of Crown Prince Wilhelm, purely concerned with taking the citadel and not with French casualty figures, it can be considered a true siege. The main fortifications were Fort Douaumont, Fort Vaux, and the fortified city of Verdun itself. The Germans, through the use of huge artillery bombardments, flamethrowers, and infiltration tactics, were able to capture both Vaux and Douaumont, but were never able to take the city, and eventually lost most of their gains. It was a battle that, despite the French ability to fend off the Germans, neither side won. The German losses were not worth the potential capture of the city, and the French casualties were not worth holding the symbol of her defense.

The development of the armored tank and improved infantry tactics at the end of World War I swung the pendulum back in favor of maneuver, and with the advent of Blitzkrieg in 1939, the end of traditional siege warfare was at hand. The Maginot Line would be the prime example of the failure of immobile, post–World War I fortifications. Although sieges would continue, it would be in a totally different style and on a reduced scale.

=== World War II ===
The Blitzkrieg of the Second World War truly showed that fixed fortifications are easily defeated by manoeuvre instead of frontal assault or long sieges. The great Maginot Line was bypassed, and battles that would have taken weeks of siege could now be avoided with the careful application of air power (such as the German paratrooper capture of Fort Eben-Emael, Belgium, early in World War II).

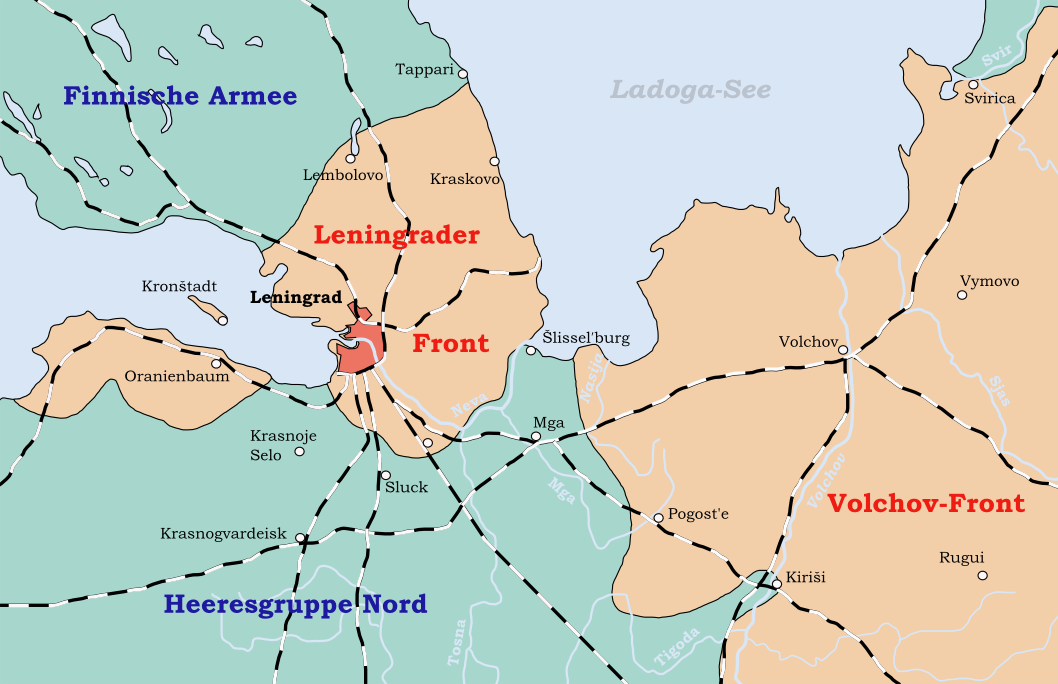
Map showing Axis encirclement during the siege of Leningrad (1942–1943)

The most important siege was the siege of Leningrad, which lasted over 29 months, about half of the duration of the entire Second World War. The siege of Leningrad resulted in the deaths of some one million of the city's inhabitants. Along with the Battle of Stalingrad, the siege of Leningrad on the Eastern Front was the deadliest siege of a city in history. In the west, apart from the Battle of the Atlantic, the sieges were not on the same scale as those on the European Eastern front; however, there were several notable or critical sieges: the island of Malta, for which the population won the George Cross and Tobruk. In the South-East Asian theatre, there was the siege of Singapore, and in the Burma campaign, sieges of Myitkyina, the Admin Box, Imphal, and Kohima, which was the high-water mark for the Japanese advance into India.

The siege of Sevastopol saw the use of the heaviest and most powerful individual siege engines ever to be used: the German 800 mm railway gun and the 600 mm siege mortar. Though a single shell could have disastrous local effect, the guns were susceptible to air attack in addition to being slow to move.

==== Airbridge ====
Throughout the war both the Western Allies and the Germans tried to supply forces besieged behind enemy lines with ad-hoc airbridges. Sometimes these attempts failed, as happened to the besieged German Sixth Army the Battle of Stalingrad, and sometimes they succeeded as happened during the Battle of the Admin Box (5 – 23 February 1944) and the short Siege of Bastogne (December 1944).

The logistics of strategic airbridge operations were developed by the Americans flying military transport aircraft from India to China over the Hump (1942–1945), to resupply the Chinese war effort of Chiang Kai-shek, and to the USAAF XX Bomber Command (during Operation Matterhorn).

Tactical airbridge methods were developed and, as planned, used extensively for supplying the Chindits during Operation Thursday (February – May 1944). The Chindits, a specially trained division of the British and Indian armies, were flown deep behind Japanese front lines in the South-East Asian theatre to jungle clearings in Burma where they set up fortified airheads from which they sailed out to attack Japanese lines of communications, while defending the bases from Japanese counterattacks. The bases were re-supplied by air with casualties flown out by returning aircraft. When the Japanese attacked in strength the Chindits abandoned the bases and either moved to new bases, or back to Allied lines.

=== Post-World War II ===
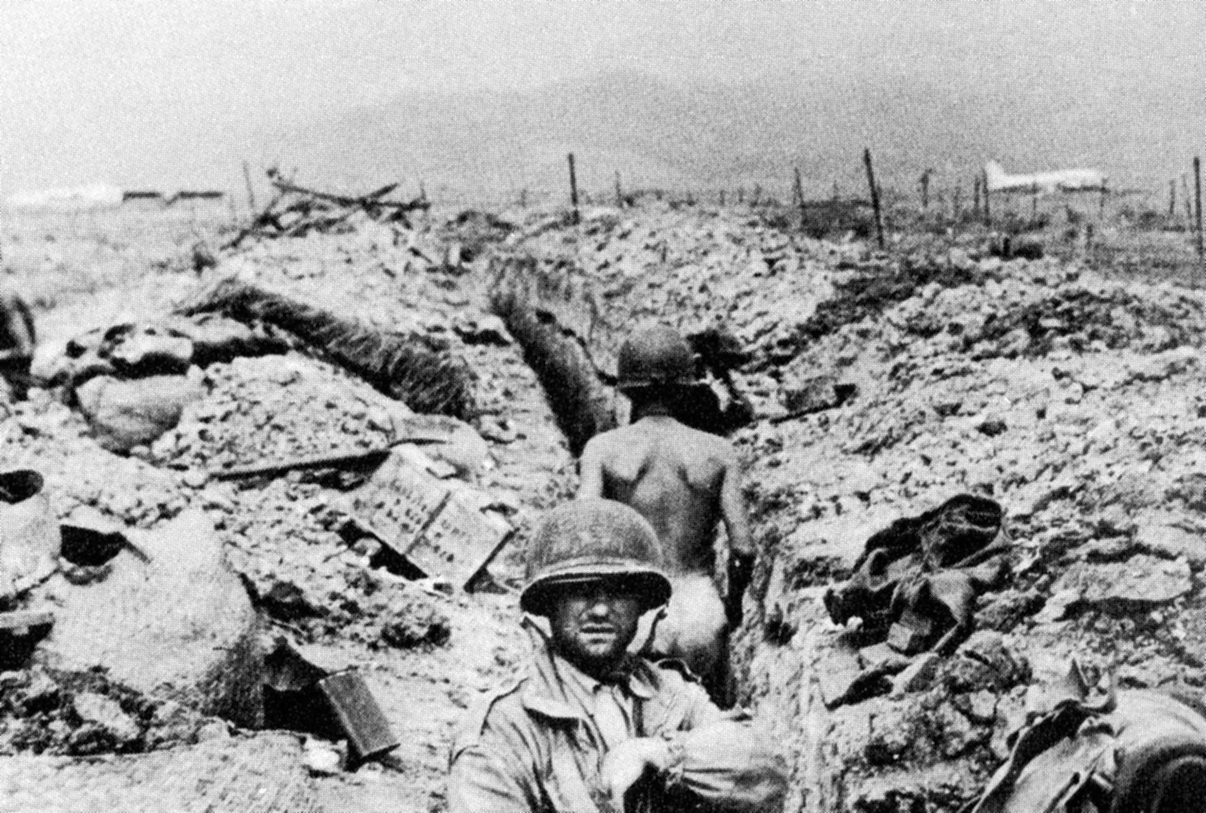
French troops seeking cover in trenches, Dien Bien Phu, 1954

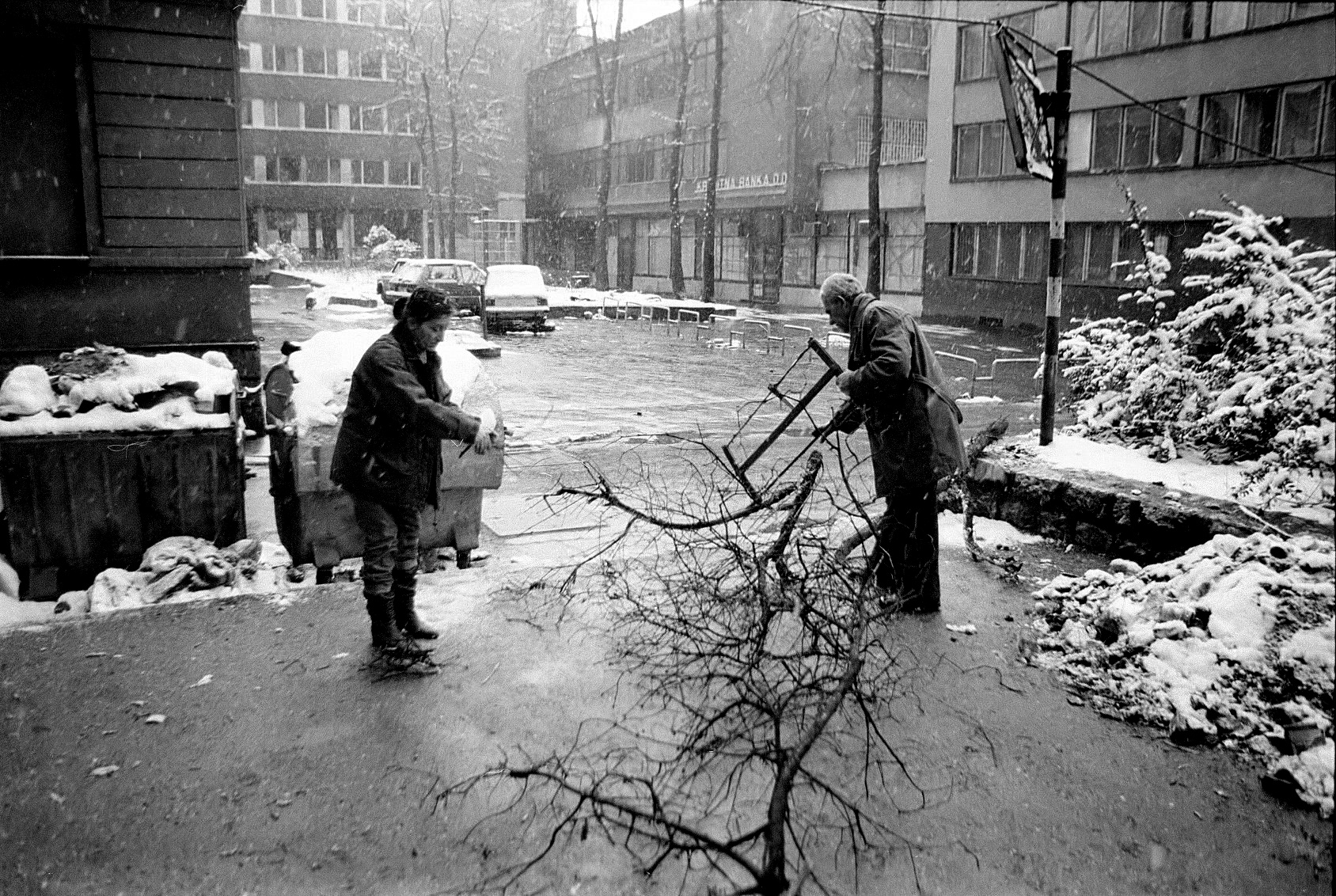
Sarajevo residents collecting firewood, winter of 1992–1993

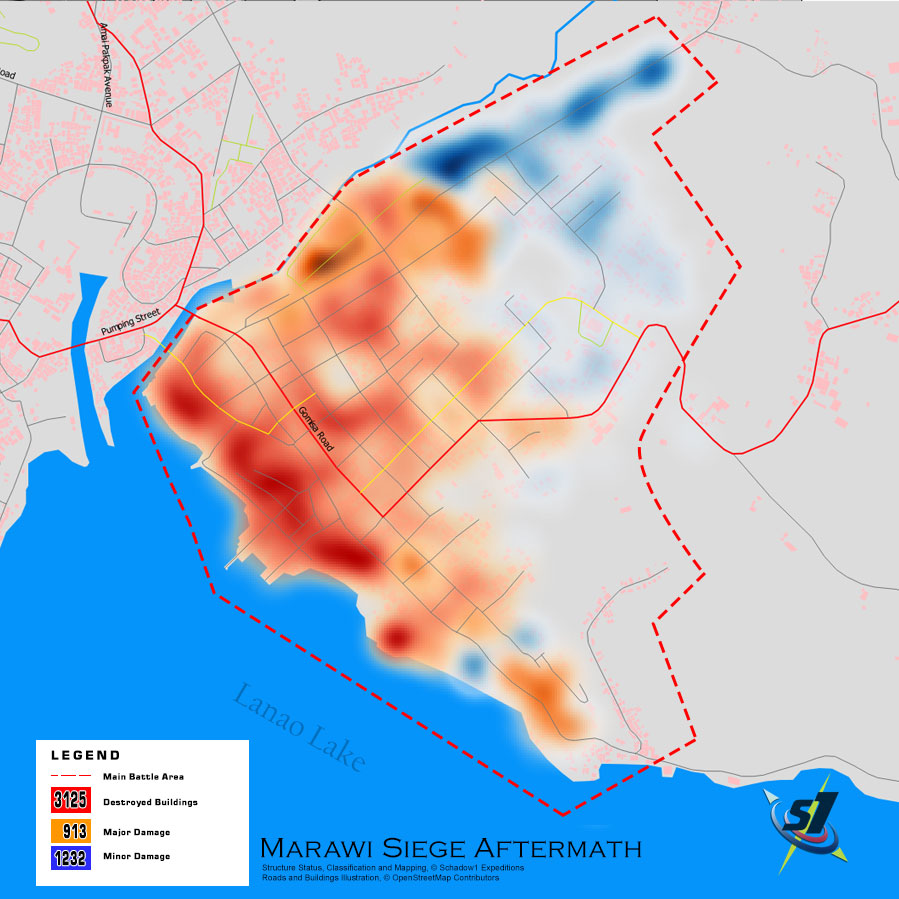
Map of destroyed infrastructure following the siege of Marawi, 2017

Several times during the Cold War the western powers had to use their airbridge expertise.

- The Berlin Blockade from June 1948 to September 1949, the Western Powers flew over 200,000 flights, providing to West Berlin up to 8,893 tons of necessities each day.
- Airbridges were used extensively during the Battle of Dien Bien Phu during the First Indochina War, but failed to prevent its fall to the Việt Minh in 1954.
- In the Vietnam War, airbridges proved crucial during the siege of the American base at Khe Sanh in 1968. The resupply provided kept the North Vietnamese Army from capturing the base.

In both Vietnamese cases, the Viet Minh and NLF were able to cut off the opposing army by capturing the surrounding rugged terrain. At Dien Bien Phu, the French were unable to use air power to overcome the siege and were defeated. However, at Khe Sanh, a mere 14 years later, advances in air power—and a reduction in Vietnamese anti-aircraft capability—allowed the United States to withstand the siege. The resistance of US forces was assisted by the PAVN and PLAF forces' decision to use the Khe Sanh siege as a strategic distraction to allow their mobile warfare offensive, the first Tet Offensive, to unfold securely.

The Battle of Khe Sanh displays typical features of modern sieges, as the defender has greater capacity to withstand the siege, the attacker's main aim is to bottle operational forces or create a strategic distraction, rather than take the siege to a conclusion.

In neighboring Cambodia, at that time known as the Khmer Republic, the Khmer Rouge used siege tactics to cut off supplies from Phnom Penh to other government-held enclaves in an attempt to break the will of the government to continue fighting.

In 1972, during the Easter offensive, the siege of An Lộc Vietnam occurred. ARVN troops and U.S. advisers and air power successfully defeated communist forces. The Battle of An Lộc pitted some 6,350 ARVN men against a force three times that size. During the peak of the battle, ARVN had access to only one 105 mm howitzer to provide close support, while the enemy attack was backed by an entire artillery division. ARVN had no tanks, the NVA communist forces had two armoured regiments. ARVN prevailed after over two months of continuous fighting. As General Paul Vanuxem, a French veteran of the Indochina War, wrote in 1972 after visiting the liberated city of An Lộc: "An Lộc was the Verdun of Vietnam, where Vietnam received as in baptism the supreme consecration of her will."

During the 1982 Lebanon War, the Israel Defence Forces besieged Beirut, the capital of Lebanon, to quickly realize their goals including the eviction of the Palestine Liberation Organization from the country.

During the Yugoslav Wars in the 1990s, Republika Srpska forces besieged Sarajevo, the capital of Bosnia-Herzegovina. The siege lasted from April 1992 until February 1996.

Numerous sieges haven taken place during the Syrian civil war, such as the siege of Homs, siege of Kobanî, siege of Deir ez-Zor (2014–2017), siege of Nubl and al-Zahraa, and siege of al-Fu'ah and Kafriya.

During various points in the Nagorno-Karabakh Conflict, Azerbaijan besieged the capital of Stepanakert (1991-1992), as well as the entire de facto Armenian-controlled republic during the Blockade of Nagorno-Karabakh (2022-2023).

Multiple sieges took place in the Russo-Ukrainian war, notably the siege of Mariupol. Other sieges in the war include the Siege of Chernihiv and Siege of Sloviansk.

During the third Sudanese civil war, the Rapid Support Forces laid siege to the city of El Fasher as part of the Darfur campaign.

The Gaza war contained multiple sieges, including the siege of Gaza City and the siege of Khan Yunis.

The Myanmar civil war has had multiple sieges, with notable examples including the yearlong Siege of Ti Bwar and the eighteen-day-long Siege of Myawaddy.

== Police sieges ==
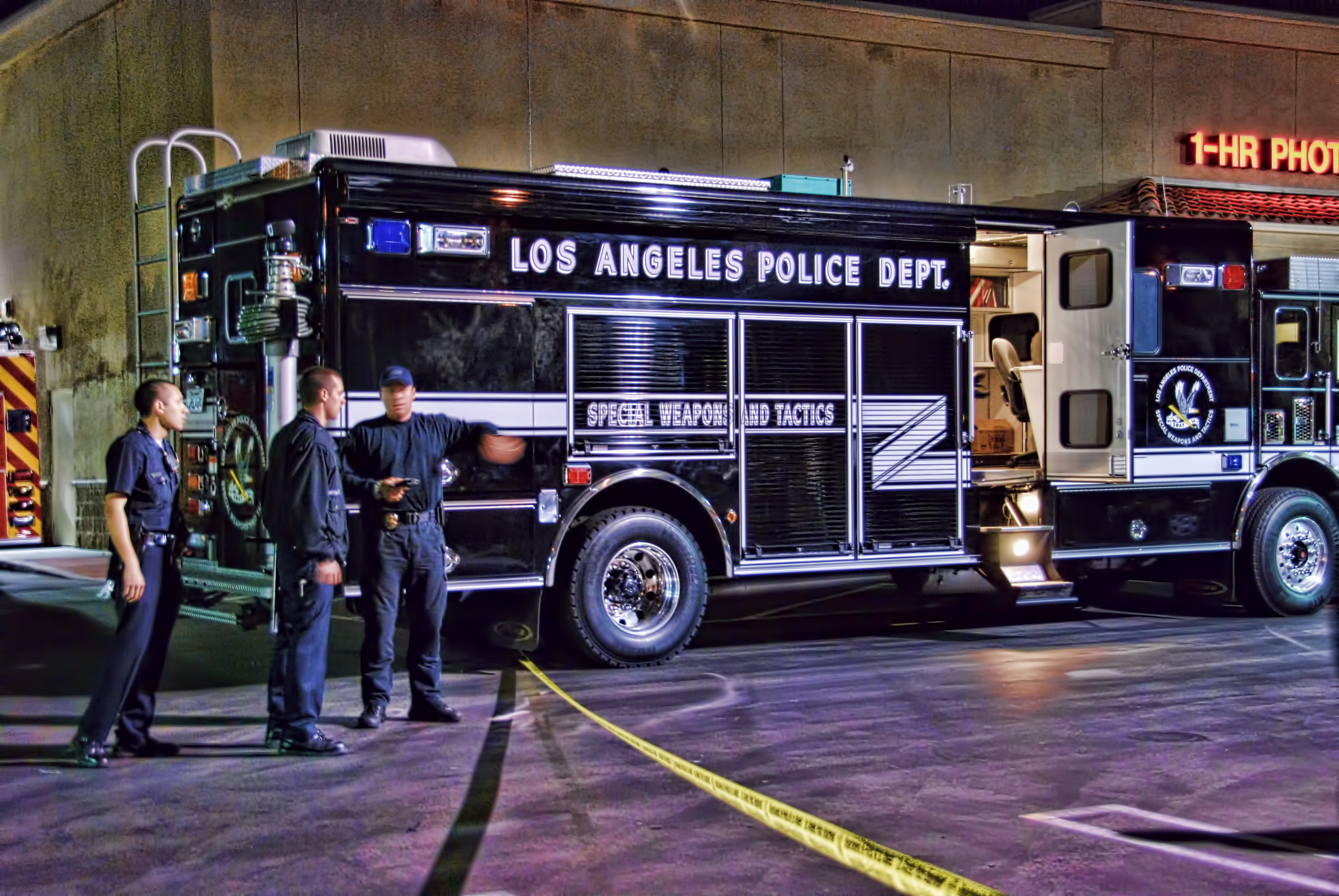
A Los Angeles Police Department Metropolitan Division truck at the scene of a standoff in 2009

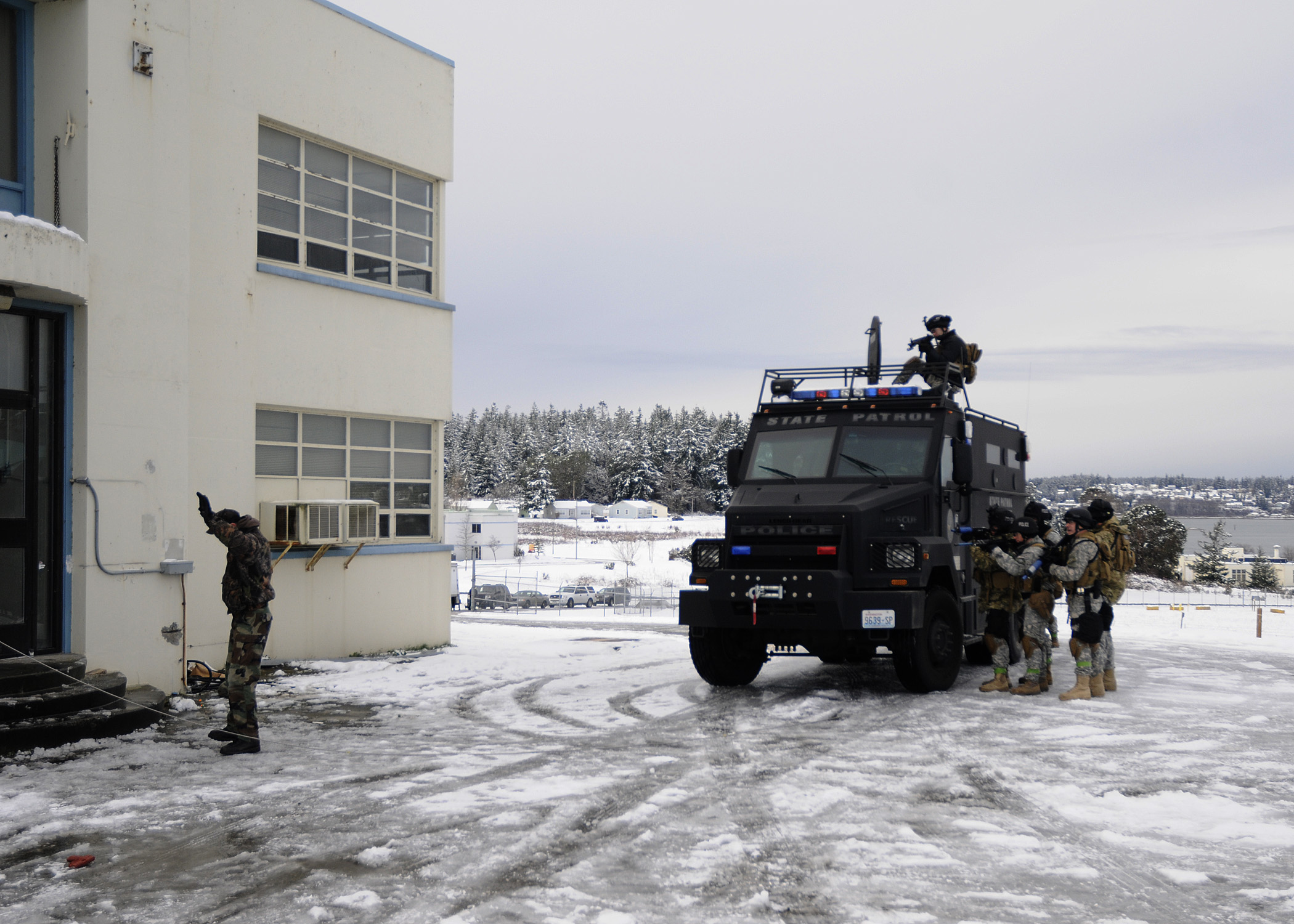
Washington State Patrol SWAT attempting to arrest a suspect during a simulated standoff in 2011

Siege tactics continue to be employed in police contexts; such a siege is typically called a standoff or, in law enforcement jargon, a barricade situation. Standoffs may result from crimes and incidents such as robberies, raids, search and arrest warrants, prison riots, or terrorist attacks. Standoffs occur due to a variety of factors, most prominently the safety of police (against whom the besieged may have the upper hand), the besieged suspects (who police generally intend to arrest), bystanders (who may be in the crossfire), and hostages (who may be injured or killed by the suspects).

The optimal result of most standoffs is a peaceful resolution: the safe extraction of hostages and bystanders, and the peaceful surrender and arrest of the hostage-takers. To ensure this, police make use of trained negotiators and psychologists to learn the hostage-takers' demands (and meet said demands if feasible or permissible), gain the hostage-takers' trust, clarify that police do not intend to kill them or will even let them go (regardless of whether such claims are true), and coax the hostage-takers into surrendering or at least releasing hostages. In the event a peaceful resolution is impossible—negotiations fail or do not proceed, hostages are released but the hostage-takers refuse to surrender, the hostage-takers resist violently, or hostages are killed—police may respond in force, generally being able to rely on police tactical units or even military support if possible and required.

Most standoffs are much shorter than military sieges, often lasting hours or days at most. Lengthy sieges may still occur, albeit rarely, such as the 51-day-long 1993 Waco siege. Most standoffs end in a peaceful resolution (i.e. 1973 Brooklyn hostage crisis, 1997 Roby standoff), though some may end in a police or military assault (i.e. 1994 Air France Flight 8969 hijacking, 1980 Iranian Embassy siege) or, in the worst-case scenarios, the deaths of authorities, hostage-takers, or hostages (i.e. 1985 MOVE bombing, 1985 EgyptAir Flight 648 hijacking, 2004 Beslan school siege, 2022 Robb Elementary School shooting). The aforementioned worst-case scenarios often result from poor planning, tactics, or negotiations on the part of the authorities (e.g. accidental killings of hostages by Unit 777 during the EgyptAir Flight 648 hijacking), or from violent acts committed by the hostage-takers (e.g. suicide bombings and executions during the Beslan school siege).

In some jurisdictions, depending on certain circumstances, standoffs that would usually be handled by police may be transferred to the military. For example, in the United Kingdom, standoffs with terrorists may be transferred to military responsibility for a military assault on the besieged. The threat of such an action ended the 1975 Balcombe Street siege, but the 1980 Iranian Embassy siege ended in a military assault and the deaths of all but one of the hostage-takers.

== See also ==
- Battleplan (documentary TV series)
- Blitzkrieg
- Breastwork (fortification)
- Infiltration
- Last stand
- Maneuver warfare
- Medieval warfare
- Sangar (fortification)
- Siege engines
- Siege equipment
- Tunnel warfare

Lists

- List of established military terms
- List of sieges
