= Roby, Illinois =

- Unincorporated community
- Location within Illinois Location within the United States
- Coordinates: 39°44′21″N 89°23′57″W
- Country: United States
- State: Illinois
- County: Christian
- Elevation: 587 ft (179 m)
- Time zone: UTC-6 (Central (CST))
  - Summer (DST): UTC-5 (CDT)
- Area code: 217
- GNIS feature ID: 416782

Roby is an unincorporated community in Christian County, Illinois, United States. The town was the site of the 1997 standoff with Shirley Ann Allen.
