= Aftermath of the January 6 United States Capitol attack =

The January 6 United States Capitol attack had political, legal, and social repercussions. The second impeachment of Donald Trump, who was charged for incitement of insurrection for his conduct, occurred on January 13. At the same time, Cabinet officials were pressured to invoke the 25th Amendment for removing Trump from office. Trump was subsequently acquitted in the Senate trial, which was held in February after Trump had already left office. The result was a 57–43 vote in favor of conviction, with every Democrat and seven Republicans voting to convict, but two-thirds of the Senate (67 votes) are required to convict. Many in the Trump administration resigned. Several large companies announced they were halting all political donations, and others have suspended funding the lawmakers who had objected to certifying Electoral College results. A bill was introduced to form an independent commission, similar to the 9/11 Commission, to investigate the events surrounding the attack; it passed the House but was blocked by Republicans in the Senate. The House then approved a House "select committee" to investigate the attack. In June, the Senate released the results of its own investigation of the attack. The event led to strong criticism of law enforcement agencies. Leading figures within the United States Capitol Police resigned. A large-scale criminal investigation was undertaken, with the Federal Bureau of Investigation (FBI) opening more than 1,200 case files. Federal law enforcement undertook a nationwide manhunt for the perpetrators, with arrests and indictments following within days. Over 890 people had been found guilty of federal crimes.

Trump was suspended from various social media sites for his involvement in inciting the attack, at first temporarily and then indefinitely. In response to posts by Trump supporters in favour of the attempts to overturn the election, the social networking site Parler was shut down by its service providers. Corporate suspensions of other accounts and programs associated with participating groups also took place.

The inauguration week was marked by nationwide security concerns. Unprecedented security preparations for the inauguration of Joe Biden were undertaken, including the deployment of 25,000 National Guard members. In May, the House passed a $1.9 billion Capitol security bill in response to the attack.

In the days following the attack on the Capitol, Republican politicians in at least three states introduced legislation creating new prohibitions on protest activity.

Trump has publicly embraced and celebrated the January 6 Capitol attack. Trump and elected officials within the Republican Party have since promoted a revisionist history of the event by downplaying the severity of the violence, spread conspiracy theories about the attack, called those charged "hostages" and portrayed them as martyrs. (Note: Attributed to multiple sources.)

After his re-election in the 2024 United States presidential election, Trump pardoned about 1,500 people convicted of offenses related to the attack on January 20, 2025.

== Casualties ==
One person was killed. Five people died. To varying degrees, their deaths have been attributed to the riot. Over a hundred police officers were injured.

=== Deaths ===
==== Ashli Babbitt ====
As lawmakers were being evacuated by Capitol Police, Ashli Elizabeth Babbitt, a 35-year-old Air Force veteran, attempted to climb through a shattered window in a barricaded door and was shot in the chest by Lt. Michael Leroy Byrd, dying from the wound. The bullet pierced Ashli in her left anterior shoulder, perforated her left brachial plexus, trachea, upper lobe of the right lung and second anterior rib, and landed in her right anterior shoulder. The shooting was recorded on several cameras. Capitol Police officers had been warned that many attackers were carrying concealed weapons, although a subsequent search revealed no weapons in Babbitt's possession. In the minutes before she was shot, the crowd had threatened police. A fellow rally attendee who was right near Babbitt recalled she had been warned not to proceed through the window: "A number of police and Secret Service were saying 'Get back! Get down! Get out of the way!'; she didn't heed the call...".

Republican Representative Markwayne Mullin said he witnessed the shooting; he felt that Lt. Byrd "didn't have a choice" but to shoot, and that this action "saved people's lives". According to Mullin, at the time, law enforcement was trying to defend two fronts to the House Chamber from the mob, and "a lot of members [of Congress] and staff that were in danger at the time". Zachary Jordan Alam (who was standing next to Babbitt) was videotaped smashing the glass window that Babbitt tried to climb through. He was later indicted on twelve federal counts, including assaulting officers with a dangerous weapon. Following the routine process for shootings by Capitol Police officers, the D.C. Metropolitan Police Department and the Justice Department investigated Babbitt's death and declined to charge Lt. Byrd. Babbitt was a follower of the QAnon conspiracy theory, and had tweeted the previous day "the storm is here", a reference to its prophecy. There has since been an effort by conservative media and political figures to present her as a martyr.

==== Brian Sicknick ====
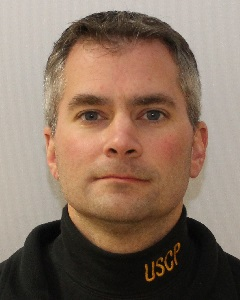
Capitol Police officer Brian Sicknick was assaulted by rioters. He died of a stroke the next day.

On January 7, 2021, a United States Capitol Police (USCP) officer, Brian Sicknick, died in a hospital the day after collapsing at the U.S. Capitol after suffering two strokes. Sicknick had responded to the attack on January 6, during which he had been assaulted with pepper spray by two rioters. His cremated remains were laid in honor in the Capitol Rotunda on February 2, 2021, before they were buried with full honors at Arlington National Cemetery.

==== Others ====
Three other Trump supporters also died: Rosanne Boyland, 34, of Kennesaw, Georgia, Kevin Greeson, 55, from Athens, Alabama, and Benjamin Philips, 50, of Bloomsburg, Pennsylvania. Boyland was a radicalized follower of QAnon whose family had begged her not to attend. Initially thought to have been trampled to death by the crowd, she was later confirmed to have died of an amphetamine overdose during the attack. Her death was classified as accidental by the D.C. medical examiner's office. Greeson reportedly had a heart attack outdoors on the Capitol grounds, and was declared dead at 2:05 p.m., shortly before the breach of the Capitol. He had become a radicalized Trump supporter in the preceding years; in December 2020, he declared: "Let's take this fucking Country BACK!! Load your guns and take to the streets!" His family said he was "not there to participate in violence or rioting, nor did he condone such actions". Philips was initially reported to have died of a stroke after splitting from his group at 10:30 in the morning. There is no indication that he had participated in the attack. Philips was the founder of Trumparoo.com, a social media page for Trump supporters, and he made arrangements for fellow supporters to travel to D.C. Greeson and Philips' deaths were later confirmed to be natural deaths from both coronary heart disease and hypertensive heart disease, ruled the D.C. medical examiner's office.

Four police officers who defended the Capitol during the attack subsequently died by suicide.

=== Injuries ===
Participants in the civil disorder (Note: Only sporadic instances of injured rioters have been publicly recorded; injuries in general (such as a total number) among this group have not.) and responders had been injured in the struggle. There were 138 officers (73 Capitol Police and 65 Metropolitan Police) injured, of whom 15 were hospitalized, some with severe injuries. All had been released from the hospital by January 11.

Shortly after 2:00 p.m., several rioters attempted to breach a door on the West Front of the Capitol. They dragged three D.C. Metro police officers out of formation and down a set of stairs, trapped them in a crowd, and assaulted them with improvised weapons (including hockey sticks, crutches, flags, poles, sticks, and stolen police shields) as the mob chanted "police stand down!" and "USA!". At least one of the officers was also stomped.

Some rioters beat officers on the head with lead pipes, and others used chemical irritants, stun guns, fists, sticks, poles and clubs against the police. Some trampled and stampeded police, pushed them down stairs or against statues or shone laser pointers into their eyes. One D.C. Metro officer was hit six times with a stun gun, was beaten with a flagpole, suffered a mild heart attack, and lost a fingertip. Three officers were hit on their heads by a fire extinguisher allegedly thrown by a retired firefighter.

According to the Capitol Police officers' union chairman, multiple officers sustained traumatic brain injuries. One had two cracked ribs and two smashed spinal discs; another lost an eye. One was stabbed with a metal fence stake. One was crushed between a door and a riot shield while defending the west side of the Capitol with other officers against rioters; he later had headaches he believed stemmed from a concussion.

Morale among the Capitol Police plummeted after the riots. The department responded to several incidents where its officers threatened to harm themselves; one officer turned in her weapon because she feared what she would do with it. Two police officers who responded to the attack died by suicide in the following days: one Capitol Police officer, Officer Howard Liebengood, three days after the attack, and a D.C. Metro Police officer, Officer Jeffrey Smith, who had been injured in the attack, afterward. Some members of Congress and press reports have included these deaths in the casualty count, for a total of seven deaths. Metropolitan Police Officers Kyle DeFreytag and Gunther Hashida died by suicide on July 10 and 29, respectively; both had responded to the Capitol attack.

As of June 3, 2021, at least 17 police officers (10 Capitol Police, seven Metropolitan Police) remained out of work due to injuries sustained in the riot five months previously. Of that number, six Metropolitan Police officers were still on medical leave in mid-July; the Capitol Police did not disclose how many of its officers were on leave, but confirmed that some officers had acquired career-ending disabilities.

== Completion of electoral vote count ==
The Senate resumed their debate after 8:00 p.m.

Congress reconvened in the evening of January 6 after the Capitol was cleared of trespassers. Senate Majority Leader Mitch McConnell reopened the Senate's session around 8:00 p.m., saying the Senate refused to be intimidated and that it would count the electors and declare the president "tonight", after two hours of debate on the objection to the Arizona electors. He called the vote the most consequential in his thirty-plus years of congressional service. At 9:58 p.m., the Senate rejected the objection 93–6, with only six Republicans voting in favor: Ted Cruz (TX), Josh Hawley (MO), Cindy Hyde-Smith (MS), John Neely Kennedy (LA), Roger Marshall (KS), and Tommy Tuberville (AL).

At 11:08 p.m., the House rejected a similar motion to dispute the Arizona vote by a margin of 303–121. All the "yeas" came from Republicans while the "nays" were from 83 Republicans and 220 Democrats. A planned objection to the Georgia slate of electors was rejected after co-signing Senator, Kelly Loeffler (R-GA), withdrew her support in light of the day's events. Another objection was raised by Hawley and Representative Scott Perry (R–PA) to the Pennsylvania slate of electors, triggering another two-hour split in the joint session to debate the objection. At 12:30 a.m. on January 7, the Senate rejected this objection by a 92–7 vote, with the same people voting the same way as before with the exceptions of Senators Cynthia Lummis (R-WY) and Rick Scott (R-FL) voting in favor and John N. Kennedy voting against.

At 3:08 a.m., the House of Representatives similarly rejected the motion to sustain the objection by a margin of 282–138. Again, all the votes in favor were Republican, while this time only 64 Republicans voted against and 218 Democrats voted against. Representative Peter Meijer (R–MI) said that several of his Republican colleagues in the House would have voted to certify the votes, but did not out of fear for the safety of their families, and that at least one specifically voted to overturn Biden's victory against their conscience because they were shaken by the mob attack that day.

At 3:41 a.m., Congress confirmed the outcome of the Electoral College vote, Biden's 306 votes to Trump's 232, with Pence declaring that Biden and Harris would take office on January 20.

== Criminal investigations and charges ==
An FBI video of a suspect accused of attacking police officers

The U.S. Department of Justice is probing whether to bring seditious conspiracy charges against some of those involved in the attack. Regarding calls for the president to be prosecuted for inciting the violence, Interim United States Attorney for the District of Columbia Michael R. Sherwin said any Capitol Police officer found to have assisted the rioters would be charged, and he further suggested that Trump could be investigated for comments he made to his supporters before they stormed the Capitol and that others who "assisted or facilitated or played some ancillary role" in the events could also be investigated. Federal prosecutors were also considering whether to pursue charges under the Racketeer Influenced and Corrupt Organizations Act, which is typically used to prosecute organized crime syndicates, against groups such as Proud Boys and Oath Keepers.

By March 2021, the Justice Department said the "investigation and prosecution of the Capitol Attack will likely be one of the largest in American history, both in terms of the number of defendants prosecuted and the nature and volume of the evidence". The Department asked courts to delay most cases by at least two months so the volumes of cases and evidence could be better managed.

Some Trump supporters attacked with metal pipes, discharged chemical irritants, and brandished other weapons. A number of them were arrested for offenses such as possession and carry of unlicensed pistols, carrying a rifle without a license, possessing a high capacity feeding device, carrying unregistered ammunition, possession of a prohibited weapon (taser) and possessing illegal fireworks. One defendant allegedly had, inside his truck, an AR-15 style rifle, a shotgun, a crossbow, several machetes, smoke grenades and 11 Molotov cocktails.

On August 20, 2021, Reuters reported that the FBI investigation did not find meaningful evidence that the attack was centrally coordinated by way of a broader plot, such that would involve well known Trump-allied public figures, and cast doubt on the likelihood of charges of seditious conspiracy being brought.

=== Arrests ===
Chicago Police officer Karol Chwiesiuk was arrested on June 11, 2021, for his involvement in the Capitol attack.

Notable arrests include: West Virginia state lawmaker Derrick Evans, who later resigned from office; Klete Keller, a former U.S. Olympic swimmer; Nicolas Ochs, the leader of a Proud Boys group in Hawaii; Jake Angeli, also known as the "QAnon Shaman"; far-right activist Tim "Baked Alaska" Gionet; Aaron Mostofsky, the 34-year-old son of a Brooklyn Supreme Court judge; L. Brent Bozell IV, the son of conservative activist L. Brent Bozell III and the grandson of L. Brent Bozell Jr.; Jon Schaffer, frontman of heavy metal band Iced Earth and lifetime member of the Oath Keepers; and two people who work for InfoWars, host Owen Shroyer and video editor Samuel Montoya.

Others arrested include Richard "Bigo" Barnett, the leader of an Arkansas gun rights organization who stole a letter from Pelosi's desk; Larry Rendell Brock, a retired Air Force Reserve officer from Texas who roamed the Senate chamber in a green tactical vest with a white flex cuff; Lonnie Coffman, whose truck was found two blocks from the Capitol containing eleven homemade bombs, an assault rifle, and a handgun; Douglas Jenson, who led a mob of rioters chasing Officer Goodman; Robert Keith Packer, who wore a "Camp Auschwitz" sweatshirt; William Merry Jr, who ripped off a chunk of Pelosi's nameplate above her office; Adam Johnson, who allegedly stole Pelosi's lectern and Riley Willams who stole Pelosi's laptop from her office and allegedly directed crowds of rioters.

== Other investigations ==
=== Congressional ===
On January 7, 2021, five House Committees (House Committee on Oversight and Reform, House Committee on the Judiciary, House Committee on Homeland Security, House Permanent Select Committee on Intelligence, & House Committee on Armed Services) sent a letter to Federal Bureau of Investigation (FBI) Director Christopher Wray seeking an immediate briefing on the FBI's efforts to investigate the deadly attack on the U.S. Capitol.

House Speaker Nancy Pelosi touched upon the investigations in a speech on January 15, stating that "if, in fact, it is found that members of Congress were accomplices to this insurrection, if they aided and abetted the crime, there may have to be actions taken beyond the Congress in terms of prosecution for that". That same day, Pelosi established Task Force 1-6 and appointed retired Lt. General Russel Honoré to lead "an immediate review of security infrastructure, interagency processes and command and control". The mandate of the task forces was to determine what security failures enabled the pro-Trump insurrectionists to overrun the building and delay congressional certification of the results of the 2020 presidential election.

On January 16, 2021, The House Committees on Oversight & Reform, Judiciary, Homeland Security, and Intelligence requested relevant documents and briefings from the FBI, Department of Homeland Security's Office of Intelligence & Analysis, the National Counterterrorism Center, and the Office of the Director of National Intelligence as part of "a review of the events and intelligence surrounding the insurrection on January 6th incited by President Trump, and related threats against the nation's peaceful transition of power, including the Inauguration".

On March 5, 2021, Task Force 1-6 finalized their 6-week long security review and published their findings. The 15 page document recommended numerous changes to improve the Capitol Police's ability to respond to a crisis. Some of which included the following:

1. Increasing the size of the Capitol Police and expanding USCP's intelligence team;
2. Give the USCP Chief the authority to request external law enforcement and National Guard support without CPB preapproval in "extraordinary emergency circumstances";
3. Have USCP take immediate action to eliminate personnel shortfalls, currently 233 officers, through enhanced recruiting and incentive programs. Additionally, the Task Force requested that Congress immediately authorize appropriations to enable the Sergeants at Arms to procure security systems for all Member district offices and residences.

The report has been criticized for its lack of an explanation as to the lack of security at the Capitol to begin with. Capitol Police, the Metro D.C. Police, nor the military took any special measures knowing well in advance that thousands would descend on Washington, D.C., that morning, including armed groups such as the Proud Boys.

==== Independent January 6 commission ====
On February 13, 2021, Pelosi announced plans for a bicameral commission to investigate the attack on the Capitol, modeled after the 9/11 Commission, an independent panel that investigated the attacks of September 11, 2001. The 9/11 Commission had been created in 2002 by Congress and, fifteen months later, had issued a detailed report on its findings. Pelosi and Minority Member, Kevin McCarthy tasked the highest-ranking members of the House Homeland Security Committee (Chair Bennie Thompson (D-MS) and Ranking Member John Katko (R-NY)) to negotiate and establish the commission. Despite initial bipartisan support, Democrats and Republicans disagreed about the proposed commission's membership and scope of its investigation, and the process stalled.

On May 14, 2021, Thompson and Katko announced H.R. 3233, or the National Commission to Investigate the January 6 Attack on the United States Capitol Complex Act. The resolution that was ultimately introduced to the House on May 19 met all Republican objections; it contained an equal number of members from each party, required approval of both parties to issue subpoenas, and set a firm deadline of December 31, 2021, to complete the report. The bill to form the commission passed the House of Representatives by a vote of 252–175, with 35 Republicans and every Democrat supporting it. However, on May 28, Senate Republicans filibustered it. The commission was never created.

==== U.S. Senate investigation ====
On June 8, 2021, the Senate released the results of its investigation of the riot, led by the Senate Rules and Homeland Security & Governmental Affairs committees, and conducted on a bipartisan basis. The investigation received a degree of cooperation from the FBI, the Department of Homeland Security, the Justice Department and the House Sergeant at Arms, while other agencies did not hand over documents on time. The report was the most comprehensive official account of the event up to that point, while remaining confined to security preparations and law enforcement response, with some of the findings reiterating parts of existing reports. The motivations of participants, and those of Donald Trump, were not probed, and his conduct was not treated in a contextual manner, e.g. Trump's January 6 speech was included in an appendix.

According to the report, Capitol Police was aware of a threat, but did not take it seriously, did not share intelligence, did not incorporate the warnings into the operational plan for January 6, and, ultimately, the force lacked the capacity to respond; more than a dozen intelligence failures are recounted. A number of recommendations, some related to potential new legislation, are listed.

==== Formation of House select committee ====
In late May, when it had become apparent that the filibuster of the bicameral commission would not be overcome, Pelosi indicated that she would appoint a select committee to investigate the events as a fallback option. On June 30, 2021, the measure (House Resolution 503) to form the committee passed by a vote of 222 to 190, with all Democratic members and two Republican members, Adam Kinzinger and Liz Cheney, voting in favor. Sixteen Republican members did not vote on the measure.

On July 27, 2021, almost a month after the Select Committee was established, the Select Committee had their first public hearing. Four police officers (Pfc. Harry Dunn and Sgt. Aquilino Gonell of the U.S. Capitol Police, and Michael Fanone and Daniel Hodges of the Washington, D.C., Metropolitan Police Department) testified about the physical assaults and verbal threats they faced responding to the attack at the U.S. Capitol in a highly emotional hearing.

Throughout the rest of 2021 and through 2022, the Select Committee interviewed hundreds of persons of interest and received thousands of documents. Additionally, the Select Committee voted to hold Trump allies Peter Navarro, Dan Scavino, Steven Bannon and Mark Meadows in contempt of congress. However, the Department of Justice has declined to charge Meadows or Scavino. The DOJ has charged Navarro and Bannon.

In early June 2022, after months of delay, the Select Committee announced public hearings.

=== Department of Defense ===
In a letter to acting U.S. Defense Secretary Christopher C. Miller on January 11, Senator Tammy Duckworth (D-IL) asked the Department of Defense to investigate the role of active or retired members of the U.S. military in the attack and for any people identified to be held accountable. Representatives Ruben Gallego (D-AZ) and Sara Jacobs (D-CA) also called on Miller to work alongside federal authorities to identify members of the military involved in the riot.

After the Capitol siege, the Defense Department intensified efforts to root out far-right extremism among military personnel. In 2020, the FBI notified the Defense Department that it had initiated criminal investigations involving 68 military personnel (many retired or discharged) associated with domestic extremism. The National Defense Authorization Act for Fiscal Year 2021, enacted by Congress shortly before the attack on the Capitol, directed the Defense Department to create a deputy inspector general for diversity and inclusion and supremacist, extremism and criminal gang activity (within the DOD office of inspector general) and to keep track of gang and extremist activity in the military. Miller directed a strengthening of military policy against service personnel participating in extremist or hate groups, an issue to be addressed as part of a wider Defense Department report due on March 31, with a plan of action due on June 30.

=== Disciplinary ===
In September, Capitol Police said that its office of professional responsibility had started 38 internal investigations, as a result of which it has recommended disciplinary action against six members of the force for their conduct during the attack; no criminal charges were announced.

=== Justice Department ===
On December 12, 2024, Inspector General Michael Horowitz released a final report. As the Justice Department summarized it: "We found no evidence ... showing or suggesting that the FBI had undercover employees in the various protest crowds, or at the Capitol, on January 6."

=== Nongovernmental ===
==== New York State Bar Association ====
On January 11, the New York State Bar Association (NYSBA) announced that it has launched an inquiry into Rudy Giuliani for his role in the uprising, which could subject him to expulsion from the association and recommendation for disbarment if he is held liable. Giuliani had addressed the crowd before it marched towards the Capitol, saying evidence that the election had been stolen was plentiful and proposing "trial by combat".

==== Crowdsourced ====
Wired magazine has reported that numerous crowdsourced open-source intelligence efforts at tracking participants in the attack were underway, including an investigation by the investigative journalism network Bellingcat and the open source intelligence database Intelligence X. According to Gizmodo, almost the entire contents of the Alt-tech social media site Parler have been archived online, including large numbers of photos and video with GPS metadata, and that analysis of the GPS coordinates suggested that numerous Parler users had been involved in the attack.

==== Employers ====
Multiple people involved in the riot have been investigated by their workplaces, with some being fired for their participation, as some businesses were identified by social media users who called for negative reviews and comments to be posted or the establishments to be boycotted.

Most businesses who have done so are private businesses, as those who work for the government and unionized workers hold more protections from firing. The earliest report of participants being fired was a Maryland man identified in several highly publicized pictures, wearing his work ID badge and fired from his position the next day.

Following the riot, police departments of Anne Arundel County, Maryland, New York City, Philadelphia, Rocky Mount, Virginia, San Antonio, Texas, Seattle, Washington, Troy, New Hampshire, and Zelienople, Pennsylvania; the Kentucky State Police, SEPTA's Transit Police, and the sheriff's departments of Charles County, Maryland, Bexar County, Texas, and Franklin County, Kentucky, all investigated, reassigned, or suspended officers for their involvement in the invasion of the Capitol or the preceding events. Other law enforcement officers were investigated for making statements in support of the rally and riot.

== Scrutiny of police response ==
Law enforcement's intelligence, communication, and operational failures, which allowed the mob to breach the Capitol, attracted scrutiny to the Capitol Police, and the FBI, as well as other law enforcement agencies involved. The three top security officials for Congress – the chief of the Capitol Police, the Senate sergeant at arms, and the House sergeant at arms – all resigned. The acting Capitol Police chief Yogananda Pittman, who took over leadership of the force two days after the attack on the Capitol, subsequently said in congressional testimony that the response to the attack as a "multi-tiered failure" by law enforcement.

Questions have been raised in some media outlets regarding alleged discrepancies in the police response to Black Lives Matter protesters and the rioters who stormed the U.S. Capitol. According to an analysis by The Guardian of statistics collected by the US Crisis Monitor, "Police in the United States are three times more likely to use force against leftwing protesters than rightwing protesters", regardless of whether the protest is peaceful or violent.

On June 26, 2023, the Senate committee on Homeland Security and Governmental Affairs released a report on intelligence failures.

== Trump administration resignations ==
Dozens of Trump administration officeholders resigned in reaction to the attack, even though their terms in office would expire fourteen days later with the inauguration of President Biden. Some senior officials, however, decided against resigning in order to ensure an "orderly transition of power" to the incoming Biden administration, out of concern that Trump would replace them with loyalist lower-level staffers who they feared could carry out illegal orders given by him.

The high-ranking officials who resigned include Matthew Pottinger, the Deputy National Security Advisor, and four executive department heads: Elaine Chao (Transportation), Betsy DeVos (Education), Chad Wolf (Homeland Security), and Alex Azar (Health and Human Services).

== Impeachment and acquittal ==
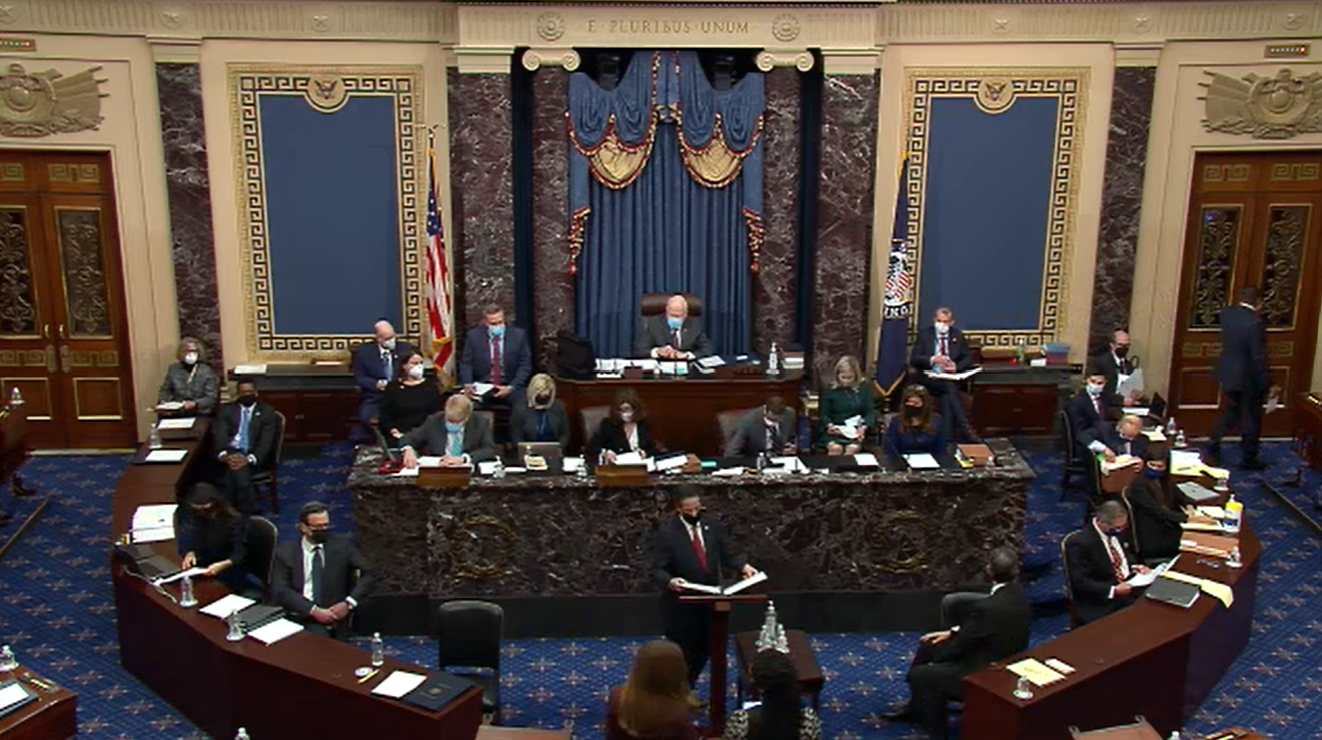
President pro tempore Patrick Leahy presiding over the second impeachment trial of Donald Trump

On January 11, 2021, Representatives David Cicilline (D-RI), Jamie Raskin (D-MD), and Ted Lieu (D-CA) introduced to the House a single article of impeachment against Trump, which they had written, for "incitement of insurrection" in urging his supporters to march on the Capitol building. Trump was impeached for the second time on January 13, becoming the only federal official in United States history to have ever been impeached twice. On February 13, following a five-day Senate trial, Trump was acquitted when the Senate voted 57–43 for conviction, falling ten votes short of the two-thirds majority required to convict; seven Republicans joined every Democrat in voting to convict, the most bipartisan support in any Senate impeachment trial of a president.

== Crackdowns on extremist content and Trump connections ==
The role of social media in the attack created pressure for platforms to strengthen enforcement of moderation policies prohibiting extremist content to prevent further violence. The response of social media platforms renewed accusations by some conservatives that their policies and enforcement promote an implicit ideological bias by limiting the expression of conservative political and social viewpoints even through controversial or false statements. The First Amendment, however, only restricts government-sanctioned limits on speech, and its protections do not apply to private entities and to obscene or defamatory speech.

=== Corporate suspensions of Trump's social media, content, and connections ===
Twitter assessed that two of Trump's tweets on January 8 could be mobilized by different audiences to incite violence and replicate the criminal acts perpetrated at the Capitol on January 6 and suspended Trump's main account first for twelve hours and then permanently. Following this, Trump attempted to access alternate accounts, such as the official President of the United States (@POTUS) account, on the platform to continue tweeting and to bemoan the suspension of his account. Still, all tweets were subsequently deleted, and the accounts were either suspended or banned. Furthermore, Trump was banned from other major social media outlets including Facebook, YouTube, and Snapchat. In the days following the riots, multiple social media companies began suspending or permanently banning several accounts and users who spread or aided the conspiracy theories that led to the attack. In total, Twitter banned more than seventy thousand QAnon-related accounts.

On January 10, the Professional Golfers' Association of America (PGA) exercised its contractual right to terminate its arrangement to host the 2022 PGA Championship at Trump National Golf Club in Bedminster, New Jersey, which had been awarded the tournament in 2014. The PGA said that it had "become clear that conducting the PGA Championship at Trump Bedminster would be detrimental to the PGA of America brand"; Trump had spent years trying to land a golf championship at one of his resorts. The next day, the R&A followed suit, saying it would not hold any of its championships "in the foreseeable future" at Trump Turnberry in Scotland. Also on January 10, Stripe announced it would stop processing online card payments to Trump's campaign for violating its terms of service against encouraging violence. Other companies reportedly seeking to cut ties with Trump include Deutsche Bank and Signature Bank.

=== Corporate suspensions of other accounts and programs ===
Twitter also banned accounts deemed to be "solely dedicated to sharing QAnon content", including those belonging to former national security adviser Michael Flynn and his son Michael Flynn Jr., attorneys Sidney Powell and L. Lin Wood (both of whom brought failed lawsuits challenging the election results), and former 8chan administrator Ron Watkins. Twitter's ban of Trump and others was criticized by some Trump allies, as well as some foreign leaders. (Note: Critics of social media companies who banned Trump included his political allies, such as his Donald Trump Jr.; Republican Senators Ted Cruz (TX) and Marco Rubio (FL), Republican Representatives Lauren Boebert (CO) and Marjorie Taylor Greene (GA), Secretary of State Mike Pompeo, and former ambassador to the United Nations Nikki Haley, as well as foreign political figures, specifically German chancellor Angela Merkel, Mexican president Andrés Manuel López Obrador, Russian dissident Alexei Navalny, Chechen leader Ramzan Kadyrov, and Eduardo Bolsonaro, son of Brazil's president Jair Bolsonaro.)

Also on January 8, Discord banned a pro-Trump server called "The Donald", which had ties to the banned subreddit r/The Donald. Discord cited the connection between the server and The Donald's online forum, which was used in planning the riot. Parler removed several posts from Wood espousing conspiracy theories and violent rhetoric, including a call for Vice President Pence and others to be subjected to firing squads, for violating community rules on speech encouraging violence. YouTube terminated two accounts belonging to former White House chief strategist Steve Bannon, including one hosting his "War Room" podcast, for repeated community guidelines violations pertaining to misinformation about widespread fraud or errors that affected the 2020 election's outcome.

On January 10, Parler, a microblogging and social networking service, with a significant user base of Donald Trump supporters, conservatives, conspiracy theorists, and far-right extremists was shut down after Amazon terminated its hosting services, saying that it had sent reports of 98 instances of posts that "clearly encourage and incite violence" to Parler in the weeks preceding the decision.

On January 12, Facebook and Twitter announced that they were removing content related to the "Stop the Steal" movement and suspending 70,000 QAnon-focused accounts, respectively.

Airbnb cancelled all reservations in Washington, D.C., for the week of January 20 (refunding affected hosts out of its own money), and deactivated accounts of any users who it found belonged to hate groups and/or participated in the attack.

The day of the attack, Cumulus Media, owner of several conservative talk radio programs through Westwood One, sent an internal memo directing its employees to stop questioning the outcome of the election on-air, on threat of being fired.

=== Revocation of Trump honorary degrees, contracts, and other connections ===
New York City Mayor Bill de Blasio in a video conference stated that Trump committed a "criminal act" and as such the city would terminate all contracts with the Trump Organization and would not do any business with them any longer. Specifically, New York City would take steps to terminate contracts with the Trump Organization to operate the Central Park Carousel, the Wollman & Lasker skating rinks, as well as the Ferry Point Golf Course. De Blasio stated that the city was working to find new vendors to take over the facilities to continue to provide services to customers. De Blasio ended that Trump would "no longer profit" with his relationship with New York City.

After the assault on the Capitol, Lehigh University and Wagner College revoked the honorary degrees they had conferred upon Trump in 1988 and 2004, respectively. The revocations of the honors left Liberty University as the only institution that gave an honorary degree to Trump. The board of the SAG-AFTRA voted "overwhelmingly" that probable cause existed to expel Trump from the entertainment union, to which Trump had belonged since 1989. The guild cited Trump's role in the January 6 riot at the Capitol, and his "reckless campaign of misinformation aimed at discrediting and ultimately threatening the safety of journalists, many of whom are SAG-AFTRA members". Trump later resigned from the union before the matter of his expulsion came before the union's disciplinary committee.

== Splintering of participant groups ==
The New York Times reported in March 2021 that the incident had caused groups like Proud Boys, Oath Keepers and the Groyper Army to splinter amid disagreements on whether the attack had gone too far or was a success, and doubts about the leadership of their organizations, reactivating concerns of increasing numbers of lone wolf actors who would be more difficult to monitor and might take more extreme actions.

== Political donors ==
Several large companies announced they were suspending all political donations. Others ceased funding the lawmakers who had objected to certifying Electoral College results and who became pejoratively known as the Sedition Caucus. However, some of them later reversed course. By November 2021, Republicans had fundraised more than Democrats. Republicans also fundraised more in the first nine months of 2021 than they had in the equivalent time periods in the election cycles 4 and 8 years earlier.

== Security measures ==
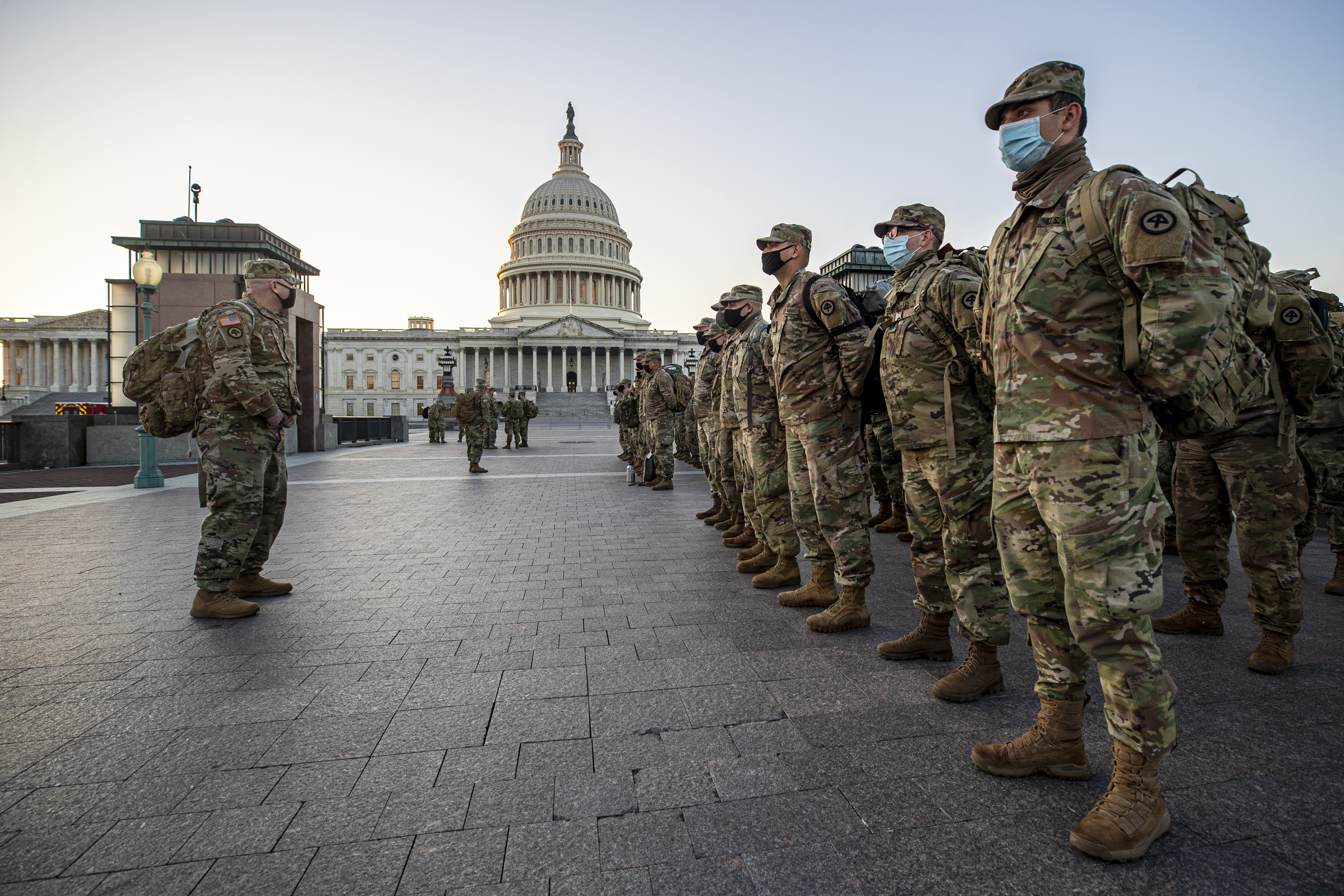
National Guardsmen at the Capitol building on January 12, 2021, in preparation for the inauguration of Joe Biden

Following the attack and increased incidents of harassment, members of Congress received additional security as they traveled through airports. Through Biden's inauguration, Capitol Police were to be stationed at D.C.-area airports (Reagan National, Baltimore-Washington, and Dulles) and the Transportation Security Administration (TSA) was to increase its screening of DC-bound air passengers.

On a private call on January 11, Capitol Police spoke with House Democrats about the possibility of making members of Congress pass through metal detectors for Biden's inauguration. Following the call, a lawmaker told HuffPost that concern had been raised about "all these [Congress] members who were in league with the insurrectionists who love to carry their guns". On January 12, acting House Sergeant-at-Arms Timothy Blodgett informed lawmakers that anyone entering the House chamber (including members of Congress) would have to pass through metal detectors. Security screening remained in place after Biden's inauguration. The House passed a rule on February 2 that anyone who did not complete the screening would be fined $5,000 for a first offense and $10,000 from a second offense, to be deducted from their salaries; within several days of the rule's passage, two Republican representatives were fined.

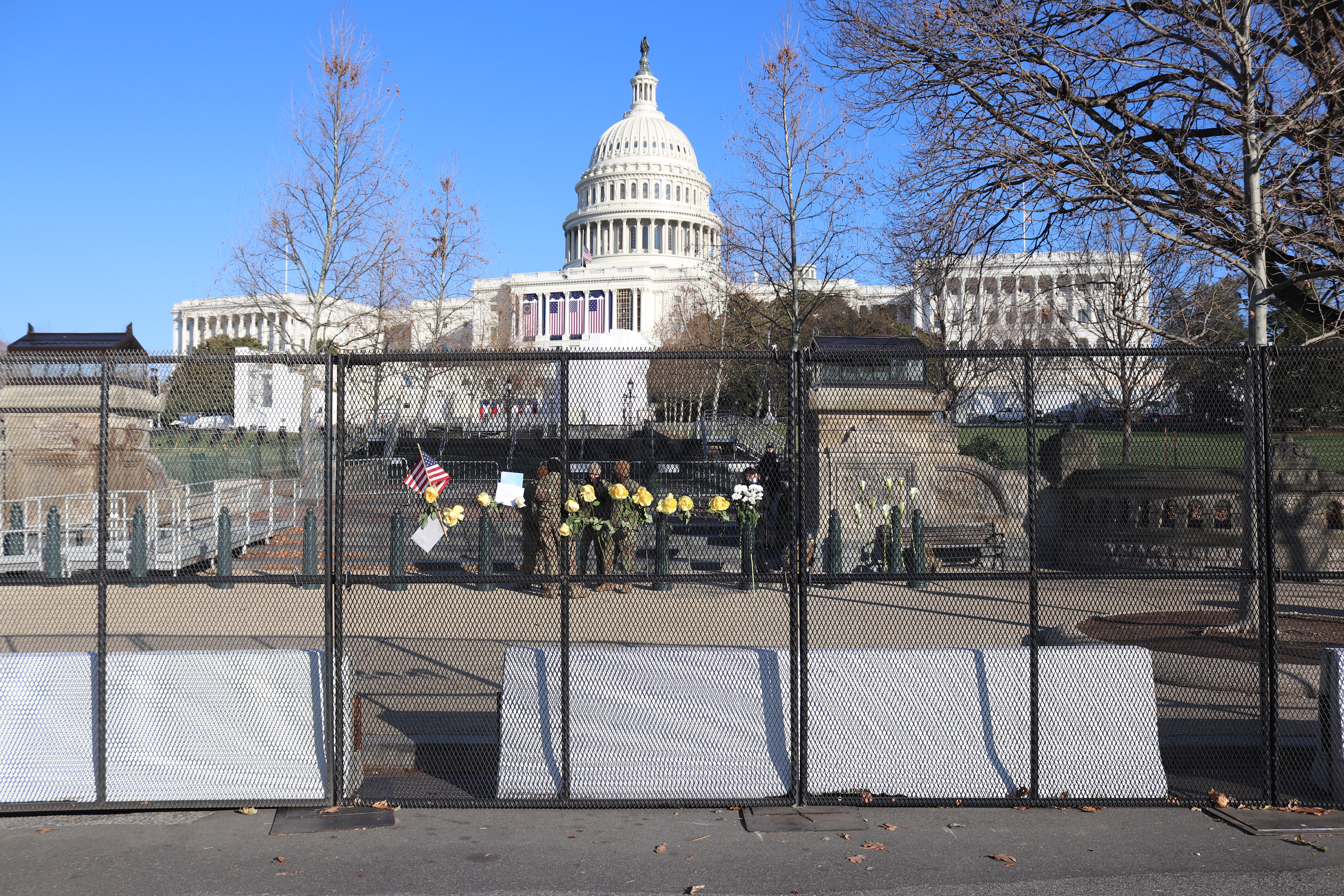
After the riot, a new security perimeter was established around the Capitol for Inauguration Day, including a "non-scalable" security fence.

Security was also put on high alert at the Capitol itself; a "non-scalable" security fence was placed around the Capitol and 6,200 members of the National Guard were expected to deploy to the national capital region by the weekend. A new security perimeter was created for the January 20 presidential inauguration, blocking off large portions of the city near Capitol Hill. The mayor announced parking facilities would be sealed off on January 15, and that delivery vehicles serving businesses in the security zone would be screened on entry. The Washington Metro announced it would close 11–13 subway stations from January 15 to 21 and re-route buses around the security zone to discourage people from traveling to the area. The night before the inauguration, 25,000 National Guard members arrived in Washington, D.C., and they were authorized to use lethal force.

=== Inauguration week protests ===
Minor protests occurred during inauguration week, which featured the participation of far-right militia groups that follow right-libertarianism, neo-fascism, neo-Nazism, white supremacism, and other ultranationalist or right-wing ideologies as well as members of the New Black Panther Party, and the QAnon and boogaloo movements.

=== Security concerns over March 4, 2021 ===
Starting in late January, QAnon adherents began expressing their beliefs that Trump would be re-inaugurated as the 19th President on March 4, the original date for presidential inaugurations until the passage of the Twentieth Amendment in 1933. This belief was adopted from a false aspect of sovereign citizen ideology that asserts there has not been a "legitimate" U.S. president since Ulysses S. Grant (whose first inauguration occurred on March 4, 1869) due to an 1871 law that supposedly turned the U.S. into a corporation. In February, it was reported that National Guard troops were expected to remain in Washington, D.C., through March 12 due to concerns over possible activity by QAnon adherents on March 4.

On March 2, it was reported that security measures were being added in Washington, D.C., in preparation for possible events on March 4. Despite these reports, the Capitol Police had advised lawmakers earlier that week that there was no indication of any protests or acts of violence in Washington, D.C., being planned. However, based on new intelligence that an identified but undisclosed militia group might attempt an attack on the Capitol building from that date to March 6, the agency issued an updated alert on March 3. House leadership subsequently rescheduled a March 4 vote to the previous night to allow lawmakers to leave town, though it later said the reschedule was not done out of security concerns. Meanwhile, the Senate did not follow suit, and it continued debating on the American Rescue Plan Act of 2021 as planned.

In addition to the Capitol Police advisory, the FBI and Department of Homeland Security issued a joint intelligence bulletin, featuring similar warnings of possible violence on March 4, to state and local law enforcement agencies across the U.S. on the previous day. The Associated Press reported that federal agents were monitoring hotel rooms, flight, and rental car reservation increases, as well as bus charters, for that day. It also reported a decline in online activity on some social media platforms regarding March 4, similar to another decline of online chatter leading up to the events of January 6.

Ultimately, March 4 passed without any serious incidents being reported. Afterwards, it was reported that the QAnon community had recently become skeptical of the March 4 theory. Prominent QAnon influencers did not treat the date with any significance unlike January 6, and some even dissuaded followers from participating in events scheduled on that date and accusing the news coverage about the date of being part of a false flag narrative designed to entrap them. Similar rhetoric had been observed prior to the January 6 riot and Biden's inauguration. According to Newsweek, some QAnon adherents rescheduled the purported date of Trump's re-inauguration to March 20, based on a misinterpretation of a 2019 act that "extends support provided by the General Services Administration to the president- and vice president-elect for up to 60 days after the inauguration"; it was also the 167th anniversary of the founding of the Republican Party.

Security was bolstered in Washington, D.C., in preparation for March 4, which QAnon adherents, adopting a false belief from sovereign citizen ideology, believed would be the day Trump was re-inaugurated as president. The House prematurely ended its work for the week following an announcement by the Capitol Police of intelligence on a "possible plot" by an identified militia group to breach the Capitol building on that day. Ultimately, March 4 passed without any serious incidents being reported.

=== Planned U.S. Capitol Police field offices ===
Responding to increased threats towards lawmakers and other security measures implemented in the wake of the riot, the United States Capitol Police announced plans to open field offices in the areas of San Francisco, California, and Tampa, Florida, on July 6. A police spokesperson also said other regional offices are being expected.

=== Concerns over "Justice for J6" rally ===
The Justice for J6 rally was a right-wing to far-right demonstration in Washington, D.C., in support of hundreds of people who were arrested and charged following the January 6 United States Capitol attack. It occurred on September 18, 2021. The event attracted 100–200 activists. It was organized by a former Donald Trump campaign staffer. The event was noted for extensive security preparations and concerns over possible unrest.

The event passed with minor incidents while remaining a generally peaceful small-scale demonstration. Four people were arrested before and after the rally, although D.C. police said they made no arrests related to the rally. Earlier in the day, two people were arrested for outstanding firearms violation warrants. One man arrested nearby was found to be in possession of a large knife. Another arrested 15 minutes after the rally, a US Customs and Border Protection officer, was found to be in possession of a gun but was not prosecuted.

=== Concerns over January 6, 2022 ===
In the days leading up to the first anniversary of the attack, federal and local law enforcement agencies began increasing security in anticipation of potential violence. Homeland Security Secretary Alejandro Mayorkas said that there is a "heightened level of [general] threat", but that the Department of Homeland Security (DHS) is unaware of any credible threats. On January 5, 2022, federal officials noted an increase in unspecified calls for violence and rebellion on forums frequented by domestic violent extremists, but none of them suggested a specific threat or a coordinated plan. Earlier, an intelligence assessment released on December 31, 2021, warned of "threat actors" taking advantage of the anniversary, with lone offenders being the most likely threat.

=== Concerns over the 2022 United States midterm elections ===
According to CNN, law enforcement officials and homeland security expected more extremist violence during the 2022 United States midterm elections.

== Legislation ==
=== Electoral Reform ===
In 2022, Congress passed the Electoral Reform Act to confirm the ministerial role of the Vice President.

=== Security bill ===
On May 20, the House passed a $1.9 billion Capitol security bill in response to the attack by a vote of 213–212. The bill would reimburse the National Guard and the District of Columbia, who have helped secure the Capitol, install new Capitol security features such as retractable fencing and hardened windows and doors, provide more funding for Capitol police, create a new force within the National Guard to respond to future emergencies at the Capitol, provide funding for the protection of lawmakers and federal judges, and provide funding for the prosecution of suspects in the riot. Unexpectedly, 3 progressive Democrats voted against the bill and another 3 voted "present", stating that they had concerns about Capitol Police accountability. The modified bill, with spending increased to $2.1 billion, was passed by Congress on July 29.

=== Anti-protest legislation ===
In the days following the attack on the Capitol, Republican politicians in at least three states introduced legislation creating new prohibitions on protest activity.

In Florida, a bill based on legislation proposed in response to the George Floyd protests against police brutality in summer 2020 was introduced by State Senator Danny Burgess on January 6. The bill, which would protect Confederate monuments; permit the state to overrule local governments' decisions to reduce funding for police; waive sovereign immunity for municipalities, thereby allowing local authorities to be sued for providing inadequate law enforcement; and block people injured while participating in protests from receiving damages, was described by Governor Ron DeSantis as an effort to prevent events like the Capitol attack. In Mississippi, a bill was introduced on January 7 that would criminalize blocking traffic, throwing objects, pulling down monuments, causing emotional distress, any activity by a group of six or more people that "disturbs any person in the enjoyment of a legal right", or aiding a person doing any of these; it would also prevent protesters from suing police, prevent municipalities from reducing funding for police, and expand the state's stand-your-ground law. In Indiana, a bill also introduced on January 7 would criminalize camping at the Indiana Statehouse, which was the site of protests in June 2020, and introduce mandatory sentences for anyone convicted of battery against a police officer or emergency service professional.

=== Law enforcement award bill ===
H.R. 3325 (An Act to award four congressional gold medals to the United States Capitol Police and those who protected the U.S. Capitol on January 6, 2021, Pub. L. 117–32 (text) (PDF), 135 Stat. 322, enacted August 5, 2021) was signed into federal law by President of the United States Joe Biden on August 5, 2021. It is a bill to award the Congressional Gold Medal to the police officers who defended the United States Capitol during the attack on January 6, 2021. The bill was first introduced in the House of Representatives on May 19, 2021. It was passed unanimously by the United States Senate on August 4, 2021. It was signed by the president on August 5, 2021, in a Rose Garden ceremony, attended by the officers' widows. The text of the bill specifically lauds Washington, D.C., police officer Jeffrey L. Smith and U.S. Capitol Police officers Howard Liebengood and Brian Sicknick, both of whom died after the insurrection. At its signing, President Biden also referenced U.S. Capitol Police Officer Billy Evans, who defended the Capitol on January 6 and was killed on duty during the Capitol car attack on April 2, 2021. Officer Evans' children were with Biden when he signed the bill.

=== Capitol Police ===
The Capitol Police Emergency Assistance Act of 2021 (S.3377) was signed into law on December 22, 2021, in response to security failures during the January 6 Capitol attack. The Act aims to improve security and emergency response at the U.S. Capitol by granting the Capitol Police Chief the authority to request emergency assistance directly from the National Guard and federal law enforcement agencies, eliminating the need for prior approval from the Capitol Police Board.

Additionally, the legislation also removes certain appointment requirements for special police officers and establishes increased oversight of the Capitol Police Board by Congress. The bill was introduced in May 2021, passed unanimously by both the Senate and the House in December 2021, and signed into law by President Joe Biden.

=== Proposed Unofficial Militia Restrictions ===
Three years after the attack, Congressman Jamie Raskin and Senator Ed Markey proposed the Preventing Private Paramilitary Activity Act on January 11, 2024, targeting the militia movement. If passed into law, it would federally prohibit "publicly patrolling, drilling, or engaging in [harmful paramilitary tactics]" and "falsely assuming the functions of law enforcement." The bill as of yet has not been codified into law.

=== House resolution ===
In February 2024, 63 House Republicans introduced a resolution declaring that Trump "did not engage in insurrection or rebellion against the United States."

== Lawsuits ==
On February 16, 2021, U.S. Representative Bennie Thompson (D-MS), the chairman of the House Homeland Security Committee, sued Donald Trump for conspiring to incite the violent assault at the Capitol. Thompson is represented by the NAACP. Also named defendants in the federal civil lawsuit are Trump's former personal lawyer Giuliani, the Proud Boys, and the Oath Keepers. The lawsuit alleges that the defendants violated the 1871 Ku Klux Klan Act by preventing Congress from carrying out its constitutional duties "by the use of force, intimidation, and threat". The law was first passed following the Civil War to combat the Ku Klux Klan violence against African Americans. On April 7, 2021, 10 more Representatives joined the suit as plaintiffs. Rep. Thompson subsequently withdrew from the suit, while the other plaintiffs moved forward.

On March 5, 2021, Representative Eric Swalwell filed suit against Donald Trump, Donald Trump Jr., Representative Mo Brooks, and Rudy Giuliani, also alleging that the defendants violated the Ku Klux Klan Act.

On March 30, 2021, Capitol Police officers James Blassingame and Sidney Hemby filed suit against Trump for physical and emotional injuries they suffered during the January 6 attack. They later amended their complaint, adding violation of the Ku Klux Klan Act and conspiracy to interfere with civil rights.

On August 13, 2021, the widow of Police Officer Jeffrey L. Smith and the Estate of Jeffrey L. Smith sued David Walls-Kaufman and Taylor Taranto for wrongful death, assault, battery, and aiding and abetting. Smith's counsel David P. Weber enlisted the assistance of online open source intelligence investigators to locate and identify the alleged assailants. The civil lawsuit was filed in the United States District Court for the District of Columbia. Both men were also criminally charged. In June 2022, Walls-Kaufman was arrested for his behavior during the Capitol riot, and in June 2023, he was sentenced to 60 days in prison. He is covered by Trump's January 2025 mass pardon of the rioters. Taranto was criminally charged for bringing weapons near former President Obama's home in 2023, and as Trump's mass pardon of the rioters doesn't cover that offense, he is likely to remain in prison.

On October 18, 2021, Trump filed a lawsuit against Thompson, the United States House Select Committee to Investigate the January 6 Attack on the United States Capitol, David Ferriero (Archivist of the National Archives) and the National Archives, seeking an injunction against the release of records related to communications made with the Trump administration on the day of the attack. The lawsuit claims the request and the committee are partisan shams and illegitimate. The lawsuit was eventually tossed after the Supreme Court denied a certiorari petition on February 22, 2022, allowing the select committee access to the documents.

On December 14, 2021, Washington D.C. Attorney General Karl Racine filed a lawsuit in District of Columbia's federal court, seeking damages from the Proud Boys and the Oath Keepers, claiming that both groups conspired to overturn the results of the 2020 in a coordinated act of domestic terrorism. The lawsuit seeks monetary damages for injuries, property damage, and additional costs.

Judge Amit Mehta consolidated three of the civil suits before him—Thompson v. Trump, Swalwell v. Trump, and Blassingame v. Trump—and held oral arguments on January 10, 2022, to consider whether Trump and the other defendants were immune from liability. The defendants had requested immunity on the grounds of the First Amendment, and those who were elected officials also claimed immunity based on that status. They asked the judge to dismiss the lawsuits. The judge, however, observed that Trump took no action for two hours on January 6. A "reasonable person" would have clarified his own message to stop the violence, the judge argued, yet Trump failed to "denounce the conduct immediately...and sent a tweet that arguably exacerbated things". On February 18, 2022, Mehta denied the motion to dismiss some of the claims, while granting the motion to dismiss other of the claims. Trump then appealed the cases to the District of Columbia Circuit Court of Appeals on July 27, 2022, claiming absolute immunity. The Court of Appeals ruled against him on December 1, 2023, allowing the civil suits to proceed.

Judge Mehta was scheduled to hear arguments for six more lawsuits related to January 6.

In November 2023, Jason Donner sued Fox News for firing him in September 2022. Donner had reported from inside the Capitol on January 6, 2021; as the building came under attack, he called the Fox News control room and complained that the network was "gonna get us all killed" if they kept making on-air claims downplaying the riot.

District Judge Sarah Wallace in November 2023 ruled that "Trump incited an insurrection on January 6, 2021", because he "acted with the specific intent to incite political violence and direct it at the Capitol with the purpose of disrupting the electoral certification". Wallace cited as relevant Trump's "history of courting extremists", his years-long effort of having "embraced the virtue and necessity of political violence", and his awareness that "his supporters were willing to engage in political violence" on his behalf. Wallace then quoted inflammatory rhetoric from Trump from January 6, 2021, where he said that this was "the most corrupt election in the history, maybe of the world", so his supporters could, as a "matter of national security", follow "very different rules" and "fight like hell", or they would not "have a country anymore". Despite this finding, Wallace declined to disqualify Trump from the Colorado primary ballot because Wallace ruled that the president is not an officer of the United States covered by the Fourteenth Amendment to the United States Constitution.

== Potential spread of COVID-19 ==
Public health experts have said that the riot was a potential COVID-19 superspreader event. Anthony Fauci, Director of the National Institute of Allergy and Infectious Diseases and lead member of the White House Coronavirus Task Force, said that the rioters' failure to "adhere to the fundamentals of public health" to prevent the spread of COVID-19—such as "universal wearing of masks, keeping physical distance, [and] avoiding crowds in congregate settings"—placed them at risk. The day after the event, Eric Toner, a senior scholar from the Johns Hopkins Center for Health Security, said the attack was "extraordinarily dangerous" from a public-health perspective.

== Impact and legacy ==
=== Contemporary analysis and terminology ===
A week following the attack, journalists were searching for an appropriate word to describe the event. According to the Associated Press, U.S. media outlets first described the developments on January 6 as "a rally or protest", but as the events of the day escalated and further reporting and images emerged, the descriptions shifted to "an assault, a riot, an insurrection, domestic terrorism or even a coup attempt". It was variably observed that the media outlets were settling on the terms "riot" and "insurrection".

According to NPR, "By definition, 'insurrection', and its derivative, 'insurgency', are accurate. 'Riot' and 'mob' are equally correct. While these words are not interchangeable, they are all suitable when describing Jan. 6." The New York Times assessed the event as having brought the United States "hours away from a full-blown constitutional crisis". Brian Stelter in CNN Business wrote that the events of the Capitol attack "will be remembered as an act of domestic terrorism against the United States". Although several of the rioters were charged with the crime of "seditious conspiracy", none of them were criminally charged with the crime of "insurrection", including Trump.

The attack was widely described as an attempted coup d'état or self-coup. Federal judge David Carter described Trump's actions as "a coup in search of a legal theory". Naunihal Singh of the U.S. Naval War College, and author of Seizing Power: The Strategic Logic of Military Coups, wrote that the attack on the Capitol was "an insurrection, a violent uprising against the government" and "sedition", but not a coup because Trump did not order the military "to seize power on his behalf". The Coup D'état Project of the Cline Center for Advanced Social Research at the University of Illinois, which tracks coups and coup attempts globally, classified the attack as an "attempted dissident coup", defined as an unsuccessful coup attempt "initiated by a small group of discontents" such as "ex-military leaders, religious leaders, former government leaders, members of a legislature/parliament, and civilians [but not police or the military]". The Cline Center said the "organized, illegal attempt to intervene in the presidential transition" by displacing Congress met this definition. Some political scientists identified the attack as an attempted self-coup, in which the head of government attempts to strong-arm the other branches of government to entrench power. Academic Fiona Hill, a former member of Trump's National Security Council, described the attack, and Trump's actions in the months leading up to it, as an attempted self-coup. Experts have differed about whether the events on January 6 amounted to a coup or the like, some say yes, some say no. News reporting about scholarly opinions reflects that division.

The FBI classified the attack as domestic terrorism. At the Senate Judiciary Committee meeting on March 2, 2021, Wray testified:

I was appalled, like you, at the violence and destruction that we saw that day. I was appalled that you, our country's elected leaders, were victimized right here in these very halls. That attack, that siege was criminal behavior, plain and simple, and it's behavior that we, the FBI, view as domestic terrorism. It's got no place in our democracy and tolerating it would make a mockery of our nation's rule of law.

The Congressional Research Service also concluded that the attack met the federal definition of domestic terrorism. Republican senator Ted Cruz characterized it as terrorism at least eighteen times over the ensuing year, though he was among the Senate Republicans who blocked a bipartisan January 6 commission to investigate it.

=== Commemorations ===
Signs, flags, stickers, Pelosi's damaged nameplate, and other items left behind from the riot will be preserved as historical artifacts in the collections of the House and Senate, and the National Museum of American History, and "shared with national museums", including the Smithsonians. On the morning of January 7, military history curator Frank A. Blazich Jr. volunteered to go to the National Mall where he spent three hours collecting an array of objects discarded along the National Mall, including a large repurposed street sign which read "STOP THE STEAL – OFF WITH THEIR HEADS", along with discarded protest signs, American flags, and other pro-Trump paraphernalia. Anthea M. Hartig, director of the Smithsonian's National Museum of American History, said the Smithsonian would seek to collect and preserve "objects and stories that help future generations remember and contextualize January 6 and its aftermath", a statement echoed by Jane Campbell, president of the Capitol Historical Society.

In March 2022, Congress mandated the display of a plaque honoring the police officers who were on duty at the Capitol during the attack. After numerous unexplained delays, Congress missed its self-imposed deadline of March 2023 to install the plaque. The plaque would have included the names of officers of the United States Capitol Police, the Metropolitan Police Department of the District of Columbia, and other federal and state agencies. It would have faced the west front of the complex. On June 12, 2025, former U.S. Capitol Police Officer Harry Dunn and D.C. Metropolitan Police Officer Daniel Hodges sued over House Speaker Mike Johnson's apparent abandonment of the project. The Justice Department sought to have the lawsuit dismissed. On the fifth anniversary of the riot, the Senate unanimously passed a resolution to display the plaque, which has a QR code to view the names of the officers, at a temporary location in the Senate wing of the Capitol. It was hung in just inside an entrance on the West Front of the Capitol in March 2026. The area is not open to the public. Later, it is to be moved to the west front of the Capitol, as specified by law.

In December 2022, a Congressional Gold Medal ceremony was held in the Capitol Rotunda, honoring the Capitol police and the Washington D.C. Metropolitan police; Democratic and Republican leaders from the Senate and House participated. One of the medals is displayed in a glass frame in the Capitol Visitor Center, along with a list of 20 law enforcement agencies that were involved in the response to the attack.

=== Media documentation ===
An hour-and-a-half unedited documentary film titled Full Video: The Siege On United States Capitol (Note: An edited version is titled Shooting and Storming of the US Capitol in Washington DC, later changed to The Insurrection of The United States Capitol.) was produced at the scene, and released on YouTube, by John Earle Sullivan, capturing many notable individuals and moments from the event, including the death of Ashli Babbitt. The author was deemed to be a participant to the civil disturbance and was charged with crimes.

Some recordings from Capitol surveillance cameras and DC Metropolitan police body cameras were made publicly available in June 2021, following a CNN-led lawsuit by major media outlets. The Justice Department had argued that releasing recordings of current defendants could interfere with their right to a fair trial.

A 2024 BBC documentary spliced together two moments in Trump's January 6 speech that in reality had been 54 minutes apart: his invitation "We're going to walk down to the Capitol" and his encouragement to "fight like hell". An internal memo drew attention to the splice as improper. After the memo was leaked in 2025, Trump's allies went on offense, and BBC director general Tim Davie and CEO of News Deborah Turness resigned on November 9. The next day, Trump accused the BBC of having tried to "interfere in the Presidential Election" and demanded that it give him $1 billion within four days.

==== Notable documentary films ====
- On June 30, 2022, The New York Times released Day of Rage: How Trump Supporters Took the U.S. Capitol, a 40-minute narrated documentary assembled from thousands of video and audio recordings from the event, much of the material recorded by rioters, with some being obtained through motions to unseal police body-camera footage.
- In October 2022, HBO released Four Hours at the Capitol, a documentary by Jamie Roberts that details the events of the attack.
- In December 2022, HBO released This Place Rules, a documentary directed by the Channel 5 presenter Andrew Callaghan.
- In January 2023, Discovery+ released January 6, a documentary by the French-American filmmakers Jules and Gédéon Naudet.

=== First anniversary ===
Commemoration of the attack was seen leading up to and on the one-year anniversary in 2022 by right-wing groups, supporters of Trump, politicians, and the general public. President Biden gave a speech to commemorate the attack, in which he described the rioters as "holding a dagger to the throat of America" and claims that Trump held "singular responsibility" for the attack as "his bruised ego matters more to him than our democracy, our Constitution".

Many lawmakers observed a moment of silence at the House of Representatives chamber. A majority of Republican lawmakers were absent, excluding Liz Cheney (R-Wyo) and her father, former Vice President Dick Cheney, who told reporters that the current Republican leadership did not resemble anything that he had seen ten years prior. Additional commemorative events were planned, including a moment of prayer, member testimonials, a prayer vigil, and a private event hosted by Pelosi, which thanked building staff for their protection during the attack.

There were protests planned to honor those who participated in the attack. A local chapter of the Proud Boys planned on holding a protest for all of those arrested afterwards, and an anti-mask protest planned in Beverly Hills was scheduled to be renamed after Ashli Babbitt.

=== Second anniversary ===
Biden marked the second anniversary of the attack in 2023 by holding an award ceremony, during which the Presidential Citizens Medal was handed out to 14 people, some posthumously, who battled against the attackers. The United States House of Representatives held a moment of silence to contemplate the attack.

=== Target letter to Trump and subsequent indictment ===
On July 16, 2023, Trump received a target letter from the Department of Justice Special Counsel Jack Smith, who investigated the events of January 6. Trump acknowledged that such a letter "almost always means an arrest and indictment" on his Truth Social account. Following Smith's special counsel investigation, an indictment on four charges was unsealed on August 1, 2023. These were conspiracy to defraud the United States under Title 18 of the United States Code, obstructing an official proceeding and conspiracy to obstruct an official proceeding under the Sarbanes–Oxley Act of 2002, and conspiracy against rights under the Enforcement Act of 1870. Following Trump's reelection in November 2024, Smith filed a motion to dismiss the case without prejudice, citing the DOJ's policy of not prosecuting sitting presidents. Smith reportedly plans to step down before Trump takes office. On November 25, 2024, Judge Tanya Chutkan approved the request and dismissed the charges.

=== 2024 election ===
In early October 2023, a poll by Survey USA found that 53 percent of Democratic voters, 45 percent of independent voters, and 42 percent of Republican voters expected serious violence after the 2024 presidential election.

On December 6, 2023, at a Republican presidential debate, candidate Vivek Ramaswamy asserted that "January 6 now does look like it was an inside job", by which he was falsely implying that it was orchestrated by federal agents.

A Washington Post/University of Maryland poll conducted December 14–18, 2023 asked people whether they believed the protesters nearly three years earlier had been "mostly violent". Most answered yes: 77 percent of Democrats, 54 percent of independents, and 18 percent of Republicans. This response for Democrats and independents resembled previous polls, but for Republicans it showed a decrease (as 26 percent of Republicans had answered yes in 2021). Polled on the same days, asked whether "FBI operatives organized and encouraged the attack", 34 percent of Republicans (and 44 percent of Trump voters) said yes, contrasted with 13 percent of Democrats (and 10 percent of Biden voters).

At a press conference on February 8, 2024, Donald Trump used the word "insurrection" to refer to the attack, and subsequently alleged that "it was an insurrection caused by Nancy Pelosi".

On June 13, Trump returned to Capitol Hill for the first time since the attack, meeting with Republican leaders at campaign headquarters. While Senate Minority Leader Mitch McConnell had ended in-person contact with Trump after the attack on the Capitol, he attended the meeting; it was their first in-person meeting together since the riot.

Trump embraced and celebrated the January 6 Capitol attack and promoted a revisionist history of the event. He continually brought it up during rallies and speeches for his 2024 campaign and made it a political rallying cry. He repeatedly called those charged for their actions on that day as "hostages" and "great, great patriots" and promised to pardon them if reelected (which he did immediately after his inauguration). He also called them "warriors" and "victims." He downplayed the events of that day, calling it a "beautiful day" with "so much love," and played a video of the attack during a rally in Waco, Texas with a choir of former January 6 rioters singing the song Justice for All, which also did at subsequent rallies and events. He spread baseless conspiracy theories at his rallies that "there was Antifa and there was FBI" at the riot. The New York Times stated that his comments "risked radicalizing his most die-hard supporters even further, encouraging them to repeat events like those that unfolded on Jan. 6." University of Chicago professor Robert Pape stated that Trump's comments on the attack "normalizes violence as a legitimate solution to political grievances."

In September 2024, following a request from Washington, D.C., mayor Muriel Bowser, the Department of Homeland Security designated the January 6, 2025, electoral vote certification as a National Special Security Event. This meant there would be extra planning and heightened security.

On November 3, Trump told a crowd that "I shouldn't have left [office]. I mean honestly, because we did so well."

On January 9, 2025, at Jimmy Carter's funeral, Trump and Pence briefly greeted each other, the first words they'd exchanged in years.

Trump was inaugurated on January 20, 2025. Shortly thereafter, he began raising the idea of serving a third term, which is constitutionally forbidden.

=== Limit of Sarbanes-Oxley Act based prosecutions ===
On June 28, 2024, the U.S. Supreme Court issued a 6–3 ruling which ruled in favor of defendant Joseph Fischer and found that a section of the 2002 Sarbanes-Oxley Act could not be used to bring obstruction charges against the January 6 defendants. Soon after the ruling, more January 6 prosecution cases would be reopened.

=== 2025 pardons and commutations ===
On January 20, 2025, upon assuming the presidency again, Trump issued roughly 1,500 pardons and 14 commutations to people charged in connection to the January 6 United States Capitol attack.

=== 2025 FBI leadership ===
Before Trump's inauguration, he announced he would nominate a new FBI director, and Christopher Wray resigned.

On February 21, 2025, Kash Patel became FBI director.

On February 23, Trump announced that podcaster Dan Bongino would be the next deputy director. A month earlier, Bongino had said on his podcast that he believed the FBI knew who planted the pipe bombs outside DNC and RNC offices the day before the Capitol attack, and that it had been "an inside job" intended as a false flag operation "to create a narrative that crazy MAGA people are trying to assassinate Kamala Harris". Under Bongino's leadership, in December, the FBI made an arrest in the pipe bomb case that did not comport with the "inside job" theory. Representative Barry Loudermilk, in his role as the chair of the House Select Subcommittee to Investigate the Remaining Questions Surrounding January 6, 2021, asked to interview the woman who had found the pipe bomb, reviving the "inside job" theory.

On September 26, 2025, Trump accused Wray of "LYING". The next day, he said there had been FBI agents at the "January 6th Protest, probably acting as Agitators and Insurrectionists". He said he wanted the names of the "so-called 'Agents'," for whose alleged behavior "Many Great American Patriots were made to pay a very big price only for the love of their Country."

=== 2025 consequences for federal prosecutors ===
By the end of February 2025, Ed Martin, the acting US attorney in Washington, DC, permanently demoted at least eight senior federal prosecutors to entry-level jobs. They had worked in the Justice Department's division of Federal Major Crimes and in the section of Fraud, Public Corruption and Civil Rights, and they had all worked on the Capitol riot cases.

=== Fifth anniversary ===
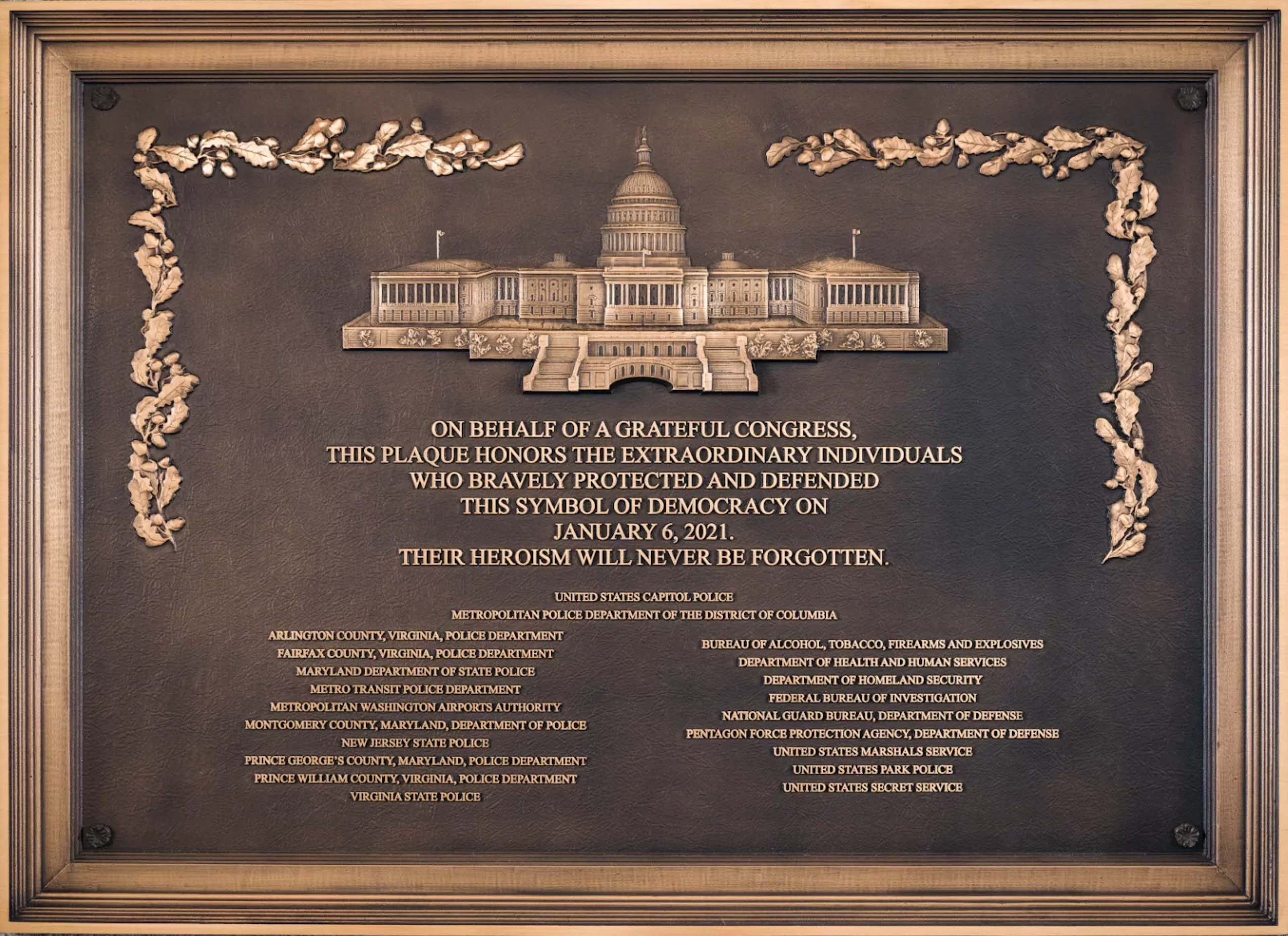
A commemorative plaque honoring those who protected the US Capitol on January 6 sat for years out of sight in the Capitol basement, surrounded by maintenance equipment. A 2022 law mandating the plaque stated it must be placed "at a permanent location on the western front". In March 2026, more than five years after the attack, it was placed on a wall inside the Capitol, in an area closed to all tours and accessible by visitors only if they are escorted.

On January 6, 2026, the members of the former January 6 House select committee held a hearing to reexamine their findings. Simultaneously, the Proud Boys, including Enrique Tarrio, gathered to march to the Capitol. The White House launched a webpage amplifying multiple false claims about the riot, praising Trump's pardons, claiming that Democrats "staged the real insurrection by certifying a fraud-ridden election", blaming Capitol Police for escalating the riot, and accusing Pence of "cowardice and sabotage". Representative Jamie Raskin published an opinion piece in The New York Times, in which he said: "It's still very much Jan. 6 in America. ... Mr. Trump's incoherent revisionist mythology of Jan. 6 has become an organizing policy commitment of his administration."

=== Copycat crimes ===
On June 29, 2026, 29-year-old Shane Cautillo of Boston, Massachusetts, was charged with one count of possession of a hoax incendiary device, possession of a hoax device or substance, unlawful possession of fireworks, and disorderly conduct on a public conveyance after allegedly making bomb threats and bringing explosives onto an MBTA Commuter Rail train on June 27. A witness reported that Cautillo had made loud comments about making bombs and giving them to extremist groups, terrorist groups, and the homeless, in addition to stating that he was inspired by the January 6 attack.
