= Philippines campaign =

Philippine campaign or Philippines campaign may refer to various events in the Philippine Islands, including:

== Military campaigns ==
=== Spanish colonial period (1565–1898) ===
- Numerous revolts against Spain during the Spanish colonial period; see Philippine revolts against Spain and Military history of the Philippines#Spanish colonial period (1565–1898)
- Various actions fought in the Philippines during the Eighty Years' War between Spain and the Netherlands; see "Eighty Years' War (1568–1648)" at Military history of the Philippines#Spanish colonial period (1565–1898)
- The Limahong Campaign (1573–1575), an attempt by the Chinese pirate Limahong to seize northern Luzon from Spanish authorities
- Various actions fought in the Philippines during the Seven Years' War (1756–1763) between European powers; see Military history of the Philippines#Spanish colonial period (1565–1898) and Seven Years' War#Other Continents
- The Philippine Revolution (1896–1898), called the "Tagalog Revolt" by the Spanish, a military conflict between the people of the Philippines and the Spanish colonial authorities which resulted in the secession of the Philippines from the Spanish Empire

=== American colonial period (1898–1941) ===
- The American operations of May–August 1898 to conquer the Philippines from Spain during the Spanish–American War; see "Philippines" under "Pacific" at Spanish–American War#Theaters of operation
- The Philippine–American War (1899–1902), sometimes known as the Philippine War of Independence, an armed military conflict between the Philippines and the United States
- The Moro Rebellion (1899–1913), a military conflict between Muslim Filipino revolutionary groups and the United States

=== World War II (1941–1945) and the Japanese occupation (1942–1945) ===
- The Philippines campaign (1941–1942), the World War II conquest of the Philippine Islands by Japan in 1941–1942 and the defense of the islands by Filipino and American forces
- The Philippine Commonwealth military and armed guerrilla resistance against occupying Japanese forces between 1942 and 1945 during World War II; see Japanese occupation of the Philippines
- The Philippines campaign (1944–1945), the World War II Allied campaign of October 1944 – August 1945 to defeat Japanese forces occupying the Philippine Islands

== Non-military uses ==
- The Campaign for Human Rights in the Philippines, a human rights watchdog group based in the United Kingdom
- The Philippine campaign against illegal drugs, or Philippine drug war, an intensified anti-drug campaign of 2016–2022

== See also ==
- Military history of the Philippines
- Philippine Campaign Medal
- Philippines campaign medals
