= ...And Justice for All =

"...And justice for all" are the last four words of the Pledge of Allegiance, an expression of loyalty to the country and flag of the United States of America.

And Justice for All may also refer to:

== Television ==
- ...And Justice for All (film), 1979, by Norman Jewison
- And Justice for All, a 1998 TV documentary movie by Michael Moore
- "And Justice For All" (Batwoman), a 2021 episode of the second season of The CW series Batwoman
- "And Justice For All...", a 2025 episode of Dexter: Resurrection

== Music ==
- ...And Justice for All (album), 1988, by Metallica
  - "...And Justice for All" (song), the album's title track
- "And Justice for All", a song from the Wu-Tang Killa Bees compilation album The Swarm (1998)

== Other ==
- The motto of the Campaign for Human Rights in the Philippines

== See also ==
- Justice for All (disambiguation)
