= Justice for All =

Justice for All may refer to:

== Music ==
- Justice for All!, a 1963 album by British singer Jimmy Justice
- "Justice for All" (song), a 2023 song by Donald Trump and the J6 Prison Choir

== Political parties ==
- Justice for All Party, a political party in Guyana
- Justice for All, the original name of the Man's Rights in the Family Party in Israel

== Television ==
- Justice for All (game show), a Hong Kong game show that debuted in 2005
- Justice for All with Judge Cristina Perez, an American dramatized court show that debuted in 2012
- "Justice for All" (TV pilot), a 1968 American television pilot and predecessor to All in the Family

== Other ==
- Phoenix Wright: Ace Attorney − Justice for All, a 2002 video game
- Justice for All, a 2018 film by Hector Echavarria

== See also ==
- ...And Justice for All (disambiguation)
