= Capitol Police Emergency Assistance Act of 2021 =

Act of the United States Congress

- Long title: An Act to empower the Chief of the United States Capitol Police to unilaterally request the assistance of the DC National Guard or Federal law enforcement agencies in emergencies without prior approval of the Capitol Police Board.
- Enacted by: the 117th United States Congress
- Effective: December 22, 2021

Citations
- Public law: Pub. L. 117–77 (text) (PDF)
- Statutes at Large: 135 Stat. 1522

Legislative history
- Introduced in the Senate as S. 3377 by Amy Klobuchar (D–MN) on December 13, 2021; Passed the Senate on December 13, 2021 (unanimous consent); Passed the House on December 14, 2021 (unanimous consent); Signed into law by President Joe Biden on December 22, 2021

The Capitol Police Emergency Assistance Act of 2021 (S.3377) is an Act of the U.S. Congress enacted on December 22, 2021, granting the Capitol Police chief authority to request emergency assistance from the National Guard and federal law enforcement agencies. It was passed in response to the January 6 attack on the U.S. Capitol.

== Background ==
During the January 6 United States Capitol attack, when supporters of President Donald Trump stormed the Capitol, the U.S. Capitol Police struggled to contain the mob due in part to delays in obtaining National Guard support. Under the existing policy at the time, the Capitol Police Chief needed prior approval from the Capitol Police Board, a four-member panel, to request National Guard assistance. This requirement contributed to delays in the deployment of reinforcements.

=== Bipartisan report ===
A bipartisan report released in June 2021 by the Senate Rules and Homeland Security Committees highlighted critical failures in the security protocols on January 6. The report stated that the events “clearly demonstrated the need for the Chief of the Capitol Police to have more unilateral flexibility to quickly request assistance in an emergency.”

It also found that “none of the members of the Capitol Police Board appeared fully familiar with the process or requirements relating to emergency declarations or requesting external support,” leading to delays in the deployment of the National Guard both on and before January 6. The report was key to creating the political will for granting the Capitol Police Chief the authority to request emergency assistance directly, without requiring prior approval from the Capitol Police Board.

=== Testimonies ===
Former Capitol Police Chief Steven Sund, who resigned following the attack, testified in February 2021 that his requests for National Guard assistance were denied by the House and Senate Sergeants at Arms. Sund argued that “in exigent circumstances, there needs to be a streamlined process for the Capitol Police Chief to have authority.”

This sentiment was echoed by then-Commander of the D.C. National Guard, Gen. William J. Walker, who testified that his ability to deploy troops was restricted by a memo requiring approval from the Secretaries of the Army and Defense before responding to a civil disturbance.

=== Aftermath ===
In the aftermath, congressional leaders and security experts called for reforms to improve the Capitol Police's ability to respond swiftly to crises. As such, the Capitol Police Emergency Assistance Act of 2021 was crafted to address these issues by streamlining decision-making during emergencies. The legislation was based on recommendations from the bipartisan Senate report and law enforcement testimonies.

Senator Amy Klobuchar (D‑MN), chairwoman of the Senate Rules and Administration Committee, emphasized the urgency of the reforms, stating, “Our report found that Capitol Police officers and their law enforcement partners were left alone to defend the Capitol and our democracy itself from violent insurrectionists, while the Chief of the Capitol Police was delayed in obtaining approval to request help from the National Guard.” Co-sponsor Senator Roy Blunt (R‑MO) also noted that the legislation was “part of our ongoing effort to strengthen Capitol security moving forward.”

== Provisions ==
The core provision of the legislation authorizes the Chief of the Capitol Police to request the assistance of federal agencies during emergencies.

- Authority to Request Emergency Assistance: The bill authorizes the Chief of the U.S. Capitol Police to request emergency assistance directly from executive departments and agencies, including the D.C. National Guard and federal law enforcement agencies, to prevent significant disruptions of governmental functions and public order at the U.S. Capitol. This provision eliminates the need for prior approval from the Capitol Police Board.
- Special Police Officers’ Appointment Requirements: The legislation removes statutory qualification and approval requirements for law enforcement and uniformed service personnel appointed as special police officers. This change allows for quicker deployment of additional security personnel during emergencies initiated by the Capitol Police Chief.
- Approval of Special Police Regulations: Under the Act, regulations governing special police officers, as prescribed by the U.S. Capitol Police Board, are now subject to approval by the Speaker of the House and the Senate Majority Leader. This updates the previous requirement, which mandated approval from the Speaker and the President pro tempore of the Senate.
- Congressional Oversight: The act mandates that the Senate Committee on Rules and Administration and the House Committee on House Administration jointly conduct at least one oversight hearing of the U.S. Capitol Police Board during each Congress.

The provisions are structured around 3 main legislative changes to address vulnerabilities from the January 6 attack: streamline emergency procedures, improve security coordination, and enhance oversight of the U.S. Capitol Police.

== Legislative history ==
S.3377 was introduced in the Senate on May 27, 2021, by Senator Amy Klobuchar (D‑MN), with bipartisan support from 8 other senators. The bill was referred to the Senate Committee on Rules and Administration, where it underwent initial review and discussion.

After deliberations, the bill was reported out of the committee without amendments. On December 14, 2021, the Senate passed the bill by unanimous consent.

Following Senate approval, the bill was sent to the House of Representatives, where it was considered under suspension of the rules, a streamlined process for passing legislation with broad bipartisan support. The House passed the legislation unanimously on December 21, 2021.

President Joe Biden signed the Capitol Police Emergency Assistance Act of 2021 into law on December 22, 2021.

== Reactions ==
United States Capitol Police Chief J. Thomas Manger said the Department is “grateful for the additional safety measure” provided by the Act.

== See also ==
- U.S. Capitol Police
- January 6 United States Capitol attack
- Law enforcement response to the January 6 United States Capitol attack
