= Naunihal Singh (academic) =

American political scientist

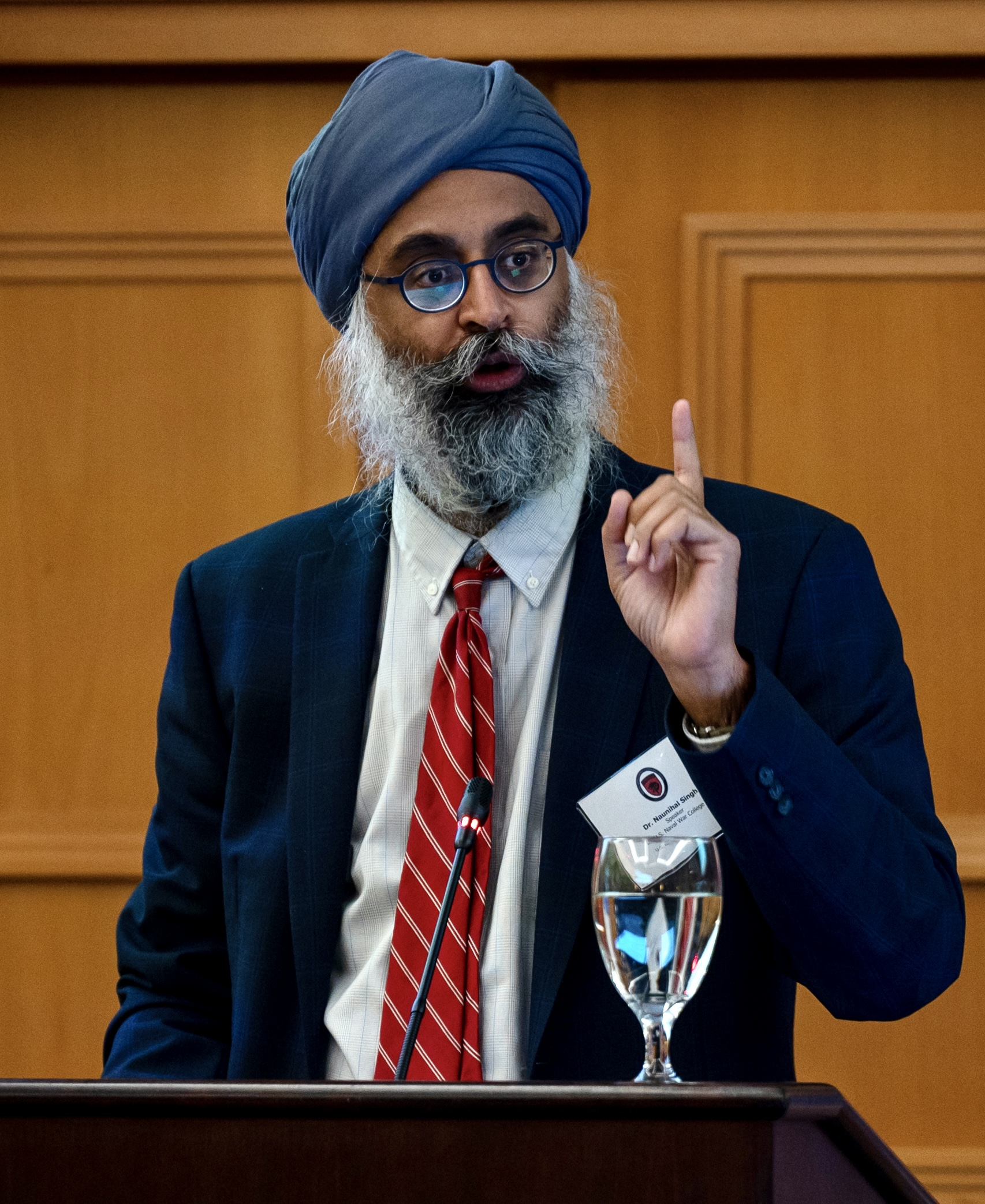
- Singh in 2022
- Born: New York City
- Education: Yale College B.S. Harvard University Ph.D.
- Occupation: Political scientist
- Employer: Naval War College
- Notable work: Seizing Power: The Strategic Logic of Military Coups
- Title: Associate professor

Naunihal Singh is an American political scientist. He is the author of Seizing Power: The Strategic Logic of Military Coups (2014) and serves as Associate Professor of National Security Affairs at the Naval War College.

== Early life, career and education ==
Singh was born in New York City. He studied computer science and political science at Yale University, earning a B.S. in 1992. After college, he worked at Oracle on a project for the US Navy, then for Human Rights Watch to help gather evidence used to form an international coalition to prosecute Saddam Hussein for war crimes. While the project was unsuccessful in prosecuting Hussein, it did contribute to the establishment of the International Criminal Court. He next earned his PhD in government from Harvard University in 2005.

== Academic career ==
After earning his doctorate, Singh taught for eight years at the Kellogg Institute at University of Notre Dame before becoming professor of African Political Studies at the Air War College of Air University. Singh is now Associate Professor of National Security Affairs at the Naval War College.

In 2014, he published Seizing Power: The Strategic Logic of Military Coups with Johns Hopkins University Press. The book surveys coup attempts (both successful and failed) around the world from 1950 to 2000, and in particular examines seven coup attempts that took place in Ghana between 1967 and 1981. Drawing on game theory, Singh argues that a pivotal factor in a coup's success or failure is not its intrinsic popularity but rather its leaders' ability to persuade others that the coup is broadly supported and likely to succeed, while any resistance is negligible and unlikely to prevail. Consequently, seizing control of radio facilities, for instance, can be important as a way to project the impression of the coup's solidified control.
