= Justice for All (song) =

Single by Donald Trump and the J6 Prison Choir
- Released: March 3, 2023
- Genre: Choral music; spoken word
- Length: 2:20

Music video
- "Justice for All" at Rumble

"Justice for All" is a charity record by Donald Trump and the J6 Prison Choir, a choir of about 20 men imprisoned for their involvement in the January 6 United States Capitol attack. It was announced that profits from the song would be used for the legal aid of people incarcerated for the attack.

== Background ==
On January 6, 2021, pro-Trump protestors gathered outside the United States Capitol, with some forcefully entering, in an attempt to interfere with the certification of the election of Joe Biden. One person, a protestor named Ashli Babbitt, was shot and killed by US Capitol Police. There were claims that the protest caused nine deaths after the fact, including law enforcement suicides, and around 1,000 people were charged with crimes in connection to the attack. A 2021 review found that during the attack, approximately 1,000 assaults on law enforcement personnel took place. After the attack, Trump admitted to financially supporting those charged with crimes and had promised to consider issuing full pardons to rioters in the future. At the beginning of his second term, Trump fully pardoned most rioters involved with crimes on January 6.

The project was reportedly organized by conservative commentator and former Fox News host Ed Henry and Music Executive LJ Fino. Forbes reported that the recipients would "be vetted to ensure funds do not go to anyone who assaulted police officers" during the attack. They also said the record "was reportedly produced by a major recording artist who was not identified".

== Content ==
The song consists of Trump reciting the Pledge of Allegiance to the flag of the United States of America interspersed with the J6 Prison Choir singing "The Star-Spangled Banner" with an ambient backing track. The song finishes with the choir chanting "U-S-A!" six times. The Pledge of Allegiance portion was recorded at Trump's home at Mar-a-Lago, while the choir's singing was recorded through a prison phone.

== Music video ==
A music video premiered on Steve Bannon's podcast War Room; it shows footage of Trump "performing patriotic acts during his presidency" and footage of the January 6 United States Capitol attack. The music video later appeared on Rumble and Locals on March 9 and March 10, respectively. The D.C. Department of Corrections is investigating because detainees are prohibited from using video-sharing platforms.

== Reception ==
Barb McQuade, a University of Michigan law professor and former attorney, called the song "a disinformation tactic right out of the authoritarian playbook". Some online users reacted negatively as well, calling Trump "narcissistic" for the song. The song was used in an opener in Trump's first 2024 campaign rally in Waco, Texas.

A YouTube upload of the single, released on March 4, 2023, had been viewed 504,000 times by March 13. As of September 2024, that video was no longer available on YouTube, but showed a total viewing count of 1,253,000 views. Forbes described the record sales as "impressive". Billboard magazine described the record's sales success and chart-topping status.

== Charts ==
=== Weekly charts ===
Weekly chart performance
| Chart (2023) | Peak position |
|---|---|
| US Bubbling Under Hot 100 Singles (Billboard) | 4 |
| US Digital Song Sales (Billboard) | 1 |

=== Year-end charts ===
Annual chart rankings
| Chart (2023) | Rank |
|---|---|
| US Digital Song Sales (Billboard) | 41 |

== See also ==
- Justice for J6 rally
