= Campaign for Human Rights in the Philippines =

The Campaign for Human Rights in the Philippines (CHRP) is a small but highly active human rights watchdog based in the United Kingdom. It has the backing of the British T.U.C, Amnesty International, and several educational institutions including a very close relationship with the School of Oriental and African Studies.

It is run by volunteers and has the support of cross-party members of both the House of Lords and House of Commons.

Its aim is to highlight the 900+ extrajudicial political killings in the Philippines, and the second highest (to Iraq) murder rate of journalists in the world. Its motto, '... and justice for all', not only refers to the Philippine Constitution but to the fact that no one has been convicted of the extrajudicial killings in the Philippines.

It is currently aiming to highlight Prince Andrew's involvement with mining in the Philippines, and with the Philippine government. Both of which groups have been linked to killings in the country.

Recent activity includes a successful protest against the arrival of President Gloria Macapagal Arroyo, and her visit with Prince Andrew in his capacity as an ambassador for British business, and especially for companies interested in exploiting the country's mining and energy resources. The Guardian states that Amnesty highlighted political killings and disappearances, torture and arbitrary arrests, which may be one reason why the visit has been kept low-key, unlike at the president's previous port of call in Spain, where she was publicly feted by King Juan Carlos.
