= United States Coast Guard Police =

Law enforcement unit within the United States Coast Guard

- Flag of the U.S. Coast Guard
- Abbreviation: CGPD
- Motto: "Service, Integrity, Justice!"

Jurisdictional structure
- Federal agency: United States
- Operations jurisdiction: United States
- General nature: Federal law enforcement; Military provost

Operational structure
- Parent agency: United States Coast Guard

The United States Coast Guard Police (CGPD) are law enforcement units stationed at certain shore facilities of the United States Coast Guard.

The CGPD is made up of Active Duty, Civil Service Civilian, and Civilian Contract members, who serve together as CGPD personnel.

== Structure ==
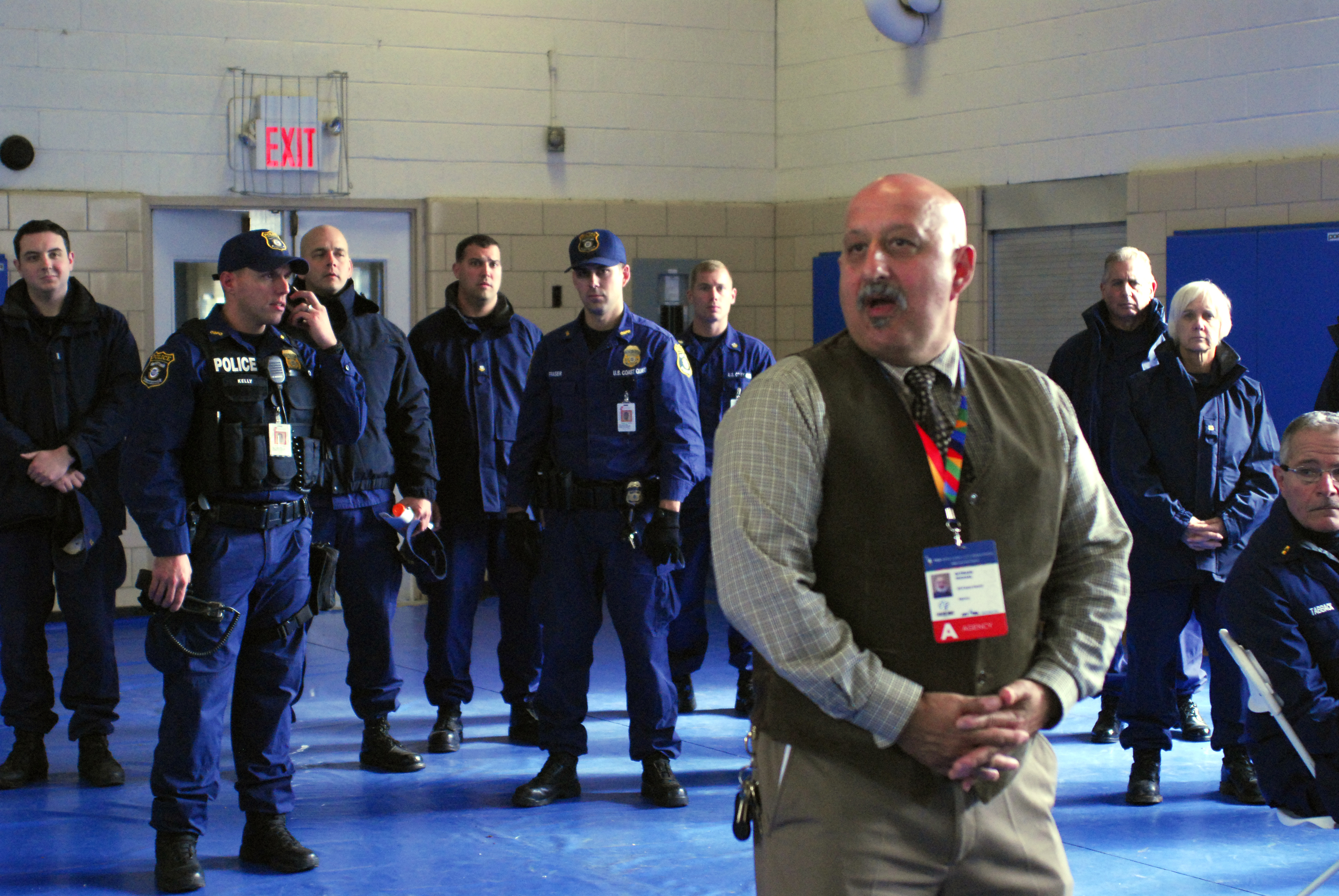
Coast Guard police debriefs on operations for the 2014 TCS New York Marathon

CGPDs are overseen by a Command Security Officer, who is responsible for physical security aboard shoreside facilities .

The position of Chief of Police is usually held by a Chief Warrant Officer (W-2) or Chief Petty Officer (E-7), who oversees the day-to-day activities of a CGPD.

A Petty Officer First Class (E-6) usually holds the position of Deputy Chief of Police. Shift supervisors are usually assigned by seniority.

"Police officers" usually consist of Coast Guardsmen with the rank of E-3 to E-7. CGPD personnel attend formal law enforcement training through the United States Coast Guard Training Center Cape May.

Select personnel may also attend advanced training.

== Uniform and Equipment ==
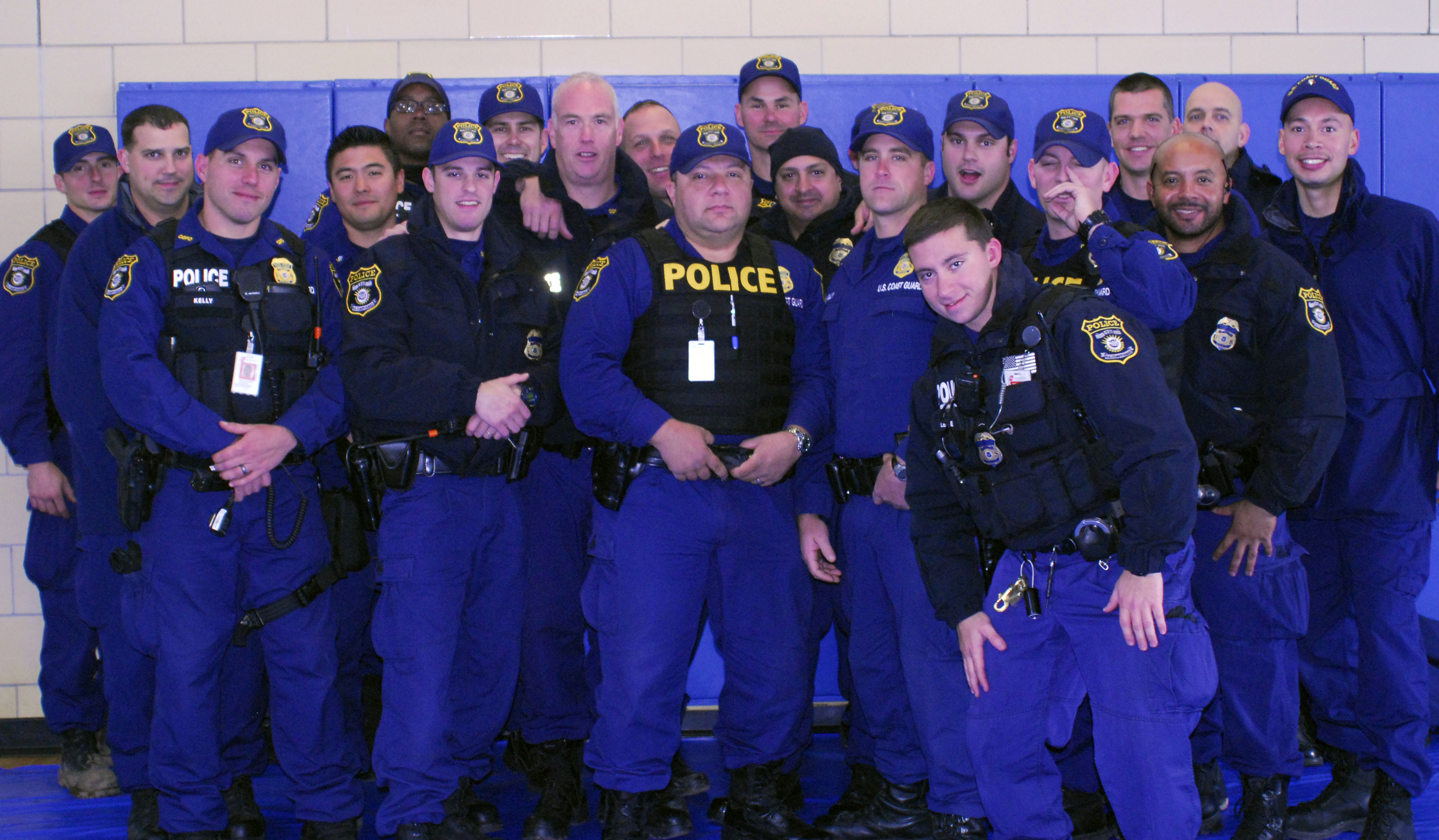
"Sector New York" Coast Guard Police Department at the 2014 TCS NYC Marathon

Officers wear a modified Operational Dress Uniform (ODU) with "CGPD" collar devices in lieu of their rank.

There is a CGPD shoulder patch worn on both shoulders, a CGPD badge/shield worn on the left breast and the CGPD patch repeated on the blue baseball cap.

Sometimes, equipment vests with "USCG," "USCG POLICE," or simply "POLICE" are worn over the top.

CGPD personnel carry the following equipment, for law-enforcement duties:

- SIG Sauer P229R DAK .40 S&W
- baton
- handcuffs
- radio.

Marked police vehicles are also used

== See also ==
- Department of Defense police
- Maritime Law Enforcement Academy
- Maritime Law Enforcement Specialist
- U.S. Coast Guard Intelligence
- U.S. Coast Guard Investigative Service (CGIS)
- United States Air Force Security Forces
- Department of the Air Force Police (civilian)
- United States Army Military Police Corps
- Department of the Army Police (civilian)
- Master-at-arms (United States Navy)
- Department of the Navy Police (civilian)
- United States Marine Corps Police (civilian)
