= Department of the Navy Police =

Civilian-staffed law enforcement program of the U.S. Navy

- Abbreviation: US Navy Police, US Navy Security Forces, DON Police

Jurisdictional structure
- Federal agency: United States
- Operations jurisdiction: United States
- General nature: Federal law enforcement; Military provost

Operational structure
- Sworn members: Police Officer (Federal Civil Service GS-0083)
- Parent agency: Department of the Navy

The United States Department of the Navy Police (DoN Police) is the uniformed security police program of the United States Navy. It provides professional, civilian, federal police officers to serve and protect U.S. Navy personnel, properties, and installations. DoN Police personnel represent the Department of the Navy's contribution to the Department of Defense police program. DoN Police officers primarily work alongside U.S. Navy masters-at-arms, the military police of the U.S. Navy. Although under the Department of the Navy, the United States Marine Corps (USMC) maintains its own civilian law enforcement program for Marine Corps-centric installations, the USMC Civilian Police. Despite both employing civilian special agents, neither the Naval Criminal Investigative Service nor the USMC Criminal Investigation Division fall-under the auspices of the DoN/DoD Police; both agencies have their own chains of command.

== Duties ==
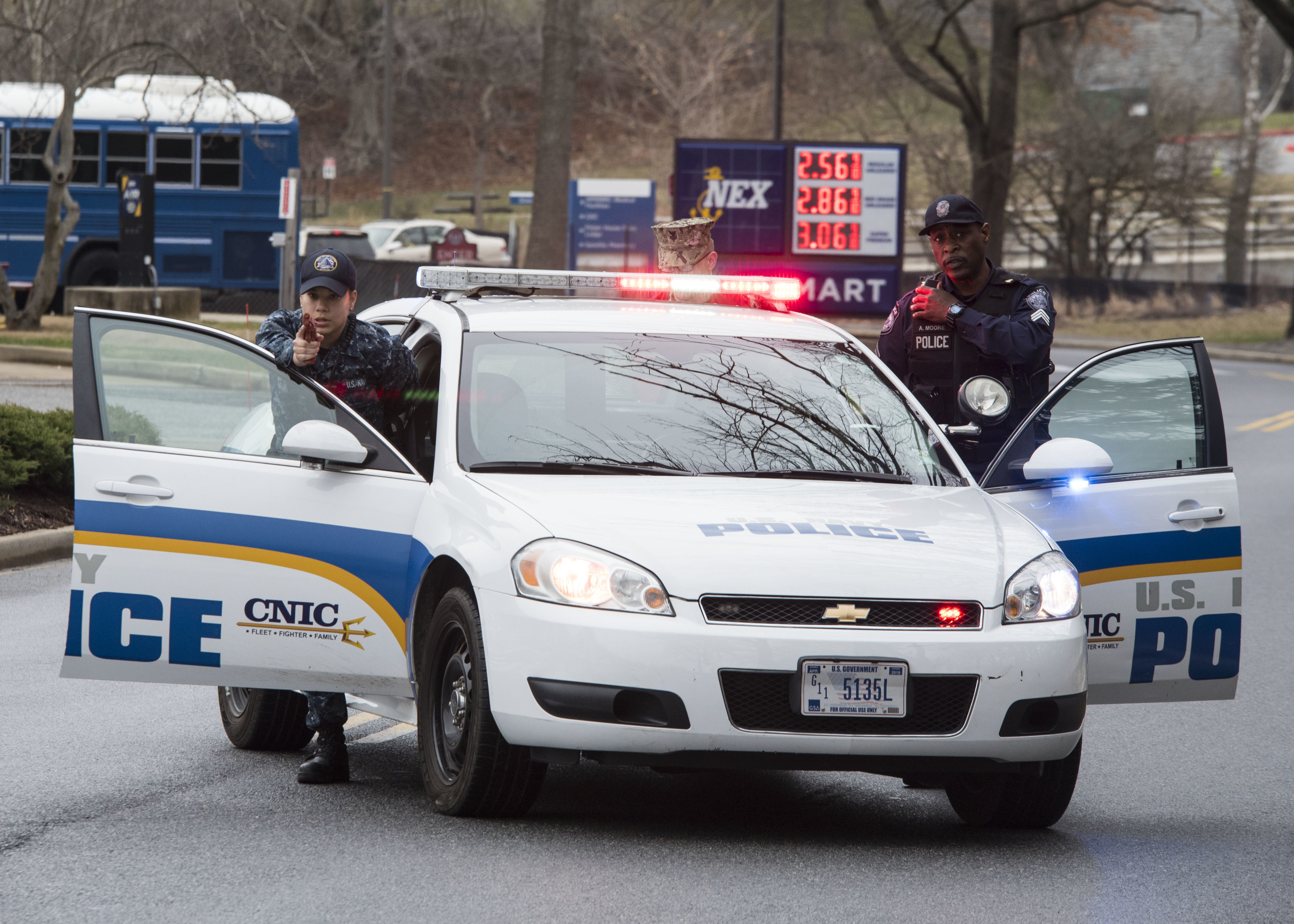
A DoN Police sergeant (right) working alongside a USN master-at-arms (left) during a counterterrorism training exercise at Naval Support Activity Bethesda

The DON Police carry out the following duties:

- law enforcement,
- force protection,
- physical security

and antiterrorism missions.

== See also ==
=== Military criminal investigative organizations ===
- Defense Criminal Investigative Service (DCIS)
- United States Air Force Office of Special Investigations (AFOSI or OSI)
- United States Army Counterintelligence (ACI)
- United States Army Criminal Investigation Division (USACID or CID)
- Naval Criminal Investigative Service (NCIS)
- United States Marine Corps Criminal Investigation Division (USMCCID)
- Coast Guard Investigative Service (CGIS)

=== Federal law enforcement ===
- List of United States federal law enforcement agencies
- Master-at-arms (United States Navy)
- Shore Patrol (USN and USMC)
- Criminal Investigation Task Force (CITF)
- Department of Defense Police
- Department of the Army Civilian Police
- Department of the Air Force Police
- United States Marine Corps Civilian Police
- United States Coast Guard Police
- National Oceanic and Atmospheric Administration Fisheries Office of Law Enforcement (NOAA OLE)
- U.S. Coast Guard (USCG)
- U.S. Diplomatic Security Service (DSS), State Department

=== JAG Corps ===
- Judge Advocate General's Corps, U.S. Navy
- U.S. Marine Corps Judge Advocate Division

=== Intelligence ===
- Marine Corps Intelligence Activity
- Marine Corps Counterintelligence
- Office of Naval Intelligence (ONI)
- Coast Guard Intelligence (CGI)
