= Facer =

Facer may refer to:

== Geography ==
- Facer, St. Catharines city of St. Catharines, Ontario

== Machinery ==
- rotating pipe cutter
- Advanced Facer-Canceler System used by the US Postal Service to cull, face, and cancel letter mail

== People ==
- Frank Facer, Australian rugby league footballer and administrator
- Jada Facer, American actress
- Cecil Facer Secondary School

== Businesses ==
- Facer (app), a watch face platform

== Music ==
- Facer (song), a 1995 single by German band X Marks the Pedwalk
