= AFCS =

AFCS may refer to:

- A.F.C. Sudbury, an English football team
- Advanced Facer-Canceler System, a range of machines used for sorting, labeling, coding and postage canceling of mail
- Aircraft flight control system
- Air Force Civilian Service
- Atlanta–Fulton County Stadium, a former stadium in Atlanta, Georgia
- Automated fare collection system
- Automatic flight control system, commonly known as an autopilot
