= Department of Defense police =

Civilian-staffed law enforcement personnel of the U.S. DoD

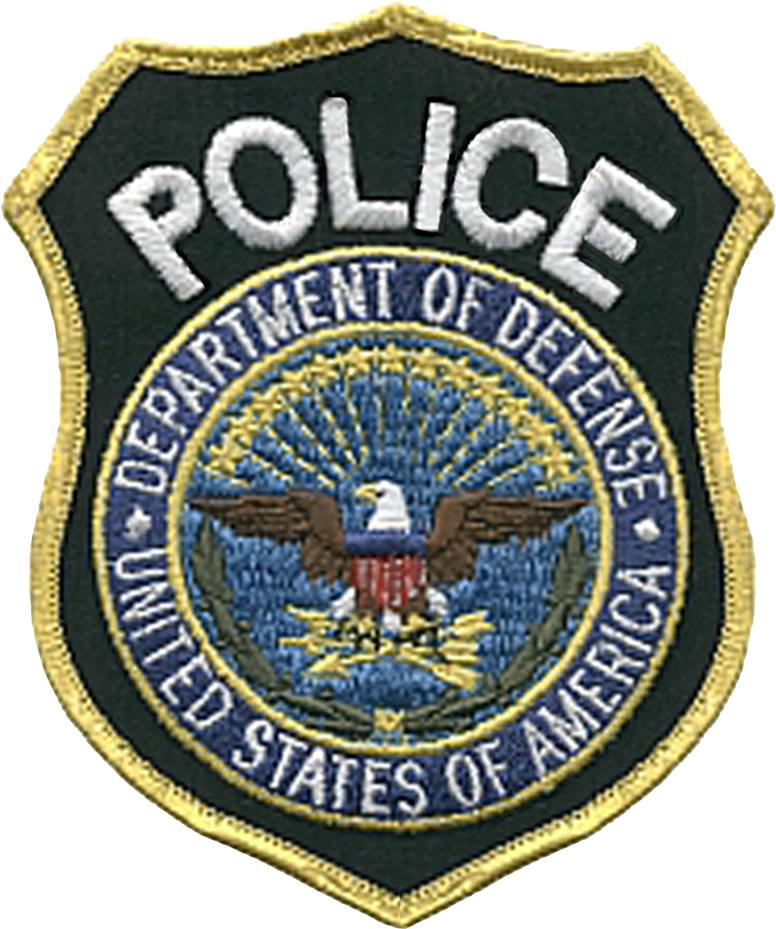
Department of Defense police patch

United States Department of Defense police (or DoD police) are the uniformed civilian security police officers of the United States Department of Defense (DoD), various branches of the United States Armed Forces, or DoD agencies (e.g. the Defense Logistics Agency Police).

The DoD police are responsible for law enforcement and security services on DoD-owned and leased buildings, facilities, properties and other DoD assets. Law enforcement services on properties owned or controlled by one of the component departments of the DoD is the responsibility of the appropriate component agency of the DoD police; either the Department of the Army Police, Department of the Navy Police, or the Department of the Air Force Police. Despite falling under the Department of the Navy, the United States Marine Corps maintains its own civilian police force, the United States Marine Corps Civilian Police, answerable directly to the United States Marine Corps rather than the DoD.

As the United States Coast Guard (USCG) falls under the Department of Homeland Security in peacetime, the USCG Police reports directly to the senior leadership of the USCG and is therefore not a DoD police agency.

The various military police personnel of the DoD's armed services – the Military Police Corps of the United States Army, the masters-at-arms of the United States Navy, the Security Forces of the United States Air Force and Space Force, and the Military Police of the United States Marine Corps – are answerable directly to their component departments and do not fall under the "DoD police" umbrella. DoD police law enforcement officers, while being federal employees, are not members of the military.

== Organization and oversight ==
There is no centralized, singular "Department of Defense police" agency; Rather, "DoD police" is an umbrella term that refers to the majority of civilians engaged in (primarily uniformed) policing duties for the Department of Defense and its component branches. An exception to this are civilians employed by the "military criminal investigatory organizations" (MCIOs); the Defense Criminal Investigative Service (DCIS), the Department of the Army Criminal Investigation Division (CID), the Naval Criminal Investigative Service (NCIS) and the Department of the Air Force Office of Special Investigations (OSI). As the United States Coast Guard does not normally fall under the Department of Defense, the USCG's criminal investigatory agency – the Coast Guard Investigative Service (CGIS) – is not considered a MCIO. Civilians, including law enforcement officers (LEOs), of the MCIOs are not considered "DoD police." The DoD police, however, have their own investigative capacity, usually in the form of plainclothes or semi-uniformed investigators or detectives. Such investigative capacity is typically limited to misdemeanors and minor felonies; More serious, larger, or more complex investigations are undertaken by the appropriate MCIO(s).

As there is no singular DoD police agency proper, personnel are typically assigned to and organized by individual military installations. Each installation will have its own "DoD police department," each with their own chain of command. Departments' chiefs typically report to the head of law enforcement and security of each installation, typically the provost marshal or equivalent, though on small- to medium-sized installations this position may be amalgamated under the deputy installation commander or similar senior post.

Each department is quasi-autonomous and the DoD police are overseen and managed by the Chief of the Law Enforcement Division, under the Director for Defense Intelligence (Counterintelligence, Law Enforcement & Security) who, in-turn, reports to the Under Secretary of Defense for Intelligence and Security. In an effort to mirror ongoing efforts within the United States to standardize training standards across various jurisdictions, the DoD stood-up their own Peace Officer Standards and Training (POST) Commission in 2021. The POST Commission, under the direction of the aforementioned DoD Chief of Law Enforcement, certifies that the various DoD police agencies meet DoD and other federal standards, regulations, and laws. Such standards are broadly defined by DoD Instruction 5525.15 Law Enforcement Standards and Training in the DoD.

In a further effort to mirror attempts occurring across the United States aiming to enhance oversight, promote transparency, and ensure accountability, the 117th Congress passed the Joseph Maxwell Cleland and Robert Joseph Dole Memorial Veterans Benefits and Health Care Improvement Act of 2022 on 29 December 2022. The Act, among other provisions, statutorily requires all DoD police and Department of Veterans Affairs Police (VA Police) LEOs to utilize body-worn cameras at virtually all times when on-duty, apart from certain limited circumstances. This was codified into federal law as 38 U.S.C. § 902(a)(3) and came into force on 27 June 2023. The VA Police does not fall-under the DoD police umbrella, as it instead answers to the Department of Veterans Affairs, a Cabinet-level executive agency separate from the DoD. However, along with both providing security police services to properties primarily occupied by military and/or former military personnel, both DoD police and VA Police candidates with no prior LE experience may attend the same academy, typically the VA Law Enforcement Training Center's Basic Police Course. Additionally, LEOs of both the DoD and VA Police are federally-coded as "Police Series 0083," the 'career code' utilized by the federal government to identify most uniformed basic police officers in its employ.

Assignment to a particular installation will dictate the uniforms, insignia, and overall management of the personnel; DoD police assigned to an Air Force installation may be referred to as Department of the Air Force Police, and at an Army installation, Department of the Army Police, while the Navy utilize Department of the Navy Police personnel. The United States Marine Corps (USMC) may utilize DoN Police personnel, but on USMC-centric installations, United States Marine Corps Civilian Police personnel provide the primary law enforcement presence. All of these agencies fall under the DoD police umbrella; Such personnel are managed jointly by the DoD and the appropriate service department. The only exception to this is the USMC Civilian Police, whom are not officially under the auspices of the DoD police. The Civilian Police scheme is managed by the USMC Law Enforcement Program and is answerable directly to the USMC Commandant; however, USMC Civilian Police personnel are eligible for the same DoD POST Commission certification that DoD police agencies take part in.

DoD police personnel work alongside the various military police personnel of their respective branches; supplementing, complementing, and supporting such military personnel. DoD police personnel are not members of the military (and as such, are not subject to the Uniform Code of Military Justice), nor is prior military service a requirement for employment, although a higher percentage of personnel than most civilian law enforcement agencies within the U.S. are either veterans or military retirees.

DoD police personnel may have opportunities to be assigned to specialized units, receive specialized training, and otherwise perform duties beyond that of basic, uniformed security police tasks. Such specialities include police K-9 handlers, Special Reaponse Team (SRT or "SWAT") operators, conservation law enforcement officers (game wardens), traffic accident investigators, school resource officers (assigned to schools on military installations), harbor patrol, bicycle patrol, emergency management/incident command, and as detectives and criminal investigators. The latter are, alongside the appropriate military police investigators, responsible for misdemeanors and minor felonies; more serious and/or complex investigations are handled by the appropriate MCIO. However, DoD police detectives and investigators will work alongside MCIO special agents when-requested and, when on-base, have virtually the same authority as such special agents. However, DoD police detectives are not federally-credentialed special agents like their civilian special agent counterparts of the various MCIOs.

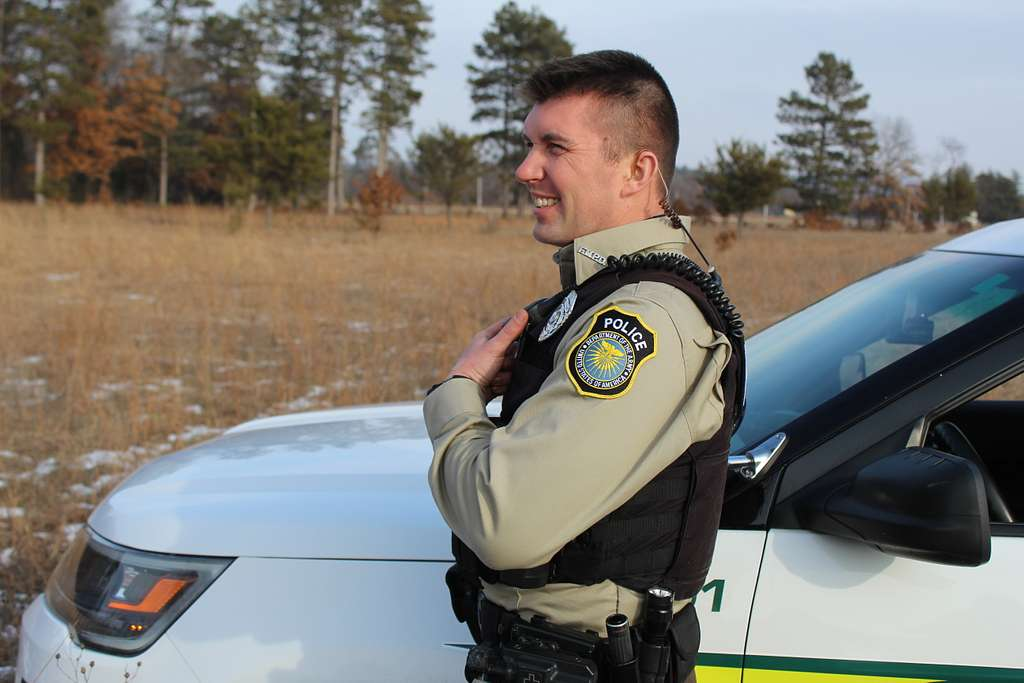
A Department of the Army "conservation law enforcement officer" (i.e. a game warden) on Fort McCoy, Wisconsin. Note the shoulder patch; Despite ultimately falling-under the Department of Defense police "umbrella", personnel assigned to specific installations wear accouterments of the appropriate military department (in this case "Department of the Army Police")

In addition to DoD and DoD component police agencies, several individual DoD agencies and installations maintain their own quasi-autonomous security police agencies which fall under the “DoD police” umbrella. Such agencies include:

- Defense Intelligence Agency Police
- Defense Logistics Agency Police
- National Geospatial-Intelligence Agency Police
- National Security Agency Police
- Office of Naval Intelligence Police
- Pentagon Force Protection Agency

All of these agencies are ultimately answerable to the same chain-of-command as "regular" DoD police personnel, although some agencies — particularly the Pentagon Force Protection Agency (PFPA) — may enjoy an additional level of autonomy. For instance, the PFPA has far more autonomy than other DoD police agencies in their selection and use of uniforms and equipment, in addition to having its own dedicated chain-of-command.

Unlike the civilian special agents of the various MCIOs, DoD police LEOs have little to no authority off of DoD property. Any authority they may exercise off-property is strictly controlled by “memorandums of understanding” with the relevant surrounding civilian law enforcement agencies.

As of the publication of DoD Instruction 5525.12 in 2014, qualified DoD LEOs and personnel of the various military police agencies fall under the Law Enforcement Officers Safety Act, permitting them to carry a concealed firearm off-duty across the United States, regardless of most state and local laws, with some exceptions. This act does not provide any statutory law enforcement authority over civilians to DoD police or military police personnel.

== Memorandums of understanding ==
Memorandums of understanding (MOUs) are established in agreement with either the city police chief, or the local sheriff vary with every DoD facility.

DoD police facilities that have MOU agreements include DoD police in San Francisco, California, the Los Angeles Air Force Base DoD police in southern California, NAWS China Lake in Ridgecrest, California, and the DoD police at the Norfolk Naval Station in Norfolk, Virginia.

Similar to the aforementioned Pentagon Police, the DoD police (specifically, Department of the Air Force Police) stationed on Hanscom Air Force Base in Eastern Massachusetts maintain a MOU with multiple historically significant towns (Bedford, Lincoln, Concord, and Lexington).

== DoD officers ==
=== Hiring ===
A DoD police officer is assigned the federal occupational series code (Civil Service Series) "0083", the code reserved for police.

This occupational series code applies regardless of what specific agency of the Department of Defense the officer works for.

Individual installations conduct the hiring process based upon local need, thus a person applying for a DoD police officer positions applies to specific installations.

Most installations have detectives, which can share the same "0083" occupational series code as police officers or "1811" series as criminal investigators. These detectives investigate misdemeanor or felony crimes; however, felony crimes are investigated on a case-by-case basis that are not pursued by the special agent of each branches' investigative agency (such as NCIS, CID, or OSI).

=== Duties ===
DoD police perform a variety of law enforcement and security roles.

One major function of a DoD police officer is to conduct law enforcement and force protection duties. This often takes the form of ensuring that only authorized personnel access the installation by performing identification checks at fixed entry control points (ECP). Officers at fixed posts ensure that all entry requirements have been met before allowing an individual to proceed.

DoD police officers also conduct patrols within the installation and other federal properties. An officer can conduct traffic stops for any motor vehicle violations.

Each jurisdiction adopts the surrounding state's motor vehicle laws under the Assimilative Crimes Act (see Federal Jurisdiction). There are two types of citations that may be issued: the DD Form 1408 Armed Forces Traffic Ticket and the CVB Form (U.S. District Court Violation Notice).

- The DD Form 1408 does not have any monetary fines associated with it and is an administrative type of punishment or can be used as a written warning.
- The CVB Form (USDCVN), however, carries a monetary fine or requires a mandatory appearance in U.S. District Court.

All monies collected from tickets written by agencies that partake in the CVB program are deposited in the Victims of Crime Fund established by US Congress under the Victims of Crime Act of 1984.

DoD police officers also respond to all calls for law enforcement assistance or service that take place within or surrounding the installations and federal property. If the crime is found to be a major felony, then the matter is generally referred to the special agents of the applicable investigative agency (NCIS, Army CID, OSI, FBI, etc.).

== Requirements of potential DoD officers ==
Actual recruitment requirements vary between service branches, agencies, and installations. There are, however, a few hiring requirements that are nearly universal among DoD police services.

A major requirement of any potential DoD officer is to pass a medical exam. While there is not typically an uncorrected vision requirement, candidates must have normal color vision, depth perception, and sufficiently good corrected vision.

For certain assignments DoD police officers are required to obtain and maintain a "Secret" security clearance. The background investigation must show the candidate to be free of substantial debt or foreign influence. Under the Lautenberg Amendment, DoD police officers cannot have any convictions for domestic violence. Law Enforcement Departments also require an interview with the candidate.

Candidates can be required to take and pass a physical fitness test. This test could take the form of the same type of test that is issued to military members (as in the case of Department of the Army officers) or the so-called Illinois Agility Test, a type of obstacle course (as in the case of some Department of the Navy officers). Some installations require officers pass this test annually, something not typically required of local municipal police officers (though these officers are often required to take one in their respective academies). There is a great deal of protocol variance between installations on the issue of the physical fitness test.

Whether or not a candidate has to attend a DoD academy (see "Training" section below) depends on both the installation and the prior law enforcement experience of the applying individual. A candidate transferring from another agency who has attended any state certified or federal (FLETC) academy is occasionally excused from attending a DoD academy.CINC 5530.14

== Training ==
DoD agencies, including Pentagon Police and Defense Logistics Agency Police, send their officers to the Federal Law Enforcement Training Center (FLETC) certified academies in Glynco, Georgia.

DoD police training outside of the Department of Defense itself may or may not be standardized and each military service (Coast Guard or US Air Force, US Marine Corps) may choose other academies and/or training regiments that satisfy their needs and requirements.

=== Army ===
The Army hosts its own Academy which is FLETA certified as the Department of the Army Civilian Police Academy at Fort Leonard Wood, and is used by DLA and other DOD Agencies at times. The Department of Veterans Affairs Law Enforcement Training Center (LETC) often serves as a training program that is able and willing to meet the training requirements for DoD Officers and their respective installations.

=== Air Force ===
Officers of the Department of the Air Force Police attend a 10-week training academy (formerly 6 weeks) at the Department of Veterans Affairs Law Enforcement Training Center (LETC) in Little Rock, Arkansas as well. This is an Air Force-specific course that does not certify officers to work on Veteran's Administration properties, only Air Force installations.

There are also various specialized government and private entities that supply specialized training to DoD Officers on an as needed basis. Some DoD police officers have concurrent jurisdiction, meaning they can enforce state laws off base and the city police can enforce state laws on the base.

=== Navy ===
The Department of the Navy civilian officers attend a 13 week academy at one of the two Federal Law Enforcement Training Centers in Glynco, Georgia or Artesia, New Mexico where they attend the Uniformed Police Training Course and receive Federal Certification from FLETC as a Federal Law Enforcement Officer. This is a Federally Accredited Certification that is recognized by most Federal Law Enforcement Agencies. They then return to their field office and train for several weeks with a Field Training Officer before patrolling on their own. They can also attend other FLETC courses such as Drug Recognition or Human Trafficking Courses. Navy Civilian Police also have concurrent jurisdiction with their city counterparts in Southeastern Virginia.

=== Marine Corps ===
The Marine Corps initiated a Civilian Police force in 2005. In 2008 the Marine Corps decided to expand the civilian police officers to all other Marine Corps installations in the United States. All police officers up to the rank of Deputy Chief of Police undergo 12 weeks of FLETA training at Fort Leonard Wood.

== DoD Security ==
DOD Security Officers (GS-0085) (often known as "Guards" (e.g. Department of Army Guard or "DASG") are not federal police officers, but do hold federal grades, wear similar uniforms and carry firearms. Their duties are mostly access control.

=== Training ===
Guards are often trained at their location, rather than a central training facility like the GS-0083 police officers.

== Equipment ==
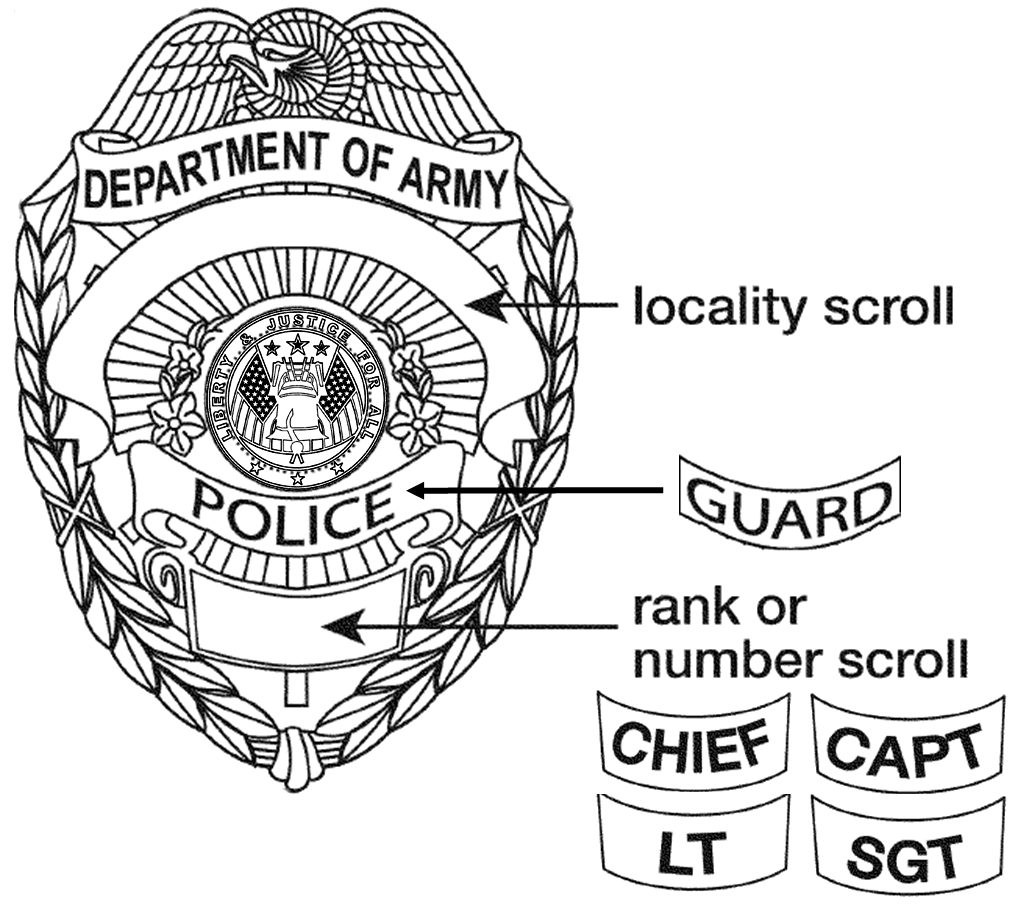
US Department of the Army Civilian Police / Guard Badge

DoD police officers wear typical police style uniforms, more often than not in a shade of dark "L.A.P.D." blue. Pentagon Police wear a grey police uniform. Many installations now issue solid blue or black BDUs/TDUs for officers with cloth badges and name tapes. Badges and patches vary widely between agencies and installations.

DoD officers carry a firearm, typically a M18 Sig Sauer, spare ammunition, pepper spray, a police baton (typically an expandable ASP), a taser, handcuffs, radio, latex gloves, and other commonly seen police equipment. Bulletproof vests are also issued. During higher threat conditions, officers could be equipped with Kevlar helmets and other protective equipment; along with rifles, carbines, and shotguns.

DoD police vehicles vary widely, with vehicles including Chevrolet Silverados, Chevrolet Tahoes, Ford Explorers, and Dodge Chargers. However, most installations and agencies use the Chevrolet Impala or Ford Police Interceptor. Vehicles may be marked or unmarked and utilize emergency blue and red lights and sirens. Some vehicles are equipped with cages for prisoner transport, but not all.

== See also ==
- List of United States federal law enforcement agencies
- United States Department of Defense
- United States Pentagon Police
- Department of the Army Civilian Police
- Department of the Air Force Police
- Department of the Navy Police
- United States Marine Corps Civilian Police
- Ministry of Defence Police – perform a similar role in the United Kingdom.
