= United States Marine Corps Criminal Investigation Division =

Federal law enforcement agency

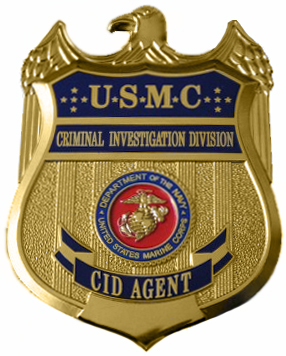
- Badge design of the United States Marine Corps Criminal Investigation Division
- Abbreviation: USMC CID

Agency overview
- Employees: Approx. 180

Jurisdictional structure
- Federal agency: United States
- Operations jurisdiction: United States
- General nature: Federal law enforcement

Operational structure
- Agents: 150 (approx.)
- Parent agency: United States Marine Corps Law Enforcement Branch

The United States Marine Corps Criminal Investigation Division (Marine Corps CID or USMC CID) is a federal law enforcement agency that investigates crimes against people and property within the United States Marine Corps.

== Overview ==
The United States Marine Corps Criminal Investigation Division is a Department of the Navy law enforcement organization assigned within the Provost Marshal's Office and works directly for the provost marshal. As an organic law enforcement agency, Marine Corps CID executes its mission, including criminal investigations, criminal operations, and other law enforcement related activities, in coordination with the Naval Criminal Investigative Service (NCIS). NCIS has primary responsibility for investigating all actual, suspected, and alleged crimes involving special victims (such as sex crimes and crimes against children) within the Department of the Navy and primary jurisdiction to conduct criminal operations. Marine Corps CID is the Marine Corps’ criminal investigatory entity for misdemeanor and felony offenses, in which NCIS has not assumed investigative jurisdiction, within both Fleet Marine Force operations and the Supporting Establishment. These activities include criminal investigations related to violations of the Uniform Code of Military Justice by United States military personnel; violations of US Code by civilians aboard Marine Corps installations; force protection efforts by the collection of criminal intelligence; investigative lead tasking; and activities in coordination with other local, state, federal, and host nation law enforcement agencies.

The United States Marine Corps Criminal Investigation Division conducts misdemeanor and felony level criminal investigations in which NCIS has not assumed investigative jurisdiction; provides crime analysis and criminal intelligence support to law enforcement and commanders; conducts forensic analysis to identify offenders; and collects, analyzes, and maintains evidence to assist administrative/adjudicative decision making. Marine Corps CID ensures unit readiness and quality of life by identifying offenders and preventing criminal activity. The United States Marine Corps Criminal Investigation Division provides the Marine Corps with organic criminal investigative, criminal intelligence, and forensic capabilities applicable to both the Supporting Establishment and Fleet Marine Force environments. These capabilities support Marine Corps force protection and operational objectives by promoting good order and discipline; supporting combat operations; identifying, preventing, and mitigating criminal/terrorist threats; and assisting with the adjudicative proceedings of individuals that have, or would do, harm to the Marine Corps or its warfighting mission.

== History ==
The United States Marine Corps Criminal Investigation Division was created in 1945. In the late 1960s, the Marine Corps formalized CID by creating a military occupational specialty for its investigators. Prior 1976, Marine Corps Criminal Investigation Division had jurisdiction of all criminal investigations, felonies and misdemeanors in the Marine Corps. In June 1976, the Marine Corps and Naval Investigative Service (later reorganized into the Naval Criminal Investigative Service) signed their first memorandum of understanding which limited Marine Corps CID's investigative purview to minor offenses and those offenses Naval Investigative Service chose not to investigate. This memorandum also established the routine assignment of 30 Marine Corps CID investigators to Naval Investigative Service to perform duties as special agents. Although the parties made some jurisdictional modifications when they renegotiated the memorandum of understanding in May 1987, Naval Investigative Service maintained jurisdictional control over serious criminal offenses. The new memorandum of understanding between NCIS and the commandant of the Marine Corps was signed on 1 August 2003.

== Selection and training ==
CID Agent candidates must be currently serving as an enlisted active duty Marine between the grades of senior E-4 through junior E-5. E-5’s must not have more than (2) years time in grade. Civilian CID Agents must be employed in the government schedule (GS) 1811 series as a criminal investigator. All CID Agents must be able to obtain and maintain a Top Secret security clearance. Marine candidates must possess a GT score of 110 or higher, have normal color vision. Both Marine and civilian agents must meet Marine Corps physical fitness standards. Prospective Marine Corps CID agents are sent to the U.S. Army Military Police Schools (USAMPS) to attend the U.S. Army CID Special Agent Course (CIDSAC) at Fort Leonard Wood, Missouri, and must complete six months on-the-job training. Civilian CID agents either attend CIDSAC, or the Criminal Investigative Training Program (CITP) at the U.S. Department of Homeland Security’s Federal Law Enforcement Training Center (FLETC) at Glynco, GA. Marine Corps CID agents may later return to USAMPS or FLETC to attend advanced or specialized training as may be directed.

== Responsibility ==
CID is responsible for:

- Complex misdemeanor and felony investigations.
- Investigation of narcotics cases.
- Liaison with federal, state, and local law enforcement agencies.
- Assist the U.S. Attorney's Office, local District Attorney's Office, and the Staff Judge Advocate Office for prosecution of criminal cases.
- Maintaining the Provost Marshals Office / Marine Corps Police Dept. evidence repository.
- Maintain a Criminal Intelligence component.
- Conduct internal personnel inquiries (Internal Affairs)
- Protective Service Details / Executive Protection.
- Crisis Negotiators (CNT)
- Liaison with Family Assistance Program concerning the law enforcement aspects of domestic violence issues.

USMC CID investigates misdemeanors and felonies of the Uniform Code of Military Justice and United States Code.

== Uniform ==
Special Agents typically dress in professional business attire. Due to the nature of their work, undercover assignments and field work will typically dictate their attire.

== Firearms ==
As of 2022, Marine Corps CID Agents are issued either the SIG Sauer M18 service pistol, or the Glock 19M, depending on the installation where they serve. Previously CID Agents carried the Beretta M9 9mm pistol and the SIG Sauer M11 (P228).

== See also ==
- United States Marine Corps Civilian Police
- List of United States federal law enforcement agencies

JAG Corps

- Judge Advocate General's Corps, U.S. Navy
- U.S. Marine Corps Judge Advocate Division

Intelligence

- Office of Naval Intelligence (ONI)
- Marine Corps Intelligence Activity

Other

- Defense Counterintelligence and Security Agency (DCSA), Department of Defense
