= United States Marine Corps Civilian Police =

Law enforcement agency in the United States

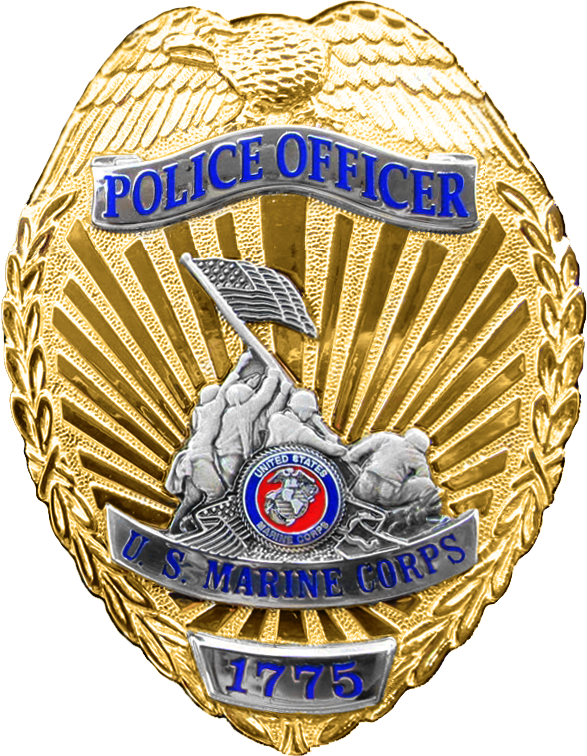
- Badge of the USMC Police

Jurisdictional structure
- Federal agency: United States
- Operations jurisdiction: United States
- General nature: Federal law enforcement

Operational structure
- Parent agency: United States Marine Corps

The United States Marine Corps Civilian Police is the civilian law enforcement agency of the United States Marine Corps. Officially called the "Marine Corps Law Enforcement Program" (MCLEP), the agency is composed of civilian (non-military) federal police officers.

== History ==
The Marine Corps initiated a Civilian Police force in 2005 (0083) and established Marine Corps Police Departments in MCLB Barstow, California, MCLB Albany, Georgia; and MCSF Blount Island, Jacksonville, Florida. In 2008 the Marine Corps decided to expand the civilian police officers to all other Marine Corps installations in the United States.

== Duties ==
The duties of the United States Marine Corps Civilian Police are following:

- Force protection
- Physical security
- Access control
- Traffic control
- Respond to emergency calls

Officers of civilian police provide their functions to Marine Corps establishments alongside Marine Corps military police officers.

== Training ==
The USMC trains its civilian MCLEP officers through its Marine Corps Police Academy Basic Police Officers Course (BPOC) which provides them with the tools to do the job, alongside their military police counterparts. This includes law enforcement training, force protection, first-aid, self defence and firearms. All police officers up to the rank of Deputy Chief of Police undergo 12 weeks of FLETA accredited training at Fort Leonard Wood in Missouri.

== Uniform and equipment ==
=== Uniform ===
Civilian MCLEP officers wear a dark blue uniform, similar to other DoD Police, but with "Marine Corps Police" shoulder patches and a USMC Police badge (shield).

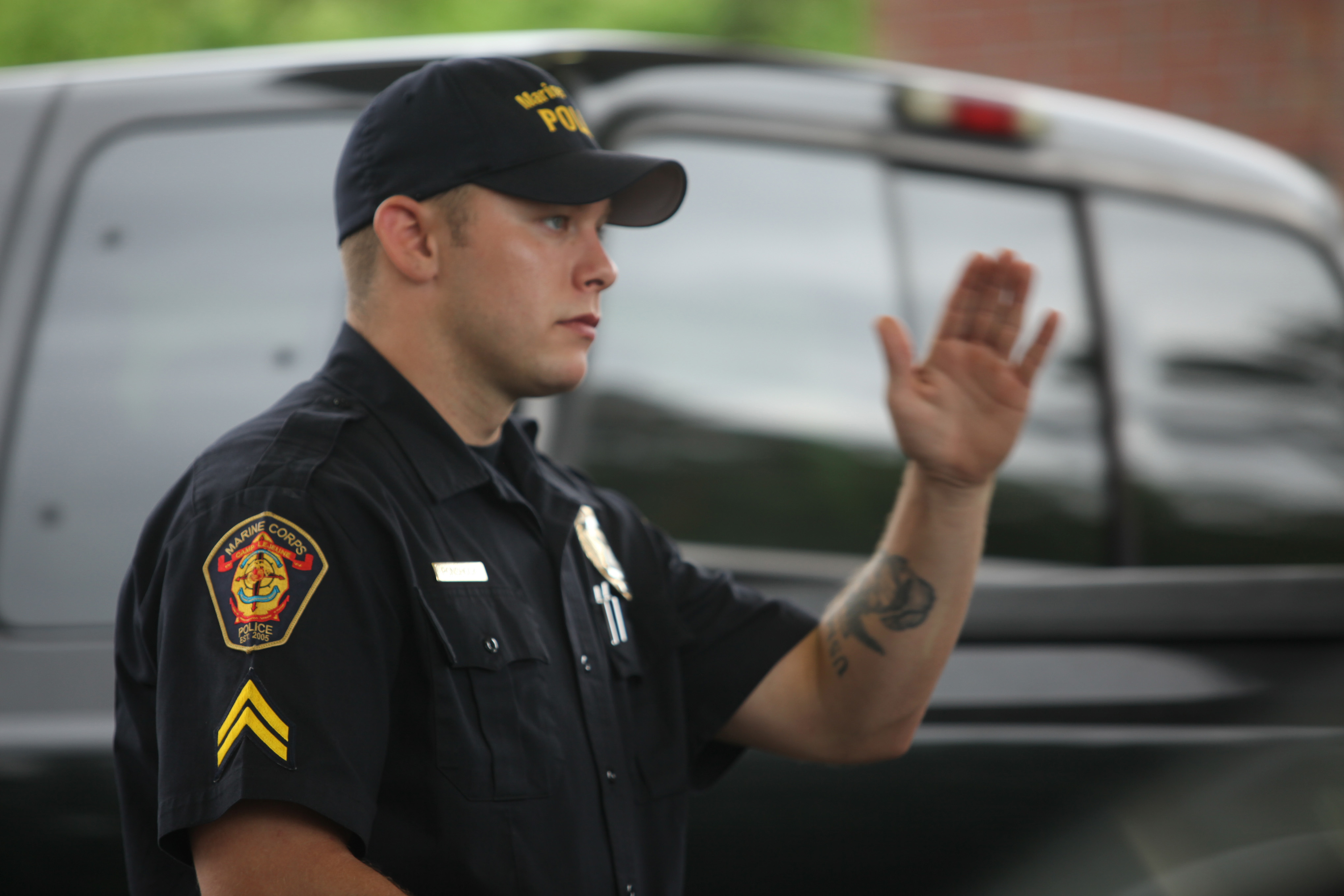
Uniform

=== Equipment ===
The equipment for police officers consists of a M18 duty sidearm (pistol), expandable baton, OC spray, two-way radio, Taser, handcuffs, torch and gloves. Other weapons include the M1014 Joint Services Combat Shotgun. Officers who train and qualify for it may also be issued an M4 carbine or an M16A4 rifle depending on installation resources. In addition, plate carriers, ballistic plates and duty belts are typically issued at the Marine Corps Police Academy upon completion of the course Equipment will be worn around the waist on a duty belt, with shield on left breast.

=== Vehicles ===
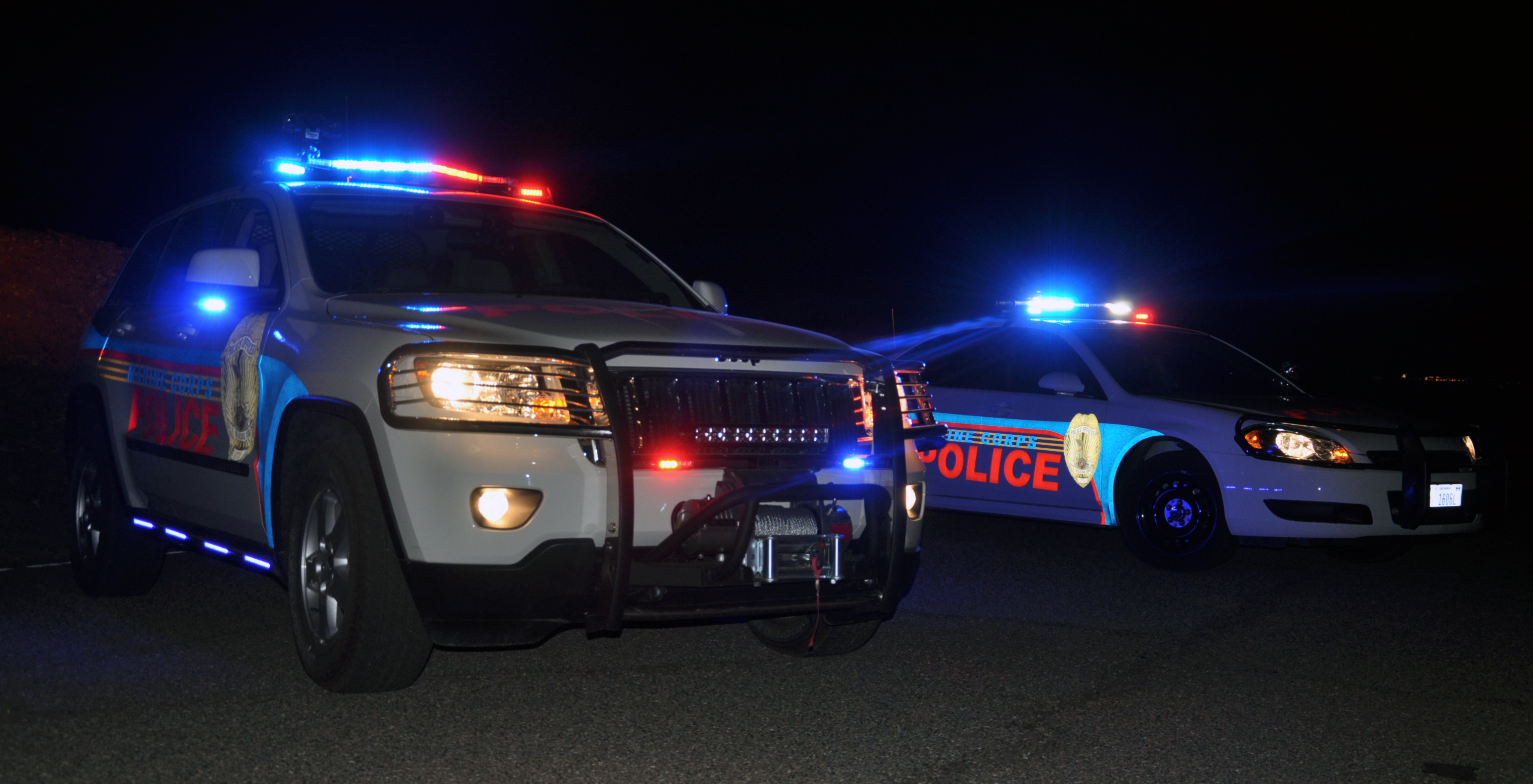
USMC Police Vehicles at MCLB Barstow. The vehicles assist police officers with duties such as patrolling areas, responding to incidents and transporting criminal suspects.

For base law enforcement, marked police vehicles are used. These are similar to other DoD Police and civilian police vehicles. They are generally equipped with red/blue lights, siren & PA system, computers and radios.

== See also ==
- Department of Defense police
- Department of the Navy Police
- Department of the Army Civilian Police
- Department of the Air Force Police
