= Cecil Facer Secondary School =

Coordinates: 46.46172°N 80.9540°W

- Greater Sudbury, Ontario; Canada

Cecil Facer Secondary School is a school located in the South End of Greater Sudbury, Ontario, beyond the residential/commercial sector. It is a school for students with difficulties with the law and also acts as a detention centre.
