= Advanced Facer-Canceler System =

Mail sorting machine used by the US Postal Service

Advanced Facer Canceller System
- Industry: Postal service

The Advanced Facer Canceller System (AFCS) is an electro-mechanical mail handling system. A high-speed machine used by the US Postal Service to cull, face, and cancel letter mail through a series of automated operations. AFCS was first implemented in 1992, and is capable of processing 30,000 pieces of mail per hour.
