= Department of the Air Force Police =

Civilian-staffed U.S. Air Force law enforcement program

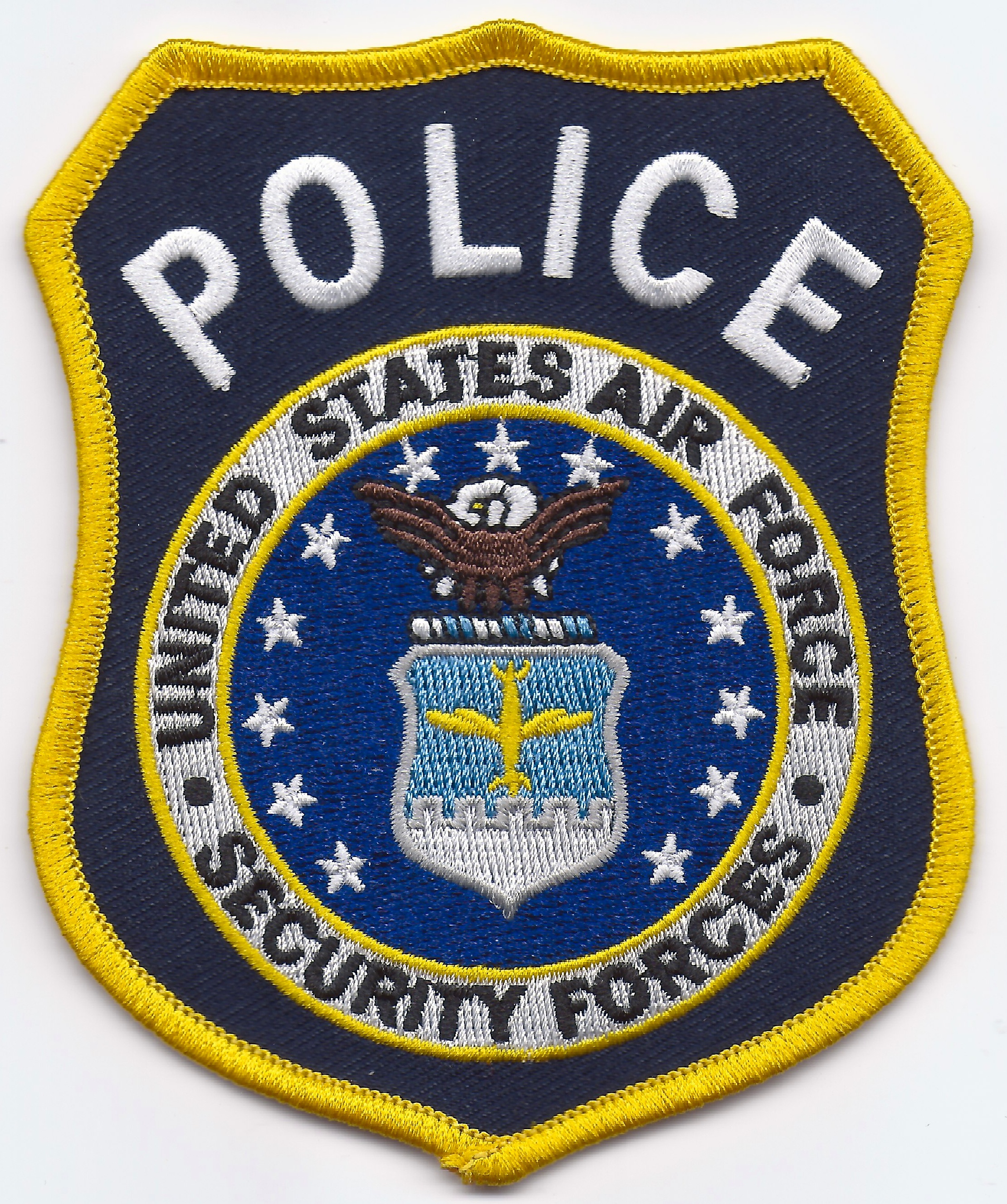
- Patch of the Department of Air Force Police

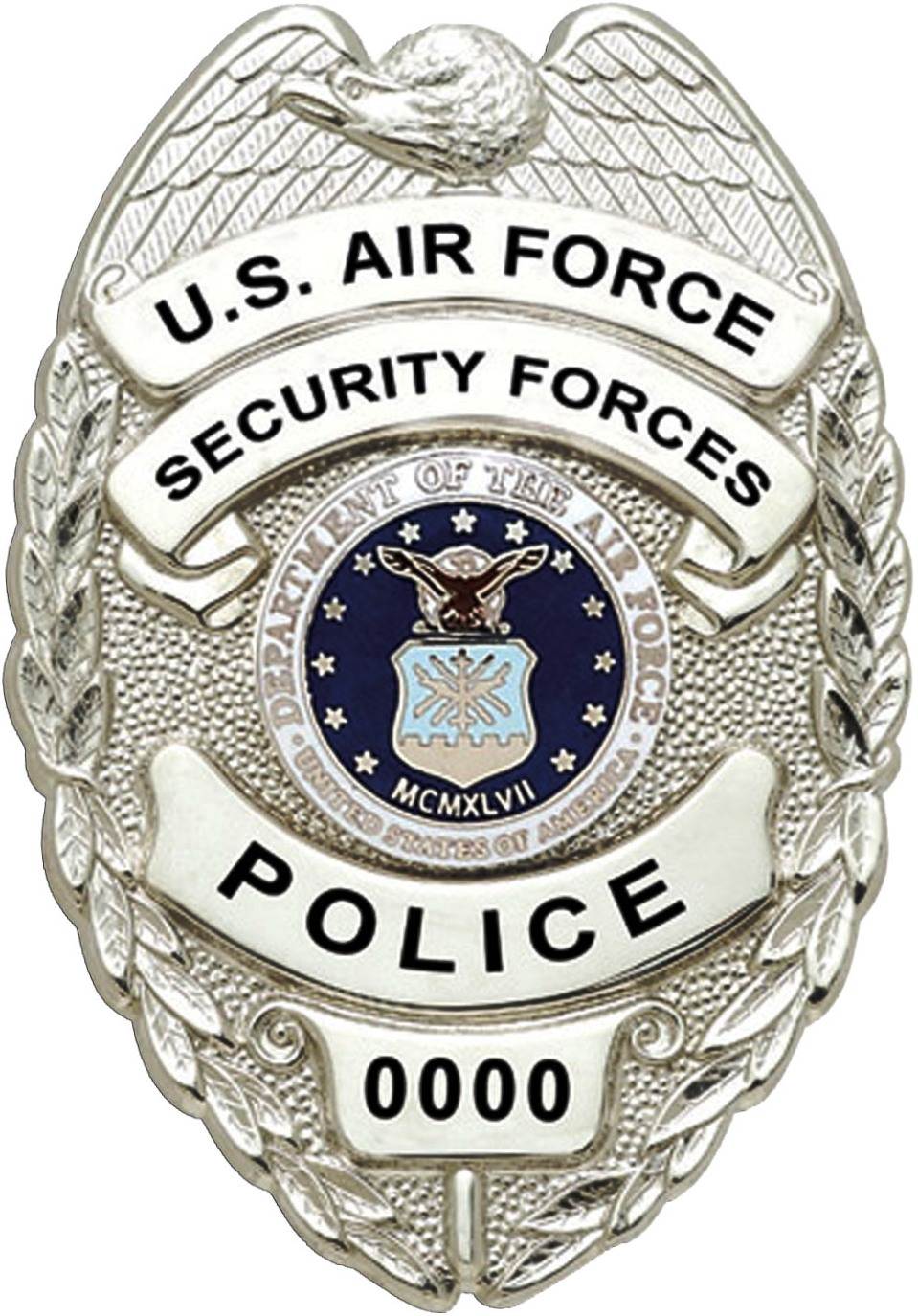
- Badge of the Department of the Air Force Police
- Abbreviation: DAF Police

Agency overview
- Formed: 2009 (approx.)

Jurisdictional structure
- Federal agency: United States
- Operations jurisdiction: United States
- General nature: Federal law enforcement; Military provost

Operational structure
- Parent agency: Department of the Air Force

Website
- Official website

The United States Department of the Air Force Police (DAF Police) is the uniformed security police program of the Department of the Air Force (DAF). As part of the Air Force Civilian Service (AFCS), it provides professional, civilian, federal police officers to serve and protect U.S. Air Force (USAF) and Space Force (USSF) personnel, properties, and installations. DAF Police personnel represent the DAF's contribution to the Department of Defense Police program. DAF Police officers primarily work alongside USAF Security Forces, the military police of the USAF and USSF. Although a separate branch from the USAF, the USSF still falls-under the DAF, therefore law enforcement services are provided to the USSF by the DAF Police and USAF Security Forces (the USSF, as of 2026, does not have an organic military police profession). Although the Air Force Office of Special Investigations employs civilian special agents, it does not fall-under either the DAF Police or DoD Police umbrella.

== Duties ==
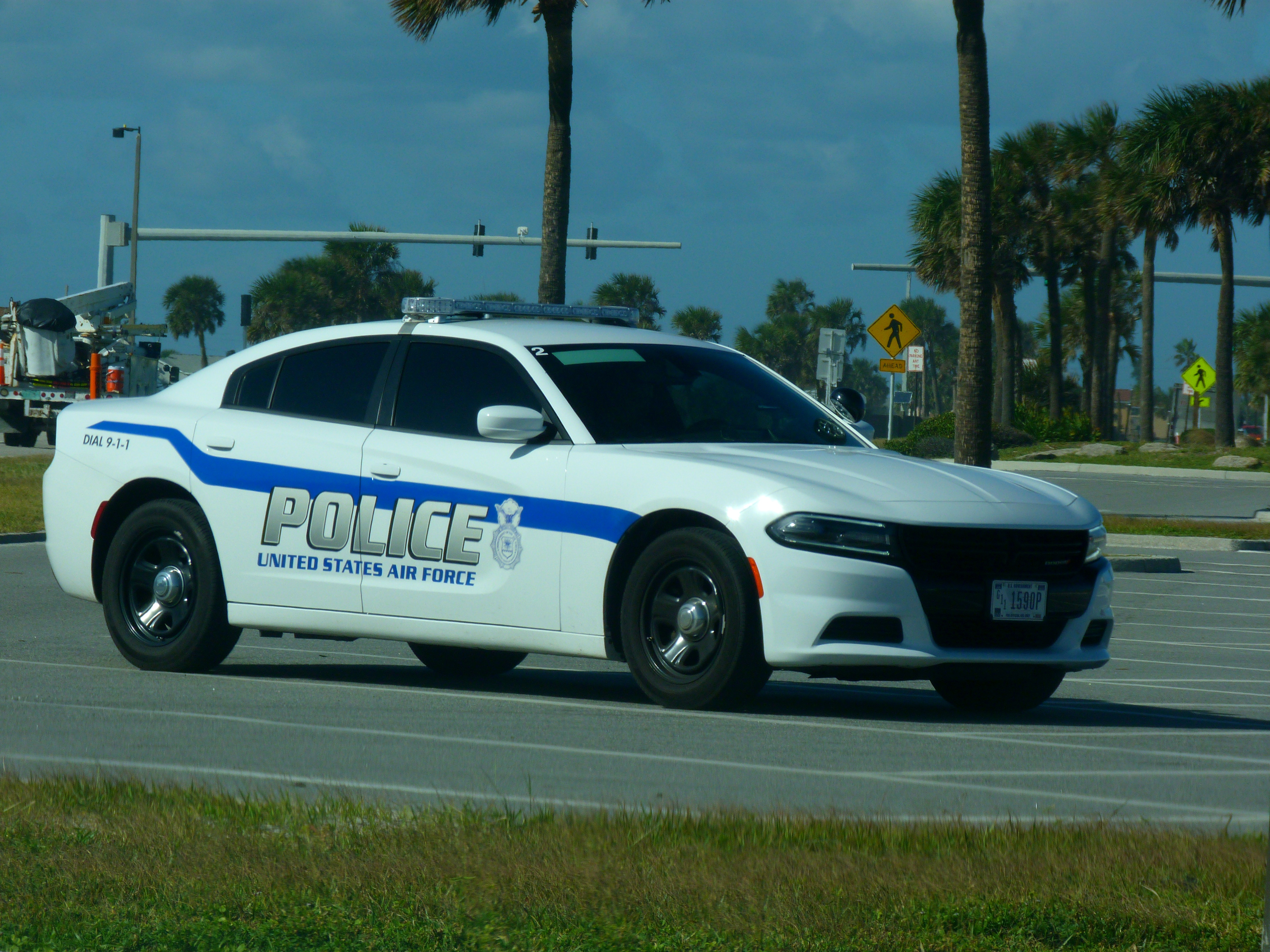
DAF Police/Security Forces Dodge Charger

DAF Police officers perform law enforcement and crime prevention duties to maintain law and order during normal and emergency operations.

DAF Police performs police duties to assure the protection of life, property, and the civil rights of individuals through the enforcement of federal, state, and local laws, ordinances, agency rules, and regulations.

DAF Civilian Police officers:

- testify in court,
- take measurements and photographs of crime and accident scenes,
- acts as First responders to all types of emergencies or volatile situations such as terrorist attacks, hostage/barricaded situations, bomb threats, vehicle accidents, robberies, hazardous material incidents, and other emergencies,
- provide specialized traffic control services,
- secures and processes crime scenes,

conducts preliminary investigations, gathers evidence, obtain witness statements and, if necessary, detain suspects.

DAF Police can issue the DD Form 1408 Armed Forces Traffic Ticket, and the U.S. District Court Violation Notice. The DD Form 1408 does not have any monetary fines associated with it, and is typically used as a warning or other type of punishment. The U.S. District Court Violation Notice can carry a monetary fine or require a mandatory appearance in U.S. District Court. Points are also assessed on all 50 states driver licenses.

The DAF Police occasionally provides executive protection services for visiting dignitaries.

DAF Police work closely with USAF Security Forces and often patrol and respond to calls together.

== Job description ==
DAF Police are designated under the GS-0083 series.

"Police Officer" or "Detective" is the established title for non-supervisory positions in the Police Series, GS-0083. (The detective title is for positions primarily concerned with police investigations involving violations of criminal or other laws.)

This series includes positions the primary duties of which are:

- the performance or supervision of law enforcement work in the preservation of the peace;
- the prevention, detection, and investigation of crimes;
- the arrest or apprehension of violators;
- and the provision of assistance to citizens in emergency situations, including the protection of civil rights.

The purpose of police work is to assure compliance with federal, state, county, and municipal laws and ordinances, and agency rules and regulations pertaining to law enforcement work.

== Training ==
Cadets of the Department of the Air Force Police attend a 10-week POST (Peace Officer Standards and Training) accredited training academy (formerly 6 weeks) at the Department of Veterans Affairs Law Enforcement Training Center (LETC) in Little Rock, Arkansas. This is a Department of the Air Force-specific course that does not certify officers to work on Veteran's Administration properties, only Air Force and Space Force installations.

They train to proficiency with 9mm semi-automatic pistol (M18 Sig Sauer), and other firearms such as the M-4/M-16, shotgun, and other special weapons or ordnance, as well as become experienced in computerized investigations systems.

DAF Police officers are held to the same standards as their active duty USAF SF counterparts, with regards to dress, appearance and training.

== Uniform and Equipment ==
=== Uniform ===
DAF Police wear a dark blue style uniform, similar to DLA Police, Department of the Army Civilian Police, etc., in both BDU & Class A formats. Some officers, on certain duties, may wear an overt equipment vest with "POLICE" markings and DAF Police badge.

There is a specific DAF Police shoulder patch, badge and rank insignia is aligned (as close as possible) to USAF ranks, at least at the officer level (e.g. DAF Police Lieutenant wears one silver bar, similar to USAF Lieutenant).

=== Firearms ===
DAF Police Officers are armed with a Sig P320, designated as M18 service pistol, as well as a Taser, Baton, handcuffs, radio, flashlight and notebook & pen.

These firearms are loaded, and stun guns (X26P) are checked and tested, under supervision, before each shift.

=== Vehicles ===
DAF Police use the same vehicles as their active duty counterparts in SF, such as the Chevrolet Impala and Ford Police Interceptor, normally white in colour, with the Security Forces badge on both front doors, two blue stripes down the sides and "POLICE" on both front wings.

However, there are some variations with regards to liveries, some vehicles may have the name of the Air Force Base (AFB), or have "SECURITY FORCES" written on the vehicle. Some vehicles have red-blue or blue-blue flashing lights.

== Rank Structure ==
DAF Police rank structure is similar to other police, federal police and DoD law-enforcement agencies. Where possible, the insignia and rank is "comparable with the rank insignia of their military counterparts".

Department of the Air Force Police

Grade	GS-12	GS-12	GS-12, GS-11	GS-11, GS-10, GS-9	GS-8	GS-7	GS-6	GS-5
Rank	Director	Deputy Director	Deputy Chief, Assistant Operations Officer	Superintendent, Shift Leader, Section Leader	Sergeant	Corporal	Officer	Officer
Insignia							No insignia	No insignia

== Civilian Guards ==
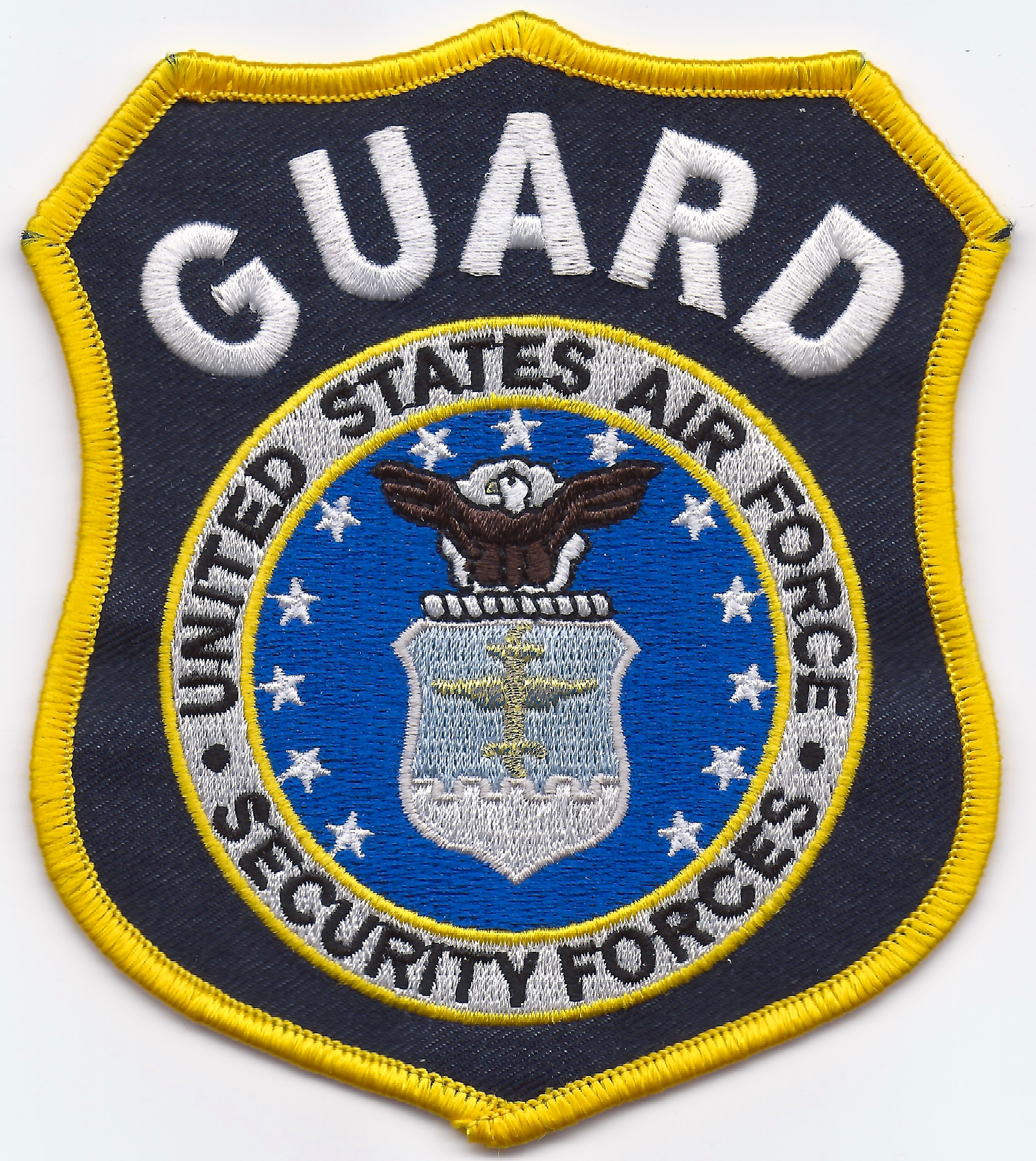
United States Air Force Security Forces GUARD Patch

The Department of Air Force also employs civilian security officers known as a DAF Guard (Security Guard Series, GS-0085) to protect DAF property and persons, along with DAF Police and USAF Security Forces (military police).

DAF Guard members are armed and wear a uniform similar to DAF Civilian Police, but with a patch and badge reading "GUARD" instead of "POLICE".

These duties were formerly carried out by private contract guards.

== See also ==
- Air Force Personnel Center
- Department of Defense police
- Federal law enforcement in the United States
- Law enforcement in the United States
- List of law enforcement agencies
- United States Air Force Security Forces
