= Ford police vehicles =

Police vehicles manufactured by the Ford Motor Company

Ford Police Interceptor
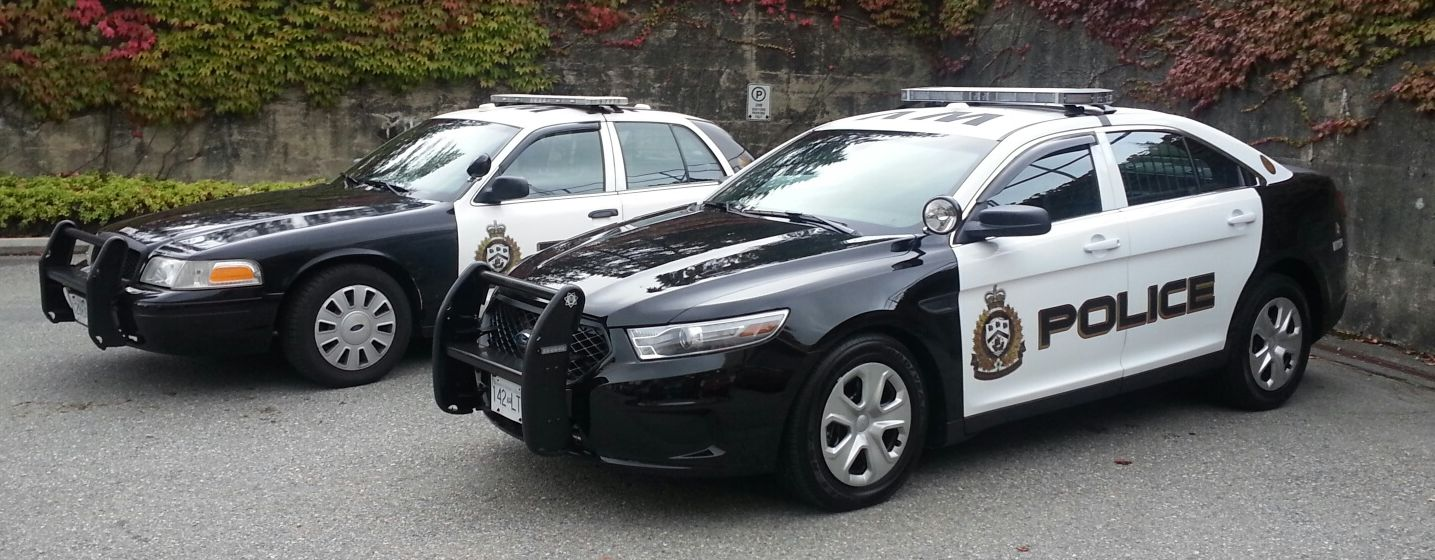
- Ford Crown Victoria and Ford Taurus-based Ford Police Interceptors used by the West Vancouver Police Department

Overview
- Manufacturer: Ford Motor Company
- Production: 1992–present

Body and chassis
- Class: Sedan (1992–2020); SUV (2012–present); Police car
- Body style: 4-door sedan (1992–2020); 4-door SUV (2012–present)
- Layout: FR layout, FF layout, 4WD layout

Ford police vehicles constitute the automobiles manufactured and sold by the Ford Motor Company for use as police cars and other car-based emergency vehicles. Though Ford has been producing police-oriented fleet vehicle variants of their full-size Ford sedans since the 1950s, the primary nameplate used by Ford for police vehicles since 1992 has been the Ford Police Interceptor, consisting of existing Ford models modified and sold for frontline police and law enforcement agency use. A similar nameplate, the Ford Police Responder, was introduced in the mid-2010s, consisting of special-duty police vehicles not intended to be used in frontline roles.

Ford police vehicles are sold to, and are popular among, law enforcement in the United States, Canada, and Mexico, though they have also seen limited success outside North America. The Ford Police Interceptor and Ford Police Responder are intended to compete with the Chevrolet 9C1 and the Dodge Charger Pursuit and Durango Pursuit.

As of 2025, the only Ford Police Interceptor in production is the Ford Police Interceptor Utility, a variant of the Ford Explorer. The Ford Police Responder line consists of variants of the Ford F-150, Ford Expedition, and Ford Transit. Sedans have not been part of the Ford police vehicle lineup since 2020, but historically included the Ford Crown Victoria Police Interceptor, Ford Police Interceptor Sedan, and Ford Fusion Hybrid. Police variants of Ford's electric vehicles have reportedly been considered, including variants of the Ford Mustang Mach-E and Ford F-150 Lightning.

== Background ==
Ford vehicles have been popular with police since the company's infancy, and Ford often sold directly to police departments; however, these did not use the "Police Interceptor" name. In 1951, Ford named the optional flathead V-8 for the 1949 Ford the "Interceptor"; this engine was available in the model's Police Package. The practice of naming Ford's Police Package motors "Interceptor" continued through the 1950s. The Ford LTD Crown Victoria, produced from 1979 to 1991, used the "P72" production code designation for fleet models. However, none used the name "Police Interceptor".

== Ford Police Interceptor ==
=== Crown Victoria Police Interceptor ===
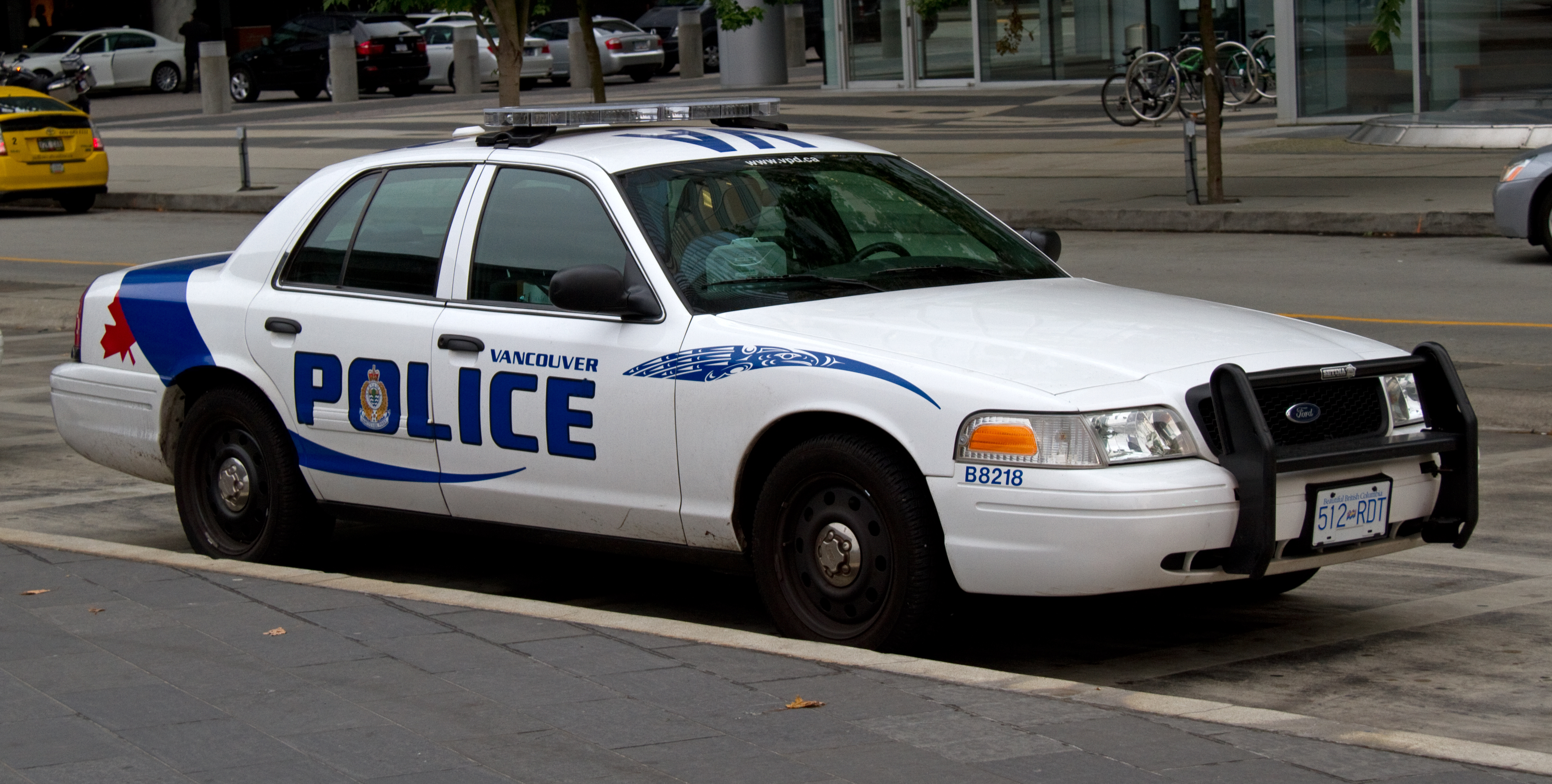
A second-generation CVPI used by the Vancouver Police Department

The Ford Crown Victoria Police Interceptor (CVPI) was the first Ford vehicle to use the "Police Interceptor" name, and was introduced in 1992, based on the first generation Ford Crown Victoria. It featured a 4.6-liter Modular V8 engine and either a Ford AOD/AOD-E or Ford 4R70W 4-speed automatic transmission.

For almost the entirety of its first generation production run from 1992 to 1997, the CVPI closely resembled the civilian market Crown Victoria, including its 1995 facelift. In 1998, the CVPI received a second generation redesign alongside the civilian Crown Victoria. Though the second generation CVPI initially continued to closely resemble its civilian market version, significant model redesigns in the early 2000s, including the removal of chrome trim and the replacement of its civilian slatted grille in favor of a unique honeycomb grille, gave the CVPI an increasingly distinct appearance. To continue to provide a civilian appearance for unmarked police cars, the "Street Appearance Package" was introduced as an option, designed to closely resemble the civilian Crown Victoria. When the Ford Crown Victoria was discontinued in the civilian market in 2008, the CVPI remained in production.

2011 was the final model year for the CVPI. The last CVPI was sold to the Kansas Highway Patrol, which they outfitted as a retro style parade car. To replace the CVPI, Ford introduced police variants of the sixth generation Taurus and fifth generation Ford Explorer in 2012 for the 2013 model year. The names for both cars were the Ford Police Interceptor Sedan and Ford Police Interceptor Utility, respectively.

=== Police Interceptor Sedan ===
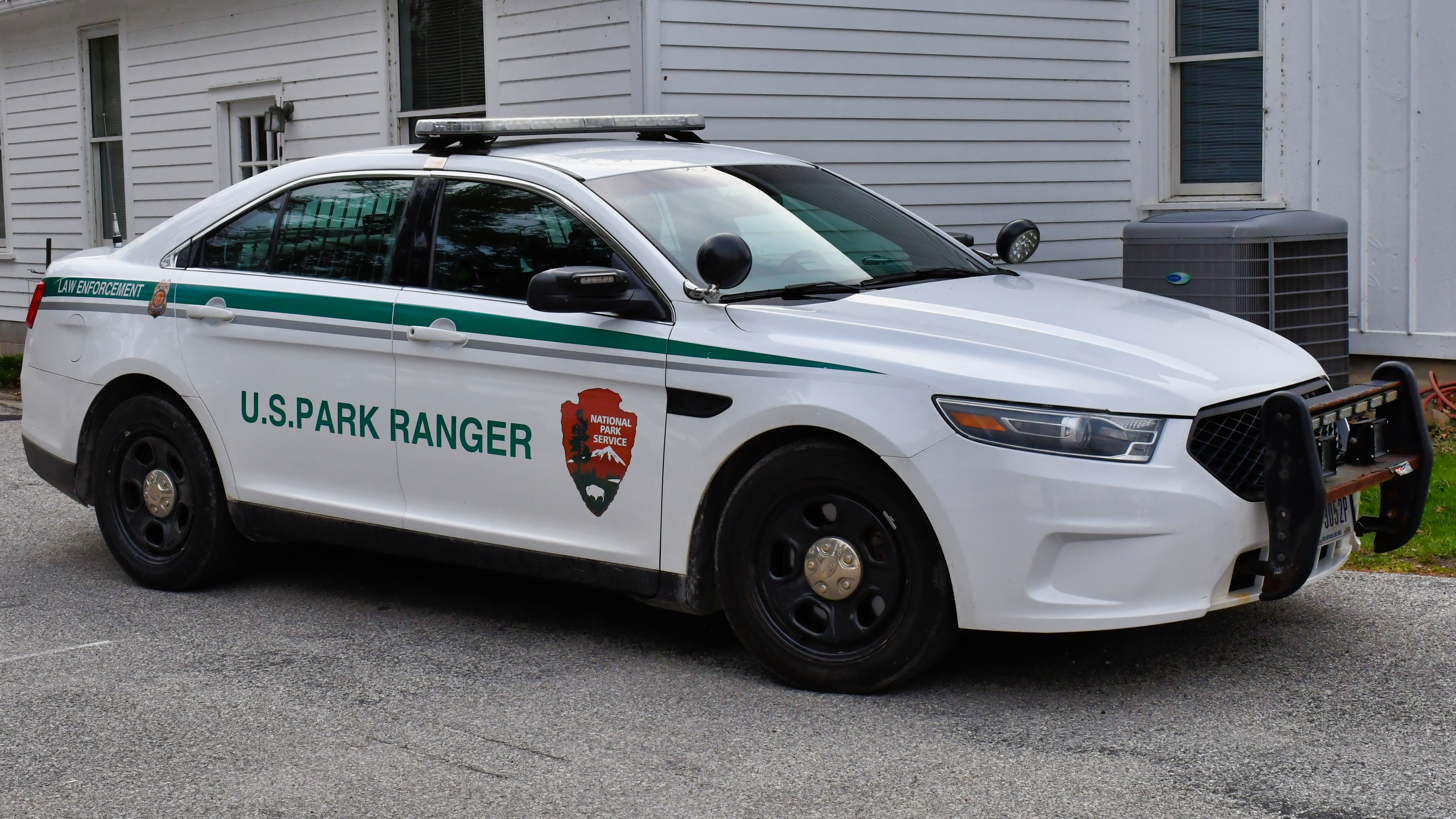
An FPIS used by the National Park Service Law Enforcement Rangers

The Ford Police Interceptor Sedan (FPIS) was introduced as the sedan of the Ford Police Interceptor range for the 2013 model year, based on the sixth generation Ford Taurus.

The FPIS's standard engine was a naturally-aspirated 3.5-liter V6 engine, shared with the regular Taurus. A 3.7-liter aluminum-block V6 engine, shared with the Ford Mustang, became available shortly after as an upgrade. Ford also offered an EcoBoost version, the SHO's 3.5-liter V6, which produces 365 hp (272 kW; 370 PS). All versions came with all-wheel drive, though front-wheel drive was available for the naturally-aspirated 3.5-liter version. In 2014, Ford began offering the 4-cylinder engine from its civilian counterpart in the FPIS as part of a Special Service trim designed for detective and administrative uses. The FPIS was available with newer Ford safety technology such as the Blind Spot Information System, rear view camera, reverse sensing system, and electronic stability control.

In 2015, Ford considered ending production of the Taurus in the United States; however, the FPIS was a major reason for continuing production. In 2018, Ford announced that it would be ending production of the Taurus, on which the FPIS was based. In March 2019, both the Taurus and FPIS were discontinued. The FPIS was replaced by the Ford Police Interceptor Utility and the Ford Police Responder Hybrid Sedan.

=== Police Interceptor Utility ===
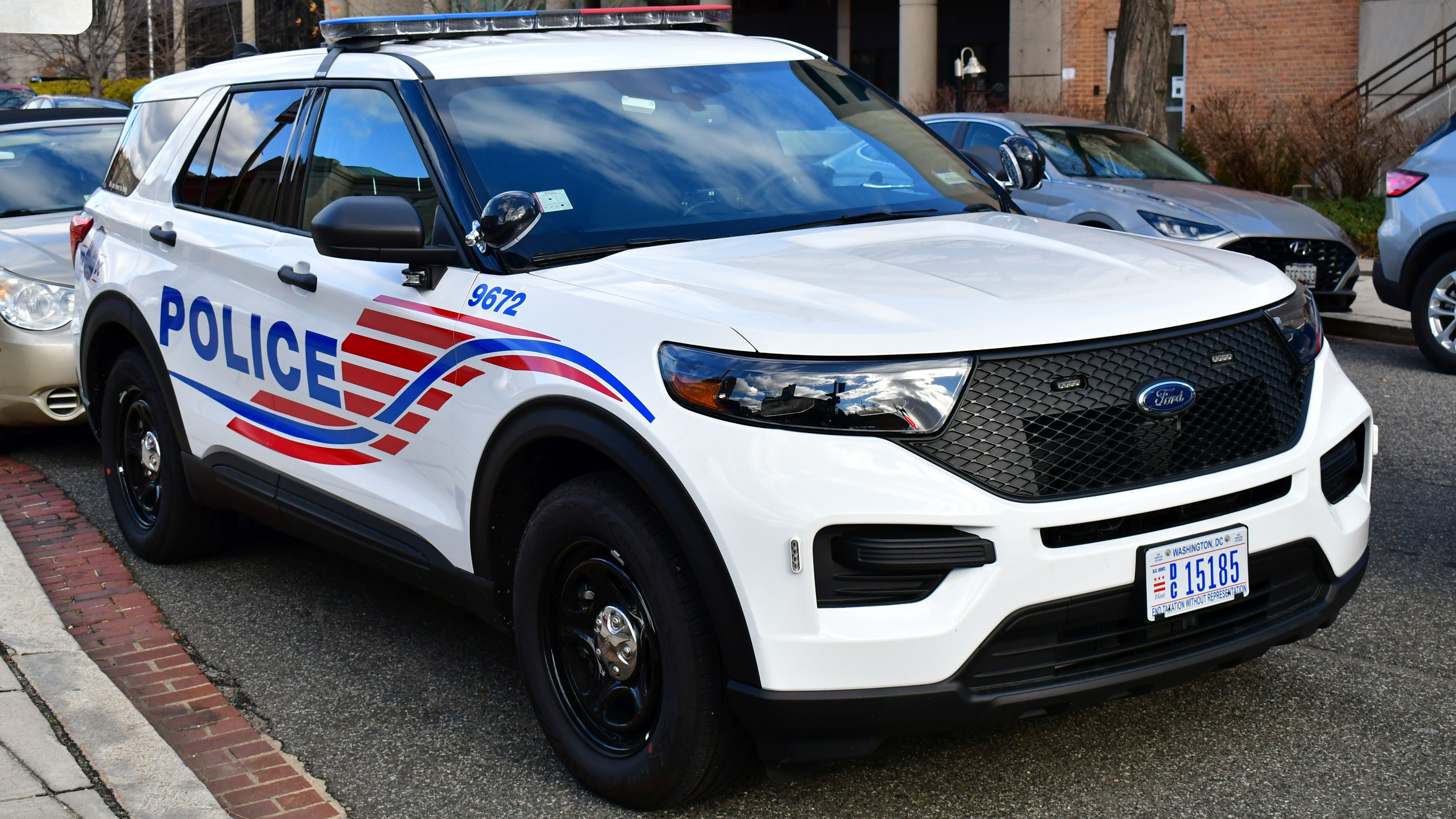
A second-generation FPIU used by the Metropolitan Police Department of the District of Columbia

The Ford Police Interceptor Utility (FPIU) nameplate was introduced as the SUV of the Ford Police Interceptor range for the 2013 model year, based on the fifth generation Ford Explorer.

The FPIU used the 3.7 liter V6 as its standard engine. The 3.5 liter EcoBoost engine from the SHO was an available option in 2014, producing 365 hp (272 kW; 370 PS). It comes with an all-wheel drive powertrain, larger brake rotors, advanced ABS and traction control systems, a more efficient cooling system, emergency equipment fitments, and other standard equipment. To free up interior space on the center console for equipment, the transmission is fitted with a column-mounted shifter. Other fleet-specific options are also included.

In 2019, for the 2020 model year, the second generation FPIU was introduced with a new rear wheel drive platform, based on the sixth-generation Ford Explorer. With the discontinuation of the FPIS in 2019, the FPIU is the only vehicle produced under the Ford Police Interceptor nameplate.

== Ford Police Responder ==
Ford Police Responder is a nameplate applied to Ford police vehicles that can be used as patrol vehicles, but are not intended to be used in "frontline" situations that are more suited for the Ford Police Interceptor range, such as highway patrol. It is often used alongside their Special Service Vehicle (SSV) designation, used for support-oriented vehicles that are designed for specific applications (such as prisoner transport or off-roading) or are not intended to take part in pursuits.

=== Police Responder Hybrid Sedan ===
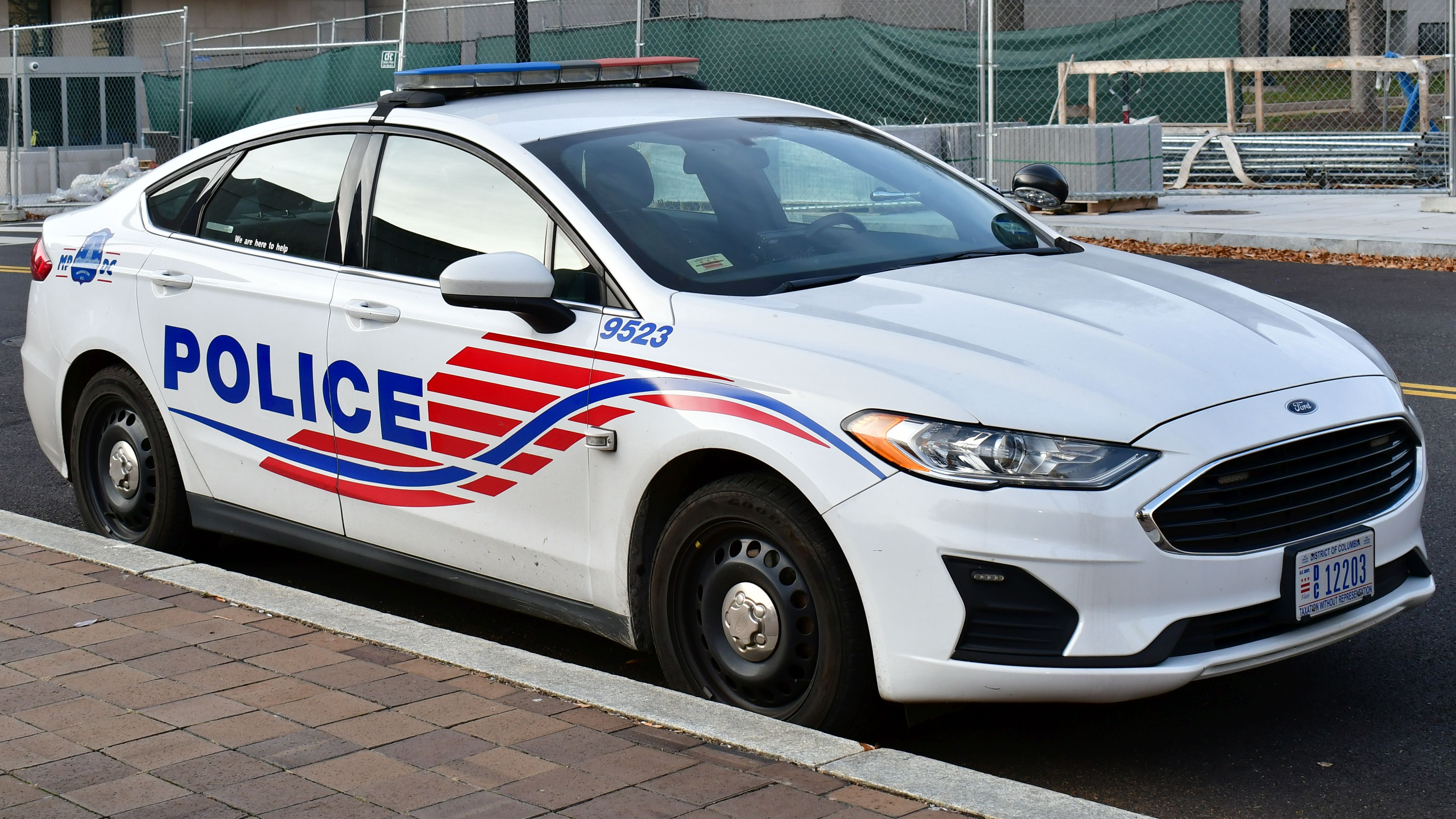
An FPRHS used by the Metropolitan Police Department of the District of Columbia

The Ford Police Responder Hybrid Sedan (FPRHS) was introduced for the 2019 model year, based on the second generation Ford Fusion Hybrid. Unlike the Ford Police Interceptor range, the FPRHS was intended for urban police departments that are less likely to be involved in high speed collisions compared to highway patrol. The FPRHS is the first pursuit-rated hybrid electric vehicle.

Reception to the FPRHS was mixed. The Salt Lake City Police Department purchased 110 units, but controversy arose when officers complained about its "unsafe" cramped seating space and lack of all-wheel drive capabilities, with several officers claiming it was "not suitable for patrol" and urging the city to purchase FPIUs instead. However, other police departments such as the New York City Police Department—which had already been using Fusions before the FPRHS's release—favored it for its fuel efficiency and maneuverability in dense city traffic.

The FPRHS was discontinued alongside the Ford Fusion in 2020.

=== F-150 Police Responder ===
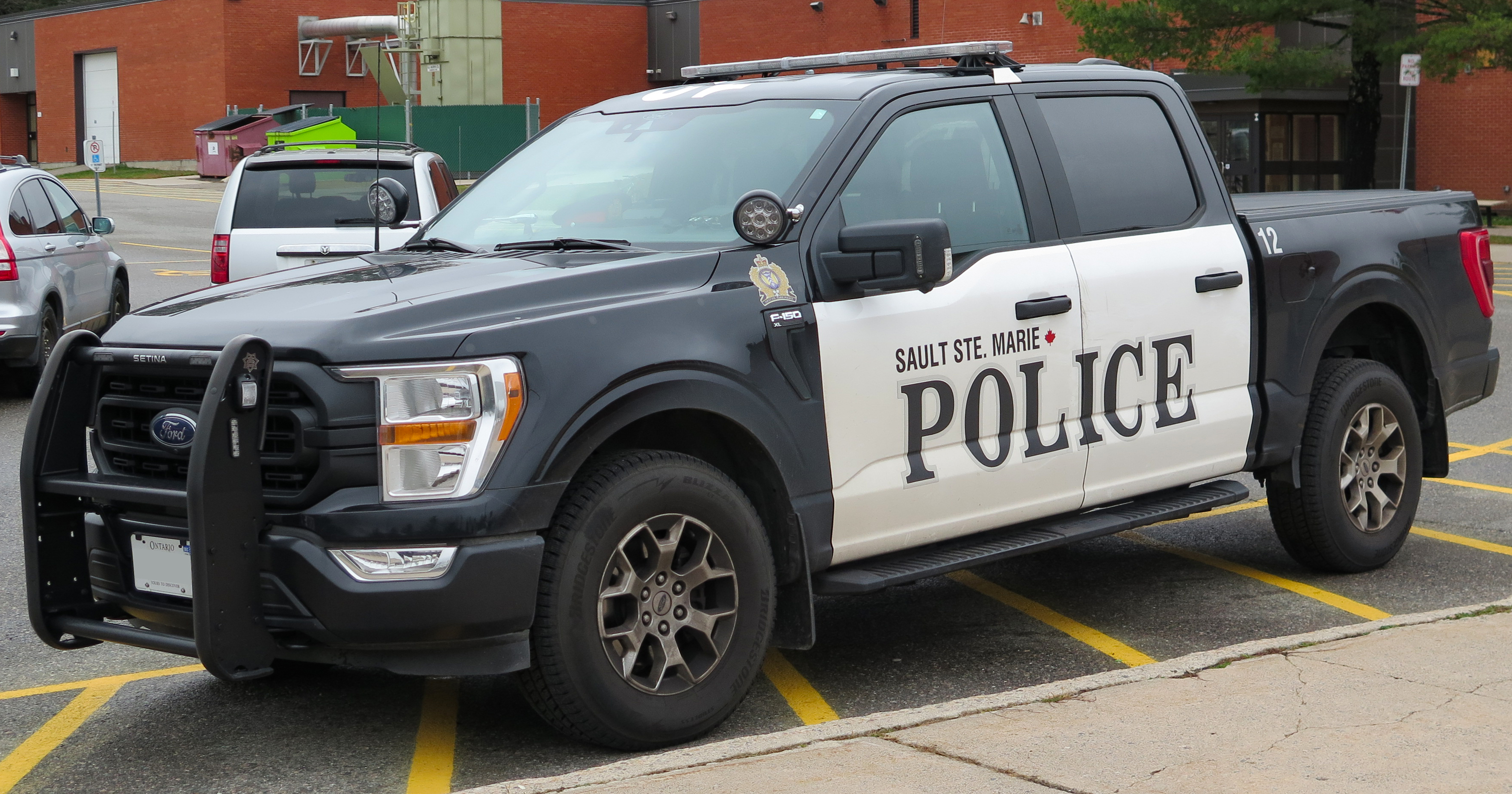
An F-150 Police Responder used by the Sault Ste. Marie Police Service

The Ford F-150 Police Responder was introduced for the 2018 model year, based on the thirteenth generation Ford F-Series, specifically a four-door SuperCrew cab with the FX4 off-road package. According to Ford, it is "the industry's first pursuit-rated pickup" and is designed to perform as an all-terrain patrol vehicle that is also capable of towing up to 7,000 pounds. It features a twin-turbo 3.5-liter V6, a 10-speed automatic transmission, a higher-output alternator, upgraded brakes, underbody skid plates, and a vinyl rear interior. 2021 tests by the Michigan State Police and Los Angeles County Sheriff's Department (who perform fleet vehicle performance testing to ensure police suitability before market release) found that the F-150 Police Responder was the "quickest" police vehicle available at the time, with 0–60 mph acceleration tests recorded at below 6 seconds and a top speed of approximately 150 mph.

=== F-150 SSV ===
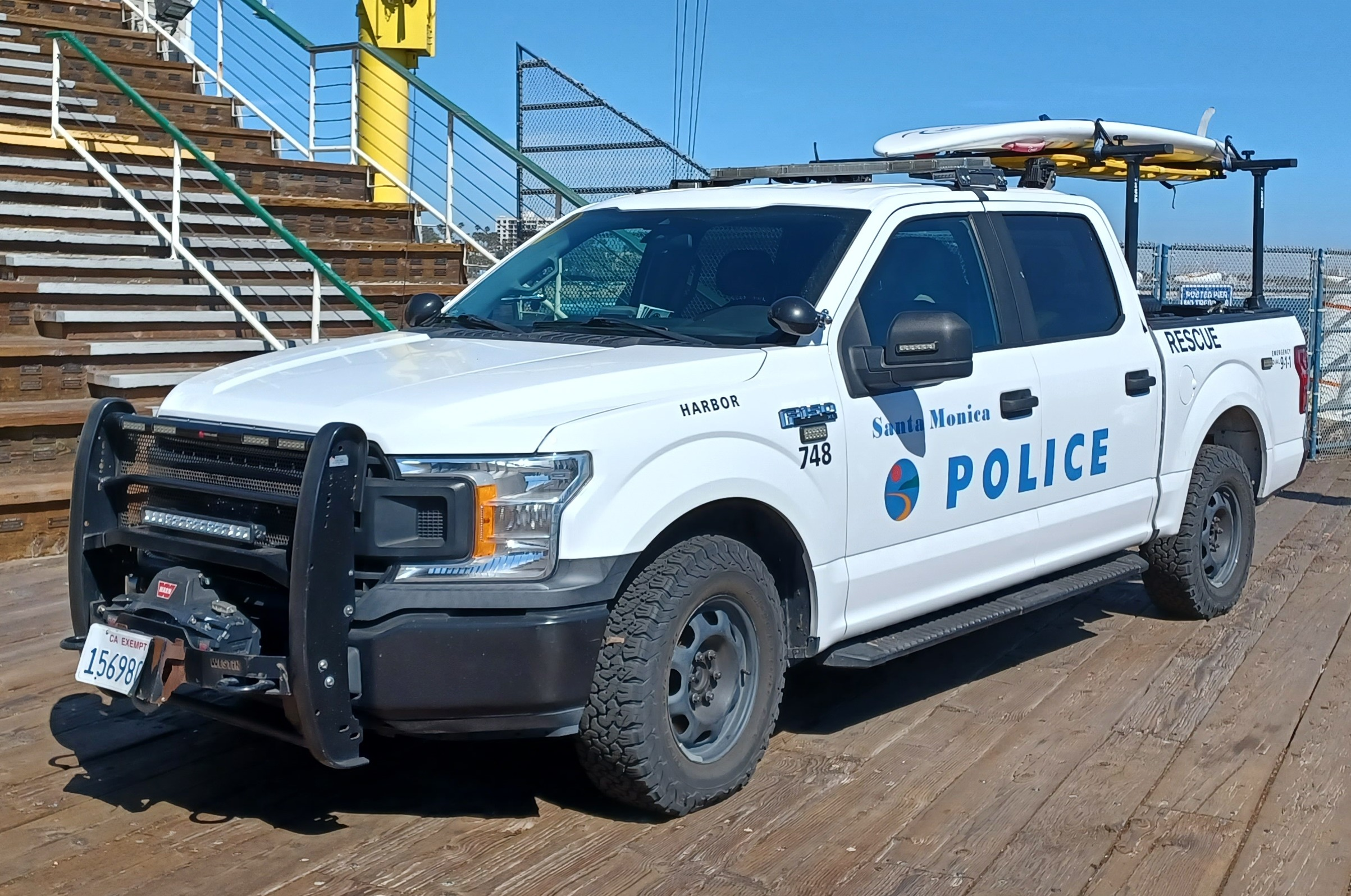
An F-150 SSV used by the Santa Monica Police Department

The Ford F-150 SSV was introduced for the 2013 model year. The 2018 is based on the thirteenth generation Ford F-Series. It is the utility towing-focused equivalent to the F-150 Police Responder, and is available in standard, XL CrewCab, and FX4 off-road packages. It features either a 5-liter V8, twin-turbo 3.5-liter V6, or 3.5-liter hybrid engine, a 10-speed automatic transmission, a higher-output alternator, and a vinyl rear interior.

=== F-150 Lightning Pro SSV ===
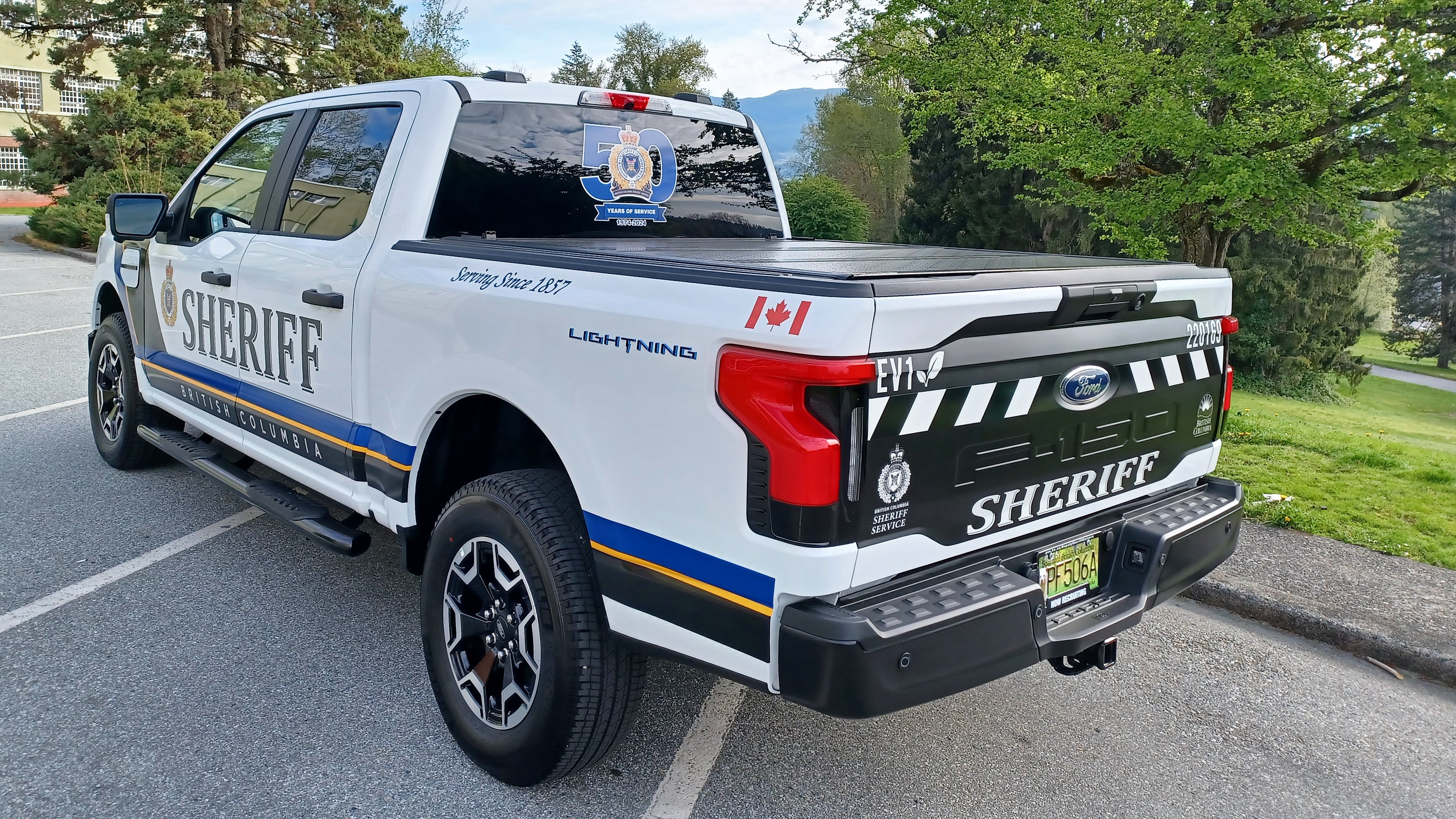
An F-150 Lightning Pro SSV used by the British Columbia Sheriff Service

The Ford F-150 Lightning Pro SSV was introduced for the 2023 model year, based on the Ford F-150 Lightning. As of 2025, it is the only electric vehicle in the Ford police vehicle lineup and is the first fully-electric vehicle to be certified for police use. It is largely similar to the standard F-150 Lightning, with some upgrades from the F-150 Police Responder, including front seatback steel intrusion plates, a modular dashboard for installing equipment, and a vinyl rear interior. It also features the F-150 Lightning's Pro Power Onboard inverter feature, which Ford advertises as a mobile power source for crime scenes.

=== Expedition SSV ===
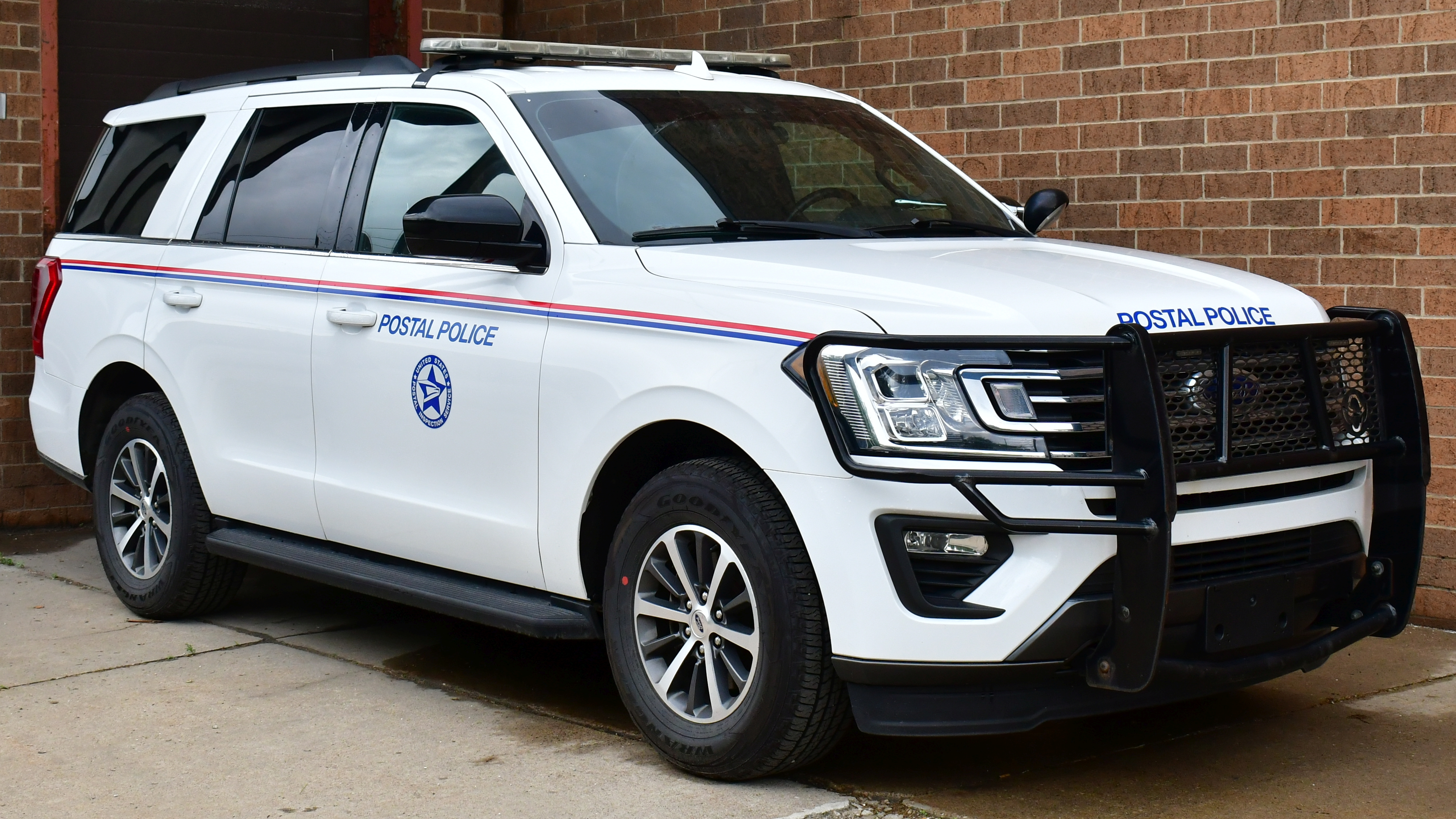
An Expedition SSV used by the United States Postal Inspection Service

The Ford Expedition SSV was introduced for the 2018 model year, based on the fourth generation Ford Expedition. Designed for heavy-duty and tactical applications, the Expedition SSV is "nearly a foot longer than the standard model" and is available in standard and MAX configurations. It features a twin-turbo 3.5-liter V6, a 10-speed automatic transmission, a higher-output alternator, an electronic limited-slip rear differential, police transport rear bench seats, and a vinyl rear interior.

=== Transit Prisoner Transport Vehicle ===
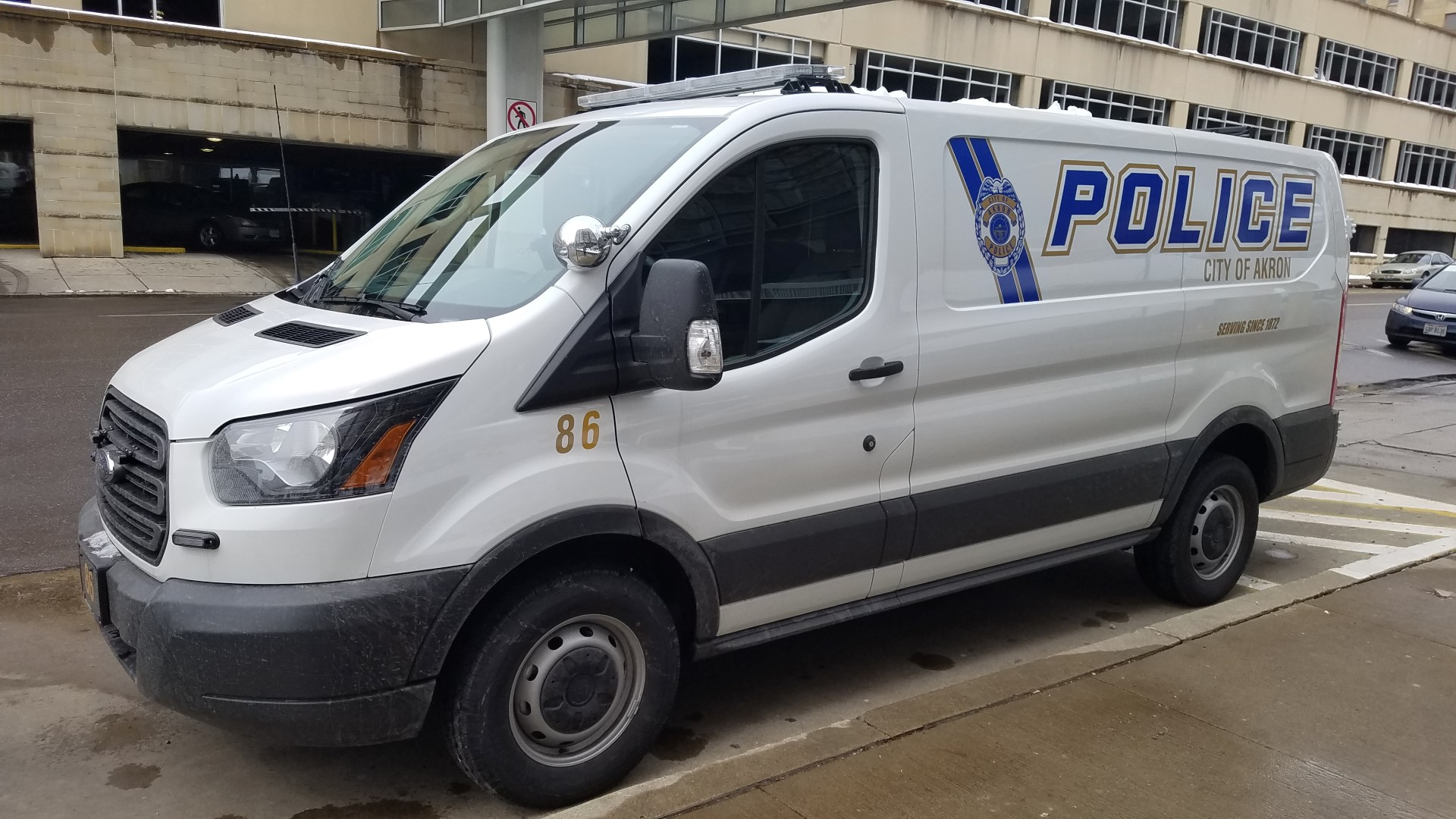
A Transit PTV used by the Akron Police Department

The Ford Transit Prisoner Transport Vehicle (PTV) was introduced for the 2015 model year, based on the fourth generation Ford Transit. Per its name, it is designed as a prisoner transport vehicle and is available in three roof heights, three lengths, and two wheelbases, as well as options for single, double, or triple prisoner inserts. It features a twin-turbo 3.5-liter V6 and intelligent all-wheel drive.

== Electric vehicles ==
As of June 2024, the only electric vehicle in the Ford police vehicle lineup is the F-150 Lightning Pro SSV. The Ford Mustang Mach-E, introduced for the 2021 model year, is used by several police forces in the United States and Canada and was offered to British police by Ford of Europe in 2021, but is not formally offered as a fleet vehicle. However, a Mustang Mach-E passed the 2021 fleet tests by the Michigan State Police, and 2024 fleet tests included a Mustang Mach-E alongside the Chevrolet Blazer EV PPV, suggesting Ford may be considering an official police variant to compete with the Blazer EV.

== Popularity ==
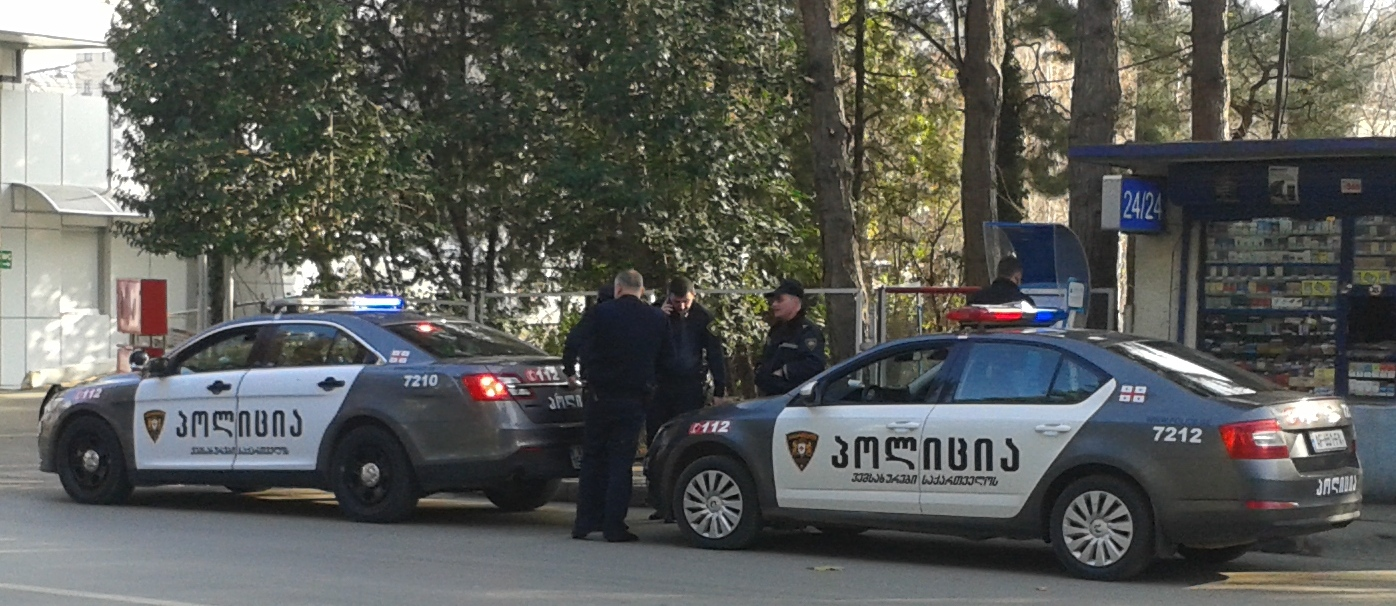
An FPIS (left) and a Škoda Octavia (right) used by the PPD.

While all of the Big Three automakers have offered police vehicles and had market shares proportionate to their overall market share, since the late 1990s Ford has had a near-monopoly on such vehicles in the United States, following General Motors discontinuing the B platform in 1996 and Chrysler discontinuing the M body vehicles in 1989. While GM (through Chevrolet) and Chrysler (through Dodge) continued to offer police vehicles after ending production of their last non-truck body-on-frame vehicles, and continue to do so today (Dodge as part of Chrysler successor Stellantis), many police forces continued to order from Ford due to their commitment to traditional body on frame construction and its ease of maintenance as opposed to vehicles with unibody construction. By the time Ford retired the Panther platform in 2011 without a body-on-frame replacement, they had gained such a significant market share from law enforcement agencies that they continued to order from Ford out of brand loyalty. Additionally, foreign automakers with major North American operations such as Toyota have never offered police vehicles in the United States, reducing the competition they face.

== See also ==
- Chevrolet 9C1
