= Department of the Army Civilian Police =

Civilian-staffed law enforcement agency of the U.S. Army

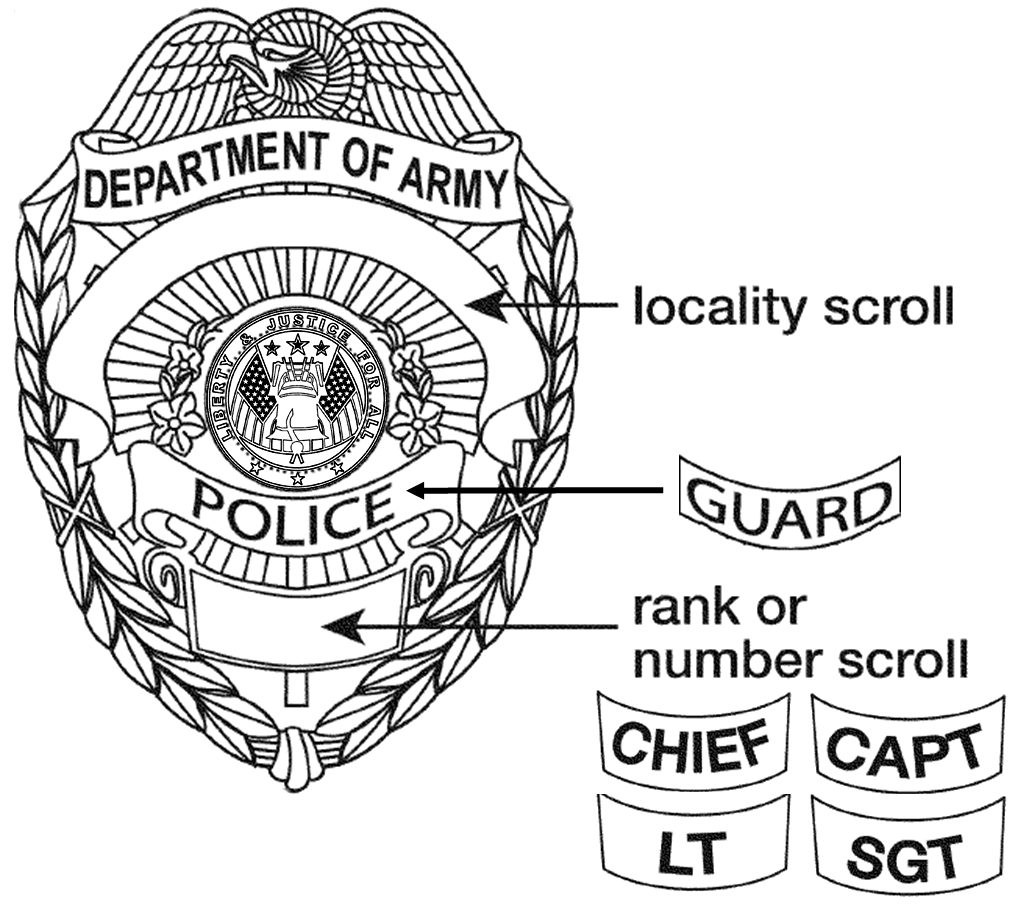
- Badges of the Department of the Army Civilian Police / Guard
- Abbreviation: DACP

Jurisdictional structure
- Federal agency: United States
- Operations jurisdiction: United States
- General nature: Federal law enforcement; Military provost

Operational structure
- Parent agency: United States Department of the Army

The Department of the Army Civilian Police (DACP), also known as the Department of the Army Police (DA Police), is the uniformed, civilian-staffed security police program of the United States Army. It provides professional, civilian, federal police officers to serve and protect U.S. Army personnel, properties, and installations. DACP personnel represent the Department of the Army's contribution to the Department of Defense police program. DACP law enforcement officers primarily work alongside the U.S. Army Military Police Corps, the Army service members who hold law enforcement military occupational specialities. DACP officers are supplemented by Department of the Army Security Guards, who are uniformed and armed federal security officers, primarily responsible for entry control and basic security tasks. Although the Army Criminal Investigation Division employs civilian special agents, it does not fall-under the DACP nor DoD Police umbrella.

== Civil service series 0083 (Police) ==
A Department of the Army civilian police officer (DACP) is assigned the federal occupational series code "0083", the code reserved for federal police officers and detectives in the civil service. These detectives and police officers investigate crimes that are not pursued by the CID.

== Civil service series 0085 (Guard) ==
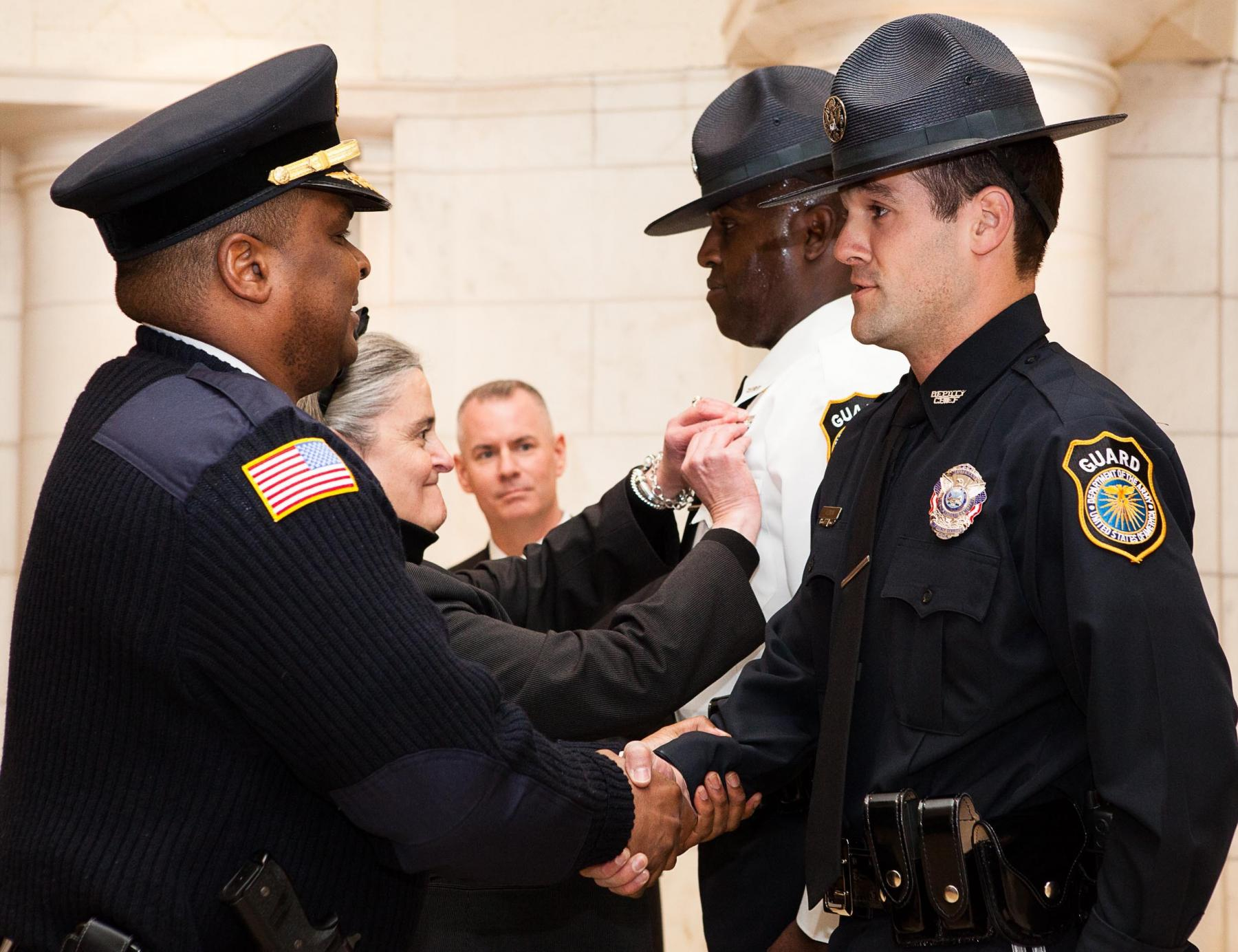
US Army Civilian Guard badging ceremony

A Department of the Army Guard (DASG) is an armed, uniformed, civilian guard that provides physical security and access control at US Army locations, in conjunction with DACP.

The uniform is almost identical to DACP, but with "GUARD" rather than "POLICE" on the shoulder patch and badge. The equipment and firearms are the same as DACP. The authority and jurisdiction are also identical to that of a DACP which is described in detail in the Jurisdiction and Authority section below.

== Jurisdiction and authority ==
According to the Department of the Army Regulation 190-56 (2013), both the Department of the Army (DA) Civilian Police (CP) and Security Guards (SG) have the authority to apprehend individuals who are found to have committed felonies, misdemeanors, breaches of the peace, threats to property of welfare, or actions that are detrimental to good order and discipline.

The authority for AR 190-56 originates from the US Constitution, which provides Congress the power to impose rules and regulations over the property of the United States (U.S. Const. art. IV., § 3, clause 2). Congress then authorized the Secretary of Defense, military commanders, and other authorized military officers to create defense property security regulations such as AR 190-56 (Internal Security Act of 1950, 50 U.S.C. § 797).

Apprehension is the equivalent to arrest in civilian terminology (Joint Service Committee on Military Justice, 2019, Rule 302). These apprehensions can only be conducted by military law enforcement officials. These individuals include security police, military police, master at arms, shore patrol, and other authorized persons (whose duties include investigative, guard, or police duties). Specifically listed in the following discussion paragraph are police, guards, civilian police, and civilian guards. The authorising regulations show no distinction between DACPs and DASGs regarding authority. As such, both DACPs and DASGs are listed as “military law enforcement officials”.

DACPs and DASGs authority is subject to limitations imposed by AR 190-56 and the Posse Comitatus Act. Execution of their authority is restricted to the bounds of the installation when on duty (Department of the Army, 2013). DACPs and DASGs are also limited on aid to civilian law enforcement (Posse Comitatus Act, 18 U.S. Code § 1385).

== Duties ==
At many installations, Department of Army Civilian Police officers augment military police personnel and are distributed throughout the chain of command of each installation's Directorate of Emergency Services.

Some installations have only civilian police (Fort McCoy) present while others work closely with military police. A newly hired officer can expect to perform a variety of law enforcement roles including patrol, crime-prevention, investigations, special reaction team, and police administrative functions.

=== Force Protection and Patrol ===
One major function of a Department of the Army Civilian Police officer is to conduct force protection duties. Department of the Army Civilian Police officers conduct law enforcement patrols within the installation and, depending on local policy, in areas off of the installation where military affiliated personnel frequent.

Officers patrol the installation and check that physical security measures such as fences and lighting are in good working order.

=== Traffic ===
An officer can conduct traffic stops for motor vehicle violations. Each base adopts the surrounding state's motor vehicle laws under the Assimilative Crimes Act (see Federal Jurisdiction).

There are two types of citations that may be issued: the DD Form 1408 Armed Forces Traffic Ticket, and the Central Violations Bureau Violation Notice (CVB).

- The type of citation(s) issued are authorized at the local command level. The DD Form 1408 does not have any monetary fines associated with it.
- The CVB does however establish fines and a hearing system through the U.S. Magistrate.

=== Calls for service ===
Department of the Army Civilian Police officers and military police personnel respond to all calls for law enforcement assistance that take place within the installation. If the crime is found to be a major felony, then the matter is generally referred to the special agents of the applicable military investigative agency (Army CID, Army Counterintelligence, NCIS, OSI, FBI, etc.) depending on the agency's purview.

There are increasing opportunities for participation in specialized roles. Department of the Army Civilian Police officers may serve as K-9 officers or members of a special reaction team (SRT).

== Requirements of DACP Officers ==
A major requirement of any potential Department of the Army Civilian Police officer is to pass a medical exam. There is typically an uncorrected vision requirement, candidates must have normal color vision, depth perception, and sufficiently good corrected vision.

Department of the Army Civilian Police officers are required to obtain and maintain a Secret clearance. The background investigation must show the candidate to be free of substantial debt or foreign influence. Under the Lautenberg Amendment, officers cannot have any convictions for domestic violence. Some installations may require an interview with the candidate.

Candidates are currently required to take and pass a physical fitness test. This test is a modified version of the test that is required by military members. Army regulations require the officers pass this test annually, something not typically required of local city or town police officers (though they may take one in their respective academies).

As of 2014 the Department of the Army no longer grants waivers to any patrol level officer, all interested candidates must now attend a 9-week academy at Fort Leonard Wood, MO.

== Training ==
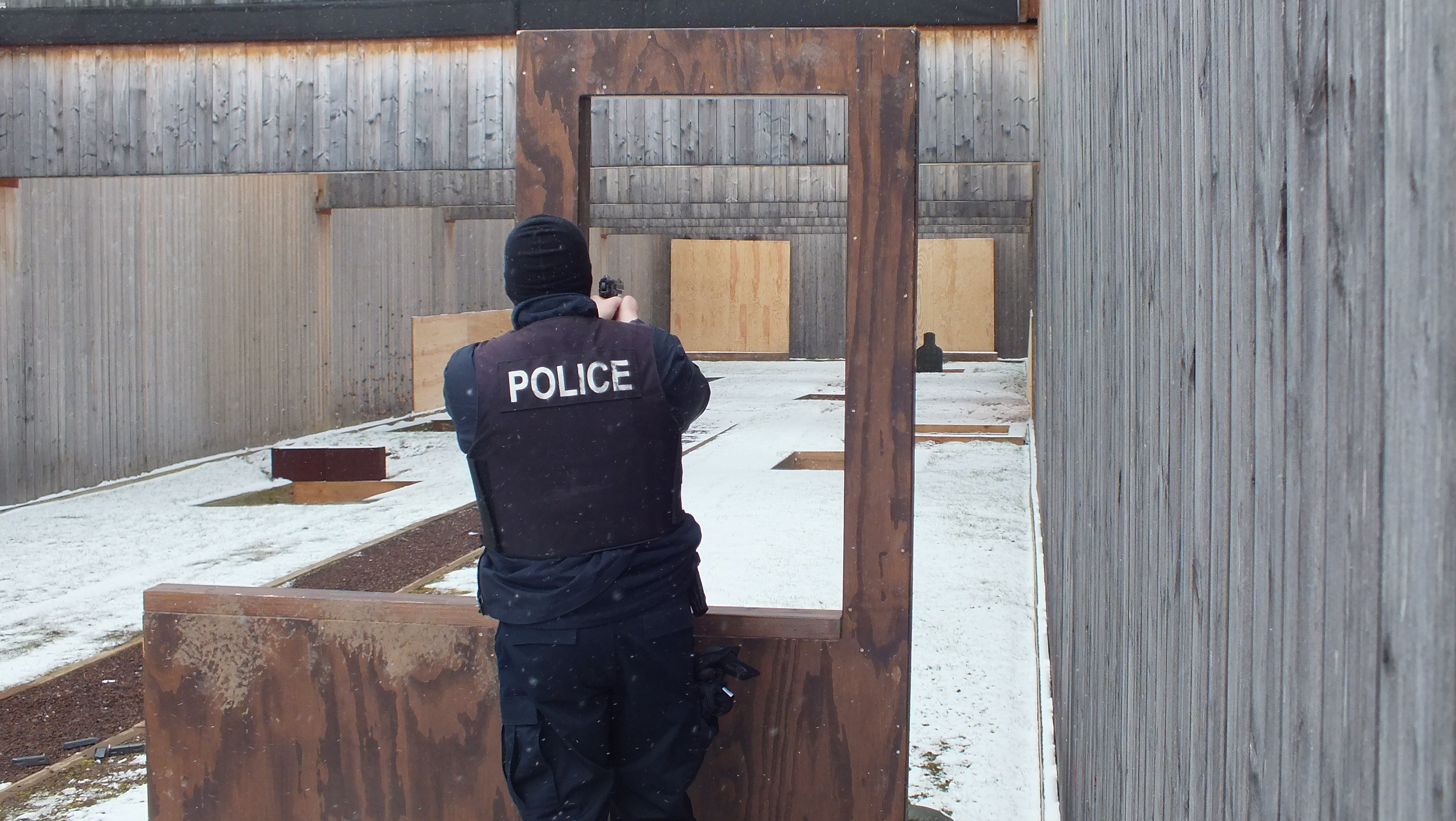
A DACP officer training on a firing range.

Department of the Army Civilian Police officers must attend a (resident) police academy approved by the Office of the Provost Marshal General (OPMG). The U.S. Army sends their civilian officers to a police academy that is a minimum of nine weeks long. A waiver of training may no longer be given by the OPMG, unless reclassifying from an 1811 (Federal Agent) to 0083 (Federal Police). Or transferring from another 0083 (Federal Police) agency and have completed a DoD approved or VA approved course.

There is one academy in Missouri. They give an overview of topics such as IED detection, basic patrolling techniques, the Uniform Code of Military Justice, physical security concepts, and other police skills.

This academy is designed around the specific needs of the US Army, and do not resemble a state or FLETC run academy. However, the DACP Academy is accredited by the Federal Law Enforcement Training Accreditation (FLETA) organization. FLETA also accredits FLETC, the U.S. Marshals Service, the FBI and numerous other federal law enforcement agencies.

The curriculum in these academies is based upon the same topics that a military member would learn in their advanced individual training schools after basic training. Annual in-service training for the DACP (sometimes called "annual sustainment training") normally totals about two hundred and forty hours a year. This refresher training is conducted in conjunction with the officer's military member counterparts.

Officers selected for a position on an installation's special reaction team (SRT) must attend the same training as their military counterparts. Training is held at Fort Leonard Wood in Missouri.

Department of the Army Civilian Police officers are highly trained and skilled professionals, many of whom have prior law enforcement and military experience. Post 9-11, Police Departments have tightened their professional standards. Both classroom training and physical training have been intensified in response to real world terrorist threats.

== Rank Structure ==
DACP rank structure is similar to other police, federal police and DoD law-enforcement agencies. Rank insignia is very similar to the US Army's rank insignia.

=== Table ===
Rank structure of the Department of the Army Civilian Police

Rank	Director/Chief	Deputy Director/Deputy Chief	Captain	Lieutenant	Sergeant	Officer
Insignia						No insignia

== Uniform and Equipment ==
=== Uniform ===
Department of Army Civilian Police wear a dark blue style uniform, similar to other DOD Police, in two formats:

- Standard - dark blue trousers, shirt, necktie, campaign hat, v-neck jumper, windbreaker jacket
- Utility - similar to above, but metal is generally removed and the ball cap is worn, with no tie

Some officers, on certain duties, may wear an overt equipment vest with "POLICE" or "DASG" markings and DACP/DASG insignia as appropriate.

There is a specific DACP shoulder patch, badge and the rank insignia is worn on both uniforms.

DACP officers who serve in a game warden capacity wear a tan-brown uniform, but keep the DACP patches and badges.

=== Firearms and Equipment ===
DACP Police Officers are armed with a Beretta 92, designated as M9 service pistol, or the Sig Sauer P320 designated M17 in Level 3 retention holster, spare magazines in pouches, as well as a Taser stun gun, baton, OC spray, handcuffs in pouch, radio, torch, first aid kit and notebook & pen.

Wet weather kit, traffic vests and cold weather kit is also issued when necessary.

DACP also may use flak vests (body armour), Kevlar helmets, protective masks and the such like.

=== Vehicles ===
DACP Police use the same vehicles as their active duty counterparts in the Military Police, such as the Chevrolet Impala and Ford Police Interceptor, with a wide variety of liveries, colours and decals. All are equipped with red, blue, white - or a combination of - flashing beacons.

== Notable events ==
- Fort Bliss gunman.
- Land mine incident at Fort Gordon.
- The 2009 Fort Hood shooting.
- Fort Drum shooting in 2008.
- 2007 Fort Dix attack plot
- Fort Bragg "Sniper" - William Kreutzer, Jr.

== Officers killed in line of duty ==
- Police Officer Harry S. White
- Forest Ranger John Sidney Mott
- Police Officer Albee V. Forney
- Sergeant Dennis H. Marcotte
- Police Officer Patrick Sirois. Cause of death: vehicle collision. End of watch: 23 November 2010.
- Police Officer Jonathan M. Gumm. Cause of death: heart attack. End of watch: 29 July 2021.

== See also ==
- List of United States federal law enforcement agencies
- Military Police Corps (United States)
