= Interceptor =

Interceptor may refer to:

== Arts and entertainment ==
=== Film and television ===
- The Interceptor, a British drama series on BBC One
- Interceptor (game show), a British television game show that ran during 1989
- Interceptor (film), a 2022 film starring Elsa Pataky and Luke Bracey
- "Angel Interceptor", a fictional aircraft piloted by the Angels in the 1967 TV series Captain Scarlet and the Mysterons
  - "Falcon Interceptor", in New Captain Scarlet
- SHADO Interceptor, a fictional type of military spacecraft in the TV series UFO
- Pursuit Special or Last of the V8 Interceptors, a muscle car in the fictional Mad Max franchise
- Turbo Interceptor, a fictional car in the 1986 film The Wraith
- HMS Interceptor, a fictional Royal Navy warship from the 2003 film Pirates of the Caribbean: The Curse of the Black Pearl

=== Music ===
- "Angel Interceptor", a 1995 song from the album 1977 by Ash

=== Video games ===
- Interceptor, a 1976 video game by Taito, created by Tomohiro Nishikado
- TIE Interceptor, a series of fictional starfighters in the Star Wars universe
- F/A-18 Interceptor, a 1988 Amiga game by Electronic Arts
- X-COM: Interceptor, a 1998 flight-sim/tactical strategy game from the X-COM series
- Interceptor Micros, a former Amstrad CPC, Commodore 64 and ZX Spectrum video game developer

== Plumbing and civil engineering ==
- Interceptor drain, a type of French drain often used in storm sewer systems
- Interceptor sewer, a large pipe in urban sanitary sewers
- Grease interceptor or grease trap
- Petrol interceptor, a trap to separate hydrocarbons from rainwater runoff

== Science, technology and military ==
- Interceptor pattern, in software design and aspect-oriented programming
- Milbemycin oxime (brand name Interceptor), a heartworm preventative veterinary medication marketed by Novartis
- Interceptor missile, a type of defensive missile used against other missiles in flight
- Interceptor Body Armor, an advanced form of combat protection currently fielded by the United States military

== Vehicles ==
=== Automobiles ===
- Ford Police Interceptor, a range of North American police cars
  - Ford Crown Victoria Police Interceptor, 1992–2011
  - Ford Police Interceptor Sedan, 2012–2019
  - Ford Police Interceptor Utility, 2012–
- Ford Interceptor, a 2007 concept car built on a stretched version of the Ford D2C platform
- Jensen Interceptor, an automobile marque

=== Other vehicles ===
- Interceptor aircraft or interceptor, a type of fighter aircraft
- Interceptor 400, a civilian aircraft marque
  - Interceptor Corporation, a former US firm that developed the Interceptor 400
- Long Range Interceptor, a fast small watercraft
- Honda Interceptor (disambiguation), a motorcycle brand
- Royal Enfield Interceptor, a motorcycle
- USS Interceptor, former radar picket ship
- Lockheed interceptor (disambiguation), several types of aircraft

== See also ==
- Intercept (disambiguation)
- Interception (disambiguation)
- Police Interceptor (disambiguation)
