= Intercept =

Intercept may refer to:

- X-intercept, the point where a line crosses the x-axis
- Y-intercept, the point where a line crosses the y-axis
- Interception, a play in various forms of football
- The Mona Intercept, a 1980 thriller novel by Donald Hamilton
- Operation Intercept, an anti-drug measure announced by President Nixon
- Telephone tapping, the monitoring of telephone and Internet conversations by a third party
- Tax refund intercept
- Samsung Intercept (SPH-M910), an Android smartphone
- Visual Intercept, a Microsoft Windows-based software defect tracking system
- Intermodulation Intercept Point, a measure of an electrical device's linearity
- Intercept message, a telephone recording informing the caller that the call cannot be completed
- The Intercept, an American left-wing news organization
- Intercept Fund, a non-profit organization

== See also ==
- Interception (disambiguation)
- Interceptor (disambiguation)
- Intercept theorem, an important theorem in elementary geometry about the ratios of various line segments
