= Police Interceptor =

Police interceptor may refer to:

- Several Ford police vehicles, including:
  - Ford Police Interceptor Sedan (2013–2019), based on the Ford Taurus
  - Ford Police Interceptor Utility (2012–present), based on the Ford Explorer
  - Ford Crown Victoria Police Interceptor (1992–2011)

== See also ==
- Police car
- Police Interceptors, UK documentary show
- The Pursuit Special from the Mad Max films
- Interceptor (disambiguation)
