= RiverRecyle =

Finnish environmental technology company

RiverRecycle Oy
- Type: Private
- Industry: Environmental technology; Waste management; Recycling
- Founded: 2019; 7 years ago
- Headquarters: Helsinki, Finland
- Area served: Worldwide
- Products: Recycled plastic boards; PET bottle bales; Plastic credit mechanism
- Services: River waste collection; Circular economy models
- Website: www.riverrecycle.com

RiverRecycle is a Finnish environmental technology company founded in Helsinki in 2019, focused on removing plastic pollution from rivers globally and converting collected plastics waste into recycled products through community-based circular economy models.

== Objectives ==
- Intercept river-borne plastic waste before it reaches oceans.
- Provide local employment opportunities and support community-based waste management systems.
- Reinforce a circular economy by turning low-value plastics into value-added products like recycled boards and PET bales.

== History and expansion ==
- 2019: Company founded in Helsinki.
- Rapid expansion into India, Indonesia, Bangladesh, Philippines, and Ghana, with 11–19 operational sites and dozens more in development.
- By 2024, over 4 million kg of plastic was collected globally.

== Products and Business Model ==
- RiverRecycle Boards: durable boards made from low-value plastic, suitable for construction or furniture.
- PET bales: collected and processed PET sold internationally.
- Plastic credit mechanism: generating revenue via certified plastic collection credits to fund operations.

== Impact and Achievements ==
- Over 4 million kg of river plastic collected as of 2024.
- In Ghana’s Kpeshie Lagoon region:
  - 3 collection sites intercepting about 24 tones/year of floating plastic.
  - Capacity to recycle 330 tones of low-value plastic + 360 tones of PET bottles annually.
  - Creation of 50 formal jobs and engagement of 200 informal waste pickers.
- Employment generation: approximately 15–50 local jobs per project + incomes for waste pickers.
- Recognized by the Finland Green Product Award for sustainable river cleaning strategies.
