= Interception (disambiguation) =

An interception is the catching of a pass by a player on an opposing sports team.

Interception may also refer to:

== Law and military ==
- Signals intelligence, an interception of signals
- Telephone tapping, the interception of a phone call
  - Lawful interception, telephone tapping by authorities
- Interception procedure, military aircraft escorting other aircraft

== Other uses ==
- Intercepted (film), a 2024 Ukrainian-Canadian-French documentary film
- Interception (water), the interception of precipitation by vegetation
- Interception, a medical term for post-coital contraception
- Tax refund interception, the forcible use of a tax refund to pay an outstanding obligation

== See also ==
- Intercept (disambiguation)
- Interceptor (disambiguation)
