= Intercept Fund =

Nonprofit focused on preventing respiratory illness

Intercept
- Established: 2026
- Legal status: Foundation
- Purpose: Preventing respiratory illness
- Co-Heads: Nan Ransohoff; Charlie Petty
- Website: https://www.interceptfund.com/

Intercept is a philanthropic initiative founded in 2026 with the goal of eliminating respiratory illness such as the common cold and COVID-19. It was created with US$500 million in funding from sources including Stripe, OpenAI, Anthropic, and Bill Gates.

The initiative was founded by Nan Ransohoff, an executive at Stripe, and Charlie Petty, a venture capitalist. Ransohoff stated she was inspired to create Intercept after a conversation with David Veesler, a professor of biochemistry at the University of Washington, who argued it was feasible to develop countermeasures against the broad variety of viruses that make up the common cold. Intercept plans to give grants for treatments and medical technologies that are already researched but are not yet developed for a commercial market. After passing a clinical trial or proof of concept stage, Ransohoff hopes pharmaceutical companies will help further develop products and bring them to market. Potential technologies include vaccines, nasal sprays, and air filtration including UVC germicidal lamps.
