= The Mona Intercept =

Novel by Donald Hamilton

- Paperback original
- Author: Donald Hamilton
- Language: English
- Genre: Thriller novel
- Publisher: Fawcett Gold Medal
- Publication date: 1980
- Publication place: United States
- Media type: Print (Paperback)
- Pages: 510 pp
- ISBN: 0-449-14374-0
- OCLC: 7067071

The Mona Intercept is a thriller novel by Donald Hamilton.

== Plot summary ==
Cuban exile Jimmy Columbus uses hijacking on the high seas, drugs, and murder to fuel his dreams of an empire.

== Publication history ==
- 1980, US, Fawcett Gold Medal, ISBN 0-449-14374-0, paperback
