= Ford Crown Victoria Police Interceptor =

Police car variant of the Ford Crown Victoria

Ford Crown Victoria Police Interceptor (CVPI)
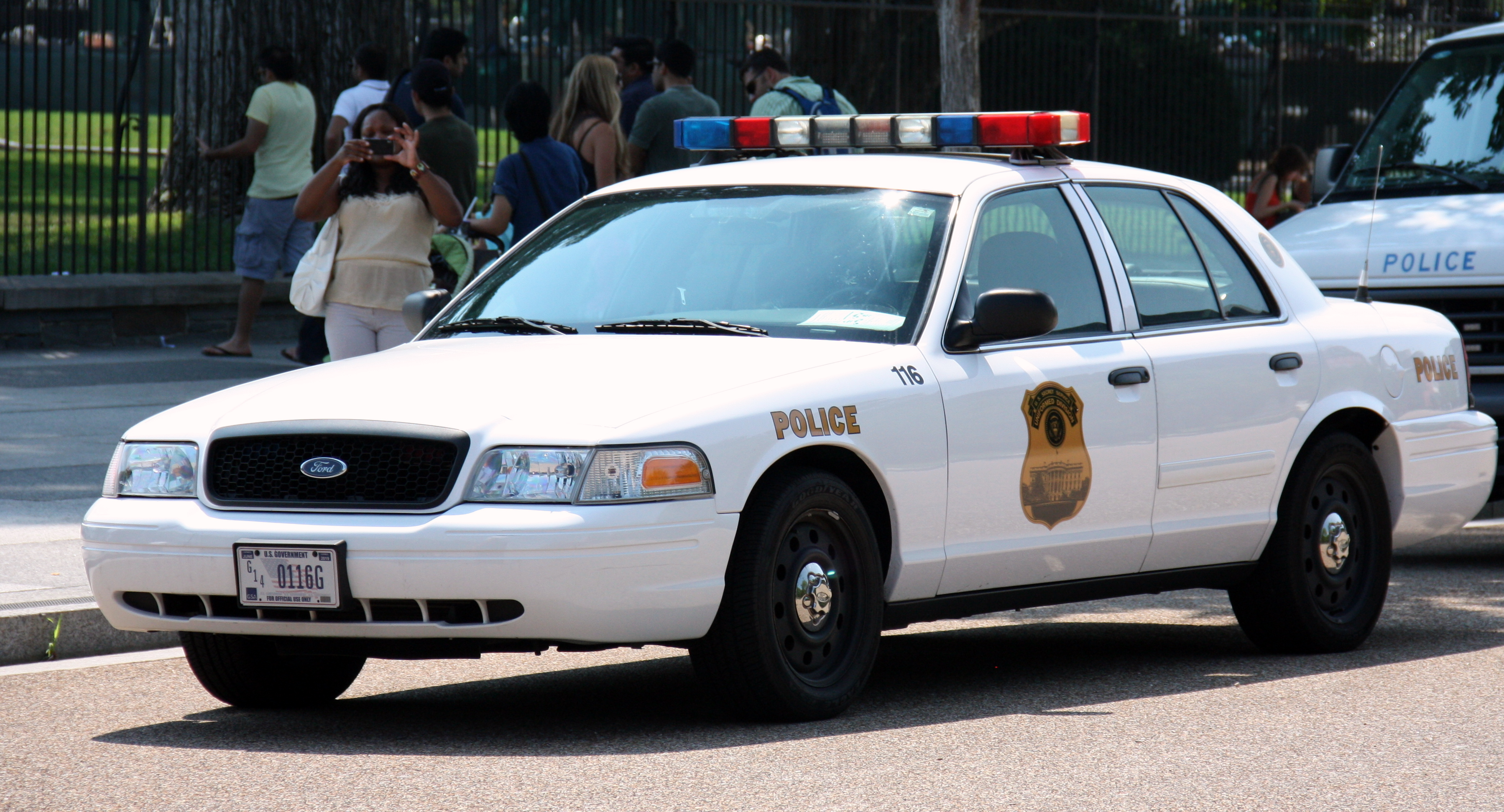
- A second-generation CVPI used by the United States Secret Service

Overview
- Manufacturer: Ford
- Also called: Ford Crown Victoria P71 (1998–2009); Ford Crown Victoria P7B (2010–2011)
- Production: 1992–2011
- Assembly: Canada: Talbotville, Southwold, Ontario (St. Thomas Assembly)

Body and chassis
- Class: Full-size car Police Interceptor
- Body style: 4-door sedan
- Layout: FR layout
- Platform: Panther

Chronology
- Successor: Ford Police Interceptor Sedan; Ford Police Interceptor Utility

The Ford Crown Victoria Police Interceptor (colloquially referred to as the CVPI, P71, or P7B, or Crown Vic) is a four-door, body-on-frame sedan that was manufactured by Ford from 1992 to 2011. It is the police car version of the Ford Crown Victoria and was the first vehicle to use the Ford Police Interceptor name.

From 1997 to 2013, the Ford Crown Victoria Police Interceptor was the most widely used automobile in law enforcement fleets in North America, mainly the United States, Canada and Mexico. It also saw use on a smaller scale with police forces in other regions, primarily in Europe and the Middle East.

== History ==
After the discontinuation of the Chevrolet Caprice, the Ford Motor Company held a near-monopoly on the market for police vehicles in the United States and Canada for over a decade. The conventional rear-wheel drive, V8 power, and body-on-frame construction were considered advantageous for police use. The body-on-frame construction allowed inexpensive repairs after collisions without the need to straighten the chassis. Rear-wheel drive was deemed better for hard maneuvers and more robust than the front-wheel-drive competition for rough driving over curbs and other obstacles in the urban environment.

Although CVPIs were not sold directly to the general public by the manufacturer, they were widely available in North America as used vehicles after being decommissioned. The cars were in demand by taxi companies and others who wanted a safe, durable, and/or inexpensive car, and those who needed a car with a large back seat.

The CVPI came equipped with many heavy-duty parts, such as a revised transmission, and a 186 kW (253 PS; 249 hp) engine. Used versions are normally stripped of any police decals, equipment, police radios, and emergency lights before being sold or auctioned to the public.

== First generation (1992–1997) ==
First generation
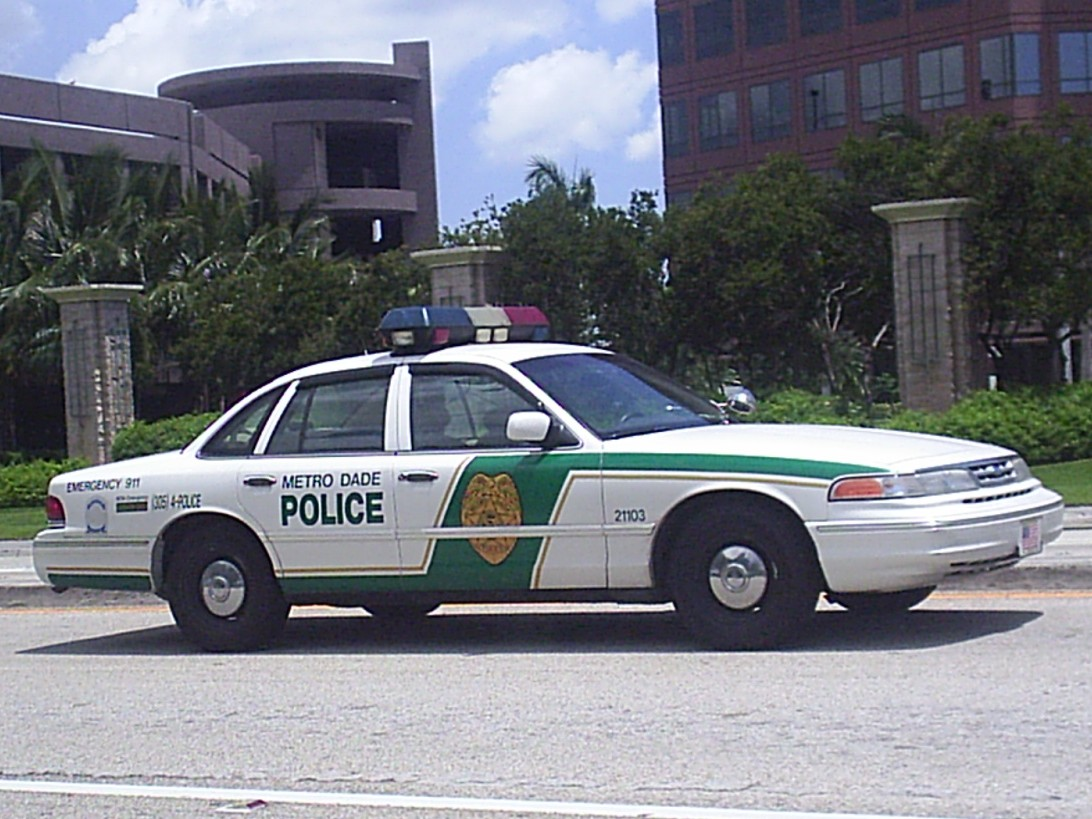
- Front facelift

Overview
- Production: February 1992–1997

Body and chassis
- Related: Mercury Grand Marquis; Lincoln Town Car

Powertrain
- Engine: 4.6 L Modular V8
- Transmission: 4-speed AOD/AOD-E automatic 4-speed 4R70W automatic

Dimensions
- Wheelbase: 114.4 in (2,906 mm)
- Length: 1992–1994: 212.4 in (5,395 mm); 1995–97: 212.0 in (5,385 mm)
- Width: 77.8 in (1,976 mm)
- Height: 1992–1994: 56.7 in (1,440 mm); 1995–97: 56.8 in (1,443 mm)

Though the name has been officially in use since 1992, the 1979–1991 full-sized LTDs and LTD Crown Victorias used the "P72" production code designation for both fleet and taxi and police models, with the model itself being internally classified as S (similar to LX). From 1992 to 1997, the police car models of the Crown Victoria (both base and LX trims) were officially known as Crown Victoria P71s. The first force to take delivery of Crown Victoria P71s was the London Police Service of London, Ontario in Canada, ordering 21 for delivery during February 1992; the first Crown Victoria from this order was driven off the St Thomas production line by London police chief Julian Fantino.

In the 1993 model year, the Crown Victoria was given a chrome front grille and a reflector strip between the taillights. Another minor restyle followed suit in 1995, with a new grille and taillights. To accommodate the design of the 1995 model's new taillights, the rear license plate was moved from the bumper to the trunk lid.

For 1996, the Crown Victoria badge on the front fenders was removed and the cars received a new steering wheel; 1997 models have a lighter blue interior color compared to prior years.

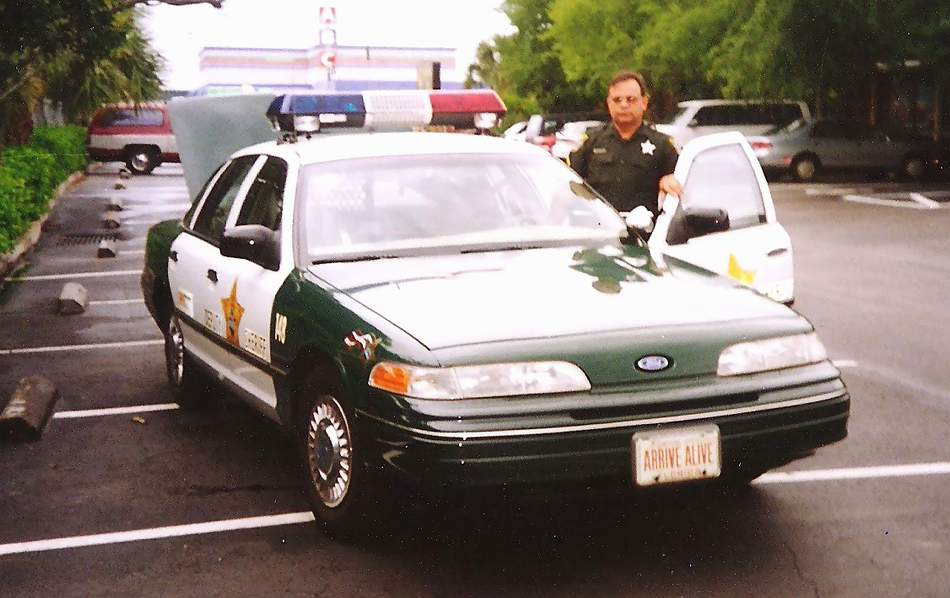
Front (pre-facelift)

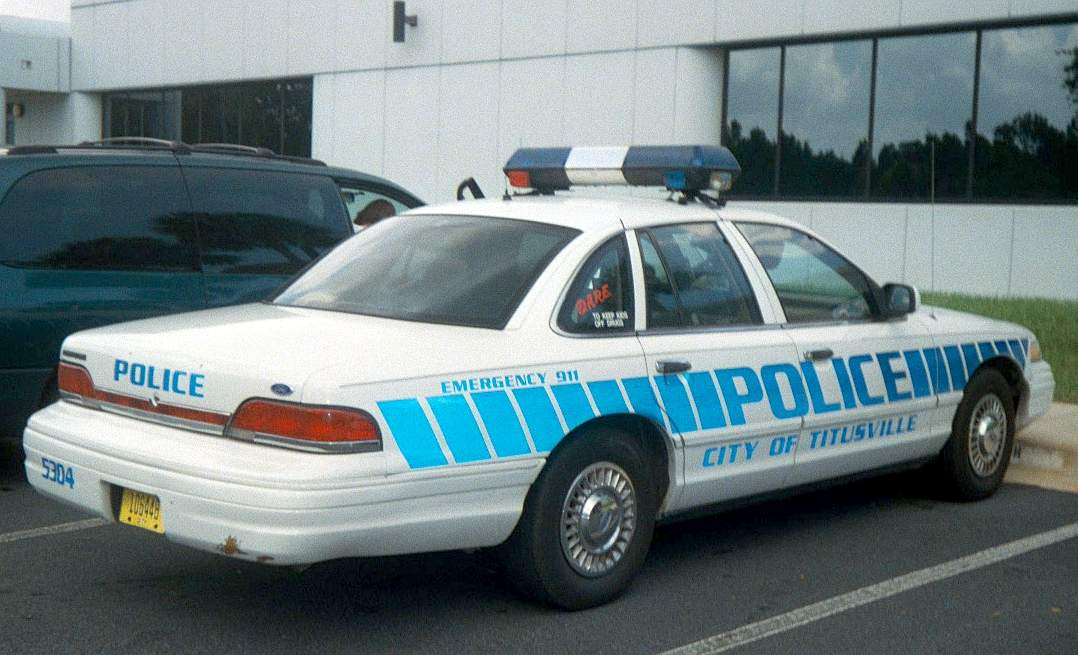
Rear (pre-facelift)

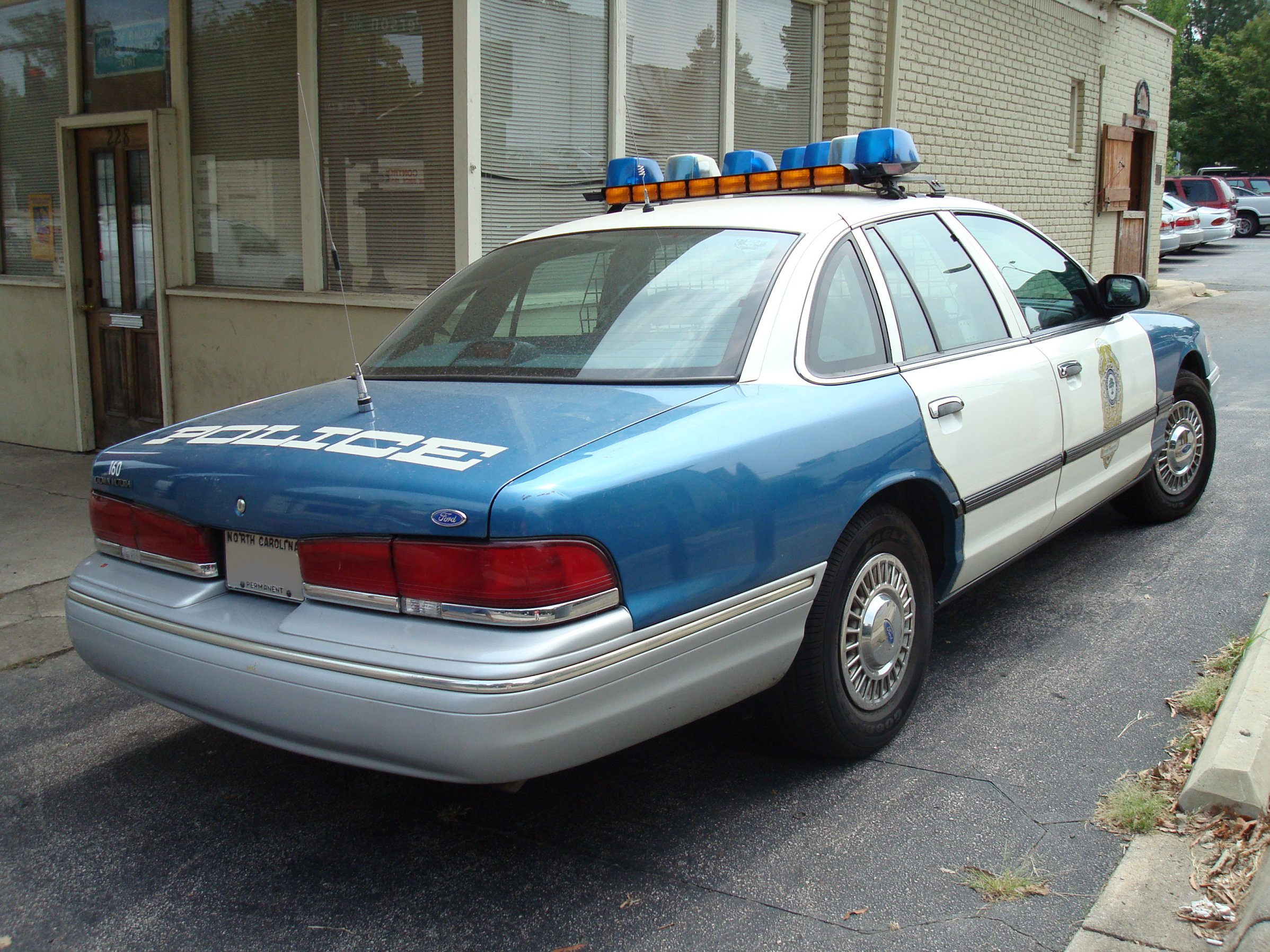
Rear facelift

== Second generation (1998–2011) ==
Second generation
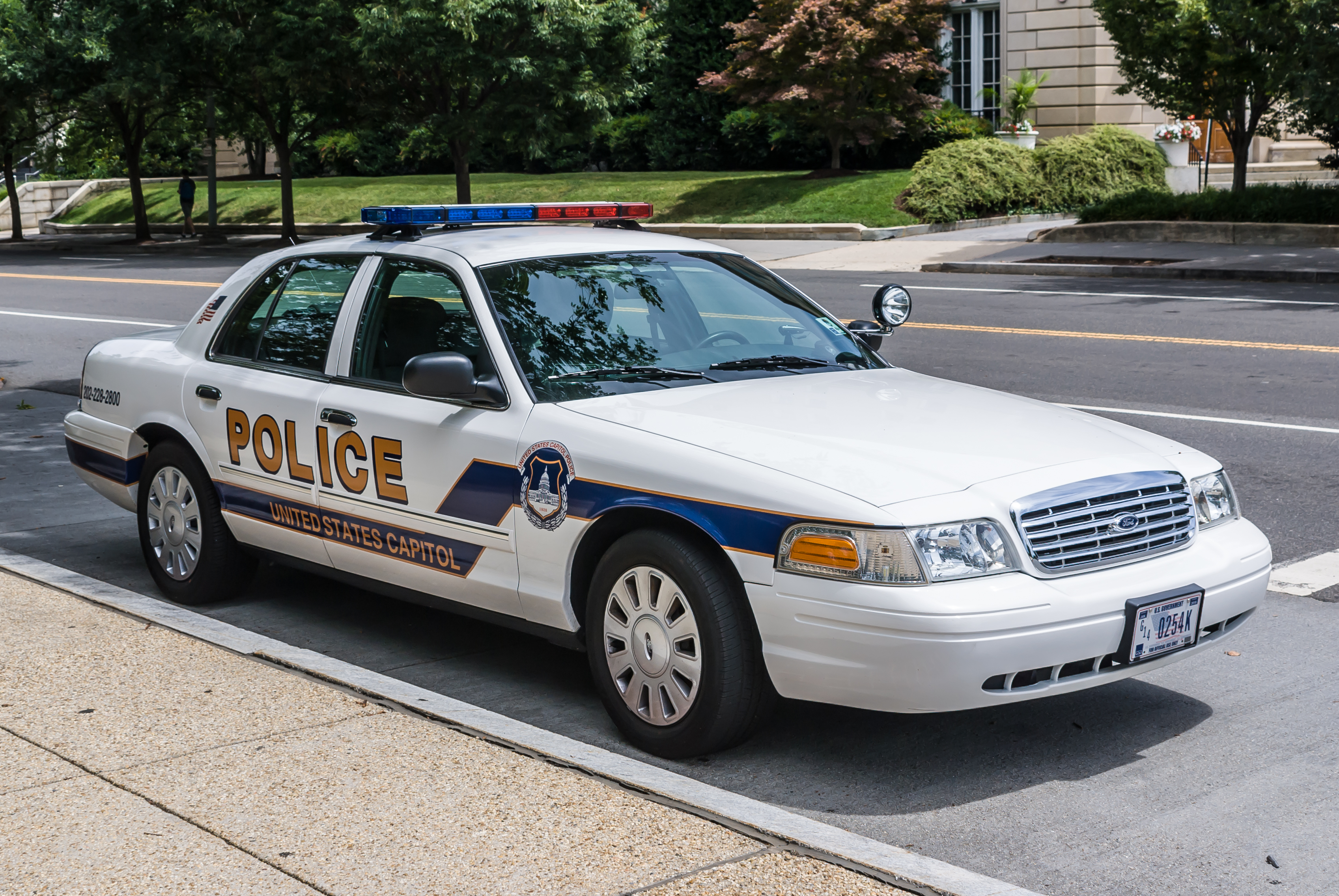

Overview
- Production: 1998–2011

Body and chassis
- Related: Mercury Grand Marquis; Mercury Marauder; Lincoln Town Car

Powertrain
- Engine: 4.6 L Modular V8
- Transmission: 4-speed 4R75W automatic 4-speed 4R70W automatic

Dimensions
- Wheelbase: 114.7 in (2,913 mm)
- Length: 212.0 in (5,385 mm)
- Width: 2007: 77.3 in (1,963 mm); 1998–2006: 78.2 in (1,986 mm)
- Height: 1998–2001, 2006–2011: 56.8 in (1,443 mm); 2002–05: 58.3 in (1,481 mm)

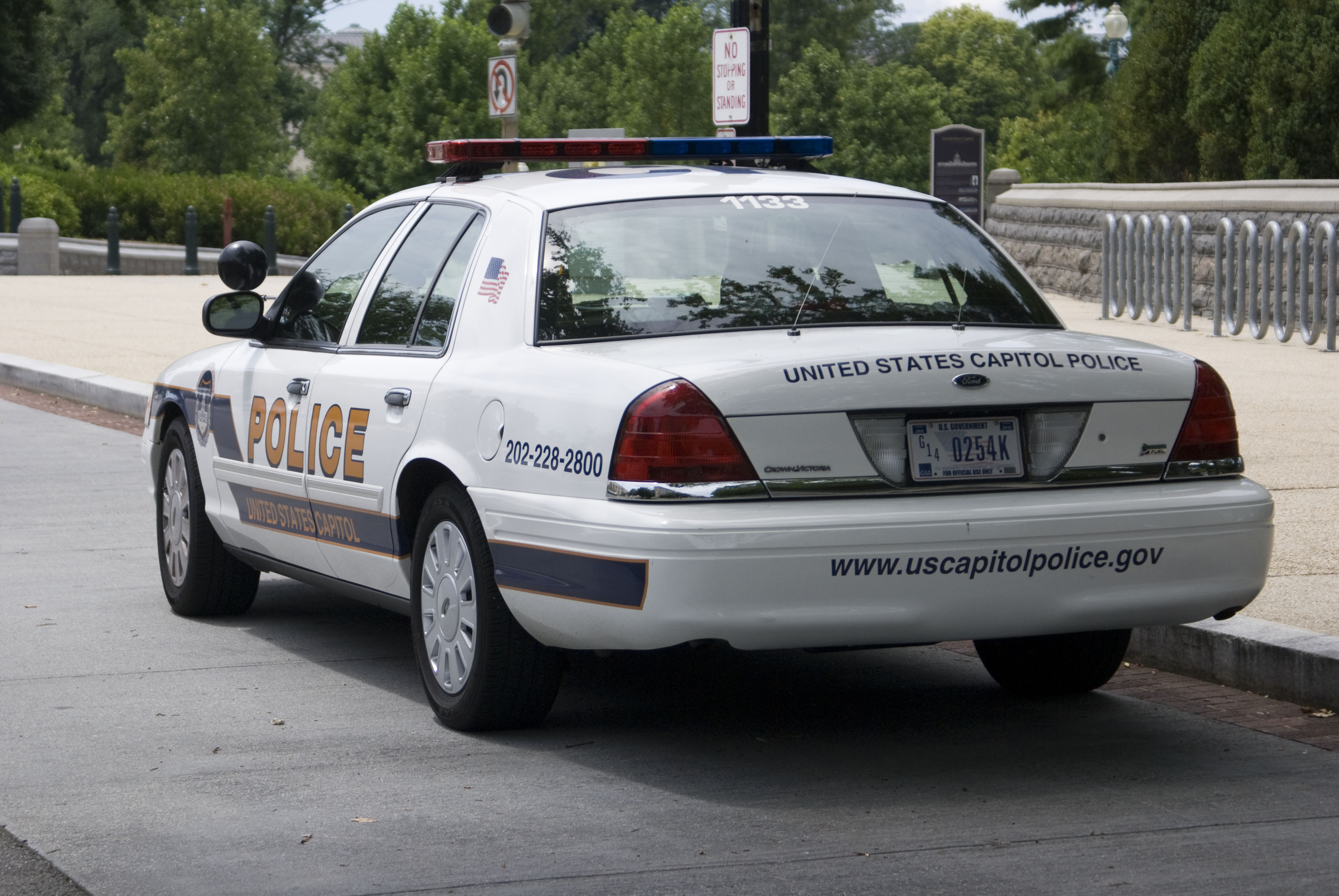
Rear view

=== 1998 ===
For the 1998 model year, the Ford Motor Company restyled the Crown Victoria, eliminating the "aero" look that the first-generation Crown Victoria had from 1992 to 1997, adopting the more conservative styling of the Mercury Grand Marquis. Both cars included restyled front and rear end components. The 1998 police package P71 had a chrome grille, chrome door handle trim, chrome bumper strips, and a chrome-trimmed flat-black rear fascia with the "Crown Victoria" badge.

=== 1999 ===
In 1999, Ford introduced the "Crown Victoria Police Interceptor" name, with a badge on the trunk lid replacing the 1998 "Crown Victoria" badge (Though very early 1999 models still retained the "Crown Victoria" badging). A chrome-trimmed gloss-black rear fascia, black door-handle trim, black bumper strips, and a gloss-black slatted grille were also introduced at this time. Finally, the new Street Appearance Package (SAP), intended to make the CVPI look like a standard (P73) model, including chrome trimming and Crown Victoria badging, was introduced.

Midway through 1999, the taillights were also changed; 1998 and early 1999 models had a separate amber turn signal along the bottom edge of each taillight housing. Starting in mid-1999, the extra bulbs were eliminated and the turn signals returned to the combination of stop/turn setup with red lenses found in many North American cars. Although the lenses changed, the housings did not. They still had the chambers for the separate turn signals that early models had.

These chambers were now empty, leaving a perfect place to install in police cars strobe tubes that would not affect brake or turn-signal visibility. Fleet models equipped with the "Street Appearance Package" retained the amber turn signal until 2004, when all CVs changed to all-red taillights.

For 1999, a heavy duty 11.25" torque converter became standard equipment on all CVPIs. In comparison, the civilian Crown Victoria uses a 12" torque converter.

=== 2000 ===
For 2000, the rear fascia and taillights lost the chrome trim, and the gloss-black grille was dropped in favor of a flat-black slatted grille. The black painted mirror caps were now textured plastic, and the ECM received less aggressive calibration as Ford deemed 1999 P71 models as being too aggressively calibrated.

=== 2001 ===
Further alterations were made in 2001, but most importantly, the CVPI now received the "Performance Improved" 4.6L 2V V8 engine as standard equipment. It made 235 hp at 4,750 rpm and 276 lb-ft of torque at 4,000 rpm. In a corresponding move, the ECM was once again re-calibrated and the P71 sported a more powerful 135/82 amp alternator. The 3.55:1 rear differential was also deleted in favor of a 3.27:1 unit.

All plastic bumper trim was deleted and a new honeycomb-style grille was made standard, replacing the slat-style grille. Street Appearance Package versions still maintained their chrome bumper trim and chrome slat style grille. Power adjustable pedals also became an option for 2001, as height diversity among officers joining police departments increased. Ford relocated the rear window defrost switch from the left side of the dash to the direct left of the HVAC controls. The Ford logo on the steering wheel was now blue instead of being color coded to the interior.

=== 2002 ===
There were no changes made to the 2002 CVPI aside from the addition of power mirrors as standard equipment.

=== 2003 (re-engineering) ===
At the 2002 New York International Auto Show, a 2003 Ford Police Interceptor concept car was previewed featuring an all new exterior, mirror-mounted spotlights, a 300 hp V8 engine, reinforced front and rear bumpers made out of a mixture of stainless steel, polymer, and aluminum, as well as 18-inch alloy wheels.

By May 2003, the Crown Victoria Police Interceptor accounted for approximately 85% of the police cars in use in the United States.

While the exterior design of the 2003 concept vehicle was scrapped, the 2003 model year brought the most extensive changes to the Panther platform since its 1979 introduction. The 2003 model year introduced all new underpinnings with a re-designed and fully boxed hydro-formed steel frame, as well as an aluminum #2 cross-member. According to Ford, the new frame was 20% more resistant to vertical bending and allowed the vehicle to perform better in crashes. For more precise handling, the suspension was significantly revamped, with the addition of coil over front shocks, revised steering knuckles, revised upper and lower control arms, and mono tube rear shocks; the new rear shocks were now inverted and mounted to the outside of the frame rails. For more precise steering, the recirculating ball power steering system was replaced with an all new rack and pinion unit that was 22.5 pounds lighter than the outgoing setup. The brakes were also redesigned, with the addition of a quiet EBD brake booster that optimized front-rear brake bias; it also featured a mechanical panic assist. These changes contributed to 2003 and newer CVPIs having significantly better handling characteristics in comparison to their 2002 and older counterparts.

Several changes were also made under the hood. An engine knock sensor and revised engine tuning increased horsepower and torque ratings for the 2003 CVPI to 239 hp and 287 lb-ft of torque. Additionally, the entire exhaust system was re-designed, with exhaust hangers now mounted to the frame rails; this allowed for a reduction in interior noise. For improved carbon emissions, the EGR system was revamped, and the fuel system was now return-less. A larger 6-quart oil pan was also made standard, and the oil fill cap was moved to the passenger side valve cover. The intake manifold was revised and now included an aluminum coolant crossover and deeper intake runners. For better cooling, a new, variable speed electric cooling fan replaced the two-speed unit, and the power steering fluid reservoir was now mounted to the fan shroud. In a minor change, an accessory belt shield was fitted to the front of the engine, and a new engine cover that featured a silver "V8" emblem was introduced. Lastly, a larger 78 amp hour battery was now standard on the CVPI.

The interior was also slightly revised for 2003, with new front seating surfaces that featured improved cloth upholstery and larger headrests; seat-mounted side airbags also became an option. The standard vinyl rear bench and optional cloth rear bench also received new upholstery. Additionally, interior door panels and switch gear were also updated for better ergonomics.

Another notable change for 2003 was the addition of 7-hole 16x8 inch steel wheels, replacing the old concave 20-hole steel wheels. A 2003 model can be told apart from its 1998–2002 counterpart models by simply examining the wheels. Due to the new underpinnings, the wheels for the new cars had a much higher offset and look almost flat. Along with a new wheel design, new hubcaps were introduced. These new 7-hole steel wheels were eventually the subject of a recall.

==== 2003 Mid-year De-contenting ====
Midway through the 2003 model year, Ford de-contented the CVPI along with the rest of the Panther platform line. The CVPI saw the removal of the remote locking fuel door, auto parking brake pedal release, foam insulators inside the headliner, silver "V8" emblem on the engine cover, and an engine compartment lamp. Ford estimated that de-contenting the Panther platform lineup would save US$4,000,000 in production costs per year. These changes took effect in December 2002, and vehicles produced after this date are often referred to as "2003.5" and "2003 Job #2" models.

=== 2004 ===
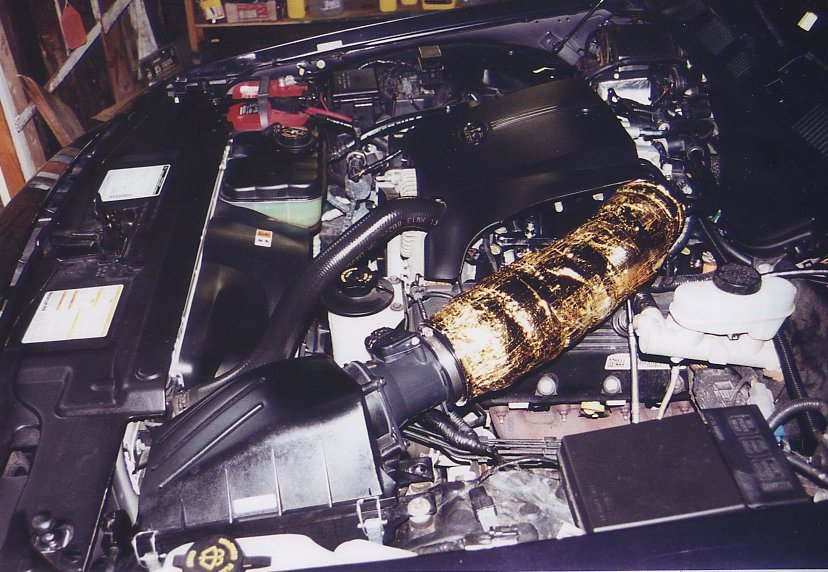
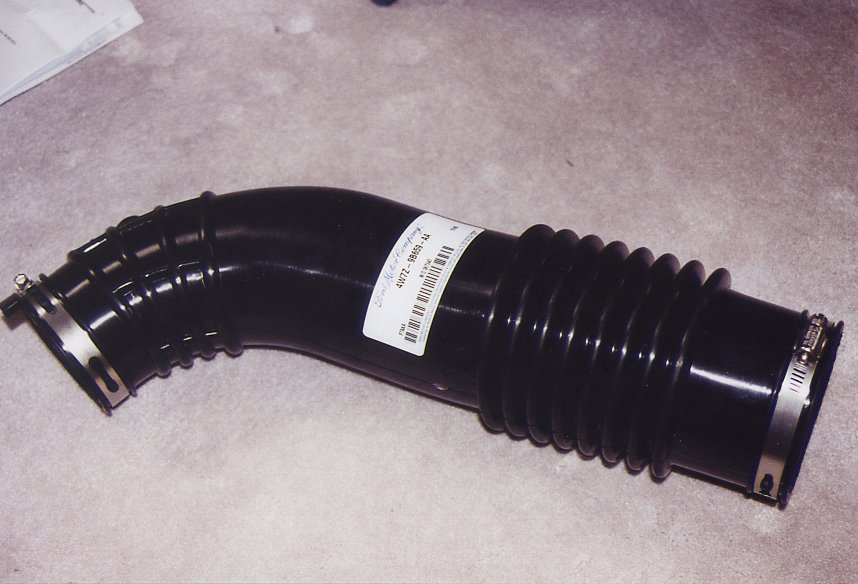
CVPI/Mercury Marauder air intake assembly

For 2004, the CVPI received its final horsepower upgrade, using a new air intake borrowed from the Mercury Marauder. The 2004–2011 CVPI is rated for 186.8 kW (254 PS; 250.5 hp) at 4,900 rpm. This better-flowing air intake system also has an integrated 80 mm (3.1 in) mass airflow (MAF) sensor that is part of the airbox lid (but can be serviced individually). This allows for much more precise flow calibration and reduces the chances of air leakage. The P71 zip tube (the flexible rubber hose between the throttle body and MAF outlet) is also used to reduce NVH (noise, vibration, and harshness) as well as transfer air from the airbox to the throttle body with minimal flow resistance. The 2004 CVPI also included a 200 amp heavy-duty alternator manufactured by Mitsubishi. The new alternator was computer controlled and featured a one-way decoupling pulley in order to remedy belt slippage on wide open throttle up shifts. The alternator has a characteristic whine under hard acceleration that can be mistaken for a mechanical issue.

The 3.55:1 rear axle returned as an option for 2004, and in a cost-cutting move, the standard heated mirrors were made optional, and the silver bumper trim found on Street Appearance Package models was removed.

=== 2005 ===
2005 introduced an optional fire suppression system, an industry first. It was touted to decrease the chances of a fire from starting in rear impact collisions. Vehicles equipped with a fire suppression system can be easily identified by a large encased button mounted on the headliner forward of the map lights. A new steering wheel was introduced for 2005, and the AM/FM radio antenna was removed from the rear window and moved to the rear quarter panel (only for the 2005 MY). The throttle body is no longer manually operated by a cable, but by an electronic drive-by-wire set up. This move also corresponded with the addition of a slightly updated, electronically controlled 4R70E transmission, which was only used for the 2005 model year. A heated PCV valve was made standard, as were front crash severity sensors with a weight sensing passenger airbag function. Midway through the model year, a 31-spline rear axle was introduced as standard equipment. A trunk circulation fan was offered as a factory option.

=== 2006 ===
2006 introduced a redesigned instrument cluster with an analog speedometer, tachometer, digital odometer with hour meter and trip meter features, and cross-compatibility with the civilian version's various features (these are normally locked out, but can be accessed through wiring modification). Kevlar-lined front doors were made optional on the CVPIs for the 2006 model year. Introduced in 2006 for P70/P72 Commercial Heavy Duty models and P71 Police Interceptor models was a standard 17-in steel wheel, replacing the previous 16-in wheels, plus new flat-gray wheel covers rather than chromed wheel covers as in previous years. Flex Fuel was made available as an option.

Mechanically, an updated and electronically controlled 4R75E transmission was introduced with better off the line performance than previous versions.

=== 2007 ===
No changes were introduced for the 2007 model year, aside from the rear shocks having returned to a right-side up design.

=== 2008 ===
For 2008, the Crown Victoria was restricted to fleet-only sales, and all Panther platform vehicles became Flex Fuel cars, making them compatible with E85 fuel. The CVPI also received keyless entry abilities.

=== 2009 ===
For the 2009 model year, the CVPI now had power pedals, side airbags, and federally mandated recessed window switches as standard equipment. The CVPI also received upgraded brakes for 2009, although specifics about them are not available. The confirmation flash that occurs when the doors are locked is now automatically disabled when the Courtesy Lamp Disable option is ordered. The confirmation flash was considered to be a safety issue because the lights would flash when officers exited the vehicle and locked the doors, potentially giving their presence away at night.

The car received new styled door moldings, and Ford placed a "Flex Fuel" badge in the lower right corner of the rear fascia. The Street Appearance Package also received the same new door moldings as found on the civilian-fleet-only Crown Victoria LX.

The 2009 CVPI now mandated the use of Mercon LV fluid in the 4R75E transmission.

=== 2010 ===
In 2010, the VIN code "P71" was replaced with "P7B". No other changes were made.

=== 2011 ===
2011 models received updated and larger front headrests along with the rest of the Crown Victoria line in order to comply with new front crash-rating standards. This was the last model year for the CVPI and no other changes were made from 2010. The final CVPI was purchased by the Kansas Highway Patrol in 2011.

As of 2023, the Los Angeles County Sheriff's Department has more than 400 CVPIs in service, having kept most of its last batch of 600 delivered in 2011 in stockpile.

== Comparison with standard Crown Victoria ==
Both cars use the same 4.6 L 2V SOHC V8 (both Flex Fuel starting in 2008), Ford modular engine, and Ford four-speed automatic transmission. However, a few notable differences exist between the CVPI and a standard Crown Victoria or Grand Marquis.

=== Engine and drive train ===
All CVPIs are equipped with a larger capacity radiator along with external power steering, transmission, and engine oil cooler to reduce engine oil temperatures. This allows the vehicles to operate at high rpm/high loads for an extended period of time without the risk of engine oil overheating and subsequent engine damage. The engine oil cooler can be prone to seeping oil from the O-ring seals after the high-mileage operation encountered by CVPIs, particularly where damaged by road salt.

The Police Interceptor engine calibration includes a slightly higher idle speed (by around 40 rpm) and minor changes in the emissions settings. The computer is tuned for more aggressive transmission shift points, and the transmission itself uses a smaller heavy-duty 11.25" (1999–2011) torque converter compared to the 12" torque converter on a standard Crown Victoria. The EGR system is controlled differently on '03 and older vehicles than on non-police vehicles.

The 2004–2011 Police Interceptors are equipped standard with an open 3.27:1 rear axle (axle code Z5), with a traction-lock (Trac-Lok) 3.27:1 rear axle (axle code X5) optional, and are electronically limited to 129 mph (208 km/h) due to critical drive-line speed limitations. An optional 3.55:1 traction-lock rear axle ratio with 119 mph speed limiter was also available from 2004 to 2011 (axle code C6). The 1999-mid 2001 CVPIs were equipped with a standard 3.55:1 rear axle ratio and were limited to about 124 mph (200 km/h). This compares to the standard non-P71 2.73 rear axle ratio with a speed limitation of 110 mph (177 km/h) for all "civilian" Crown Victorias.

Ford used an aluminum matrix composite driveshaft for the 1999–2001 CVPIs as a measure to allow safe operation at high speeds with the 3.55:1 gear ratio, but it was more expensive than the regular aluminum driveshafts and was eliminated with the 3.55:1 rear axle midway through the 2001 model year.

=== Horsepower/torque ratings ===
Years	Power	Torque	Notes
1998–2000	215 hp (160 kW)	285 lb⋅ft (386 N⋅m)	Non-performance improved (NPI).
2001–2002	235 hp (175 kW)	276 lb⋅ft (374 N⋅m)	"Performance Improved" 4.6L 2V V8.
2003	239 hp (178 kW)	287 lb⋅ft (389 N⋅m)	Addition of a knock sensor allowed the ECM to be re-calibrated for more power.
2004–2011	250 hp (186 kW)	297 lb⋅ft (403 N⋅m)	Mercury Marauder-style air intake, 80mm mass airflow sensor.

Ford CVPI 1/4 mile times (as tested by Michigan State Police).

Model	1/4 mile
1992 Ford Crown Victoria Police Interceptor	17.48
1993 Ford Crown Victoria Police Interceptor	17.29
1994 Ford Crown Victoria Police Interceptor	17.25
1995 Ford Crown Victoria Police Interceptor	17.32
1996 Ford Crown Victoria Police Interceptor	16.89
1997 Ford Crown Victoria Police Interceptor	17.63
2003 Ford Police Interceptor	16.99
2004 Ford Police Interceptor "3:55"	16.34
2004 Ford Police Interceptor "3:27"	16.44
2005 Ford Police Interceptor "3:27"	16.44
2006 Ford Police Interceptor "3:55"	16.57
2006 Ford Police Interceptor "3:27"	16.73
2007 Ford Police Interceptor "3:34"	16.70
2008 Ford Police Interceptor "3:55"	16.29
2008 Ford Police Interceptor "3:27"	16.35
2009 Ford Police Interceptor "3:55"	16.71
2009 Ford Police Interceptor "3:27"	16.69
2010 Ford Police Interceptor "3:55"	16.42
2010 Ford Police Interceptor "3:27"	16.74
2011 Ford Police Interceptor "3:55"	16.75
2011 Ford Police Interceptor "3:27"	16.82

=== Body and chassis ===
Another difference is Ford's "severe duty" shock absorbers that offer a stiffer ride than the standard Crown Victoria. They also have black steel wheels with stainless steel or chromed plastic hubcaps.

All CVPIs also come with T-409 stainless-steel, dual exhaust systems without resonators. Standard Crown Victorias come with a stainless-steel single exhaust system, while the Handling and Performance Package and LX Sport-equipped Crown Victorias have the same exhaust system as the CVPI, with the resonators. The resonators further reduce noise, vibration, and harshness without adding any restriction to the exhaust system. CVPIs have higher-rate coil springs, around 0.8 inches (20.3 mm) of additional ground clearance, and thinner rear anti-roll bars (shared with the LX Sport) than the Handling and Performance Package Crown Victorias; the base Crown Victoria, beginning in 2003.5, does not have a rear anti-roll bar.

The bulk of police car modifications, such as installation of emergency lights, sirens, passenger seat dividers, and plastic rear bench seats, are offered as aftermarket modifications by third parties.

=== Interior ===
CVPIs came standard with manual cloth bucket seats, despite having the shifter on the steering column. This gap between seats is generally filled by a console holding radios, controls for emergency equipment, large firearms, and often a laptop computer or mobile data terminal. A velour split-bench seat was optional, with a power-adjustable driver's seat being optional on both the split bench and standard bucket seats. All front bucket seats came with stab-proof seat backs. The rear seats were offered as a standard vinyl bench, however, both cloth and velour rear seats were optional. CVPIs came standard with heavy-duty flooring, but this could be removed in favor of carpeting. All CVPIs had a non-leather wrapped steering wheel, with cruise control being an available option throughout the model run. All CVPIs came standard with a basic four-preset AM/FM radio, however, there was the option to add either a cassette deck or CD player. The CVPI also had a calibrated 140 mph (225 km/h) speedometer. The trunk release button was located in the center of the dashboard as opposed to being on the driver door panel (some units were fitted with both of these). The CVPI was available with "dark mode", which disabled overhead interior lighting upon opening a door.

== Problems and criticism ==
=== Rear-end collision fires ===
Following the criticism of fires following highway-speed rear-end collisions, 2005 and later model CVPIs had an optional automatic fire suppression system and special "trunk packs" designed to prevent cargo from penetrating the fuel tank in a collision. Customers had to pay an additional $150 (equivalent to $247 in 2025) per car for the trunk packs.

=== Wheels ===
Some problems arose with early 2003 CVPIs; the newly designed steel wheels rusted prematurely, and the rack and pinion steering units failed as early as 10,000 miles. This was not limited to the CVPI; some 2004 Mercury Marauders were also affected. A recall, initiated on March 1, 2007 (07S48), affected the steel wheels used on 2003–2005 CVPIs. Another issue with the wheels have been weld points that come loose, causing rapid air loss in tires and the potential for loss of control. A recall was issued after an investigation by the National Highway Traffic Safety Administration. However, the company has created anger among civilian owners of 2003+ Police Interceptors by refusing to honor the recall unless the vehicle is still being used in fleet service. The only way this problem could be addressed was if a civilian customer complained to a dealership about air leakage problems, an inability to balance the wheels properly, or a "nibble" or excessive vibration in the steering at speed. The issue was then addressed through the "Customer Satisfaction Program" that Ford initiated for the wheels. Ford ultimately resolved this issue on production cars in 2006 by introducing new 17-in steel wheels for their heavy-duty models.

=== Intake manifold ===
A common failure point on the Crown Victoria Police Interceptor was the intake manifold. Beginning in 1996, Ford used a plastic intake manifold manufactured by DuPont, which also had an integral plastic thermostat housing and anti-freeze crossover. As these vehicles were commonly used for emergency style driving and often endured long idling times, these intake manifolds quickly proved to be problematic. Cracks would develop along the thermostat housing area, causing anti-freeze leaks and overheating issues. Misfires have also been reported, as leaking anti-freeze may seep down into the spark plug wells. This resulted in a class action lawsuit against Ford. Beginning in 2003, a revised intake manifold with a bolt-on aluminum thermostat housing and anti-freeze crossover was produced and fitted to all new vehicles in an attempt to remedy the issue. While they were less failure prone, these intake manifolds proved to be problematic as well. Another common failure point on these intake manifolds was the rear heater hose fitting, located on the rear right side of the engine. It used a plastic nipple to connect the heater hose to the heater core. The plastic nipple would often split off from the intake manifold, causing rapid anti-freeze loss and overheating.

=== Steering shaft recall ===
In 2013, Ford Motor Company recalled 370,000 2005–2011 model year Ford Crown Victoria, Mercury Grand Marquis, and Lincoln Town Car vehicles due to the possibility of steering loss. The recall only applied to vehicles sold in Connecticut, Delaware, Illinois, Indiana, Iowa, Kentucky, Maine, Maryland, Massachusetts, Michigan, Minnesota, Missouri, New Hampshire, New Jersey, New York, Ohio, Pennsylvania, Rhode Island, Vermont, Virginia, West Virginia, Wisconsin, and the District of Columbia. 15,000 of the affected vehicles were sold in Canada.

== Discontinuation ==
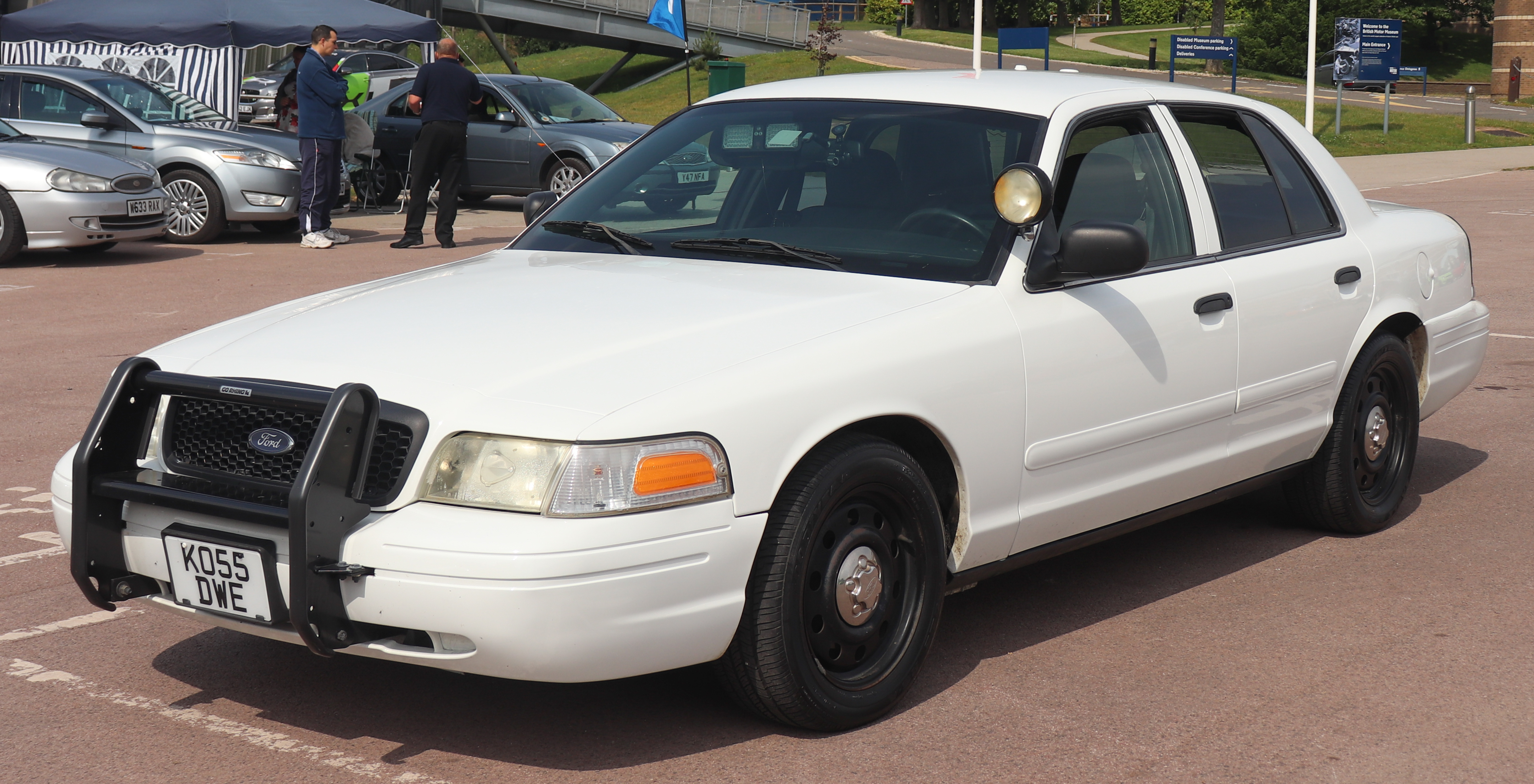
Following the discontinuation of the CVPI, many surplus and decommissioned examples have been sold on to civilian owners; this 2006 example was exported to the United Kingdom following its decommissioning.

In April 2011, Ford stopped accepting orders for the CVPI. Following the 2011 model year, due to its lack of electronic stability control, the Crown Victoria was no longer legal for sale in the United States and Canada; a short 2012 model year was produced solely for GCC/Middle East export. The last Crown Victoria Police Interceptor rolled off the assembly line in August 2011 and was sold to the Kansas Highway Patrol as part of a batch of 14 CVPIs. The vehicle now resides in the agency's academy as a museum piece. This was followed by the final Crown Victoria to ever be produced on September 15, 2011, which was exported to Saudi Arabia. It was the very last vehicle to be produced at the St. Thomas Assembly Plant before its closure.

As CVPIs continue to be decommissioned across the United States, a significant number have gone on to be purchased by civilian owners. Some have also been preserved in museums in the United States and overseas.

=== Successor ===
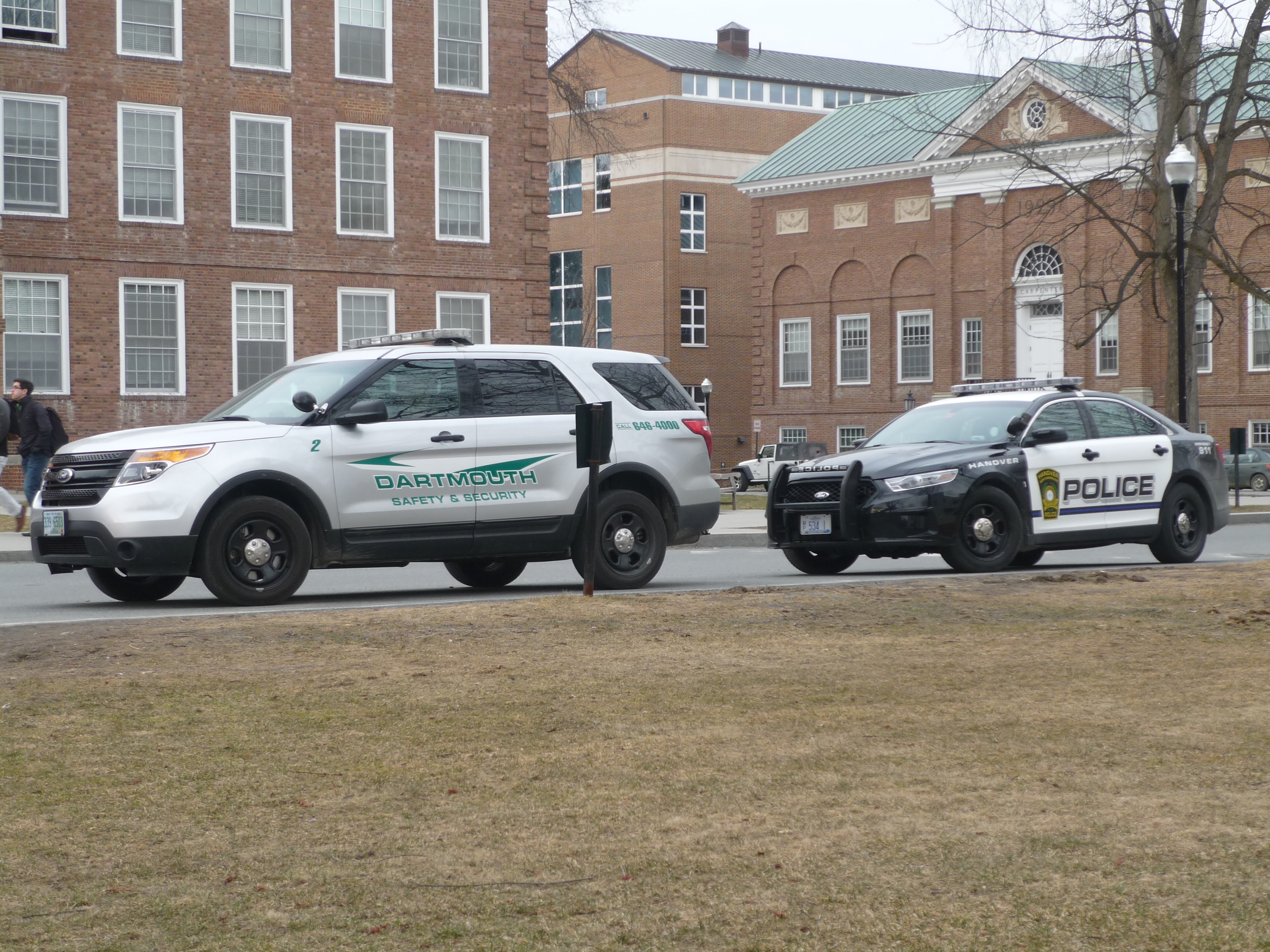
The Ford Police Interceptor Utility and Ford Police Interceptor Sedan, the successors to the CVPI

On March 12, 2010, Ford Motor Company unveiled the Ford Police Interceptor Sedan. While sharing a nameplate with the Crown Victoria Police Interceptor, the Police Interceptor Sedan was a variant of the sixth-generation Ford Taurus, shifting from the long-running Panther chassis to an all-wheel drive version of the D3 architecture.

In a design decision, the Police Interceptor Sedan did not adopt the Taurus nameplate, as it was sold alongside the Ford Police Interceptor Utility, derived from the Ford Explorer. Along with heavier-duty components and a redesigned interior, the Police Interceptor Sedan adopted higher-performance steering and suspension tuning. The standard engine was a 3.5 L V6, but a 3.7 L V6 (shared with the Mustang) later became the standard power plant. A twin-turbocharged EcoBoost V6 (shared with the Taurus SHO) was also available as an option.

The Ford Police Interceptor Sedan was discontinued alongside the North American Ford Taurus model on March 1, 2019. The Ford Police Interceptor Utility remained in production as Ford's main police vehicle, sharing its design with the civilian market Ford Explorer.

== Use outside North America ==
=== Europe ===
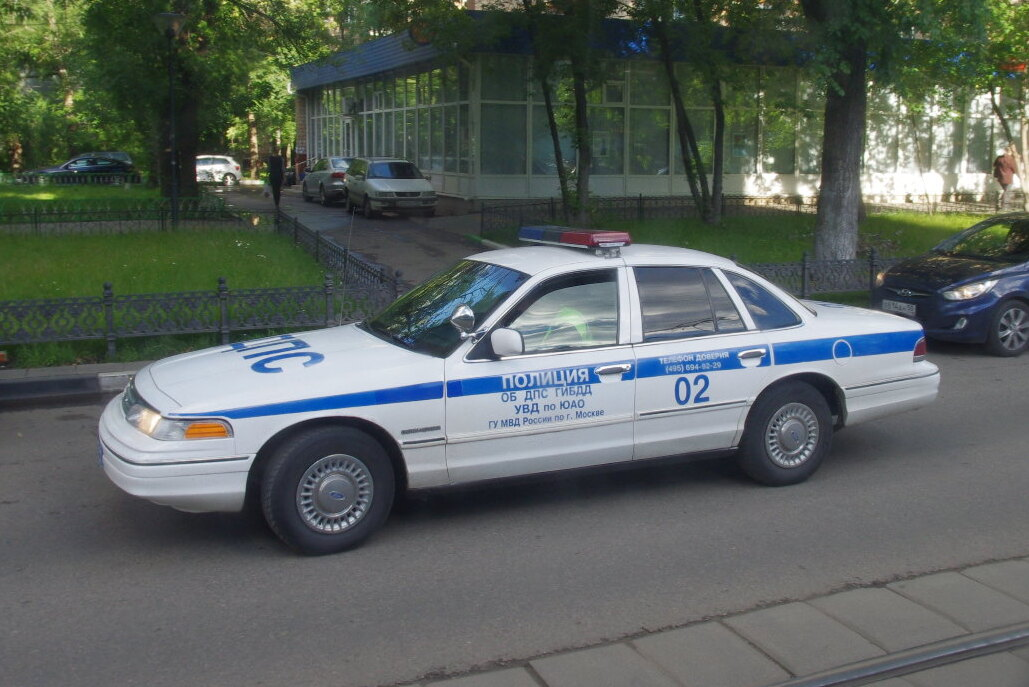
A first-generation CVPI used by the Moscow City Police in 2014

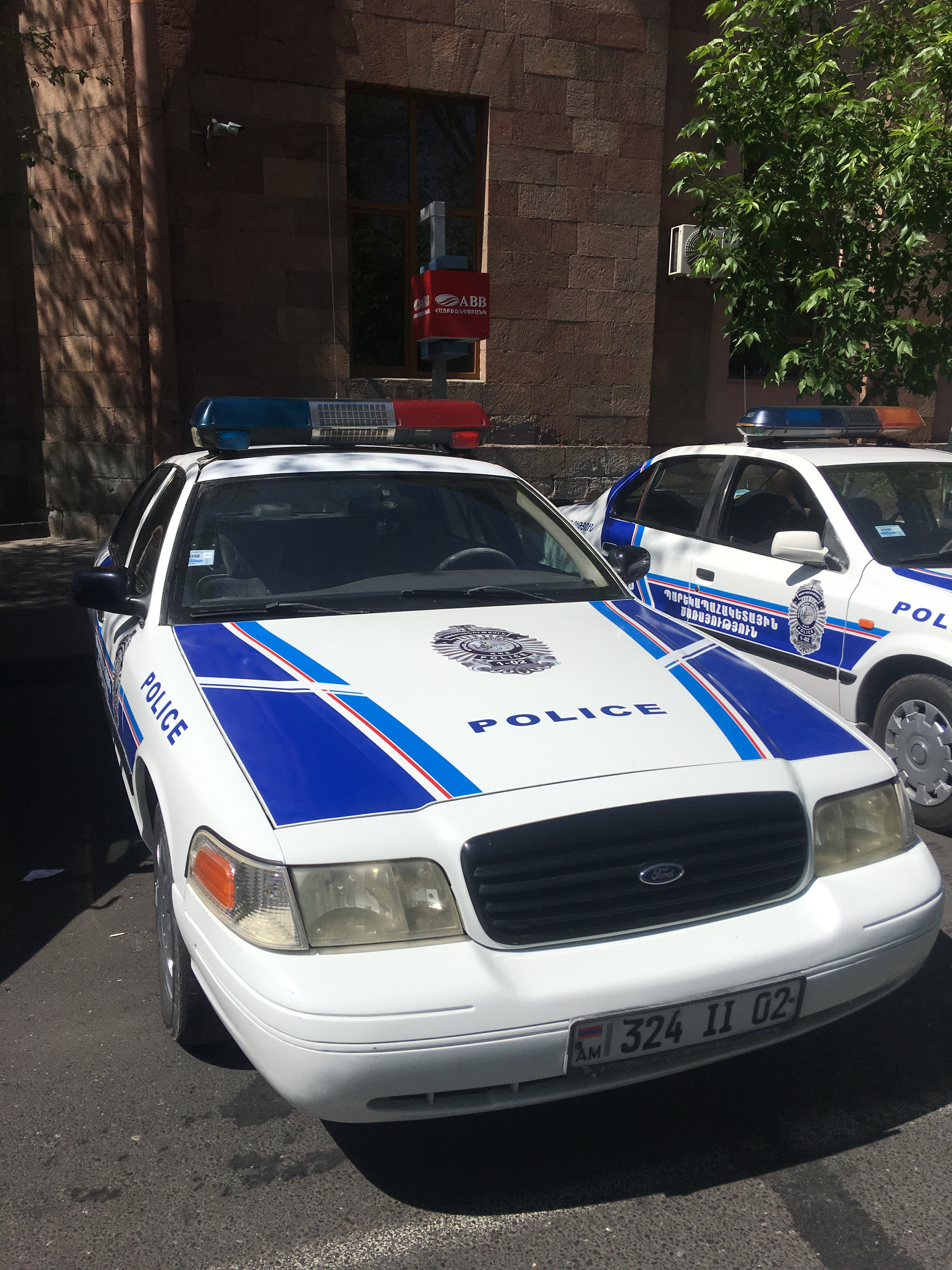
A second-generation CVPI used by the Police of Armenia in 2018

In Russia, the Main Directorate for Road Traffic Safety, popularly known under its historical abbreviation GAI (ГАИ), purchased 140 Crown Victoria P71s between 1993 and 1995 through an economic aid package signed off by President Bill Clinton. The vehicles were operated by the Road Patrol Service (DPS), part of the militsiya (now politisya), and were used as highway patrol units around the greater Moscow area, replacing Chaika-engined GAZ-24-10 Volgas which could not keep up with foreign imported cars. Used by the DPS through the early 2010s, the Crown Victoria's reliability and comfortable seats were well-liked by officers. Second-generation CVPIs were reported to be used in other regional police forces such as in Sochi.

In 1999, the Ukrainian Militsiya in Chernihiv were provided first-generation Crown Victoria as humanitarian aid from Washington, D.C. According to official documents provided by the Militsiya, the vehicles were not widely used since June 2011. These vehicles were used by the local State Traffic Inspectorate. There was documentation submitted in 2014 regarding the potential write-off for the first-gen CVs in Cherihiv. There have also been sightings of CVPIs used by the Ukrainian Military Police.

In 2003, three CVPIs were bought by the French city of Montpellier at a cost of €120,000 (equivalent to €182,000 in 2023) to the taxpayer. Purchased as part of an upgrade of the local Police Municipale, the Crown Victorias were selected for their durability, security, and safety. In 2008, they were put up for sale, as the cars were found to be too wide for the city streets and too long for PM garages.

Belarus purchased first-generation Crown Victorias and Tauruses in the 1990s for the Belarusian Militisya. Most were later replaced with second-generation CVPIs. In 2017, it was reported from Belarus that at least one of their 2003 Ford CVPIs formerly used by the Militsiya were being sold under $USD3,994 (equivalent to $5,246 in 2025) through the Belarusian Ministry of Internal Affairs. They were formerly used by the Brest Regional Executive Committee.

The Police of Armenia also used 10 Crown Victorias in the Yerevan metropolitan area; they were in use as late as 2020.

=== Middle East ===
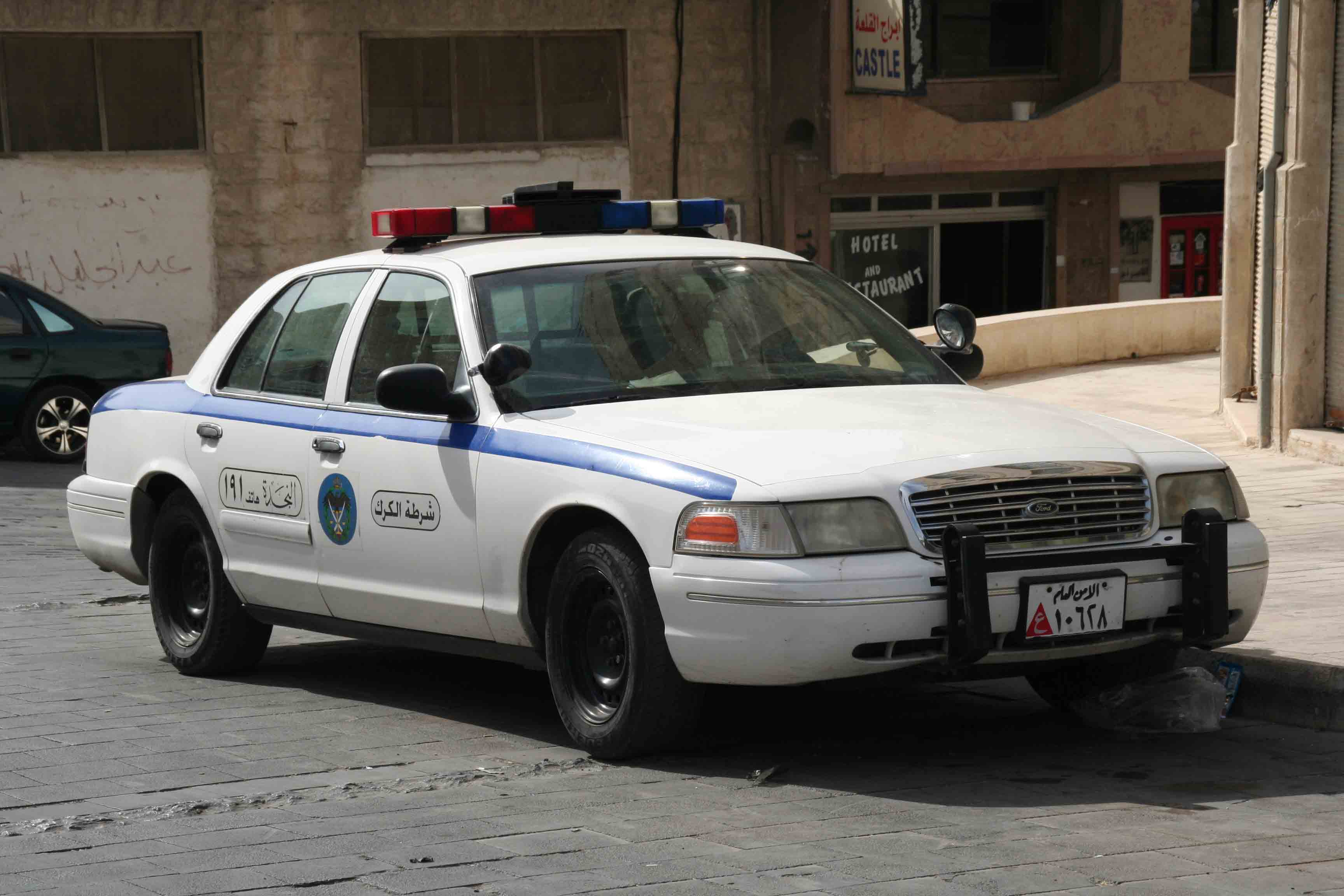
A CVPI in Al-Karak, Jordan

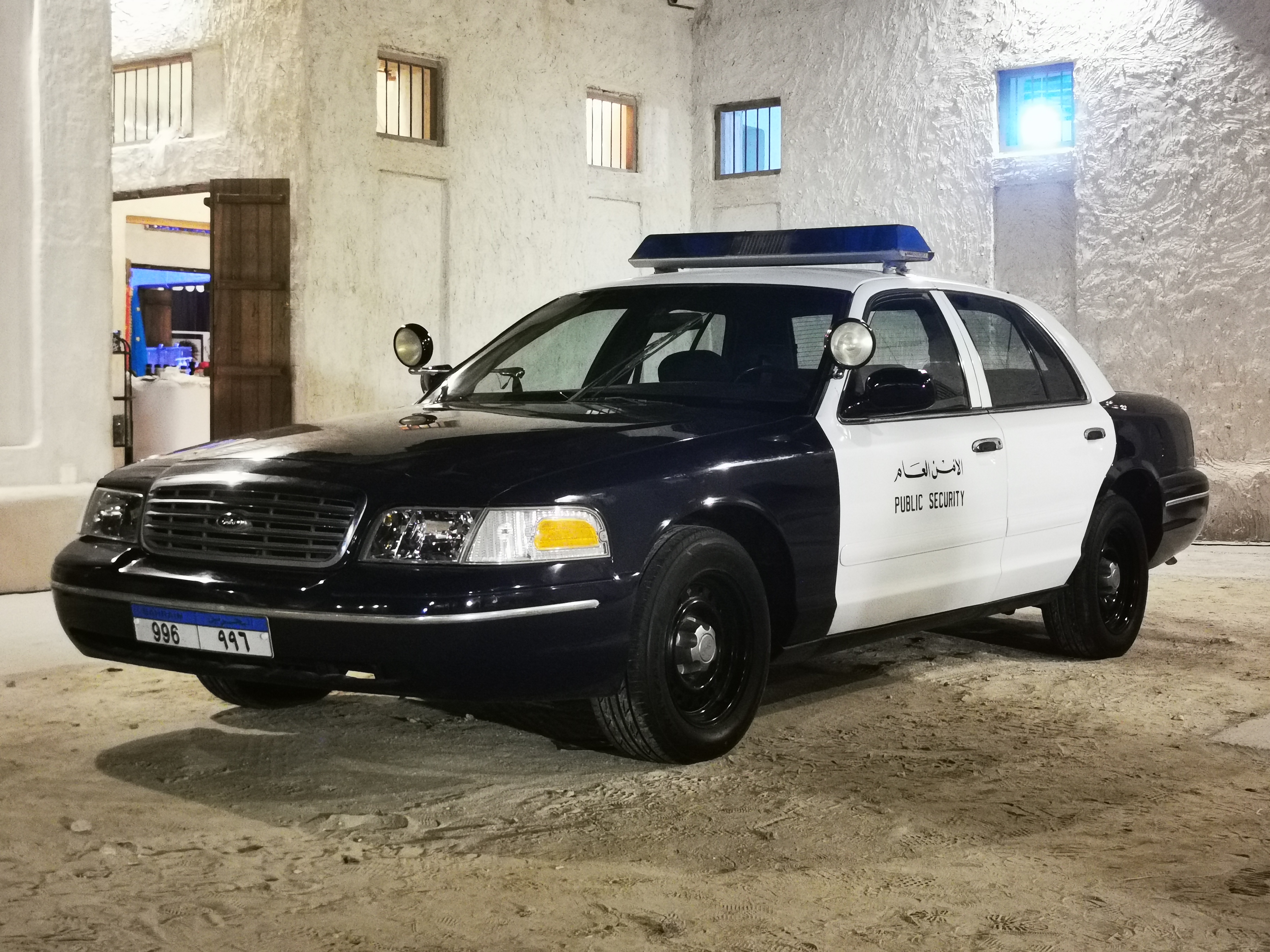
A 1998 Crown Victoria Police Interceptor on display in Askar, Bahrain

CVPIs were used by Middle Eastern law enforcement agencies, including those from the United Arab Emirates (via Dubai), Saudi Arabia, Kuwait, Bahrain, Oman and Jordan.

=== Caribbean ===
A fleet of five CVPIs were supplied to the Royal Bahamas Police Force in 2010 for use on Grand Bahama Island, joining older models in the force's fleet.

== In popular culture ==
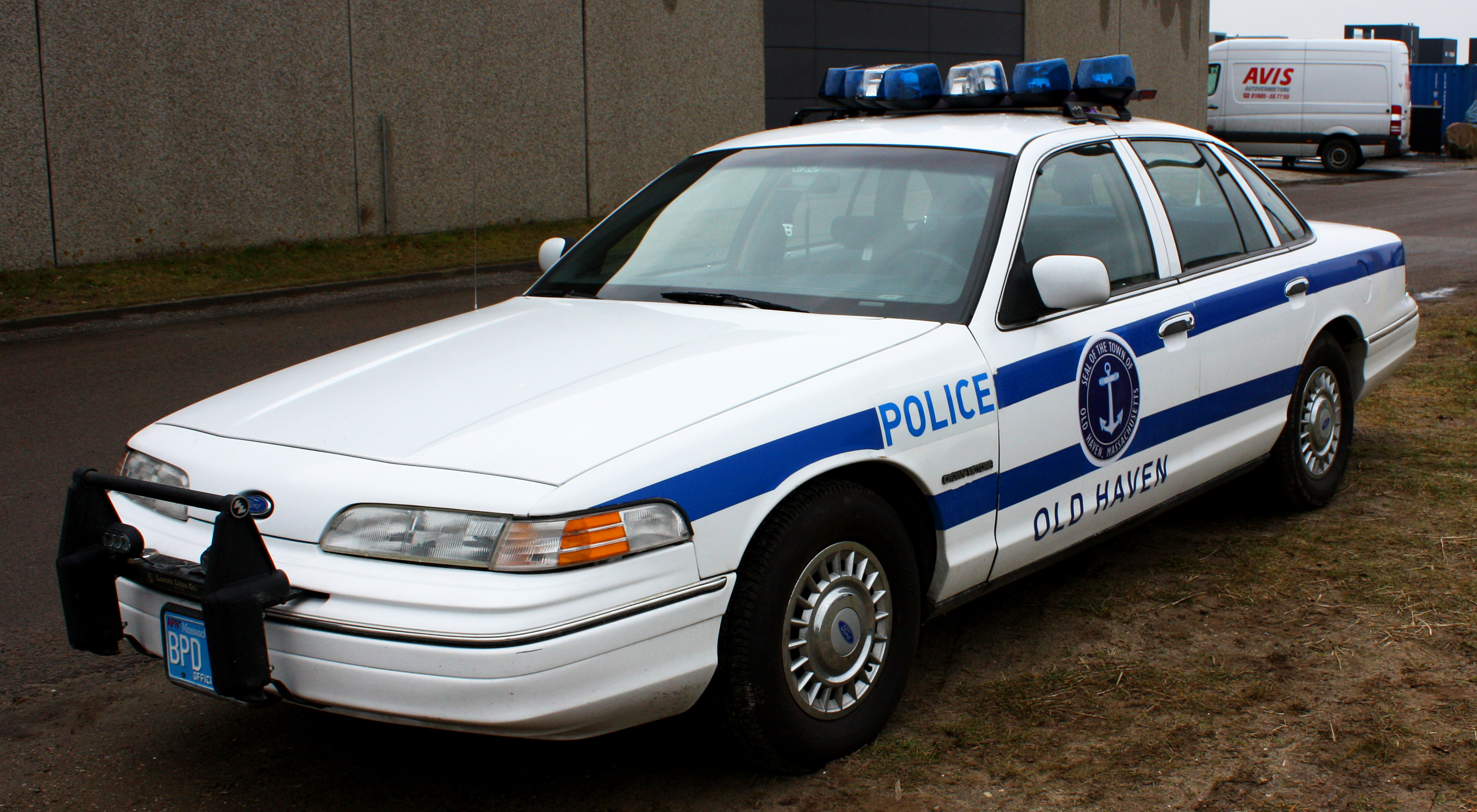
A 1992 CVPI formerly of the USAF Security Police, used as a prop car in the filming of The Ghost Writer in Germany.

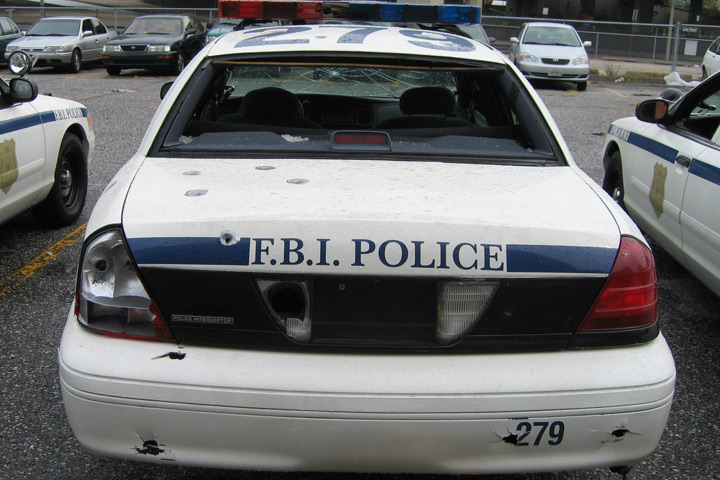
A second-generation CVPI used as a prop car in the filming of Live Free or Die Hard

As the Crown Victoria became increasingly ubiquitous within North America as a police vehicle, media from the 1990s through the 2010s followed suit and as a result the Crown Victoria and fictional vehicles resembling it became a common set-piece in television, cinema, and video games set in North America. Including civilian variants, both the Aero and 1998-2011 Ford Crown Victoria hold the world record for the car model with the largest number of appearances on screen.

In Russia, the mid-1990s Crown Victoria became a symbol of Moscow's road militsiya for over a decade; the P71 is pictured on a DPS badge awarded for 15 years of service. The cars were featured in several movies and in a 1997-1998 TV show Perehvat (The Intercept), where they tried to intercept target automobiles on Moscow streets.

The 2019 film Crown Vic is named after the CVPI, and follows two LAPD officers pursuing a team of bank robbers; both use Ford Crown Victorias.

A documentary film titled Crown Vic: America's Most Iconic Car by filmmaker Dale Roossien was scheduled to be released in fall 2023. It is a full-length film documenting the Crown Victoria and its sister cars. It follows the legacy of the vehicle through its inception to its current cult-like following, focusing on the individuals who still drive the car today. It was released as Panther People on Amazon Prime and Apple TV. As of 2026, the documentary is hosted on YouTube.

In 2026, series 7, episode 4 of "The Grand Tour" on Amazon Prime concluded that the Ford Crown Victoria Police Interceptor was the most durable car ever made.
