= Lockheed interceptor =

Lockheed interceptor may refer to:

- Lockheed P-38 Lightning,
- Lockheed YF-12, a prototype interceptor aircraft.
