= Ford Taurus (sixth generation) =

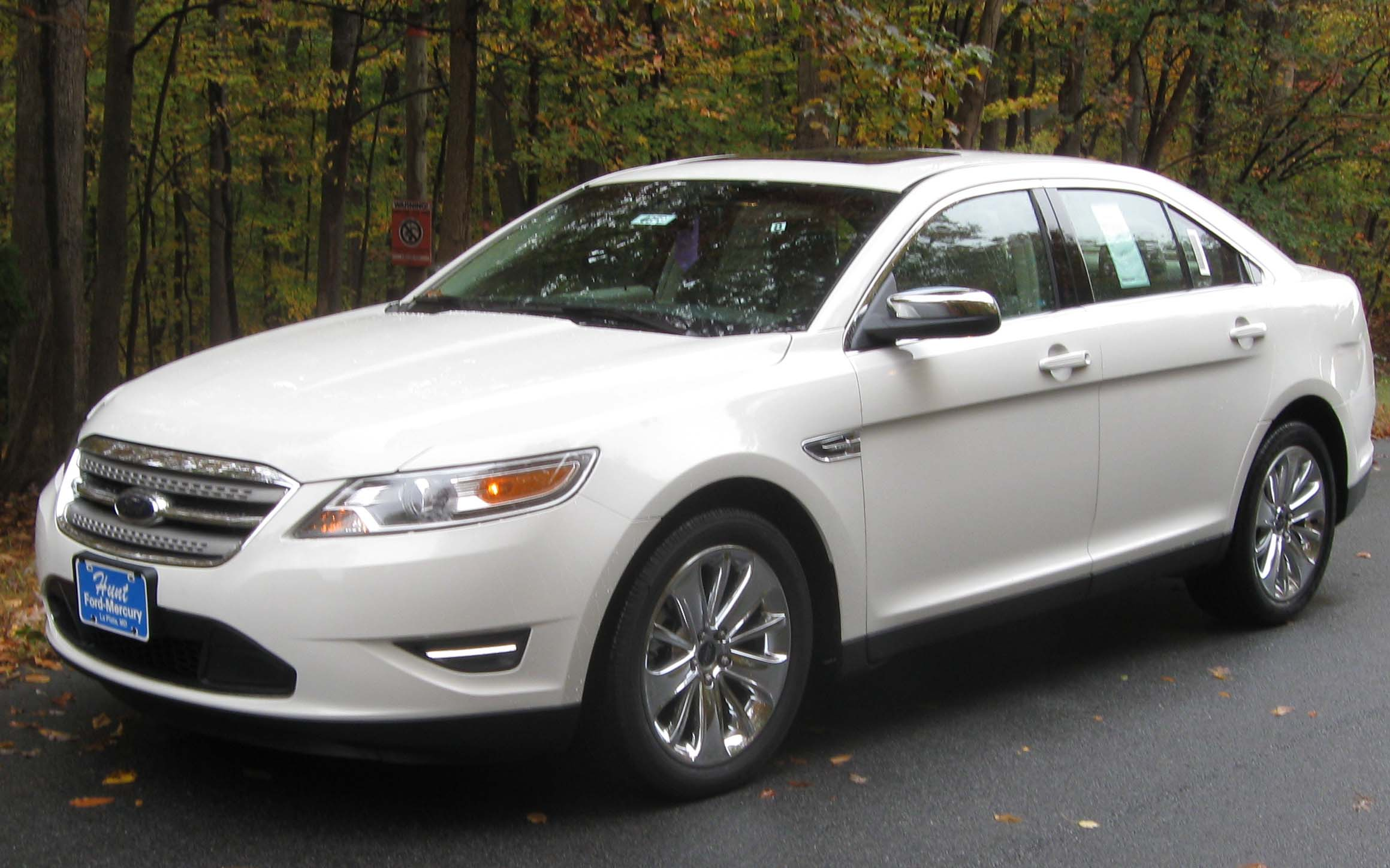
- 2010 Ford Taurus Limited

Overview
- Manufacturer: Ford
- Also called: Ford Police Interceptor Sedan (2013–2019, VIN number variant P2M); Ford Special Service Police Sedan
- Production: June 2009 – March 2019
- Model years: 2010–2019
- Assembly: Chicago, Illinois, U.S. (Chicago Assembly Plant)
- Designer: Earl Lucas (2007)

Body and chassis
- Class: Full-size
- Body style: 4-door sedan
- Layout: FF layout / F4 layout
- Platform: Ford D3 platform
- Related: Lincoln MKS; Ford Taurus SHO; Ford Police Interceptor Sedan

Powertrain
- Engine: 2.0 L EcoBoost turbo I4; 3.5 L Cyclone V6; 3.5 L EcoBoost turbo V6; 3.7 L Cyclone Ti-VCT FFV V6
- Transmission: 6F35 6-speed automatic (2.0T); 6F50 6-speed automatic (3.5L); 6F55 6-speed SelectShift® automatic (3.5TT); 6F55 6-speed SelectShift® automatic (3.7L FFV)

Dimensions
- Wheelbase: 112.9 in (2,868 mm)
- Length: 202.9 in (5,154 mm)
- Width: 76.2 in (1,935 mm)
- Height: 60.7 in (1,542 mm)
- Curb weight: 4,015 lb (1,821 kg)

Chronology
- Predecessor: Ford Taurus (fifth generation); Ford Crown Victoria
- Successor: Ford Taurus (China) (China and Middle East)

The sixth generation Ford Taurus is a full-size sedan manufactured and marketed by Ford for the 2010 to 2019 model years with a mild facelift for 2013. While sharing the chassis underpinnings of the previous generation Taurus and the Five Hundred, the exterior and interior of the sixth generation received a complete redesign, replacing New Edge design language with Ford's Kinetic Design design language. The high-performance Ford Taurus SHO made its return, becoming the first turbocharged Taurus. Following the discontinuation of the long-running Crown Victoria Police Interceptor after 2011, Ford introduced a Taurus-based Police Interceptor Sedan for 2013.

The sixth generation became the first version of the Taurus developed without a Mercury Sable counterpart, as Mercury began to pare down its model line. Though never branded as an official successor to the Mercury Grand Marquis, the sixth-generation Taurus superseded it as Ford matched it against the full-size competitors of its predecessors. Ford's Lincoln brand marketed the MKS as a variant of the Taurus, succeeding both the Continental and the Town Car. The Taurus X wagon was replaced by the Ford Flex, adopting a variant of the chassis architecture, also adopted by the Ford Explorer).

As Ford moved its model line away from car-based vehicles to utility-type vehicles and other light trucks at the end of the 2010s, Ford discontinued the Taurus in North America after the 2019 model year, as well its Fiesta, Focus, and Fusion models. The Taurus nameplate remains in use by Changan Ford, marketing a rebranded Ford Mondeo for the Middle East (replacing a namesake model).

Ford assembled the Taurus, Taurus SHO, and the Police Interceptor Sedan alongside the Ford Explorer and Lincoln MKS at its Chicago Assembly facility (Chicago, Illinois). On March 1, 2019, the last Ford Taurus was manufactured in the United States, ending its 34-year American production.

== Development and marketing ==
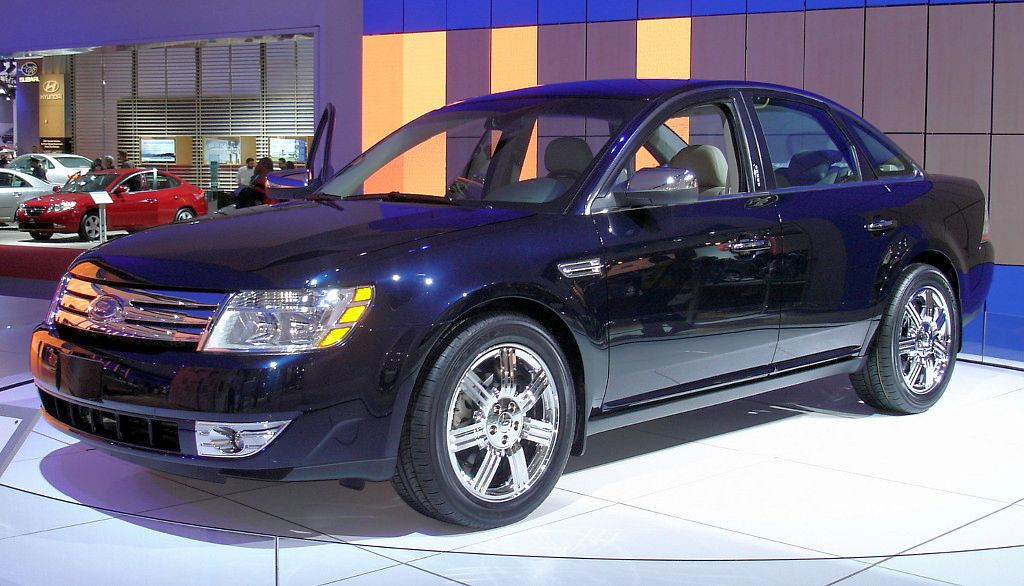
Pre-production 2008 Ford Five Hundred (on display at 2007 Detroit Auto Show), shown before renaming to 2008 Ford Taurus

In late 2006, Ford Motor Company named former Boeing CEO Alan Mulally to replace William Clay Ford Jr. as its own chief executive. In strong favor of the Ford Taurus/Mercury Sable nameplates, Mulally hurriedly renamed the facelifted MY 2008 Ford Five Hundred and Mercury Montego as the fifth-generation Ford Taurus and Mercury Sable — after the models had been presented at the 2008 Detroit Auto Show. The Ford Freestyle was renamed the Ford Taurus X.

Despite the mid-cycle facelift of the Five Hundred for MY 2008, simultaneous with its rebranding as the Taurus and a gained 60 hp increase, the styling of its predecessor largely remained and its handling trailed its competitors.

In January 2008, Alan Mulally said a sixth generation of the Ford Taurus was in development as a planned 2010 model, calling it "the one we should have built originally". In April 2008, a photograph of a full-scale prototype mockup of the 2010 Ford Taurus was leaked on the Internet. After the styling of the prototype was seen worldwide, Ford contemplated legal action against web sites which posted the photo and Ford attorneys asked site owners to remove the photo.

Towards its launch, the Ford website introduced several videos, benchmarking the 2010 Ford Taurus against several production luxury sedans. One test video suggested the paint coat of the Taurus was more resistant to gravel chips than a Lexus LS460 while another highlighted the blind-spot detection sensor system unavailable on an Infiniti M45x. The 2010 Ford Taurus SHO was faster than an Audi A6 4.2 FSI Quattro in straight-line acceleration while the interior of the Ford Taurus was quieter than an Acura RL.

In a major contrast from previous generations of the Ford Taurus, once the highest-selling nameplate in the United States, Ford deliberately aimed for lower sales. Instead of the 1990s peak volumes of nearly 400,000 vehicles a year, sales were projected closer to 50,000 to 75,000. As a full-size car, the Taurus competed closer to the Toyota Avalon and Nissan Maxima than the Toyota Camry, Honda Accord, and Nissan Altima (competitors of the Ford Fusion). Additionally, Ford sought to preserve the resale value of the Taurus by avoiding fleet sales, though the Taurus would replace the Crown Victoria as the Ford Police Interceptor sedan.

=== Release ===
The 2010 Ford Taurus was presented at the 2009 North American International Auto Show at Cobo Hall. In May 2009, Ford presented the new Taurus at three dealers in the Buffalo, Tampa, and Houston, to be displayed and build anticipation.

Production of the 2009 Taurus's counterparts, the Ford Taurus X and the Mercury Sable, ended production in February and May 2009 respectively at Ford's Chicago Assembly Plant. The sixth-generation Taurus' production started on June 15, 2009, for the 2010 model year. Unlike previous Taurus generations, the sixth-generation Taurus no longer had a Sable counterpart, as Ford would sunset the Mercury brand by the end of 2010. Lincoln in turn, began marketing a Taurus derivative, the Lincoln MKS which launched for the 2009 model year.

== Design overview ==
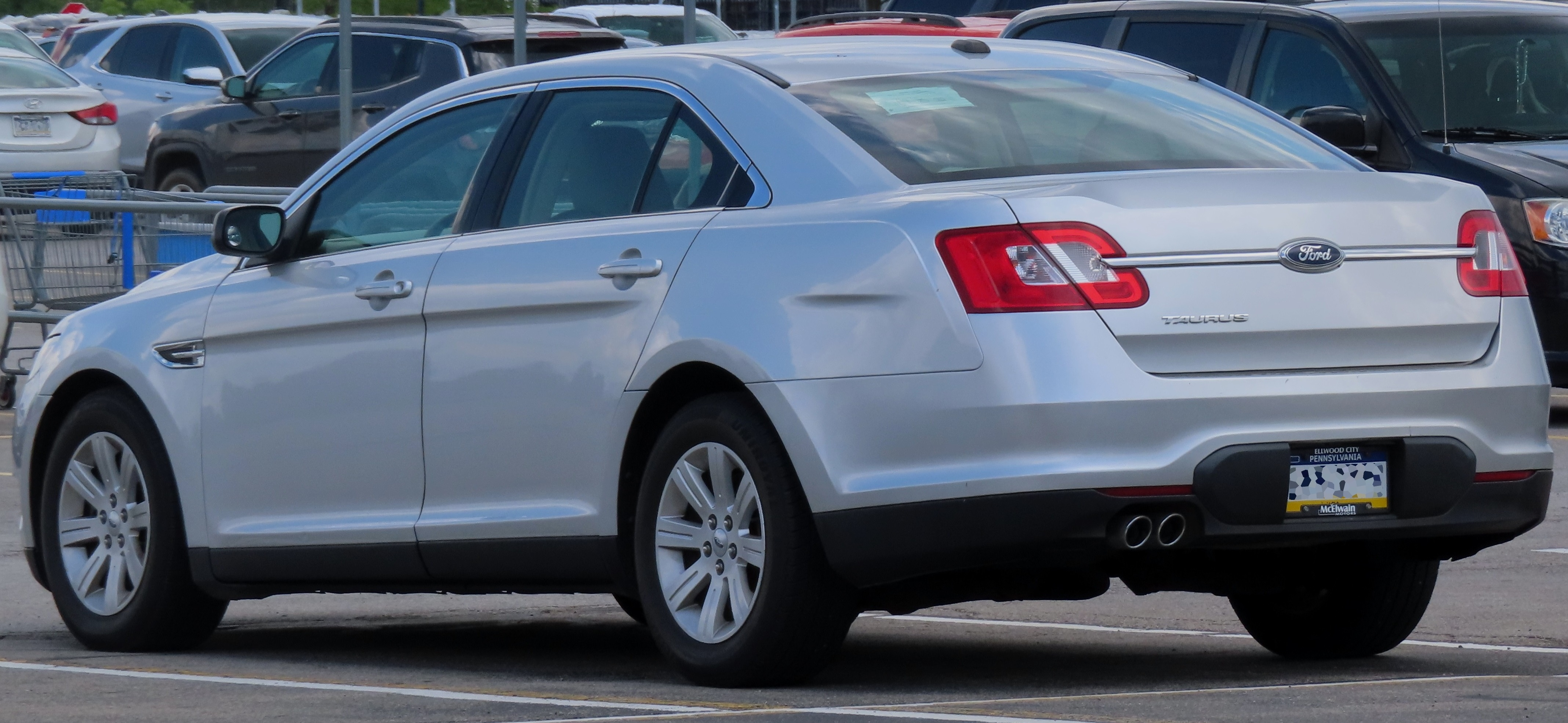
Ford Taurus SE

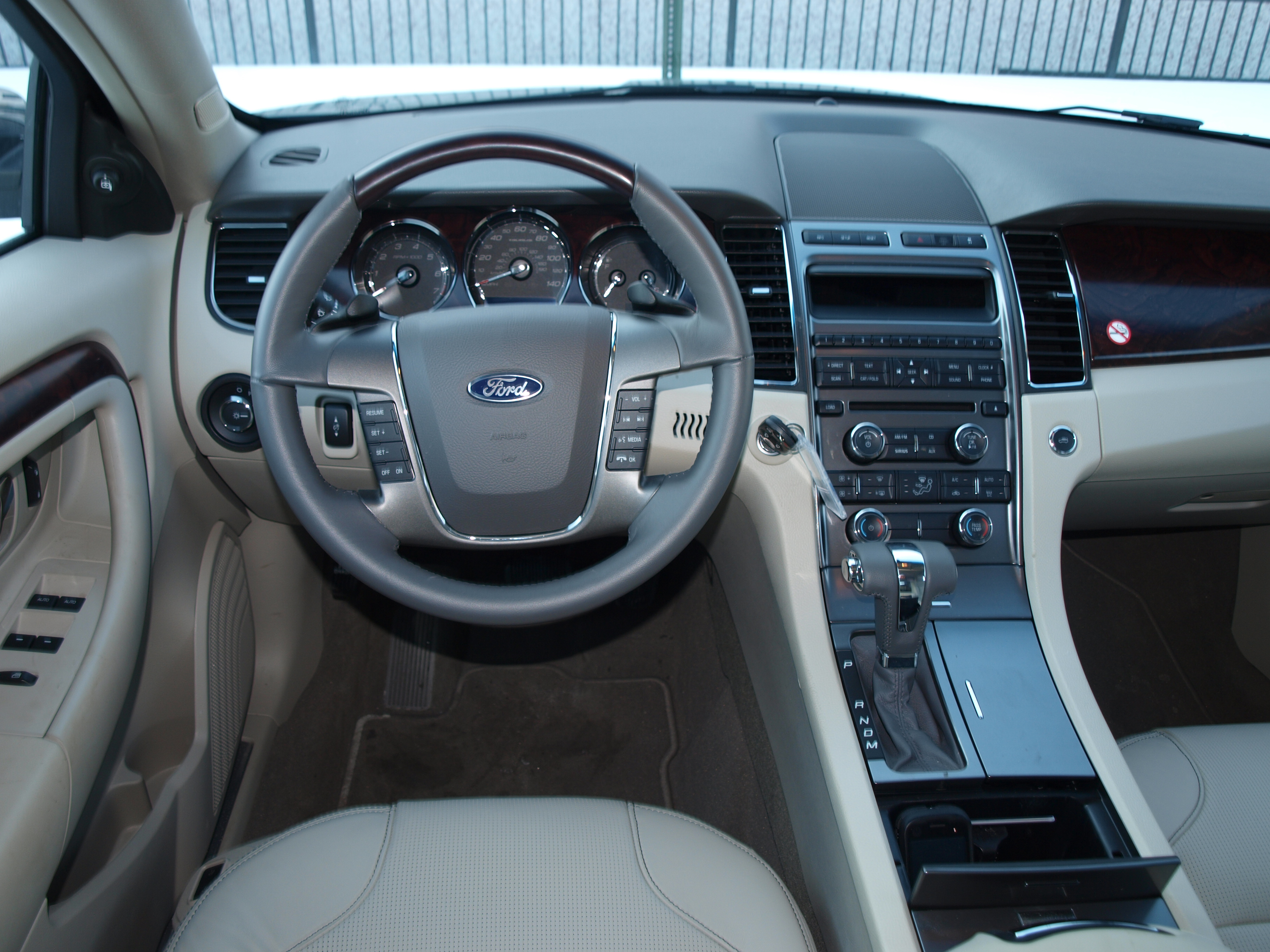
Interior

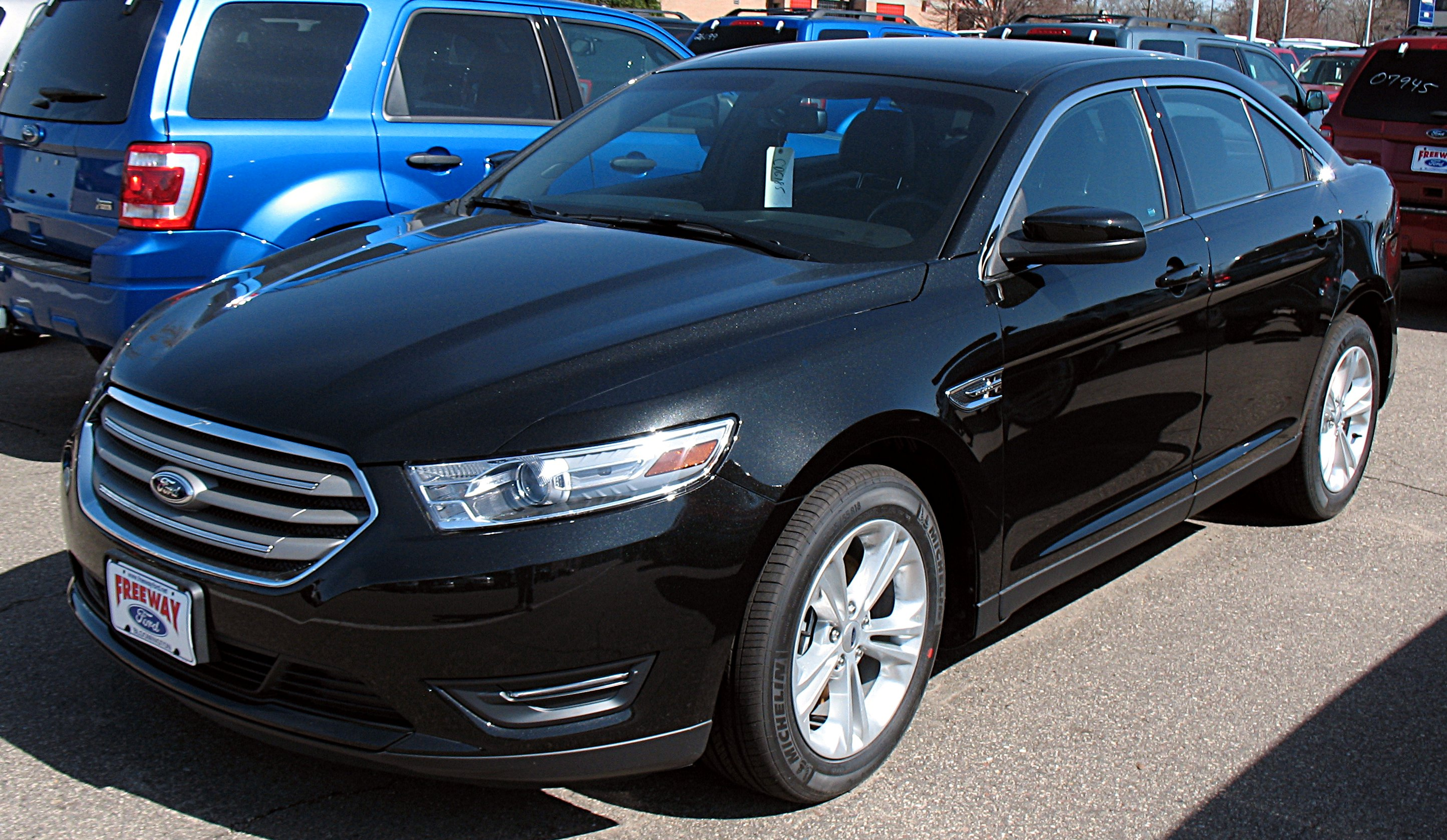
Facelift Ford Taurus SEL

=== Chassis ===
The sixth-generation Ford Taurus used the Volvo-derived Ford D3 platform architecture, sharing the 112.9-inch wheelbase of the Lincoln MKS and the Five Hundred. As with its predecessor, the Ford Taurus featured a front-wheel drive powertrain with optional all-wheel drive (standard on the SHO).

As with all other D3 sedans, the Ford Taurus used four-wheel independent suspension, featuring MacPherson struts and rearward-facing lower L-arms with a stabilizer bar in the front and a multilink coilover shock setup with stamped steel lower control arms and cast upper control arms in the rear — and four-wheel antilock disc brakes. On all models, AdvanceTrac combines traction control and stability control, with Torque Vectoring Control and Curve Control optional on all-wheel drive models.

Safety innovations included BLIS, Adaptive cruise control, Forward Collision Warning with Brake Support, and Lane keeping assist. As with its predecessor, the Ford Taurus was equipped with dual front airbags, side airbags, and curtain airbags.

Although previewed by the V8-powered Ford Interceptor and is a full-size sedan like the Ford Crown Victoria, the sixth-generation Ford Taurus was not available with a V8 engine. At its 2010 launch, the standard engine was the 263 hp (196 kW), 3.5-liter V6 retained from the previous Taurus, which was upgraded to 288 hp (215 kW) in 2013. The Taurus SHO was powered by a 365 hp (272 kW) twin-turbocharged version of this engine (EcoBoost V6) shared with the Lincoln MKS and MKT. In 2013, a 3.7L 305 hp non-turbocharged V6 became the available for the Police Interceptor Sedan and was unavailable on the standard Taurus. In 2014, a 2.0-liter, turbocharged 240 hp (179 kW) four-cylinder (EcoBoost 2.0) became optional on the SEL and Limited models, becoming the first four-cylinder Taurus since 1991 (also the smallest engine ever fitted in a Taurus). The 2.0 EcoBoost engine was dropped after the 2017 model year. All versions of the Taurus use variations of the Ford six-speed 6F automatic transmission.

=== Body ===
The design of the sixth-generation Ford Taurus was led by Chief Designer Earl Lucas. Many of the Taurus' design elements were influenced by the music that the design team listened to. According to Earl Lucas, "When you've got good music, it's amazing how many shapes come out". The 2007 Ford Interceptor concept would also lend design influence to the grille, rear fascia and taillamps, as well as the roofline.

The sixth-generation Ford Taurus introduced Ford Sync, push-button start, and heated front and rear seats. Multi-Contour Seats, a first in Ford vehicles when introduced in 2010, featured air cushions that pad the driver and passenger's back (three for lumbar support, four for lateral support and four for the seat pad). The bottom cushion features Active Motion technology, which provides a subtle continuous massage, designed to lessen back pain on long trips.

In 2013, the Ford Taurus saw a mid-cycle refresh, adopting features of the global Kinetic Design language featured on redesigns of the Ford Focus, Ford Fiesta, and Ford Kuga. While the roofline and side panels remained, the Taurus was given a new front fascia with a trapezoidal upper grille (emphasized on the SHO and Police Interceptor) and restyled headlamps. Design features included rear LED taillamps along with dual exhaust (true dual exhaust on the SHO/EcoBoost V6; split exhaust outlets on all other versions). The interior included a revised steering wheel, instrument cluster, center stack, and shifter. A new interactive instrument cluster, the MyFord Touch system (which includes a new head unit with 8-inch touch screen), and heated steering wheel were optional. Other features new to the 2013 Taurus included a new Sony sound system featuring HD Radio and iTunes Tagging, Multicontour seats with Active Motion (massage), push-button start, auto high beams, and a rear view camera. Structural improvements provided improved driver protection small-overlap frontal crashes. For 2013, the Taurus replaced the Crown Victoria/Grand Marquis as the full-size Ford offering in the Middle East, offered in that region for the first time.

For 2014, new wheel designs were introduced, with minor changes to standard and optional equipment. A Lane keeping assist feature was added to the Driver Assist package.

In 2017, MyFordTouch was replaced by the new Sync 3 system. 2016 models could be upgraded to Sync 3 via software update. This was the final update to the Taurus.

=== Trim ===
The sixth generation Ford Taurus was sold to the public in the base SE, mid-trim SEL, and luxury Limited trims. Alongside the Limited trim, the high-performance Taurus SHO (Super High Output) served as the flagship model. The fleet-only Police Interceptor Sedan (not branded as a Taurus) replaced the previous Crown Victoria Police Interceptor for 2013.

The base SE model, designed for rental and fleet use, came stock with a 3.5 L 24-valve DOHC Duratec V6 engine, six-speed automatic transmission, manual tilt/telescopic steering wheel with audio and cruise control functions, an AM/FM stereo with a single CD player, clock, MP3 capability, and six speakers, Ford's MyKey system, and AdvanceTrac electronic stability control. All wheel drive was not available on the base SE trim.

The mid-range SEL trim level had the same engine, with a six-speed SelectShift automatic transmission featuring paddle activation, optional all wheel drive, dual-zone electronic automatic temperature control, a leather-wrapped steering wheel and shift knob, Sirius satellite radio, and a perimeter anti-theft alarm.

The top-of-the-line Limited model featured perforated heated and cooled leather-trim bucket seats, ambient lighting with choices of seven different colors, SYNC voice-activated communication and entertainment system, a premium AM/FM radio with a six-disc in-dash CD changer, chrome-accenting, heated mirrors with memory and security approach lamps, a reverse sensing system and rear view camera.

== Annual changes ==
- 2012: The Taurus received one new exterior paint color (Ginger Ale metallic) and integrated blind spot mirrors (positioned inside the power-assist sideview mirrors).
- 2013: The Taurus received a mild facelift with revised hood, front and rear fascias, three-bar grille and black mesh grille for the SHO models, revised trunklid and quarter panels to accommodate rear LED taillights, revised rear spoiler, torque vectoring control, and a 2.0-liter EcoBoost four-cylinder engine joining the 3.5-liter V-6 and the SHO’s EcoBoost V-6. A-pillar, and wheel wells received acoustic improvements. Optional equipment included a heated steering wheel, massaging seating marketed as Multicontour seats with Active Motion™, push-button start, auto high beams employing a sensor to switch headlamps to high beam when no oncoming traffic is detected, rain-sensing wipers using an optical sensor to detect the intensity of rain and/or snowfall to automatically adjust wiper speed, rear view camera activating when reverse gear is selected, projecting via the center stack-mounted 8-inch screen, andrear window power sunshade. Interior revisions included cloth-wrapped A-, B- and C-pillars, flock-lined glovebox and console storage and revised switchgear. The trunk space was completely dressed.

== Variants ==
=== Taurus SHO ===
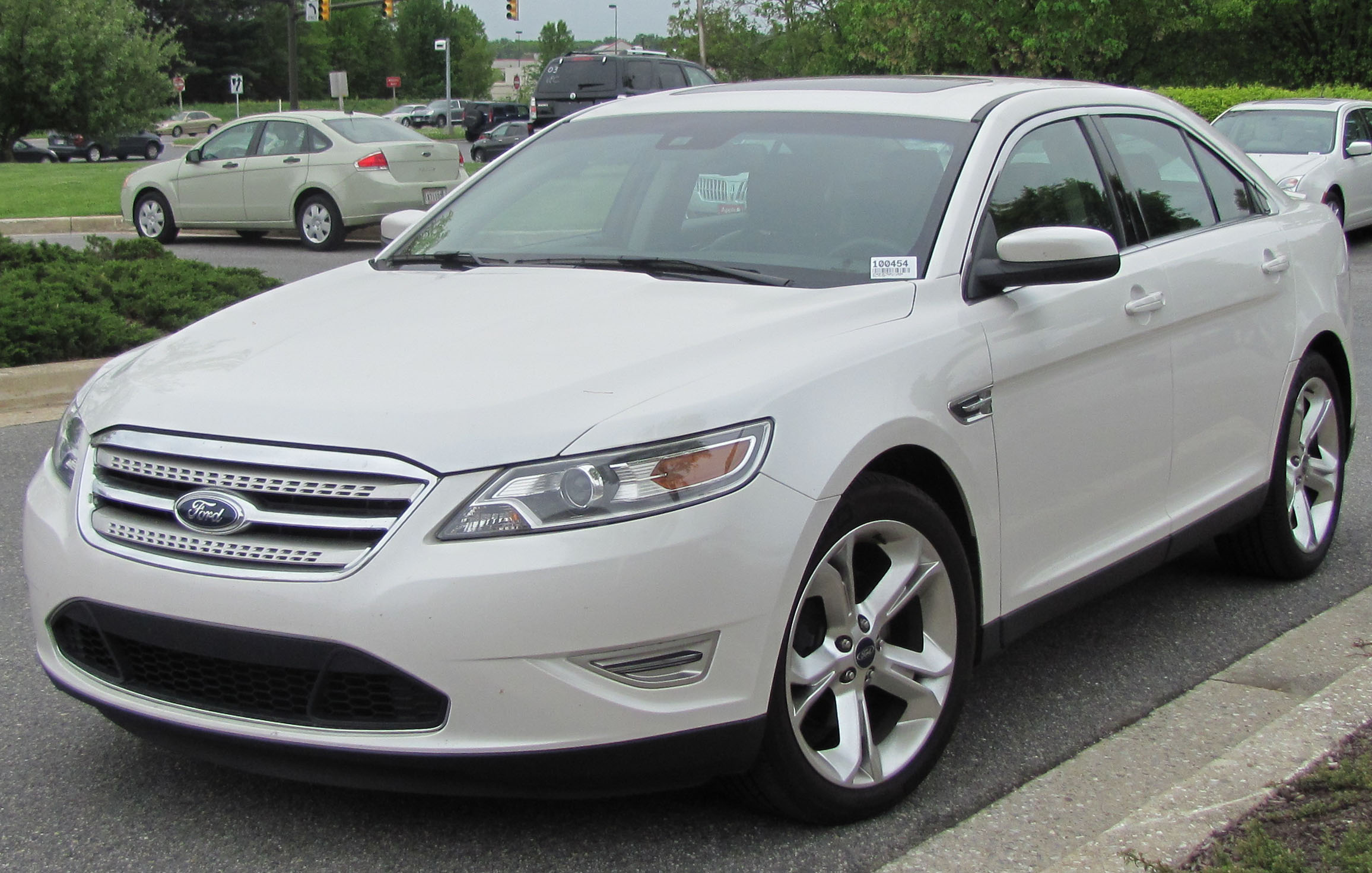
2010 Ford Taurus SHO

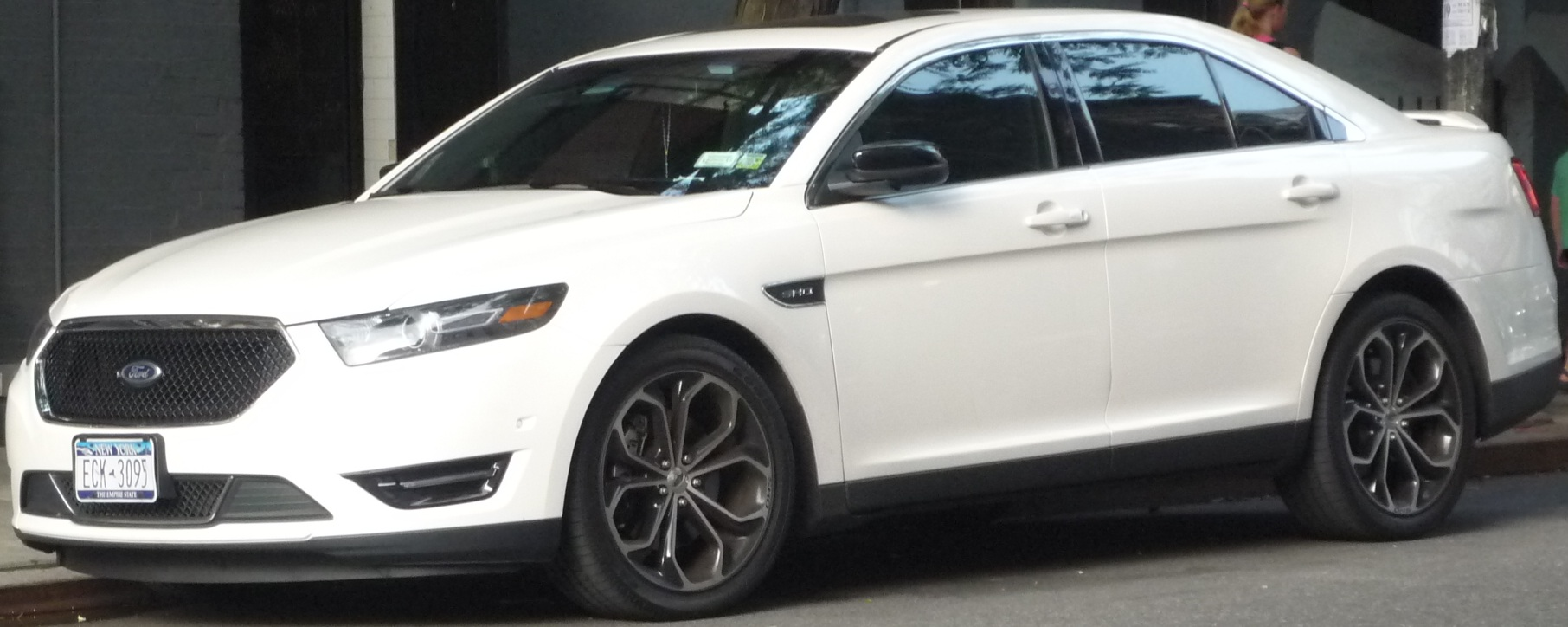
2013 Taurus SHO (facelift)

The 2010 Taurus SHO was unveiled at the 2009 Chicago Auto Show. It went on sale in summer 2009, with a base MSRP of $37,995 (including destination fees).

The SHO includes a 3.5 L EcoBoost V6 engine rated at 272 kW (370 PS; 365 hp) at 5500 rpm and 475 N⋅m (350 lb⋅ft) of torque at 1500 rpm, a SelectShift 6-speed automatic transmission with control paddles mounted on the steering wheel, torque-sensing all-wheel drive, sport-tuned suspension and steering, 19-inch alloy wheels with Goodyear Eagle tires (Michelin high-performance tires on the optional 20-inch wheels), a decklid-mounted spoiler, twin chrome exhaust tips, and SHO-specific parking lamp bezels.

The SHO Performance Package includes upgraded brake pads, recalibrated electronic power-assisted steering for improved responsiveness, a "Sport Mode" setting for the Electronic Stability Control, ability to turn off the AdvanceTrac stability control system, 27mm front anti-roll bar instead of the standard 29mm front anti-roll bar for more neutral turn-in, vented front brake dust shields from the Police Interceptor, cooling package from the Police Interceptor (engine oil, transmission oil, and power transfer unit), a shorter 3.16 to 1 final drive ratio for faster acceleration, and summer-compound 20" Goodyear Eagle F1 performance tires with premium painted wheels. 0 to 60 mph (0 to 97 km/h) time is rated at 5.2 seconds.

=== Police Interceptor Sedan ===
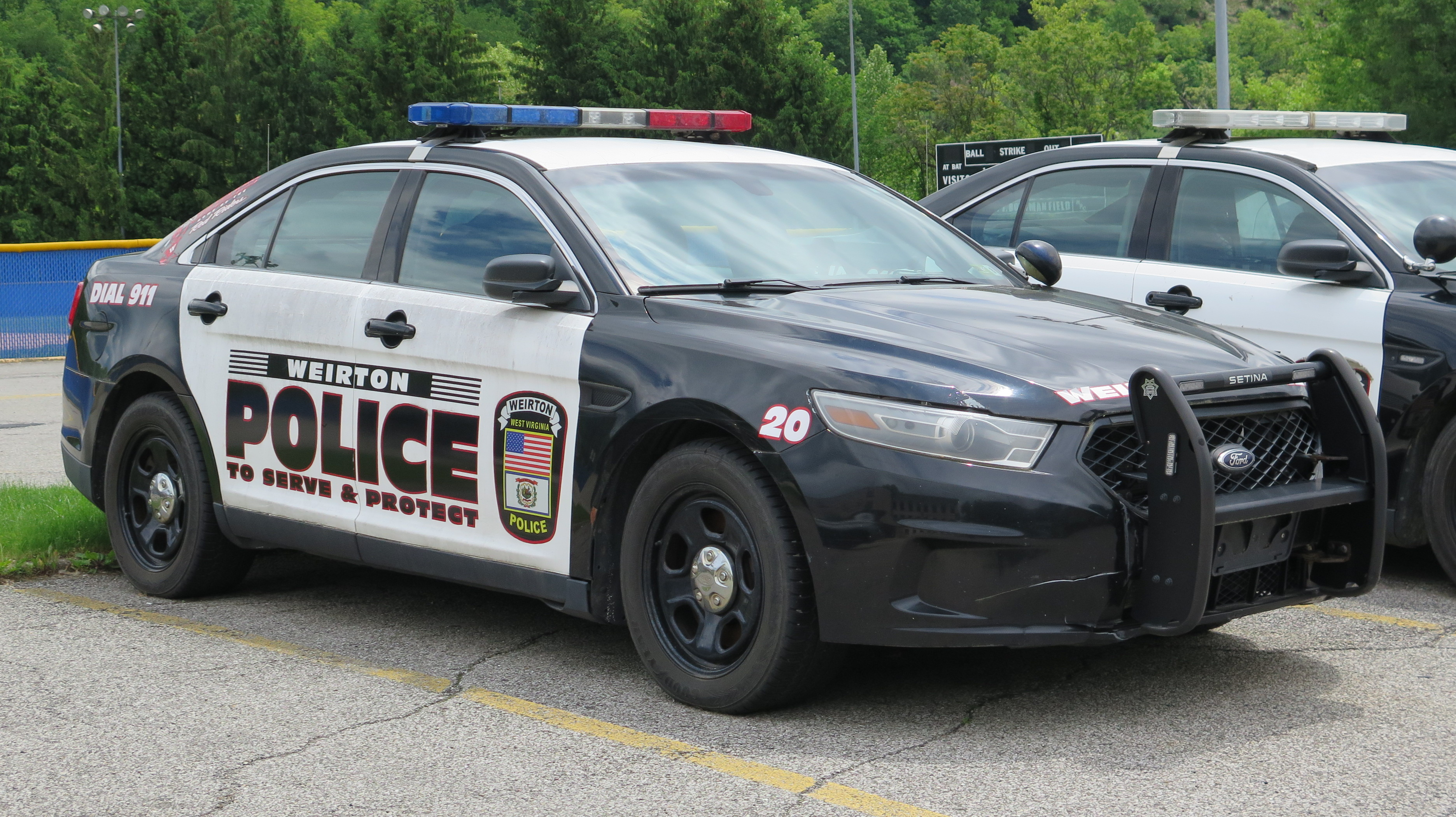
Ford Police Interceptor Sedan with the Weirton Police Department in West Virginia

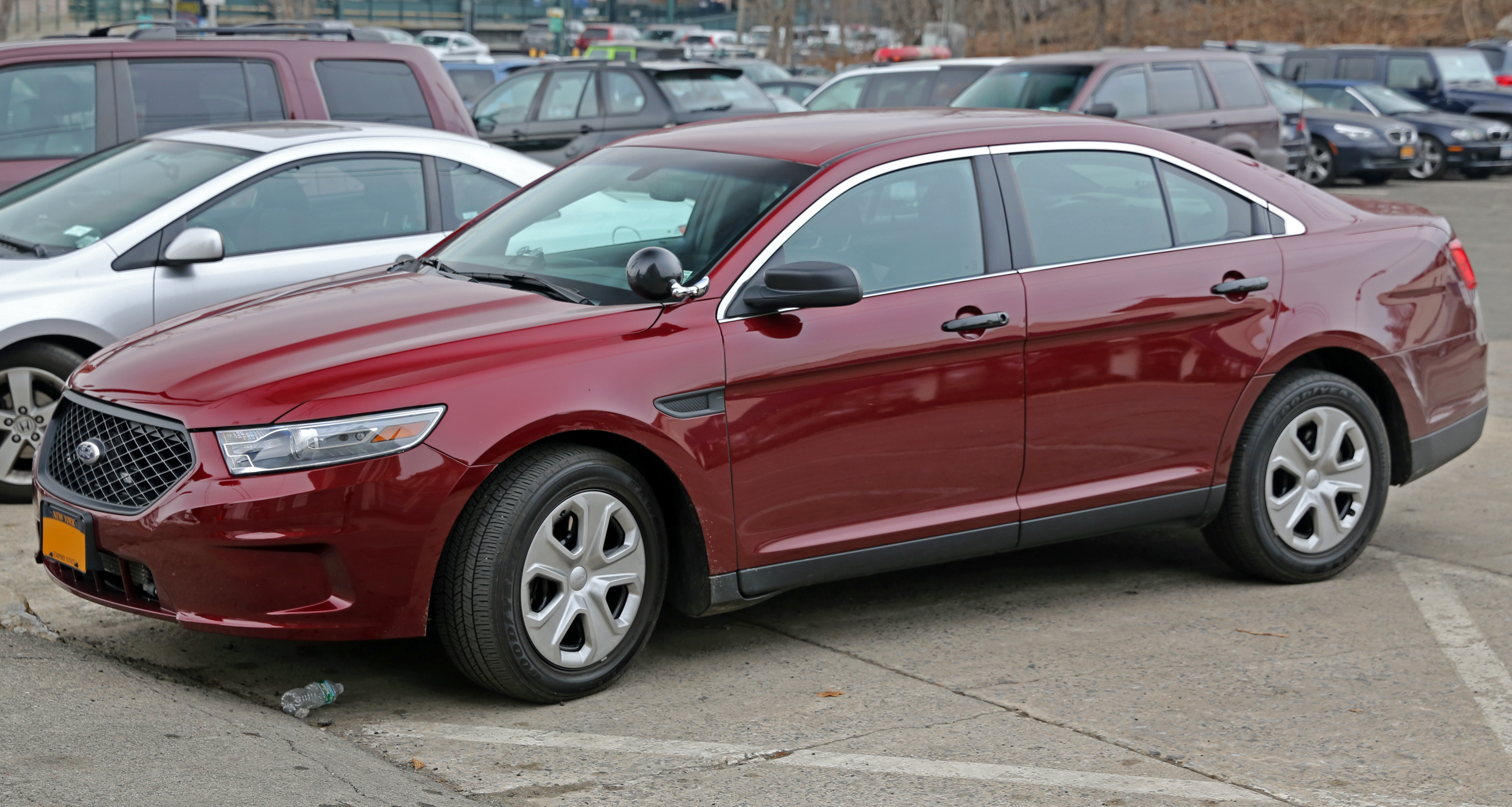
Unmarked police car version

When the Ford Crown Victoria Police Interceptor (CVPI) ended production in late 2011, Ford developed two new models to replace it, as part of their Ford Police Interceptor range. For the 2013 model year, Ford introduced the Taurus-based Ford Police Interceptor Sedan (FPIS) and Explorer-based Ford Police Interceptor Utility (FPIU). Co-developed and tested by the Los Angeles County Sheriff's Department and the Michigan State Police, the FPIS was a specially designed variant of the sixth-generation Taurus.

Unlike the outgoing CVPI, the sedan was unavailable with a V8 engine or rear-wheel drive. Initially, the FPIS was offered with a standard 3.5 L naturally aspirated V6 with front- or all-wheel drive that made 288 hp (215 kW) and 254 lb⋅ft (344 N⋅m) of torque, as well an optional 3.5 L EcoBoost V6 with all-wheel drive borrowed from the SHO, producing 365 hp (272 kW). The EcoBoost version of the FPIS had several features that were shared with the Taurus SHO Performance Package and not available with the other engine choices such as its SHO Performance Package-calibrated electronic power steering system, and 3.16 final drive ratio. From its release in 2013 to its discontinuation in 2019, the EcoBoost FPIS was ranked as the fastest police car in the U.S., with a 0-60 time of 5.7 seconds and a top speed of 150 mph (240 km/h). Shortly after the FPIS's release, a naturally aspirated 3.7 L engine taken from the Ford Mustang (in transverse arrangement) was added to the lineup, replacing the naturally aspirated 3.5 L V6 as the standard engine. However, the naturally aspirated 3.5 L remained available as a cost-saving option. The new 3.7 L V6 was not available on the civilian Ford Taurus. Its 3.7 L (227.4 cu in) aluminum block V6 engine weighed 40 lb (18 kg) less than the previous version. It produced 305 hp (227 kW) and 279 lb⋅ft (378 N⋅m) of torque. All available engines came standard with a six-speed automatic transmission, and all-wheel drive. Front-wheel drive was an available cost-saving option for the naturally aspirated 3.5 L V6 version. The naturally aspirated 3.5L and 3.7L V6 engines came standard with Ford's Twin Independent Variable Camshaft Timing (Ti-VCT) system. Flex Fuel was an available option for both the naturally aspirated 3.5 L and 3.7 L engines, enabling them to run on E85 fuel.

Ford stated that the FPIS would match the safety record of the outgoing CVPI. The FPIS was available with a host of safety technologies not available on the CVPI, such as Blind Spot Information System, a rear-view camera, Ford SYNC, a reverse sensing system, automatic headlights, electronic stability control, and side-curtain airbags. The FPIS was designed and built alongside the FPIU; to facilitate easier repairs and user familiarity, many parts, repair techniques, specifications, and vehicle interfaces were intentionally the same.

The entire FPIS line was equipped with a long list of standard features tailored to law-enforcement and severe-duty use, such as 75 mph (121 km/h) rear-impact protection; a police calibrated ECM for high performance driving and long idling; a heavy-duty cooling system that included an enlarged radiator, an engine oil cooler, transmission cooler, power transfer unit (PTU) cooler, and police-calibrated radiator fan settings; a 220-ampere alternator; heavy-duty 13-inch (330 mm) brake rotors with special ventilation and 18-inch (460 mm) five-spoke steel wheels; a police-tuned suspension with upsized sway bars and premium wheel hubs; steel deflector plates along the underbody; reinforced frame points; reinforced front door hinges with large tethers, and a specially tuned electronic stability control system set up for emergency-style driving. The interior offered heavy-duty front and rear cloth seats or rear vinyl seats, stab-proof front seat-backs, vinyl or carpeted flooring, a column shifter as opposed to a floor shifter, washable rear door panels, programmable steering wheel buttons, the ability to disable the rear door handles and switches from the factory, specialized areas to mount emergency equipment, and a certified-calibration speedometer (140 mph [230 km/h] for the standard 3.5 L, 160 mph [260 km/h] for the EcoBoost and 3.7 L versions). For the duration of the FPIS's production, Ford partnered with emergency vehicle equipment manufacturer Whelen Engineering Company to offer preinstalled emergency equipment. Each purchasing police agency could choose from a variety of options when ordering the vehicle. Options included premade wire harnesses, lighting packages, and siren controllers. Ford marketed this customizable package as the 'Ready for the Road' option.

Like the outgoing CVPI, Ford offered hubcaps, additional colors, and the option to delete the model badge in order to give the vehicle a more civilian-like appearance for unmarked use. Ford offered a Taurus-based "Special Service Sedan" with some of the same features as the Police Interceptor Sedan; however, it used a 2.0 L EcoBoost four-cylinder and was designed only for detective and administrative uses. The Special Service Sedan was equipped with heavy-duty suspension, braking, and cooling components like its Interceptor counterpart. It came standard with active grille shutters, and was available only with front wheel drive. Despite being designed solely for detective and administrative uses, it became pursuit rated in 2015. The Special Service Sedan was dropped after the 2017 model year.

As Ford considered in 2015 whether to continue producing the Taurus in the United States, one reason to do so was the FPIS, though the Police Interceptor Utility was more popular and sales of the police sedan were down. In March 2019, the Taurus-based FPIS was discontinued along with the rest of the Taurus line. It was succeeded by the second generation Explorer-based Police Interceptor Utility. Its intended replacement, the Fusion-based Police Responder Hybrid Sedan, was discontinued after the 2020 model year.

Ford Police Interceptor Sedan Performance Specs (based on Michigan State Police testing):

| Engine | Displacement | Power | Torque | Notes | 0–60 mph (97 km/h) | Top speed |
|---|---|---|---|---|---|---|
| 2.0 L EcoBoost I4 | 2.0 L (1,999 cc; 122.0 cu in) | 240 hp (179 kW) | 270 lb⋅ft (366 N⋅m) | Special Service Sedan | 8.6 seconds | 121 mph (195 km/h) |
| 3.5 L V6 | 3.5 L (3,496 cc; 213.3 cu in) | 288 hp (215 kW) | 254 lb⋅ft (344 N⋅m) | N/A, front wheel drive, Ti-VCT | 7.5 seconds | 131 mph (211 km/h) |
| 3.5 L V6 | 3.5 L (3,496 cc; 213.3 cu in) | 288 hp (215 kW) | 254 lb⋅ft (344 N⋅m) | N/A, AWD, Ti-VCT | 7.8 seconds | 131 mph (211 km/h) |
| 3.5 L EcoBoost V6 | 3.5 L (3,496 cc; 213.3 cu in) | 365 hp (272 kW) | 350 lb⋅ft (475 N⋅m) | Twin-turbocharged, AWD | 5.7 seconds | 150 mph (241 km/h) |
| 3.7 L V6 | 3.7 L (3,726 cc; 227.4 cu in) | 305 hp (227 kW) | 279 lb⋅ft (378 N⋅m) | Late availability, AWD, Ti-VCT | 7.6 seconds | 132 mph (212 km/h) |

== Reception ==
The Ford scored well in test drives, and the media were pleased with some of the new features, including cross traffic alert, collision warning, blind spot monitoring and adaptive cruise control. The Taurus shares the powertrain and technology options with the Lincoln MKS, a badge engineered marketing variant, while its MSRP starts $10,000 lower than the MKS.

The new Taurus was described as "big and muscular" to draw attention, albeit "a love-it-or-hate-it affair". Motor Trend said "its broad stance, high sill line, slit headlamps, and technical grille give it a leopard look."

The interior was criticized for its lack of interior room and reduced sight-lines despite its full-sized exterior dimensions, compared to the previous-generation Five Hundred/Taurus. Edmunds noted that the eighth-generation Honda Accord (which competes in the mid-size category) had superior driving dynamics and a more efficient design that yielded almost as much interior space as the larger Taurus. Car and Driver described the Taurus as overweight and underpowered, with unresponsive braking and steering, while Motor Trend criticized a few aspects of the interior as evidently cost-cutting.

== Water pump issues ==
Water pumps on 2008-2019 Taurus and 2013-2019 Police Interceptor models equipped with the 3.5L Ford Cyclone V6, 3.5L EcoBoost V6, and 3.7L V6 have a tendency to fail, potentially ruining the engine. The water pumps on these engines are internally mounted and driven by the timing chain. On failure, antifreeze may be dumped directly into the crankcase; mixing with engine oil and potentially damaging the head gaskets and connecting rod bearings. These failures may occur without warning, requiring extensive repairs, as the engine may need to be disassembled or removed from the vehicle to access the water pump. In some cases, the engine may need to be replaced. A class action lawsuit was brought against Ford concerning this issue.

== Safety ==
2010 National Highway Traffic Safety Administration (NHTSA) crash test ratings:

- Frontal driver:
- Frontal passenger:
- Front side:
- Rear side:
- Rollover:

Ford Taurus IIHS scores
| Moderate overlap frontal offset | Good |
| Small overlap frontal offset (driver side) | Marginal (2010–2012) |
| Small overlap frontal offset (driver side) | Acceptable (2013–2019) |
| Side impact | Good |
| Roof strength | Good |

== Discontinuation in North America ==
On April 25, 2018, Ford announced plans to discontinue the Taurus (along with the Fiesta, Focus, and Fusion), in order to focus more on its line of trucks and SUVs. The announcement was part of a plan by Ford to cut costs and increase profits in response to perceived consumer shift to SUVs and pickup trucks, away from sedans. On September 5, 2018, Ford ended all national and promotional advertising (including sales and special offers) for its entire sedan lineup, including the Taurus. On March 1, 2019, the last U.S. Ford Taurus, a white Limited model, was assembled at the Ford Chicago plant.

== See also ==
- Carbon E7
- Chevrolet Caprice 9C1
- Dodge Charger Pursuit
