= The Interception =

Russian television game show

- Перехват
- Created by: David Gamburg
- Directed by: Andrei I
- Presented by: Nikolai Fomenko
- No. of seasons: 1
- No. of episodes: 14

Production
- Executive producer: David Gamburg

Original release
- Network: NTV
- Release: 1997 – 1998

The Interception (Russian: Перехват, romanized: Perehvat; sometimes translated The Intercept) is a Russian game show which aired between 1997 and 1998. The concept was for the contestant to "steal" (actually, be given the keys to) a car and avoid the police for 35 minutes, who were tracking the car's location via a radio transmitter. If the contestant avoided the police, they won the car. The car chase was done in real Moscow streets, and had to obey traffic laws. At its peak, the show had 60 million viewers per episode.

The show was created with the cooperation of the Main Directorate for Traffic Safety (GAI); the officers chasing the "thief" were not actors. With the odds being heavily tilted against the "thieves" winning the car, the show had the aim of discouraging carjacking, which had become rampant. As the show failed to lower carjacking rates, it was cancelled due to police disinterest. Although its ratings during its run had made it the number one show on NTV, the GAI felt producers made them look like "clowns".
