= Federal law enforcement in the United States =

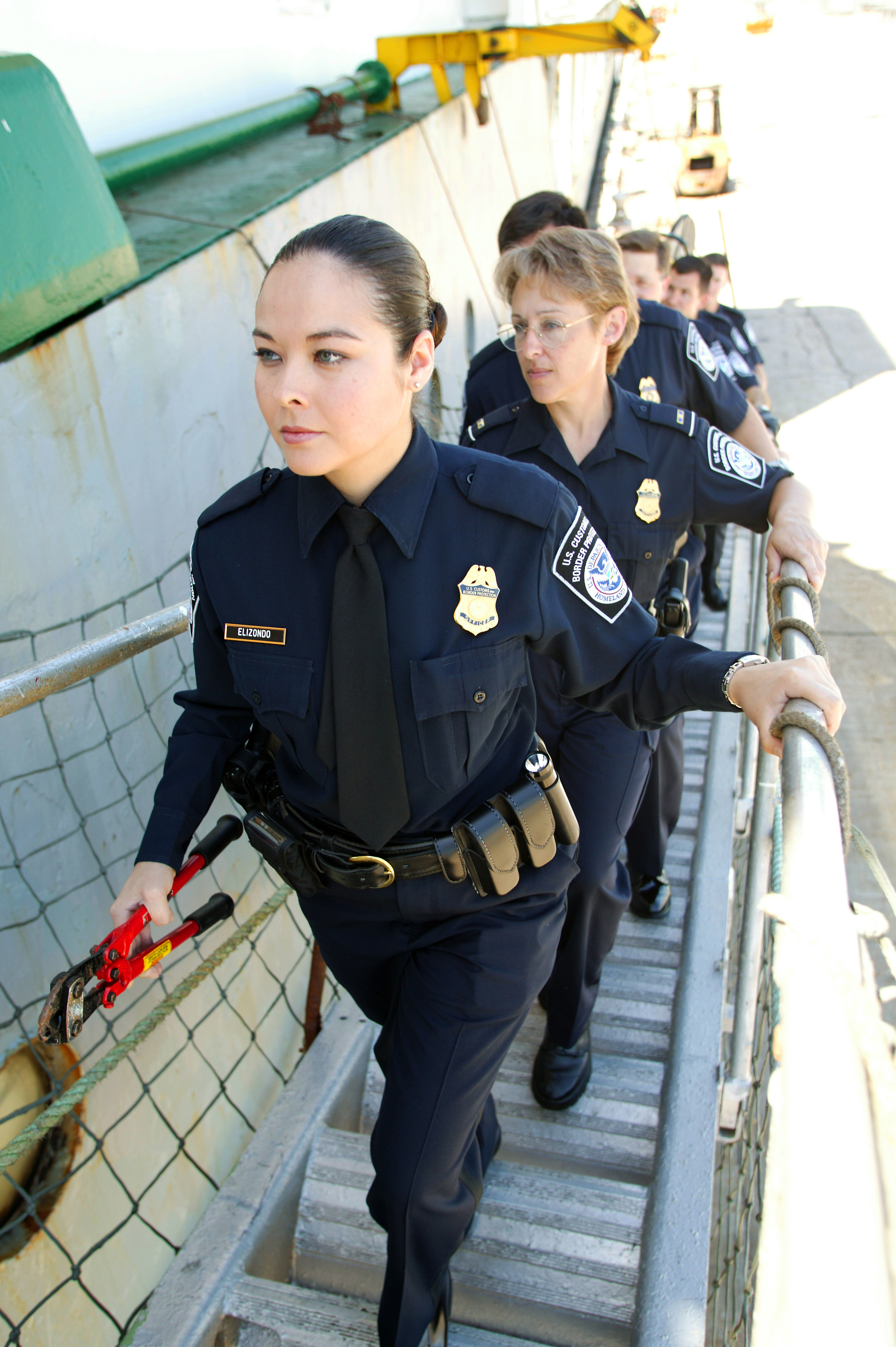
U.S. Customs and Border Protection (CBP) officers boarding a ship to examine cargo

Federal law enforcement agencies in the United States empowers a wide range of federal law enforcement agencies (informally known as the "Feds" and "Federal agents") to maintain law and public order related to matters affecting the country as a whole.

While the majority of federal law enforcement employees work for the Department of Justice and Homeland Security, there are dozens of other federal law enforcement agencies under the other executive departments, as well as under the legislative and judicial branches of the federal government.

Federal agencies employ approximately 137,000 full-time personnel authorized to make arrests and/or carry firearms in the 50 states and the District of Columbia, out of the more than 750,000 law enforcement officers in the United States; with males representing an overwhelming majority of them, about 14% being female.

== Overview and history ==
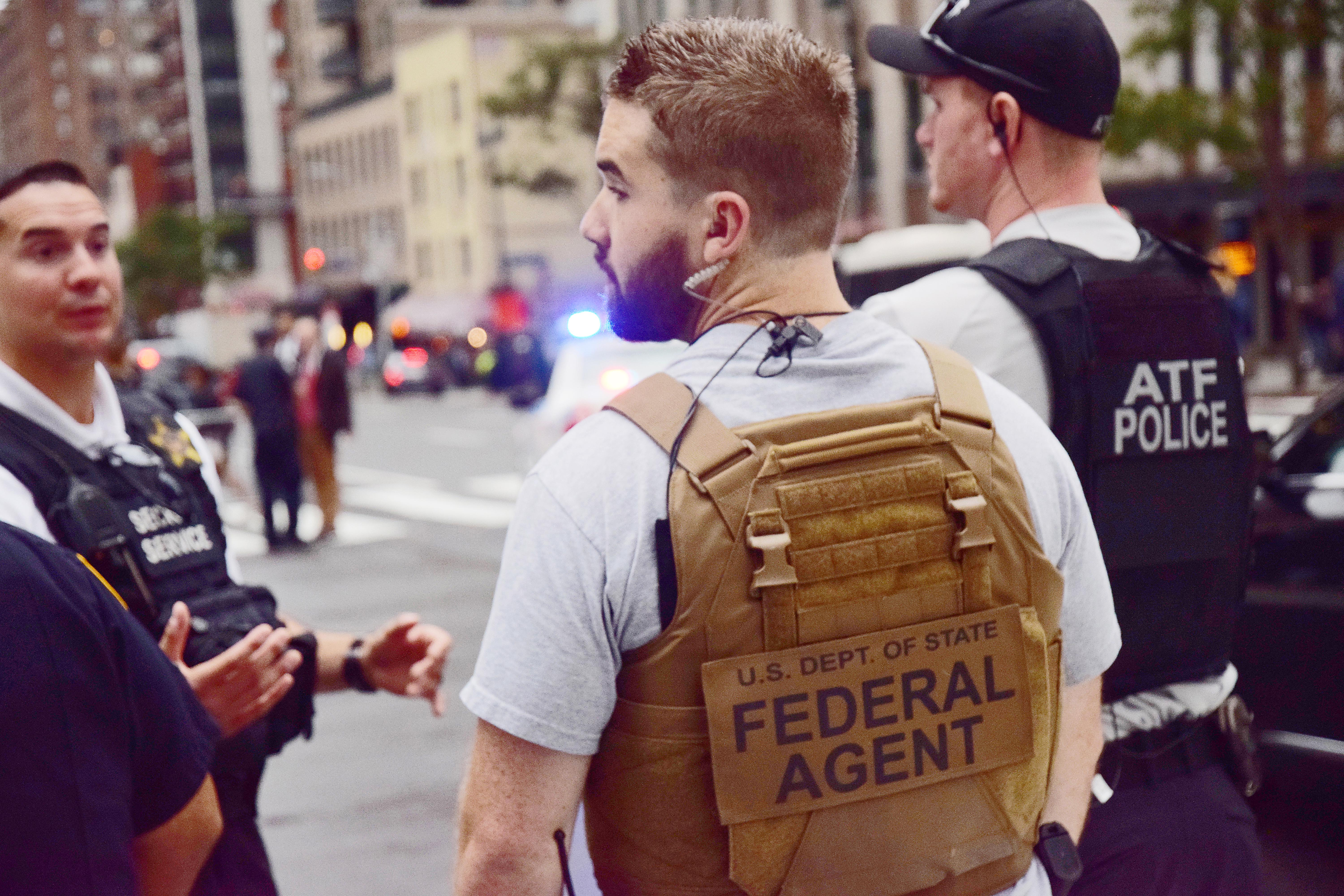
Federal agencies work with other law enforcement during events, such as presidential visits to the UNGA in NYC. Pictured: USSS, DSS and ATF

Federal law enforcement in the United States is more than two hundred years old. For example, the Postal Inspection Service can trace its origins back to 1772, while the U.S. Marshals Service dates to 1789. Other agencies, such as the FBI, are relatively recent, being founded in the early twentieth century. Other agencies have been reformed, such as the ATF which was formed only in 1972, but had its origins in 1886. Some federal law enforcement agencies have been formed after mergers of other agencies, over the years. This includes the CBP, ATF, and the DEA. In 1794, the first known federal law enforcement officer line-of-duty death occurred; Robert Forsyth, United States Marshal for the District of Georgia, was shot in the head and murdered while attempting to serve process.

Military law enforcement, although federal, consists of both military personnel and civilian officers. For example, DoD police refers to any civilian engaged in police duties for the DoD or the US Armed Forces. Each branch also has a law enforcement agency responsible for the investigation of more serious crimes and incidents, such as the Army’s Criminal Investigation Division.

Different federal law enforcement authorities have authority under different parts of the United States Code (U.S.C.). Most are limited by the U.S. Code to investigating matters that are explicitly within the power of the federal government. There are exceptions, with some agencies and officials enforcing codes of U.S. states and tribes of Native Americans in the United States. Some federal investigative powers have become broader in practice, especially since the passage of the Patriot Act in October 2001.

The United States Department of Justice was formerly the largest and is still the most prominent collection of federal law enforcement agencies. It has handled most law enforcement duties at the federal level and includes the United States Marshals Service (USMS), the Federal Bureau of Investigation (FBI), the Drug Enforcement Administration (DEA), the Bureau of Alcohol, Tobacco, Firearms and Explosives (ATF), Federal Bureau of Prisons (BOP), and others.

However, the United States Department of Homeland Security (DHS) became the department with the most sworn armed Federal law enforcement officers and agents upon its creation in 2002 in response to the September 11 attacks when it incorporated agencies seen as having roles in protecting the country against terrorism. This included large agencies such as U.S. Immigration and Customs Enforcement (ICE) Homeland Security Investigations (HSI), the U.S. Secret Service (USSS), the U.S. Coast Guard (USCG), the Transportation Security Administration (TSA), and the U.S. Customs and Border Protection (CBP) (created by combining the former agencies of the United States Border Patrol, United States Customs Service, and the United States Department of Agriculture's Animal and Plant Health Inspection Service (APHIS) into a single agency within the DHS).

== List of federal law enforcement agencies and units of agencies ==
Agencies in bold text are law enforcement agencies (LEAs).

=== Executive branch ===
==== Department of Agriculture ====
Seal of the United States Department of Agriculture

- Staff Offices Secretary of Agriculture
  - **Office of Safety, Security and Protection** (OSSaP)
- **Office of Inspector General** (**USDA-OIG**)
- United States Forest Service (USFS)
  - **U.S. Forest Service Law Enforcement & Investigations** (**USFS LEI**)
- **Animal and Plant Health Inspection Service Investigation and Enforcement Services** (APHIS IES)

==== Department of Commerce ====
Seal of the United States Department of Commerce

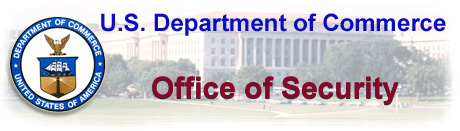
US DOC Office of Security

- **Office of Inspector General** (**DOC-OIG**)
- Office of Security (DOC OSY)
  - **US Commerce Department Police**
- Bureau of Industry and Security (BIS)
  - **Office of Export Enforcement** **(OEE)**
- National Institute of Standards and Technology (NIST)
  - **National Institute of Standards and Technology Police**
- National Oceanic and Atmospheric Administration (NOAA)
  - Office of Space Commerce, Division of Commercial Remote Sensing Regulatory Affairs (CRSRA) Compliance and Monitoring
  - National Marine Fisheries Service (NMFS)
    - **Office of Law Enforcement** (**OLE**)

==== Department of Defense ====
United States Department of Defense Seal

- **Office of Inspector General** (**DOD-OIG**)
  - **Defense Criminal Investigative Service** (**DCIS**)
- **Pentagon Force Protection Agency** (**PFPA**)
  - **United States Pentagon Police** (**PPD**)
- **Department of Defense Police** **(DoD Police)**
- Defense Logistics Agency (DLA)
  - **Defense Logistics Agency Police**
- National Security Agency (NSA)
  - **National Security Agency Police**
- Defense Intelligence Agency (DIA)
  - **Defense Intelligence Agency Police**
- National Geospatial-Intelligence Agency (**NGA**)
  - **National Geospatial-Intelligence Agency Police** (NGA Police)
- **Department of the Army**
  - **United States Army Criminal Investigation Division** (**USACID**)
  - **United States Army Counterintelligence** (**ACI**)
  - **United States Army Military Police Corps (USAMPC)**
  - **Department of the Army Civilian Police (DACP)**
    - includes **Department of the Army Civilian Guards (DASG)**
  - **United States Army Corrections Command** (USACC)
- **Department of the Navy**
  - **Naval Criminal Investigative Service** (**NCIS**)
  - **United States Marine Corps Criminal Investigation Division** (**USMC CID**)
  - **United States Navy Master-at-Arms** (military police)
  - **Department of the Navy Police** (civilian police)
  - Naval Intelligence Activity
    - Office of Naval Intelligence
      - **ONI Police Force**
  - **United States Marine Corps Military Police**
  - **United States Marine Corps Civilian Police**
  - **Marine Security Guards**
  - **Marine Security Forces**
- **Department of the Air Force**
  - **Department of the Air Force Office of Special Investigations** (**OSI**)
  - Air Force Security Forces Center (AFSFC)
  - **United States Air Force Security Forces** (military police)
  - **Department of the Air Force Police** (civilian police)
    - includes **Department of Air Force Civilian Guards (DAF Guard)**

==== Department of Education ====
Seal of the United States Department of Education

- **Office of Inspector General** (**ED-OIG**)
- **Protective Service Division** (**ED-PSD**)
- **Office for Civil Rights** (**OCR**)

==== Department of Energy ====
Seal of the United States Department of Energy

- **Office of Inspector General** (**DOE-OIG**)
- **Office of Health, Safety and Security** (**DOE-HSS**)
- National Nuclear Security Administration (NNSA)
  - **Office of Secure Transportation** **(OST)**
  - **Federal Protective Forces**

==== Department of Health and Human Services ====
Seal of the United States Department of Health and Human Services

- **Office of Inspector General** (**HHS-OIG**)
- United States Food and Drug Administration (FDA)
  - **Office of Criminal Investigations** (**OCI**)
- National Institutes of Health (NIH)
  - **National Institutes of Health Police**

==== Department of Homeland Security ====
Seal of the United States Department of Homeland Security

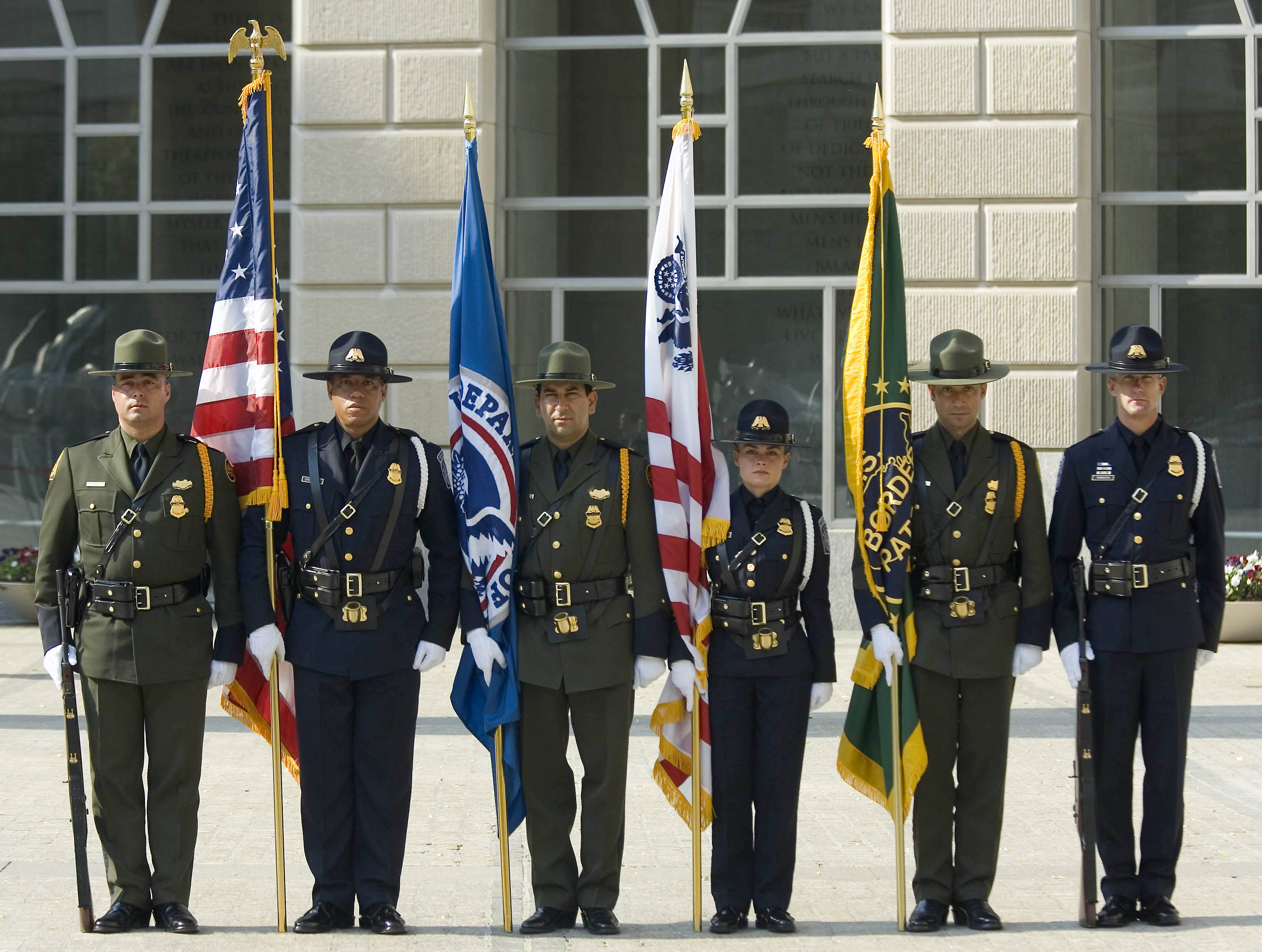
CBP Officers and Border Patrol Agents at a ceremony in 2007

- **Office of Inspector General** (**DHS-OIG**)
- **Federal Protective Service** (**FPS**)
- Federal Law Enforcement Training Centers (FLETC)
  - **Office of Security and Professional Responsibility**
- **United States Coast Guard** (**USCG**)
  - **Maritime Law Enforcement Specialist**
  - **Coast Guard Investigative Service** (**CGIS**)
  - **United States Coast Guard Police** (**CGPD**)
- **United States Customs and Border Protection** (**CBP**)
  - **United States Border Patrol** (**USBP**)
  - **CBP Air and Marine Operations** (**AMO**)
  - **CBP Office of Field Operations** (**OFO**)
  - **Office of Professional Responsibility** (**OPR**)
- Federal Emergency Management Agency (FEMA)
  - Mount Weather Emergency Operations Center
    - **Mount Weather Emergency Operations Center Police**
  - **Office of Chief Security Officer** (**OCSO**)
- **United States Immigration and Customs Enforcement** (**ICE**)
  - **Homeland Security Investigations** (**HSI**)
  - **Enforcement Removal Operations** (**ERO**)
  - **Office of Intelligence**
  - **Office of Professional Responsibility** (**OPR**)
- **United States Secret Service** (**USSS**)
  - **United States Secret Service Uniformed Division** (**USSS UD**)
  - **Secret Service Counter Assault Team** (**CAT**)
- Transportation Security Administration (TSA)
  - **Office of Law Enforcement** (**OLE**)/**Federal Air Marshal Service** (**FAMS**)
    - **Federal Flight Deck Officer** (**FFDO**)
  - **Office of Inspection** (**OI**)
- United States Citizenship and Immigration Services (USCIS)
  - **Fraud Detection and National Security Directorate** (**FDNS**) Criminal Investigation Division

==== Department of Housing and Urban Development ====
Seal of the United States Department of Housing and Urban Development

- **Office of Inspector General** (**HUD-OIG**)
- **Personnel Security Division** (**HUD-PSD**)

==== Department of the Interior ====
Seal of the United States Department of the Interior

- **Office of Inspector General** (**DOI-OIG**)
- Bureau of Indian Affairs (BIA)
  - Office of Justice Services
    - **Bureau of Indian Affairs Police**
- Bureau of Land Management (BLM)
  - **Office of Law Enforcement & Security**
- United States Bureau of Reclamation (BOR)
  - **Security Response Force** (SRF)
- National Park Service (NPS)
  - **NPS Law Enforcement Rangers**
  - **United States Park Police**
- United States Fish and Wildlife Service (USFWS)
  - **Office of Law Enforcement** (**FWS OLE**)
  - **Division of Refuge Law Enforcement**

==== Department of Justice ====
Seal of the United States Department of Justice

- **Office of the Inspector General** (**DOJ-OIG**)
- **Bureau of Alcohol, Tobacco, Firearms and Explosives** (**ATF**)
- **Drug Enforcement Administration** (**DEA**)
- **Federal Bureau of Investigation** (**FBI**)
  - **FBI Police**
- **Federal Bureau of Prisons** (**BOP**)
- **United States Marshals Service** (**USMS**)
- Office of Professional Responsibility (DOJ OPR)

==== Department of Labor ====
Seal of the United States Department of Labor

- **Office of Inspector General** (**DOL-OIG**)

==== Department of State ====
U.S. Department of State official seal

- **Office of Inspector General** (**DOS-OIG**)
- Bureau of Diplomatic Security (DS)
  - **Diplomatic Security Service** (**DSS**)

Seal of the United States Securities and Exchange Commission

==== United States Securities and Exchange Commission ====
- **Office of Inspector General** (**SEC-OIG**)
- **Division of Enforcement**

==== Department of Transportation ====
Seal of the United States Department of Transportation

- **Office of Inspector General** (**DOT-OIG**)
- United States Merchant Marine Academy
  - **Department of Public Safety** (**USMMADPS**)
- National Highway Traffic Safety Administration
  - **Office of Odometer Fraud Investigation** (**OFI**)

==== Department of the Treasury ====
Seal of the United States Department of the Treasury

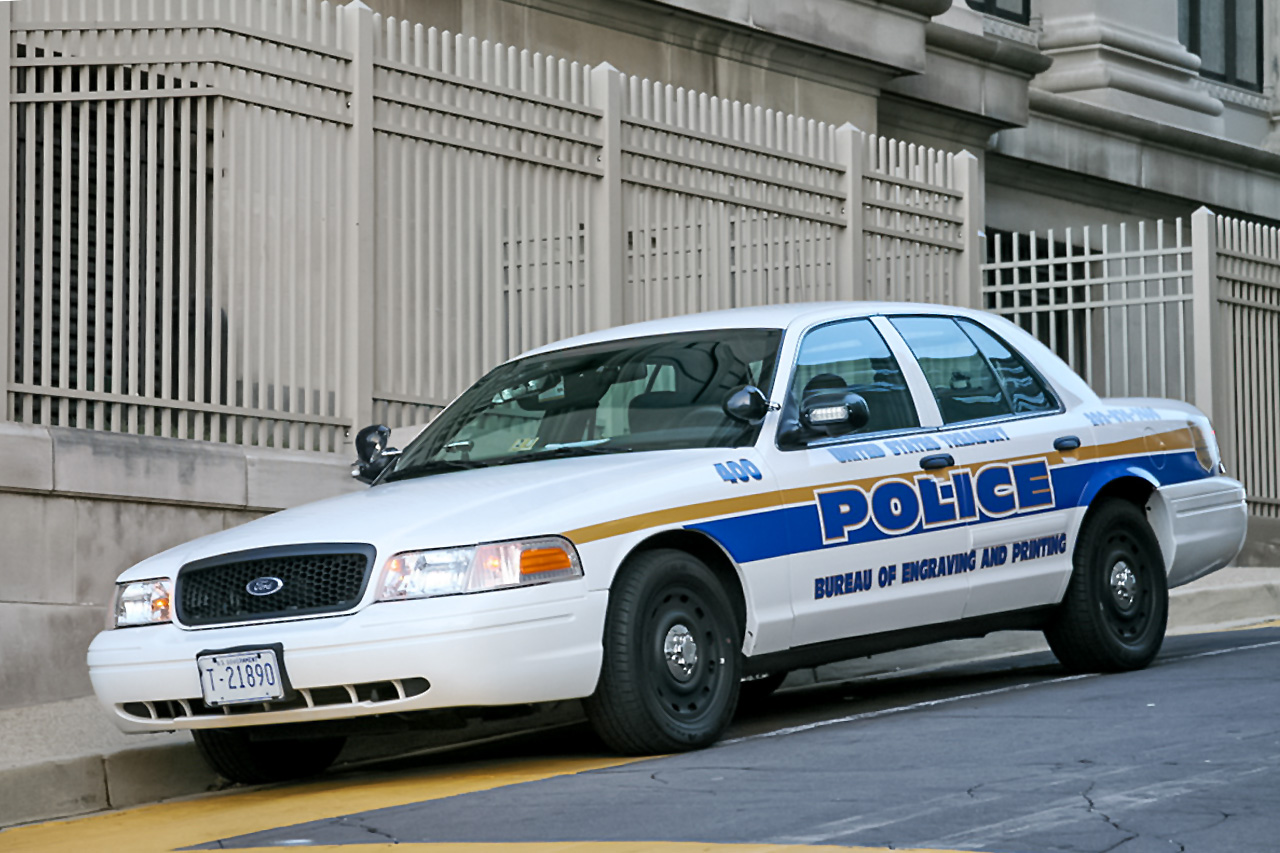
A Bureau of Engraving and Printing Police (BEP) patrol car

- **Office of Inspector General** (**USDT-OIG**)
- **Treasury Inspector General for Tax Administration** (**TIGTA**)
- **Special Inspector General for Pandemic Recovery** (**SIGPR**)
- **Special Inspector General for the Troubled Asset Relief Program** (**SIGTARP**)
- Bureau of Engraving and Printing (BEP)
  - **Bureau of Engraving and Printing Police** (**BEPP**)
- Financial Crimes Enforcement Network (FinCEN)
  - **Office of Special Investigations** (**FinCEN-OSI**)
- Internal Revenue Service (IRS)
  - **Criminal Investigation** (**IRS-CI**)
- United States Mint (USM)
  - **United States Mint Police** (**USMP**)

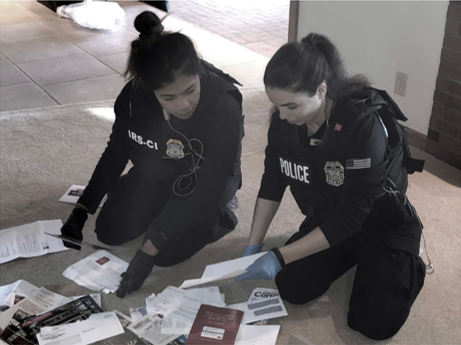
Two IRS-CI Special Agents conducting a search

==== Department of Veterans Affairs ====
Seal of the U.S. Department of Veterans Affairs

- **Office of Inspector General** (**VA-OIG**)
- **Veterans Affairs Police**

=== Legislative branch ===
Seal of the United States Congress

- Sergeant at Arms of the United States House of Representatives
- Sergeant at Arms of the United States Senate
- **United States Capitol Police** (**USCP**)
  - **Office of Inspector General** (**USCP OIG**)
  - Office of Professional Responsibility (USCP OPR)
- Library of Congress (LOC)
  - **Office of Inspector General** (**LOC-OIG**)
- Government Publishing Office (GPO)
  - **Office of Inspector General** (**GPO-OIG**)
  - **Government Publishing Office Police**

=== Judicial branch ===
- **Marshal of the United States Supreme Court**
  - **United States Supreme Court Police**
- Administrative Office of the United States Courts (AOUSC)
  - **Office of Probation and Pretrial Services** **(Federal Probation Officers)**

=== Other federal law enforcement agencies ===
Independent Agencies and federally-administered institutions;

- Central Intelligence Agency
  - **Security Protective Service** (**CIA SPS**)
    - **CIA Police**
- Commodity Futures Trading Commission
  - **Division of Enforcement**
- United States Environmental Protection Agency
  - **Office of Inspector General** (**EPA-OIG**)
  - **Office of Enforcement and Compliance Assurance** (**OECA)**
    - **Criminal Investigation Division**
- National Gallery of Art
  - **Office of Protection Services**
- NASA
  - **Office of Inspector General** (**NASA-OIG**)
  - **Office of Protective Services** (**NASA OPS**)
- United States Office of Personnel Management (OPM)
  - **Office of Inspector General** (**OPM OIG**)

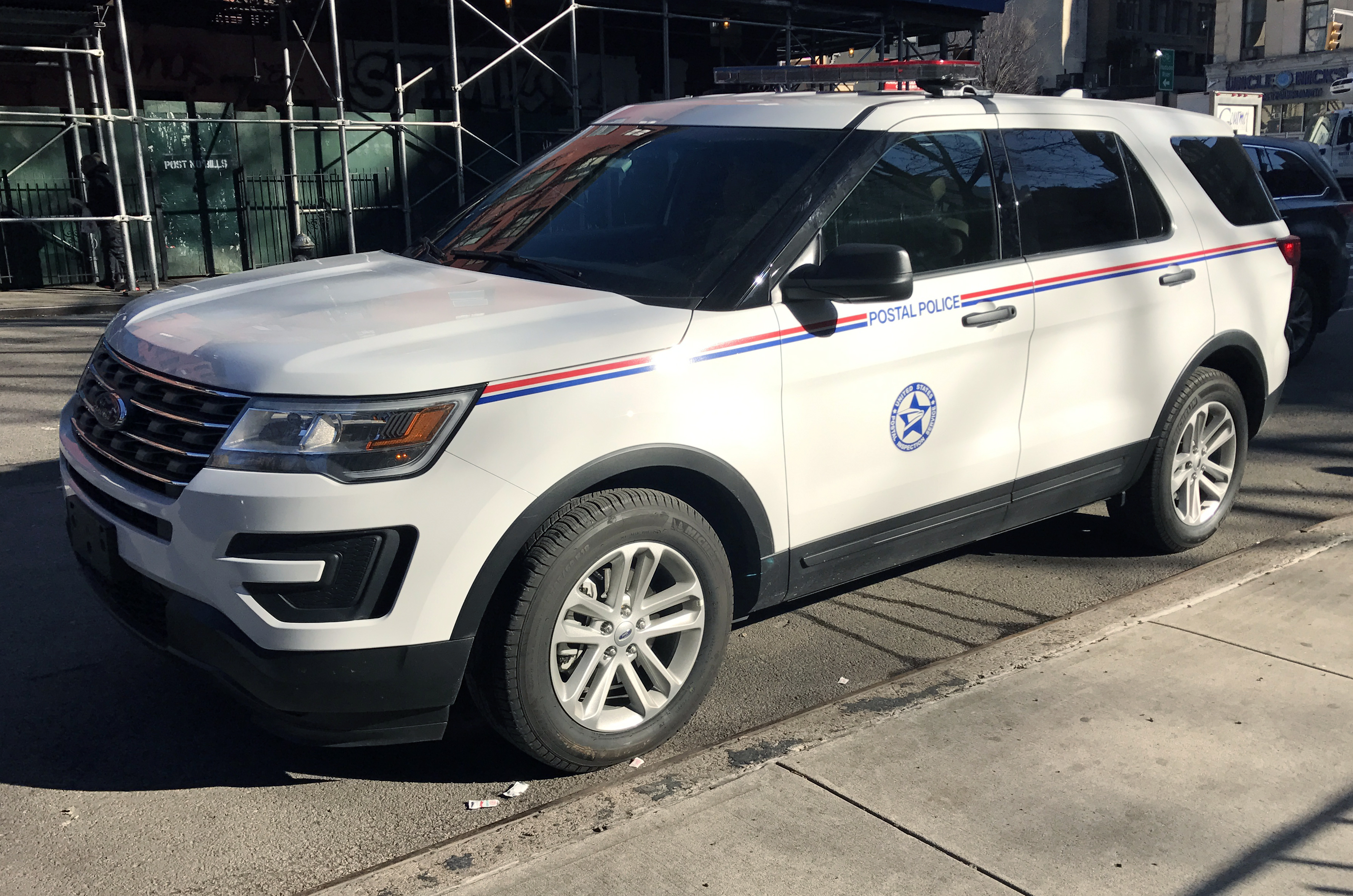
2016 Ford Police Interceptor Utility belonging to the US Postal Police, NYC

- United States Postal Service (USPS)
  - **Office of Inspector General** (**USPS-OIG**)
  - **United States Postal Inspection Service (USPIS)**
    - **U.S. Postal Police**
- Smithsonian Institution (SI)
  - **Office of Inspector General** (**SI-OIG**)
  - **Office of Protection Services**
  - **National Zoological Park Police** (**NZPP**)
- Amtrak
  - **Office of Inspector General** (Amtrak-OIG)
  - **Office of Security Strategy and Special Operations** (OSSSO)
  - **Amtrak Police Department**
- Federal Reserve System
  - **Office of Inspector General** (**FRB/CFPB-OIG**)
  - **Federal Reserve Police**
  - Federal Reserve Board of Governors
    - **Federal Reserve Board Police**
- Tennessee Valley Authority
  - **Office of Inspector General** (**TVA-OIG**)
  - **TVA Police and Emergency Management** (**TVAP&EM**)
- Nuclear Regulatory Commission (NRC)
  - **Office of Investigation**
  - **Office of Inspector General** (**NRC-OIG)**
- National Science Foundation (NSF)
  - **Office of Inspector General** (**NSF-OIG**)
- National Archives and Records Administration (NARA)
  - **Office of Inspector General** (**NARA-OIG**)
- Peace Corps (PC)
  - **Office of Inspector General** (**PC-OIG**)
- Railroad Retirement Board (RRB)
  - **Office of Inspector General** (**RRB-OIG**)
- Small Business Administration (SBA)
  - **Office of Inspector General** (**SBA-OIG**)
- Federal Deposit Insurance Corporation (FDIC)
  - **Office of Inspector General** (**FDIC-OIG**)
- General Services Administration (GSA)
  - **Office of Inspector General** (**GSA-OIG**)
- Social Security Administration (SSA)
  - **Office of Inspector General** (**SSA-OIG**)
- United States Agency for International Development
  - **Office of Inspector General** (**AID-OIG**)
- Corporation for National and Community Service (CNCS)
  - **Office of Inspector General** (**CNCS-OIG**)

== List of former agencies and units of agencies ==
- United States Revenue Cutter Service (1790–1915) (merged with the United States Life-Saving Service to create the United States Coast Guard)
- Bureau of Internal Revenue, Narcotic Division (1921–1927) (transferred to Bureau of Prohibition)
- Bureau of Prohibition, Narcotic Division (1927–1930) (merged into Federal Bureau of Narcotics)
- Federal Narcotics Control Board (FNCB) (1922–1930) (merged into Federal Bureau of Narcotics)
- White House Police Force (1922–1930) (became part of the United States Secret Service. It was renamed the Executive Protective Service in 1970 and then the Uniformed Division of the Secret Service in 1977)
- Steamboat Inspection Service (1871–1932) (merged into Bureau of Marine Inspection and Navigation)
- Bureau of Marine Inspection and Navigation (1884–1946) (functions split between U.S. Customs Service and U.S. Coast Guard)
- Federal Bureau of Narcotics (FBN) (1930–1968) (merged into Bureau of Narcotics and Dangerous Drugs)
- Bureau of Drug Abuse Control (1966–1968) (merged into Bureau of Narcotics and Dangerous Drugs)
- Bureau of Narcotics and Dangerous Drugs (BNDD) (1968–1973) (merged into Drug Enforcement Administration)
- Office of Drug Abuse Law Enforcement (ODALE) (1972–1973) (merged into Drug Enforcement Administration)
- Office of National Narcotics Intelligence (ONNI) (1972–1973) (merged into Drug Enforcement Administration)
- Canal Zone Police (1904–1982), dissolved by Torrijos–Carter Treaties
- Bureau of Secret Intelligence (BSI) (1916–1985) (replaced by Diplomatic Security Service)
- United States Treasury Police (TPF) (1879–1986) (merged with the Uniformed Division of the Secret Service)
- United States Customs Service (1789–2003) (functions split between U.S. Customs and Border Protection and U.S. Immigration and Customs Enforcement)
- Immigration and Naturalization Service (INS) (1940-2003) (functions transferred to three new entities – U.S. Citizenship and Immigration Services, U.S. Immigration and Customs Enforcement, and U.S. Customs and Border Protection.)
- Library of Congress Police (LCP) (1950–2009) (merged into the United States Capitol Police)
- Hoover Dam Police (1931–2017) (functions transferred to United States Park Rangers stationed at Lake Mead National Recreation Area and Bureau of Reclamation Security Response Force)
- Federal Investigative Services Division (replaced by National Background Investigations Bureau in 2016)
- National Background Investigations Bureau (2016–2019) (merged with Defense Counterintelligence and Security Agency)
- Defense Investigative Service (DIS) (1972–1999) (changed to Defense Security Service)
- Defense Security Service (DSS) (1999–2019) (merged with Defense Counterintelligence and Security Agency)

== See also ==
- Federal Special Agents
- Law enforcement in the United States
- List of United States state and local law enforcement agencies
- Office of Inspector General (United States)
