= Bureau of Reclamation Security Response Force =

US federal security guard force

Bureau of Reclamation Security Response Force Security Response Force
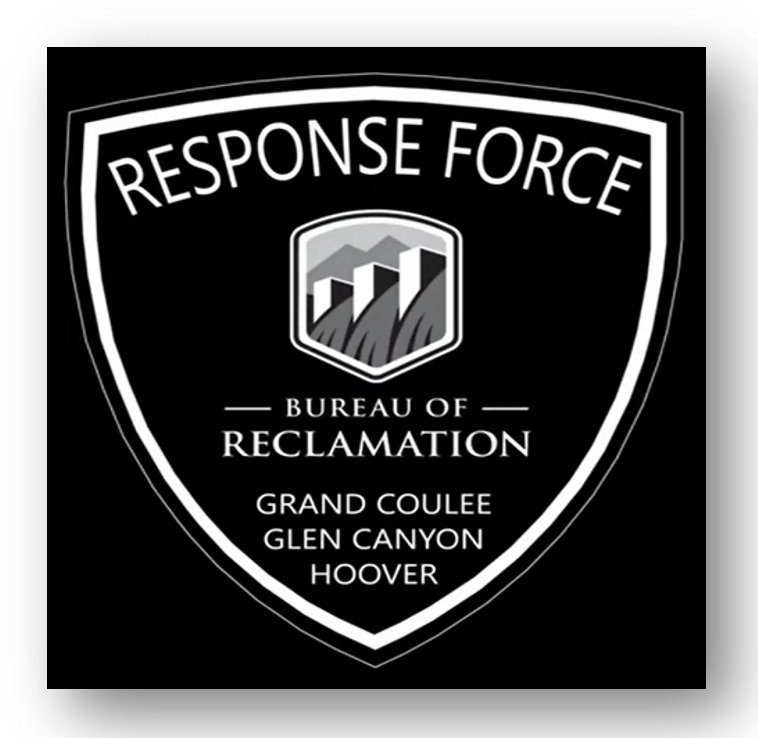
- United States Bureau of Reclamation Security Response Force patch

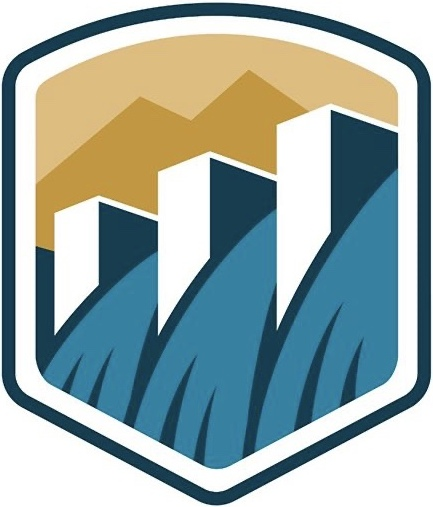
- Logo of the United States Bureau of Reclamation

- Flag of the United States Department of the Interior
- Abbreviation: SRF

Agency overview
- Formed: 2017
- Preceding agency: Hoover Dam Police

Jurisdictional structure
- Federal agency: United States
- Operations jurisdiction: United States
- General nature: Federal law enforcement

Operational structure
- Headquarters: Boulder City, Nevada
- Parent agency: United States Bureau of Reclamation

Website
- Bureau of Reclamation Security Response Force DOI Official Website Security Response Force USBR Official Website

The Bureau of Reclamation Security Response Force (USBR SRF), is the federal security guard force of the United States Bureau of Reclamation (USBR), part of the United States Department of the Interior (DOI).

The Security Response Force replaced the former Hoover Dam Police, in 2017.

They are an armed quick-reaction force for USBR property (water dams).

== Structure and Duties ==
The Security Response Force (SRF) is the security federal guard force of the Bureau of Reclamation. Personnel are known as "Security Response Force Officer"

of the following locations:

- Hoover Dam
- Grand Coulee Dam
- Glen Canyon Dam

The SRF protects the delivery of water and power to the public.

SRF protect employees, visitors and public on Reclamation lands and Bureau of Reclamation property.

== History ==
The Hoover Dam used to be policed by the Hoover Dam Police (officially known as the Bureau of Reclamation Police), but they were disbanded in 2017. The Hoover Dam is now served jointly by the National Park Service Law Enforcement Rangers and the Security Response Force.

The NPS Rangers are focused on general law enforcement activities and search and rescue missions, whereas the SRF primarily performs security duties.

== Uniform ==
SRF officers wear a tactical style uniform, with polo shirts, khaki trousers, equipment vests, baseball caps and boots.

== Equipment ==
SRF officers are armed personnel. They have marked vehicles with lightbars and spotlights.

== See also ==
- Hoover Dam Police
- Federal Law Enforcement
