= NZPP =

NZPP may refer to:

- Kapiti Coast Airport
- National Zoological Park Police
- New Zealand Public Party
