= Hoover Dam Police =

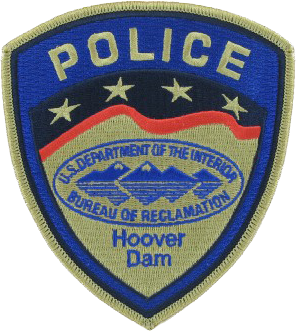

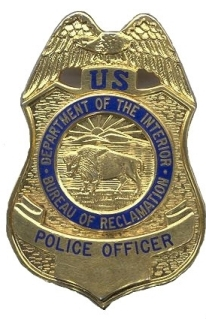

Agency overview
- Formed: 1931
- Dissolved: 2017
- Superseding agency: Bureau of Reclamation Security Response Force

Jurisdictional structure
- Federal agency: United States
- Operations jurisdiction: United States
- Area: 22 sq mi (57 km^{2})
- General nature: Federal law enforcement; Civilian police

Operational structure
- Headquarters: Boulder City, Nevada
- Agency executive: Vacant, Chief of Police
- Parent agency: United States Bureau of Reclamation

Website
- Official website

The Hoover Dam Police, officially the Bureau of Reclamation Police, was a federal security police force, stationed at Hoover Dam 23 miles (37 km) southeast of Las Vegas under the command of the US Bureau of Reclamation. Reclamation Police Officers were stationed only at Hoover Dam. Hoover Dam was both listed on the National Register of Historic Places in 1981, and was designated a National Historic Landmark in 1985. Hoover Dam has been designated as National Critical Infrastructure. The primary responsibilities of the Hoover Dam Police Officer were to protect the dam, the world's 57th-largest hydroelectric generating station, which provides about 2,080 megawatts, its associated structures, and to safeguard the lives of visitors and employees. The Hoover Dam Police were assisted by unarmed Bureau of Reclamation security guards who control access to reclamation facilities and deter individuals who might consider criminal activities or terrorist acts.

== Closure ==
On October 1, 2017, the Hoover Dam Police Department was closed and the National Park Service took over law enforcement duties for the Hoover Dam.

National Park Service Law Enforcement Rangers from Lake Mead National Recreation Area now provide comprehensive federal law enforcement and emergency services for the facility and its visitors.

The Bureau of Reclamation has assigned an armed Bureau of Reclamation Security Response Force to provide physical security for the facility.

== Security concerns ==
Because of the September 11, 2001 terrorist attacks, the Hoover Dam Bypass project was expedited and traffic across the dam was restricted. Some types of vehicles were inspected prior to crossing the dam while semi-trailer trucks, buses carrying luggage, and enclosed-box trucks over 40 feet (12 m) long were not allowed on the dam at all. That traffic was diverted south to a Colorado River bridge at Laughlin, Nevada. Once the bypass opened on October 19, 2010, all through traffic was rerouted on it; the roadway on the dam is now open only to employees and dam visitors.

== Hoover–Mead Security Zone ==
The Hoover–Mead Security Zone encompasses 22 square miles (57 km^{2}) around Hoover Dam and Lake Mead; before the opening of the bypass, this included 3.3 miles (5 km) of U.S. Highway 93 (US 93). Vehicles had to pass through inspection checkpoints, located on US 93 one mile (1.6 km) north of the dam in Nevada, and nine miles (14 km) south of the dam in Arizona, before crossing.

With the opening of the bypass, traffic patterns changed dramatically. Through traffic no longer goes through a checkpoint on either side of the river. On the Nevada side, the dam road now branches off US 93 before the checkpoint, which remains in operation to screen dam visitors. On the Arizona side, the road across the dam dead-ends in parking lots, no longer connecting to US 93. This made the Arizona checkpoint unnecessary.

The Nevada checkpoint is staffed by armed Bureau of Reclamation Security Guards plus contracted private security personnel, as was the Arizona checkpoint before its closing. Personnel at the checkpoint may inspect any vehicle at any time before it is allowed to pass through and cross the dam.

== In popular culture ==
- In the 1997 film Fools Rush In, the character Isabel Fuentes Whitman (played by Salma Hayek) delivers a baby on the Hoover Dam assisted by the Hoover Dam Police.
- In the 2007 film Transformers, the Hoover Dam Police were shown providing external security to Sector 7.

== See also ==
- Law enforcement in the United States
