= Brenda Burman =

American lawyer and government official (born 1967)

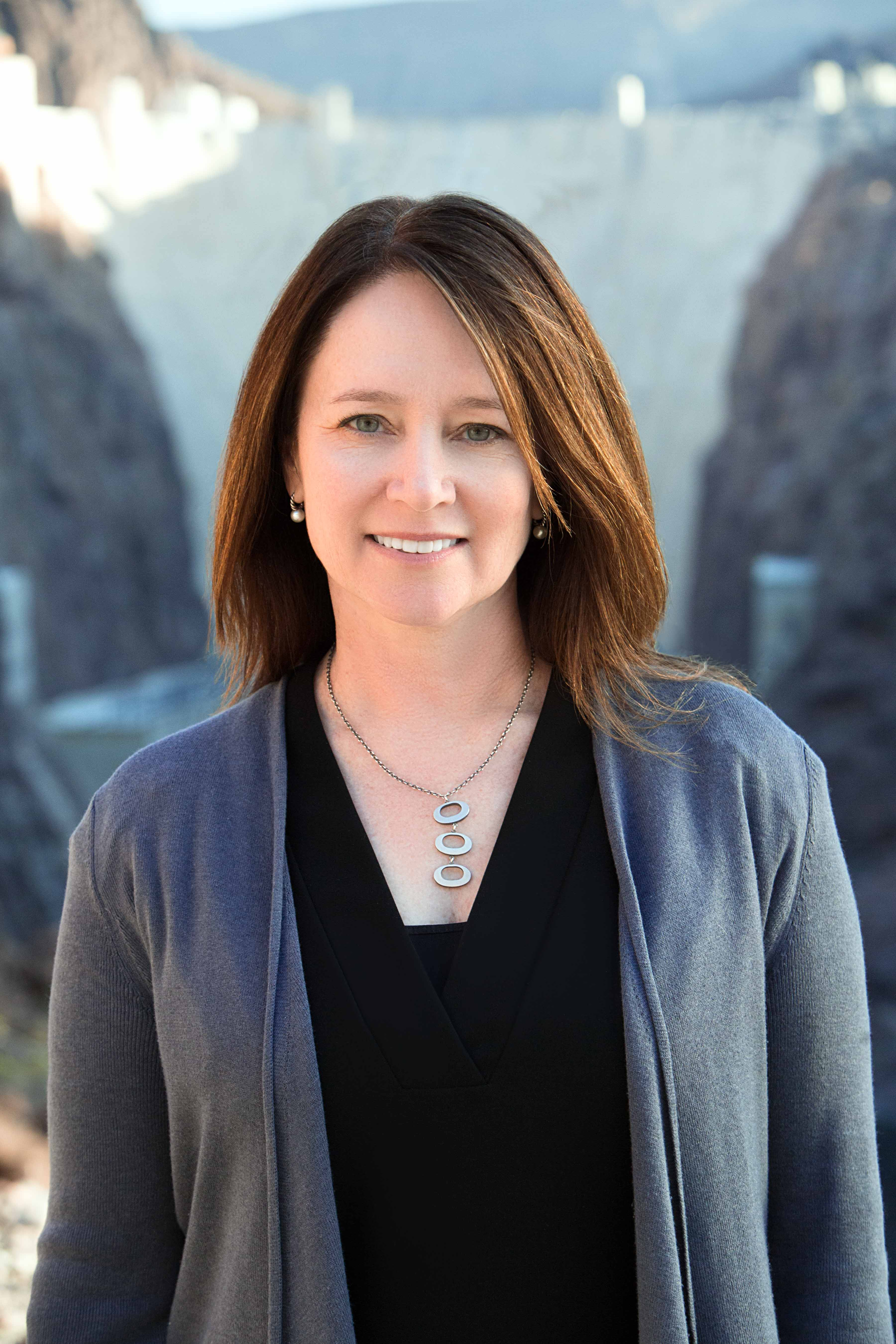

Commissioner of the United States Bureau of Reclamation
- In office November 17, 2017 – January 20, 2021
- President: Donald Trump
- Deputy: Alan Mikkelsen
- Preceded by: Estevan López
- Succeeded by: M. Camille Calimlim Touton

Personal details
- Born: Brenda Wren Burman Santa Clara County, California, U.S.
- Education: Kenyon College (BA); University of Arizona (JD)

Brenda Wren Burman is an American attorney and government official who served as commissioner of the United States Bureau of Reclamation from 2017 to 2021. Prior to assuming that position, she served as director of water strategy at the Salt River Project. Burman served in the George W. Bush administration as Deputy Commissioner of the U.S. Bureau of Reclamation and as Deputy Assistant Secretary for Water and Science. She has previously held positions with the Metropolitan Water District of Southern California, The Nature Conservancy, and U.S. Senator Jon Kyl.

== Early life and education ==
Burman was born in Santa Clara County, California and grew up in Minnesota and New Jersey. She earned a Bachelor of Arts degree from Kenyon College in 1989, where she was a member of the college's field hockey team. After college, Burman worked as a volunteer trail crew member at Carlsbad Caverns National Park and became a park ranger at the Grand Canyon. She attended law school at the University of Arizona School of Law, earning a Juris Doctor.

== Career ==
After law school, she served as a clerk on the Wyoming Supreme Court. Burman worked for four years in private practice, where she handled natural resource issues. In 2002, she became legislative counsel for energy and water for U.S. Senator Jon Kyl. As an attorney, Burman dealt extensively with Native American water rights issues.

In 2005, Burman took a role with the United States Department of the Interior as counselor to the assistant secretary for water and science. She later transitioned to the United States Bureau of Reclamation, where she served as deputy commissioner for external and intergovernmental affairs. Burman rejoined the U.S. Department of the Interior as a deputy assistant secretary in 2007.

Burman left the federal government at the end of the George W. Bush administration, joining The Nature Conservancy as senior water policy administrator. In 2011, she took a role with the Metropolitan Water District of Southern California as special projects manager. In 2015, Burman became executive water policy adviser and director of water strategy at the Salt River Project.

=== United States Bureau of Reclamation ===
On June 26, 2017, President Donald Trump nominated Burman to serve as the next Commissioner of the United States Bureau of Reclamation. She was confirmed by the United States Senate on November 16, 2017. Burman is the first woman to ever lead the Bureau of Reclamation. Her nomination was commented upon favorably by a number of public officials, including U.S. Senators Jeff Flake and John McCain; Arizona Governor Doug Ducey; and Congressman Paul Gosar. She left office on January 20, 2021.

=== Central Arizona Project ===
Brenda Burman joined Central Arizona Project in 2021 as the Executive Strategy Advisor and was hired by the Central Arizona Water Conservation District Board of Directors as general manager in January 2023. She is the fifth person to hold that position and the first female.
