= Parks Law Enforcement Academy =

Law enforcement training program in the United States

The Park Ranger Law Enforcement Academy, formally named Seasonal Law Enforcement Training Program (SLETP), is a seasonal ranger training program held bi-annually at seven different colleges throughout the United States. It consists of 720 hours of certified training. Subjects covered include constitutional law, defensive tactics, firearms, emergency vehicle operations, criminal investigation, and more.

== History ==
Formally named Seasonal Law Enforcement Training Program (SLETP) the program was developed in 1977 to ensure that temporary park rangers have the appropriate skills and judgment to carry out law enforcement duties.

== Employment opportunities ==
Successful graduation of the training program enables cadets to seek work as seasonal law enforcement rangers for several different state agencies and the National Park Service as a type II (limited commission) U.S. Park Ranger. Graduates must be hired by an agency and pass a background investigation, medical exam and drug screening before becoming Rangers or officers. Most cadets choose to work for the National Park Service. The National Park Service is the only federal agency who recognizes this training and who has seasonal law enforcement rangers. All permanent federal land management law enforcement officers attend training at the Federal Law Enforcement Training Center in Glynco, Georgia.

== Acceptance ==
Training is rigorous and as such, acceptance into the academy is highly selective. Potential cadets must submit a written application, provide three or more letters of recommendation, undergo a criminal history background check, and successfully pass a physical agility test. Most cadets are "pre-service", meaning they must pay for the cost of academy out-of-pocket.

There are currently six operational and certified park ranger law enforcement academies in the United States. The academies are accredited by the Federal Law Enforcement Accreditation Board.

College	Location	Contact website
Colorado Northwestern Community College	Rangely, Colorado	
Northern Arizona University	Flagstaff, Arizona	
Skagit Valley College	Mount Vernon, Washington	
Southwestern Community College	Franklin, North Carolina	
Vermilion Community College	Ely, Minnesota	
Temple University	Ambler, Pennsylvania	
