= M. Camille Calimlim Touton =

Filipino-American government official

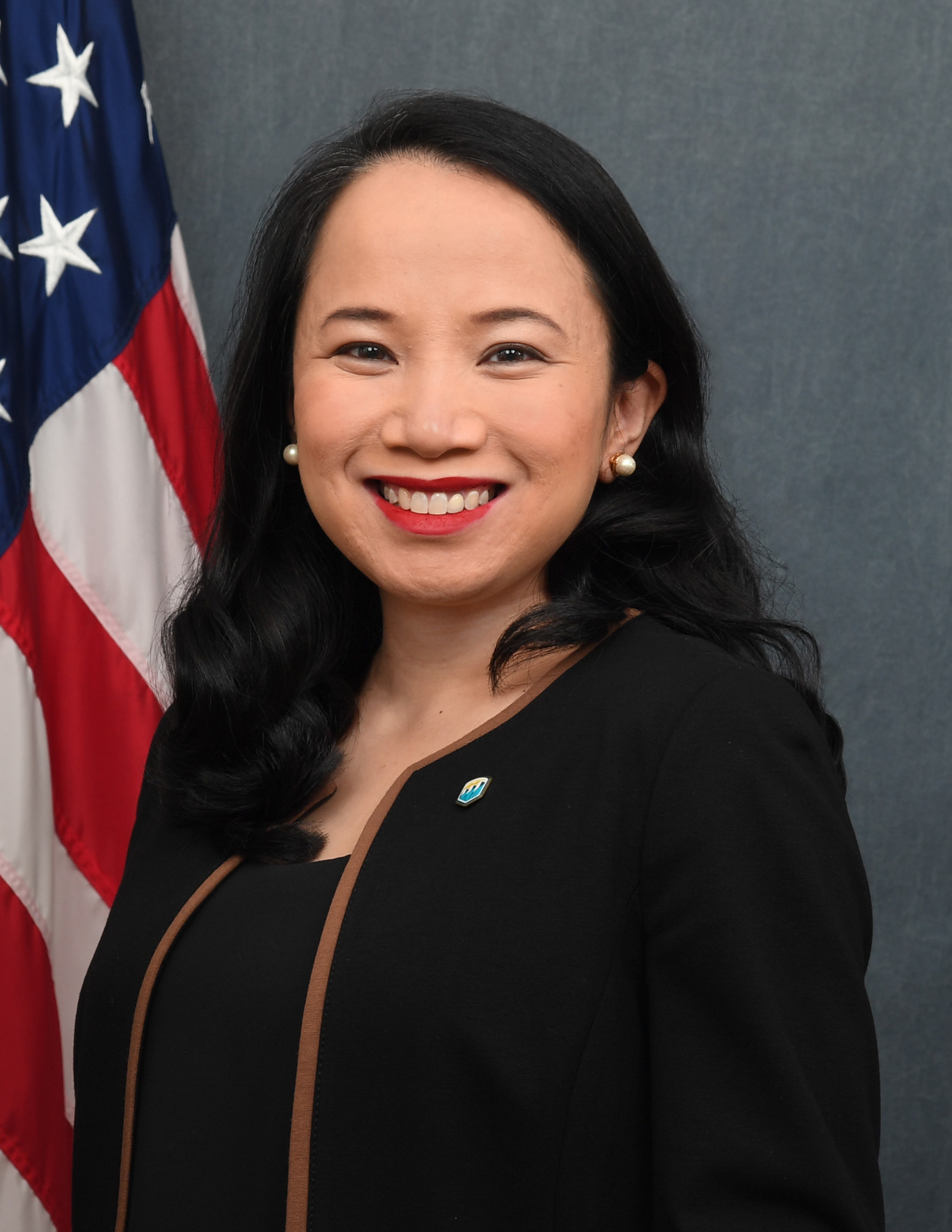

Commissioner of the United States Bureau of Reclamation
- In office December 15, 2021 – January 20, 2025
- President: Joe Biden
- Preceded by: Brenda Burman
- Succeeded by: David Palumbo (acting)

Personal details
- Born: Maria Camille Calimlim Quezon City, Philippines
- Spouse: Matthew Touton
- Education: University of Nevada, Las Vegas (BA, BS); George Mason University (MPP)

Maria Camille Calimlim Touton is a Filipino-American water policy advisor who served as the commissioner of the United States Bureau of Reclamation in the Biden administration from 2021 to 2025.

== Early life and education ==
Touton was born in Quezon City and raised in Dagupan and Calasiao before moving to Nevada with her family. She earned a Bachelor of Arts degree in communication studies and Bachelor of Science in civil engineering from the University of Nevada, Las Vegas, followed by a Master of Public Policy from George Mason University.

== Career ==
In 2005 and 2006, Touton was an Engineer in Training at G.C. Wallace Inc. in Las Vegas. She then joined the office of Senator Harry Reid as a legislative correspondent. She later became a staffer for the United States House Committee on Natural Resources, serving as an advisor to members Nick Rahall, Ed Markey, and Peter DeFazio. She was also a water policy advisor for Grace Napolitano. In 2014, she joined the United States Department of the Interior, serving as a counselor to the assistant secretary for water and science and as deputy assistant secretary for water and science. From 2017 to 2019, she was a staffer for Democratic members of the United States Senate Committee on Energy and Natural Resources. From 2019 to 2021, she was a senior staffer for the United States House Committee on Transportation and Infrastructure.

=== Bureau of Reclamation ===
On June 18, 2021, President Joe Biden nominated Touton to be the commissioner of the U.S. Bureau of Reclamation. Hearings on her nomination were before the Senate Energy Committee on September 21, 2021. The committee favorably reported her nomination to the Senate floor on November 2, 2021. Touton was confirmed by the entire Senate via voice vote on November 4, 2021.

Touton started her position on December 15, 2021.
