= Bureau of Reclamation =

Government agency

United States Bureau of Reclamation
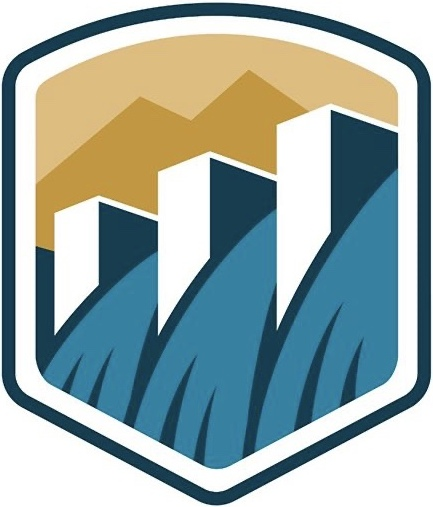

Agency overview
- Formed: 1902
- Type: Office
- Headquarters: Main Interior Building Washington, D.C.
- Employees: 5,425
- Annual budget: $1.17 billion
- Agency executives: Aubrey Bettencourt (Acting), Commissioner; David Palumbo, Deputy Commissioner
- Parent agency: United States Department of the Interior
- Website: www.usbr.gov

The United States Bureau of Reclamation (formerly the United States Reclamation Service) is a federal agency under the United States Department of the Interior that oversees water resource management in the United States, specifically as applied to the oversight and operation of the diversion, delivery, and storage projects that it has built throughout the western United States for irrigation, water supply, and attendant hydroelectric power generation. It is currently the U.S.'s largest wholesaler of water, bringing water to more than 31 million people, and providing one in five Western farmers with irrigation water for 10 million acres of farmland, which produce 60% of the nation's vegetables and 25% of its fruits and nuts. The bureau is also the second largest producer of hydroelectric power in the western U.S.

On June 17, 1902, in accordance with the Reclamation Act, Secretary of the Interior Ethan Allen Hitchcock established the U.S. Reclamation Service within the U.S. Geological Survey (USGS). The new Reclamation Service studied potential water development projects in each western state with federal lands. Revenue from sale of federal lands was the initial source of the program's funding. Because Texas had no federal lands, it did not become a Reclamation state until 1906, when Congress passed a law including it in the provisions of the Reclamation Act.

== History ==
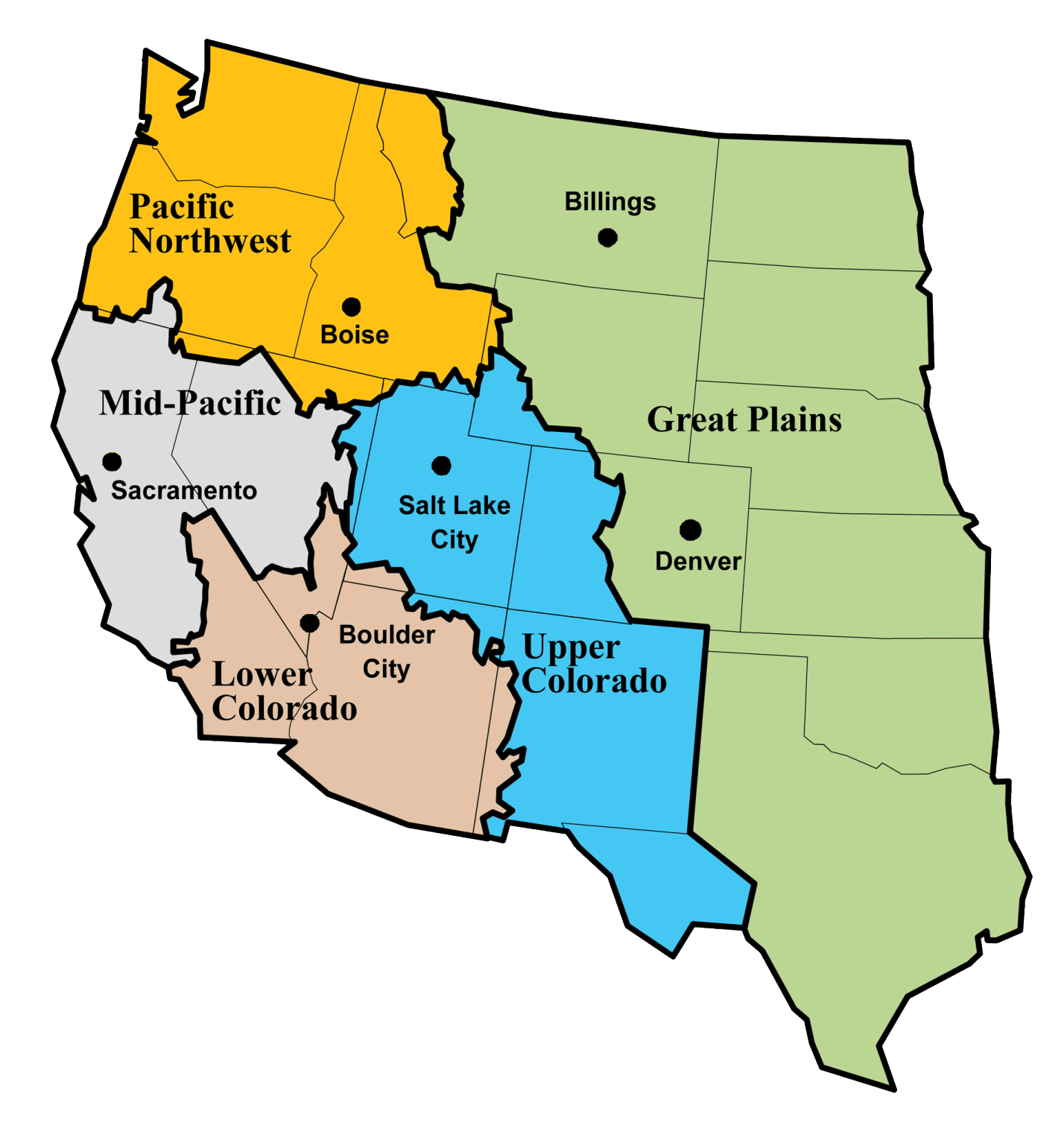
Bureau of Reclamation regions

From 1902 to 1907, Reclamation began about 30 projects in Western states. Then, in 1907, the Secretary of the Interior separated the Reclamation Service from the USGS and created an independent bureau within the Department of the Interior. Frederick Haynes Newell was appointed the first director of the new bureau. Beginning with the third person to take over the direction of Reclamation in 1923, David W. Davis, the title was changed from Director to Commissioner.

In the early years, many projects encountered problems: lands or soils included in projects were unsuitable for irrigation; land speculation sometimes resulted in poor settlement patterns; proposed repayment schedules could not be met by irrigators who had high land-preparation and facilities-construction costs; settlers were inexperienced in irrigation farming; waterlogging of irrigable lands required expensive drainage projects; and projects were built in areas which could only grow low-value crops. In 1923 the agency was renamed the "Bureau of Reclamation". In 1924, however, in the face of increasing settler unrest and financial woes, the "Fact Finder's Report" spotlighted major problematic issues; the Fact Finders Act in late 1924 sought to resolve some of these problems.

In 1928 Congress authorized the Boulder Canyon (Hoover Dam) Project, and large appropriations began, for the first time, to flow to Reclamation from the general funds of the United States. The authorization came only after a hard-fought debate about the pros and cons of public power versus private power.

The heyday of Reclamation construction of water facilities occurred during the Depression and the 35 years after World War II. From 1941 to 1947, Civilian Public Service labor was used to carry on projects otherwise interrupted by the war effort. The last major authorization for construction projects occurred in the late 1960s, while a parallel evolution and development of the American environmental movement began to result in strong opposition to water development projects. Even the 1976 failure of Teton Dam as it filled for the first time did not diminish Reclamation's strong international reputation in water development circles. However, this first and only failure of a major Reclamation Bureau dam led to subsequent strengthening of its dam-safety program to avoid similar problems. Even so, the failure of Teton Dam, the environmental movement, and the announcement of President Carter's "hit list" on water projects profoundly affected the direction of Reclamation's programs and activities.

Reclamation operates about 180 projects in the 17 western states. The total Reclamation investment for completed project facilities in September 1992 was about $11 billion. Reclamation projects provide agricultural, household, and industrial water to about one‑third of the population of the American West. About 5% of the land area of the West is irrigated, and Reclamation provides water to about one-fifth of that area, some 9,120,000 acres (37,000 km^{2}) in 1992. Reclamation is a major American generator of electricity. As of 2007, Reclamation had 58 power plants on‑line and generated 125,000 GJ of electricity.

From 1988 to 1994, Reclamation underwent major reorganization as construction on projects authorized in the 1960s and earlier drew to an end. Reclamation wrote that "The arid West essentially has been reclaimed. The major rivers have been harnessed and facilities are in place or are being completed to meet the most pressing current water demands and those of the immediate future". Emphasis in Reclamation programs shifted from construction to operation and maintenance of existing facilities. Reclamation's redefined official mission is to "manage, develop, and protect water and related resources in an environmentally and economically sound manner in the interest of the American public". In redirecting its programs and responsibilities, Reclamation substantially reduced its staff levels and budgets but remains a significant federal agency in the West.

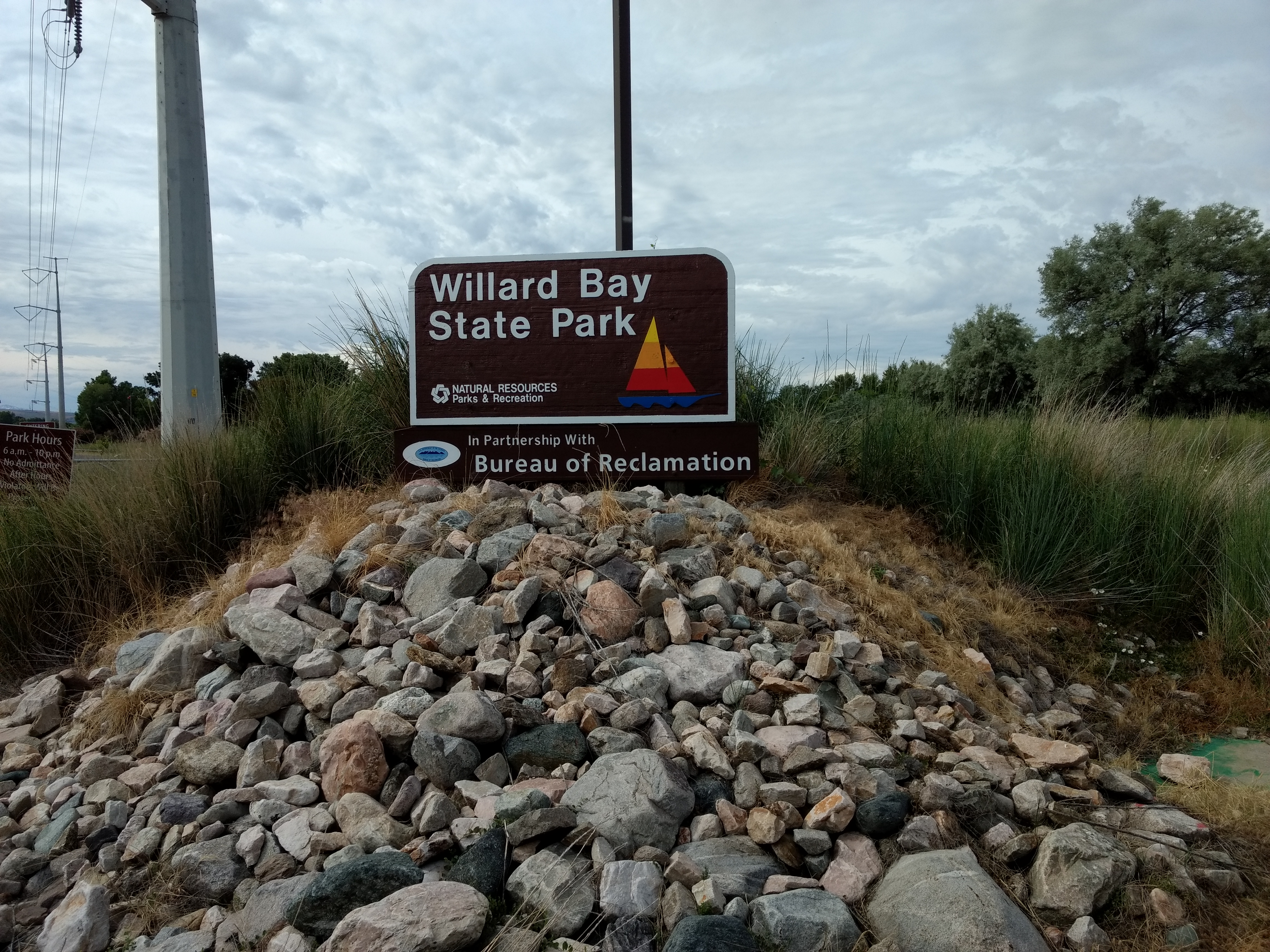

On October 1, 2017, the Hoover Dam Police Department was closed and the National Park Service took over law enforcement duties for the Hoover Dam. The Hoover Dam Police Department existed for more than 80 years.

== Leadership ==
Reclamation commissioners that have had a strong impact and molding of the Bureau have included Elwood Mead, Michael W. Straus, and Floyd Dominy, with the latter two being public-power boosters who ran the Bureau during its heyday. Mead guided the bureau during the development, planning, and construction of the Hoover Dam, the United States' first multiple-purpose dam.

John W. Keys, the 16th commissioner of the Bureau of Reclamation who served from July 2001 to April 2006, was killed two years after his retirement on May 30, 2008, when the airplane he was piloting crashed in Canyonlands National Park, Utah.

On June 26, 2017, President Donald Trump nominated Brenda Burman to serve as the commissioner of the United States Bureau of Reclamation. She was confirmed by the United States Senate on November 16, 2017. Burman is the first woman to ever lead the Bureau of Reclamation. David Murillo was serving as the acting commissioner of the bureau. Burman resigned on January 20 after the inauguration of the Biden administration.

The current commissioner is Camille Calimlim Touton, the first Filipino American to head the agency. She was confirmed by the United States Senate on November 4, 2021.

=== List of commissioners ===
The following is a list of commissioners since 1902:

No.	Image	Commissioner	Start	End	Notes
United States Reclamation Service
1		Frederick Haynes Newell	March 9, 1907	December 9. 1914	
2		Arthur Powell Davis	December 10, 1914	June 18, 1923	
United States Bureau of Reclamation
3		David W. Davis	July 1, 1923	April 2, 1924	
4		Elwood Mead	1924	January 26, 1936 (Note: Died in office)	
acting (Note: Acting at various times between 1930 and 1936)		Mae Schnurr	1930	1936	
5		John C. Page	January 25, 1937	August 2, 1943	
6		Harry W. Bashore	August 3, 1943	1945	
7		Michael W. Straus	1945	1953	
acting		Goodrich W. Lineweaver	1953	1953	
8		Wilbur A. Dexheimer	1953	1959	
9		Floyd E. Dominy	May 1, 1959	1969	
10		Ellis L. Armstrong	1969	1973	
11		Gilbert G. Stamm	1973	1977	
acting		Donald D. Anderson	1977	1977	
12		R. Keith Higginson	1977	1981	
acting		Clifford I. Barrett	1981	1981	
13		Robert N. Broadbent	1981	1984	
acting		Robert A. Olson	December 1984	August 1985	
acting		Clifford I. Barrett	1985	1985	
14		C. Dale Duvall	December 1985	July 6, 1989	
acting		Joe D. Hall	1989	1989	
15		Dennis B. Underwood	November 14, 1989	1993	
acting		Lawrence F. Hancock	1993	1993	
16		Daniel P. Beard	May 1993	September 1, 1995	
acting		Stephen V. Magnussen	September 2, 1995	December 1995	
17		Eluid Martinez	December 1995	January 2001	
acting		J. William McDonald	January 2001	July 15, 2001	
18		John W. Keys	July 17, 2001	April 15, 2006	
acting		William Rinne	April 16, 2006	October 2006	
20		Robert (Bob) W. Johnson	October 2006	January 2009	
acting		J. William McDonald	January 2009	May 2009	
21		Michael L. Connor	June 2009	February 28, 2014	
acting		Lowell Pimley	March 5, 2014	October 1, 2014	
acting		Estevan López	October 2, 2014	December 17, 2014	
22		Estevan López	December 18, 2014	January 20, 2017	
–		David Murillo	January 20, 2017	November 15, 2017	
23		Brenda Burman	November 16, 2017	January 20, 2021	
24		M. Camille Calimlim Touton	December 15, 2021	January 20, 2025	
acting		David Palumbo	January 20, 2025	October 1, 2025	
acting		Scott J. Cameron	October 1, 2025	June 9, 2026	
acting		Aubrey Bettencourt	June 9, 2026	Present	

Table notes:

== List of reclamation projects ==
- Animas-La Plata Water Project
- Boise Project
- Boulder Canyon Project
- Central Arizona Project Aqueduct
- Central Utah Project
- Central Valley Project
- Colorado-Big Thompson Project
- Colorado River Storage Project
- Columbia Basin Project
- Elwha River Dam Removal Project
- Fryingpan-Arkansas Project
- Gila Project
- High Plains Cooperative Pilot Project
- Huntley Project
- Klamath Project
- Minidoka Project
- Moon Lake Project
- Navajo-Gallup Water Supply Project
- North Platte Project
- Palo Verde Diversion Project
- Pojoaque Basin Regional Water System Project
- Project Skywater
- Rio Grande Project
- Shoshone Project
- Sierra Cooperative Pilot Project
- Strawberry Valley Project
- Washita Basin Project
- Yakima Project
- Yuma Auxiliary Project
- Yuma Project

== See also ==
- Colorado River Aqueduct
- Desert Terminal Lakes Program
- List of United States Bureau of Reclamation dams
- Refuge Water Supply Program
- Riverside Canal (El Paso)
- Yuma Valley Railway, a predecessor of the Yuma Valley Railroad that was owned by USG along Colorado River in Yuma, Arizona
- Bureau of Reclamation Security Response Force
