= U.S. Department of Commerce Office of Security =

Government office

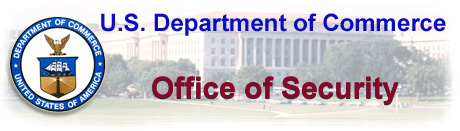
- Logo

Agency overview
- Jurisdiction: United States
- Headquarters: Herbert C. Hoover Building 1401 Constitution Avenue NW Washington, D.C., U.S.
- Motto: 'Working Together to Make the Department of Commerce a More Secure Environment for All'
- Agency executives: Nicholas M. Schnare, Deputy Assistant Secretary for Security; Harold L. Washington Jr., Deputy Director for Security
- Parent agency: U.S. Department of Commerce
- Website: commerce.gov/osy

The US Department of Commerce Office of Security is a division of the United States Department of Commerce (DOC) that works to provide security services for facilities of the department.

== Mission ==
The Mission of the US DOC Office of Security is as stated:

"The Office of Security protects personnel, facilities and information by collaborating with key leaders, decision-makers, and stakeholders across all operating units to effectively mitigate security risks throughout the Department of Commerce."

Its aim is to provide policies, programs, and oversight as it collaborates with facility managers to mitigate terrorism risks to DOC personnel and facilities, program managers to mitigate espionage risks to DOC personnel, information, and facilities, and Department and Bureau leadership to increase emergency preparedness for DOC operations.

== Structure ==
The US DOC Office of Security is an operating unit of the Chief Financial Officer and Assistant Secretary for Administration, which is itself a part of the Office of the Secretary of the US Department of Commerce.

The US DOC Office of Security is partitioned into six Divisions, which are each run by an assistant director and are responsible for individual programs:

- Project and Administrative Management Division – Kevin Sadler, assistant director
  - Admin/Finance Program
  - Strategic Operations Program
- Information and Personnel Security Division – Tonya Fields, assistant director
  - Information and Industrial Security Program
  - Personnel Security Program
- Security and Emergency Management Division – Nicholas Schnare, assistant director
  - Continuity Program
  - EOC Operations Program
  - HCHB Security Program
  - Occupant Emergency Plan Program
- Plans, Programs and Compliance Division – Michael Harmon, assistant director
  - HSPD-12 Program
  - Physical Security Program
  - Overseas Security Program
- Client Security Services Division – Nicholas Schnare, acting assistant director
  - FirstNet, Office of Security – director of security, Richard Zerillo
  - BEA, Office of Security – security manager, Victor Aqueche
  - BIS, Office of Security – security manager, VACANT
  - ITA, Office of Security – security manager, Kevin Michael
  - NOAA, Office of Security – security manager, Jeffrey Jones
    - ERSO, Danika M. Hughes
    - WRSO, Cheryl Wiser
  - Census, Office of Security – deputy director of security, Robert Drew
    - NPC RSO, Lori Carpenter
  - NIST, Office of Security – director of security, Craig Trumpet
    - SSO, Matthew Snyder
    - PSG Chief of Police, Eric Perez

== Key Programs ==
=== Physical Security Program ===
Physical Security Program staff develop a comprehensive physical security program to protect the agency's facility, property, information, and personnel assets in accordance with Federal standards and regulations; evaluate and certify risk assessment surveys; prioritize the physical security effort; and recommend funding for countermeasures.

=== Overseas Security ===
Overseas Security Program staff manage the program to deliver services to the United States and Foreign Commercial Service; and with the Department of State, coordinate the provisions of all State-Commerce security agreements.

=== Information Security Program ===
Information Security Program staff develop, coordinate, and disseminate all Departmental policies relating to the handling and protection of classified information; manage the department's program that provides for the protection of classified national security in accordance with E.O. 12958, as amended, Intelligence Community Directives, and other applicable laws, E.O.s, directives, and regulations; develop professional standards and comprehensive security education and awareness program activities to enhance employee knowledge of security requirements, including personal protection, hostile intelligence threats, proper management of classified and sensitive information, and means of countering threats to Departmental facilities and personnel; and manage the Departmental Secure Telecommunications Program.

=== Personnel Security Program ===
Personnel Security Program staff receive and process requests for personnel security clearances for job applicants, employees, and other individuals requiring access to classified national security information at any department location worldwide; request investigations for security clearances in accordance with E.O. 10450, as amended, E.O. 12968 and 5 CFR Chapter 1, Parts 731, 732, and 736; review and determine the status of cases involving the evaluation of adverse information in connection with the issuance of certificates of security clearance, the imposition of security restrictions on individuals, and other decisions affecting security clearances; take action, as appropriate, on withholding or withdrawing the security clearance of job applicants, employees, contractors, grantees, or other individuals, and, for employees, recommend action under the provisions of 5 U.S.C. §§ 7312 and 7531-32 and E.O.s 12968 and 10450, as amended; as requested by responsible Department officials, assist in the verification, review and evaluation of adverse information concerning Department employees, job applicants, and other individuals for the purpose of making suitability determinations (in accordance with 5 CFR Part 731 and other regulations promulgated pursuant to 5 U.S.C. § 301); and review, evaluate, and take appropriate action under the provisions of E.O. 10450, as amended, and E.O. 12968, with regard to any notifications of investigation of employee misconduct received by the director from the Office of Inspector General. Program staff administer the provisions of the National Industrial Security Program as set forth in the National Industrial Security Program Operations Manual (NISPOM). Program staff also maintain liaison with operating unit and bureau program managers and the Defense Security Service in order to provide appropriate input and response required to maintain the NISPOM.

=== Continuity Program ===
The Continuity Program staff manages the Departmental continuity programs consisting of the Continuity of Government (COG) and the Continuity of Operations (COOP) programs.

These programs are managed in accordance with Homeland Security Presidential Directive 20 and the appropriate Federal Continuity Directives. Through tests, training and exercises, the staff effectively plans for controls and evaluates all interagency level exercises for these programs, in accordance with the National Exercise Program.

Additionally they oversee the involvement of the department's leadership in interagency senior level exercises (e.g., TOPOFF).

=== Emergency Preparedness Program ===
The Emergency Preparedness Program staff manages the Departmental Emergency Operations Center and the overall Occupant Emergency Program for the department and the specific Occupant Emergency Plan for the Herbert C. Hoover Building (HCHB).

Through tests, training and exercises the staff effectively plans for, controls and evaluates all interagency-level exercises for the above programs, in accordance with the National Exercise Program.

=== Field Security Offices ===
The field security offices shall be responsible for providing security oversight to operating units; coordinating searches, evacuations, and other procedures to protect persons, property and information; overseeing the emergency responses and investigations of security incidents at all Departmental facilities; developing, implementing, and maintaining a program of reviews throughout the department to ensure appropriate compliance with all security policies promulgated by OSY; conducting a comprehensive security education and awareness program to enhance employee knowledge of security requirements; facilitating requests for personnel security clearances for job applicants, employees, and other individuals requiring access to classified national security information at any department location worldwide; and reviewing suitability investigations for contractors of the department.
