= Naval Intelligence Activity =

Government agency information for the Naval Intelligence Activity organization

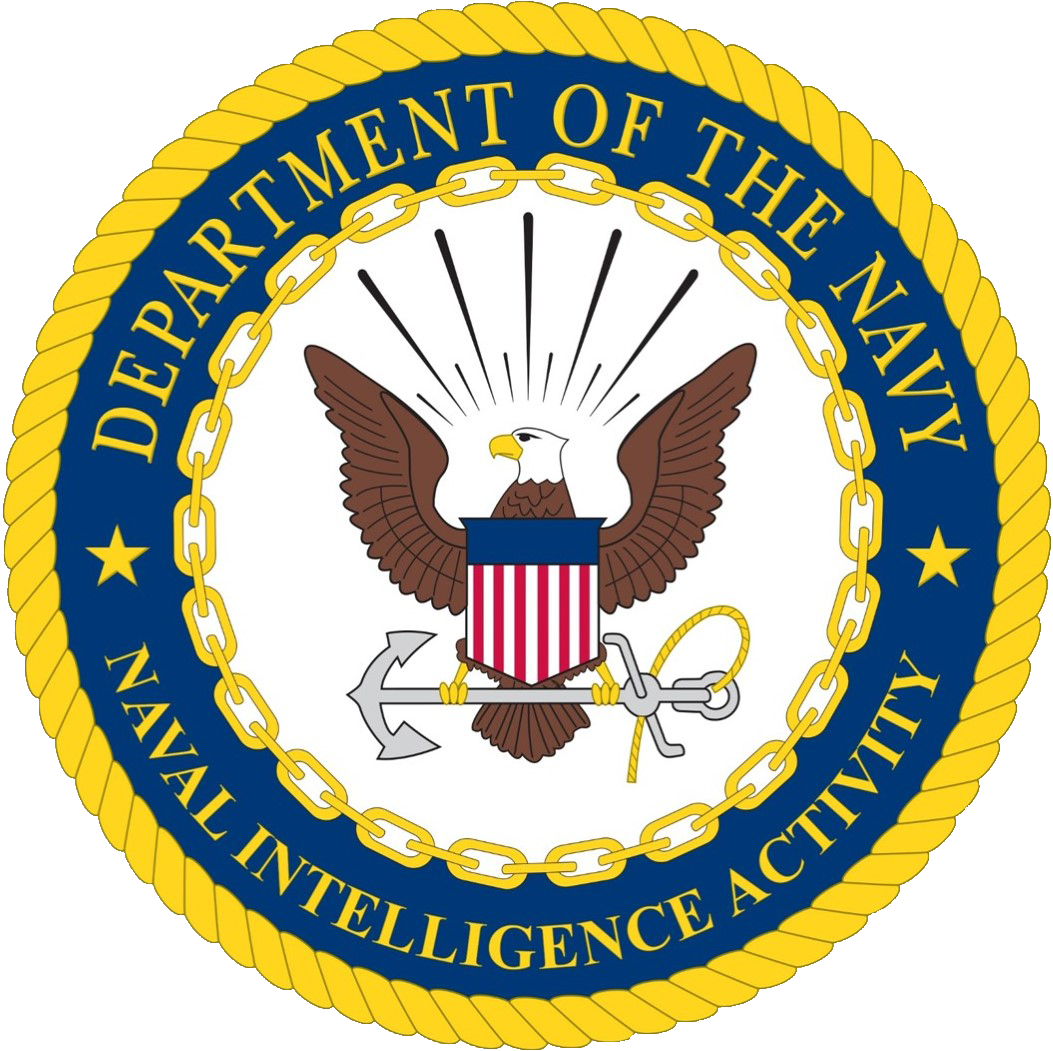
- Seal of the Naval Intelligence Activity

Agency overview
- Formed: October 1, 2014; 11 years ago
- Headquarters: The Pentagon, Washington D.C.
- Agency executives: Steve Parode, Director; Sandra Brown, Deputy Director
- Parent agency: United States Navy

The Naval Intelligence Activity (NIA) is an Echelon II shore activity and Budget Submitting Office (BSO) of the United States Navy. It is headquartered at the Pentagon in Washington, D.C. and reports to the Chief of Naval Operations (CNO) through the Director of Naval Intelligence/Deputy Chief of Naval Operations for Information Warfare (OPNAV N2N6). NIA serves as the immediate superior in charge (ISIC) to the Office of Naval Intelligence (ONI), an Echelon III command that serves as the Navy's Service Intelligence Production Center and Center of Excellence for maritime-focused intelligence products.

== History ==
NIA was founded on 1 October 2014 in order to consolidate oversight and management of activities conducted by Naval Intelligence across the globe. Naval Intelligence, whose origins date to 1882, is the oldest of the eighteen elements of the United States Intelligence Community. The Director of NIA also serves as the Deputy Director of Naval Intelligence (OPNAV N2N6C) and represents the Director at Intelligence Community and Defense Intelligence decisional bodies hosted by the Director of National Intelligence and the Undersecretary of Defense for Intelligence and Security, respectively.

== Mission ==
The mission of NIA is to direct, oversee, and manage the collection, analysis, production, and dissemination of maritime intelligence in support of Department of the Navy (DON), Department of Defense (DoD), Intelligence Community (IC), and national decision makers. Fundamental to its oversight and management functions, NIA ensures that resources are properly allocated and effectively used in the acquisition, procurement, and sustainment of intelligence systems. It is additionally tasked with synchronizing intelligence activities across the worldwide naval intelligence enterprise with other elements of the IC. As a secondary mission, NIA is tasked with providing direct support to the Director of Naval Intelligence, and other elements of the CNO's staff (OPNAV), as directed. NIA also executes the authorities of the Director of Naval Intelligence outlined in Title 10 and Title 50 of the United States Code and Executive Order 12333 that the DNI delegates for that purpose.
