= Smithsonian Institution Office of Protection Services =

Guard force of the Smithsonian Institution

- Smithsonian Institution Office of Protection Services patch
- Common name: Smithsonian Police

Jurisdictional structure
- Operations jurisdiction: United States
- Constituting instrument: United States Code, Title 40, Subtitle II, Part C, Chapter 63, Section 6306
- General nature: Civilian police
- Specialist jurisdiction: Buildings and lands occupied or explicitly controlled by the institution and the institution's personnel, and public entering the buildings and precincts of the institution

Operational structure
- Officers: 850
- Units: 3: Smithsonian Museum Protection; Smithsonian Museum Physical Security; US National Zoological Park Police

Website
- https://security.si.edu/

The Smithsonian Institution Office of Protection Services, often referred to as the Smithsonian Police, is the guard and security police force of the Smithsonian Institution.

It is a federal guard force consisting of 850 officers with special police authority tasked with protecting visitors, staff, property, and grounds of the federally owned and managed Smithsonian Institution museums and research centers in Washington, D.C., New York City, at the 2,800 acre Smithsonian Environmental Research Center in Maryland as well as oversight of the security operations at the Smithsonian Tropical Research Institute in Panama.

== History ==
According to a 1978 report by the Comptroller General of the United States:

In 1882 the Office of Public Buildings and Grounds was authorized to employ four watchmen to protect the buildings and grounds of the Smithsonian. The powers and duties of the watchmen were the same as those of the District's Metropolitan Police. Pursuant to 40 U.S.C. 193n, the Smithsonian was authorized to employ special policemen to police the buildings and grounds of the Institution. The special police were authorized to concurrently enforce, with the United States Park Police, the laws and regulations of the National Capital Parks.

== Law enforcement authority ==
According to the U.S Code (Title 40, Chapter 63, §6306), Smithsonian guards are designated as special police. National Zoo police officers are federal Law Enforcement Officers with full Law Enforcement Authority. Subsection B outlines the powers of these special officers stating that they:

(1) may, within the specified buildings and grounds, enforce, and make arrests for violations of, sections 6302 and 6303 of this title, any regulation prescribed under section 6304 of this title, federal or state law, or any regulation prescribed under federal or state law; and (2) may enforce concurrently with the United States Park Police the laws and regulations applicable to the National Capital Parks, and may make arrests for violations of sections 6302 and 6303 of this title, within the several areas located within the exterior boundaries of the face of the curb lines of the squares within which the specified buildings and grounds are located."

As a uniformed force in accordance with subsection C, employees designated as special police for the Smithsonian "may be provided, without charge, with uniforms and other equipment as may be necessary for the proper performance of their duties, including badges, revolvers, and ammunition."

The National Zoological Park Police being as a Federal Law Enforcement Agency that represents one of the five original full service police forces in the Washington District of Columbia share full police powers within the District of Columbia, in addition has a Congressional mandate in the form of a cooperative agreement with the Metropolitan Police Department of the District of Columbia to assist with law enforcement and crime prevention in a directed patrol areas in the Second, Third and Fourth Police Service areas around the National Zoological Park.

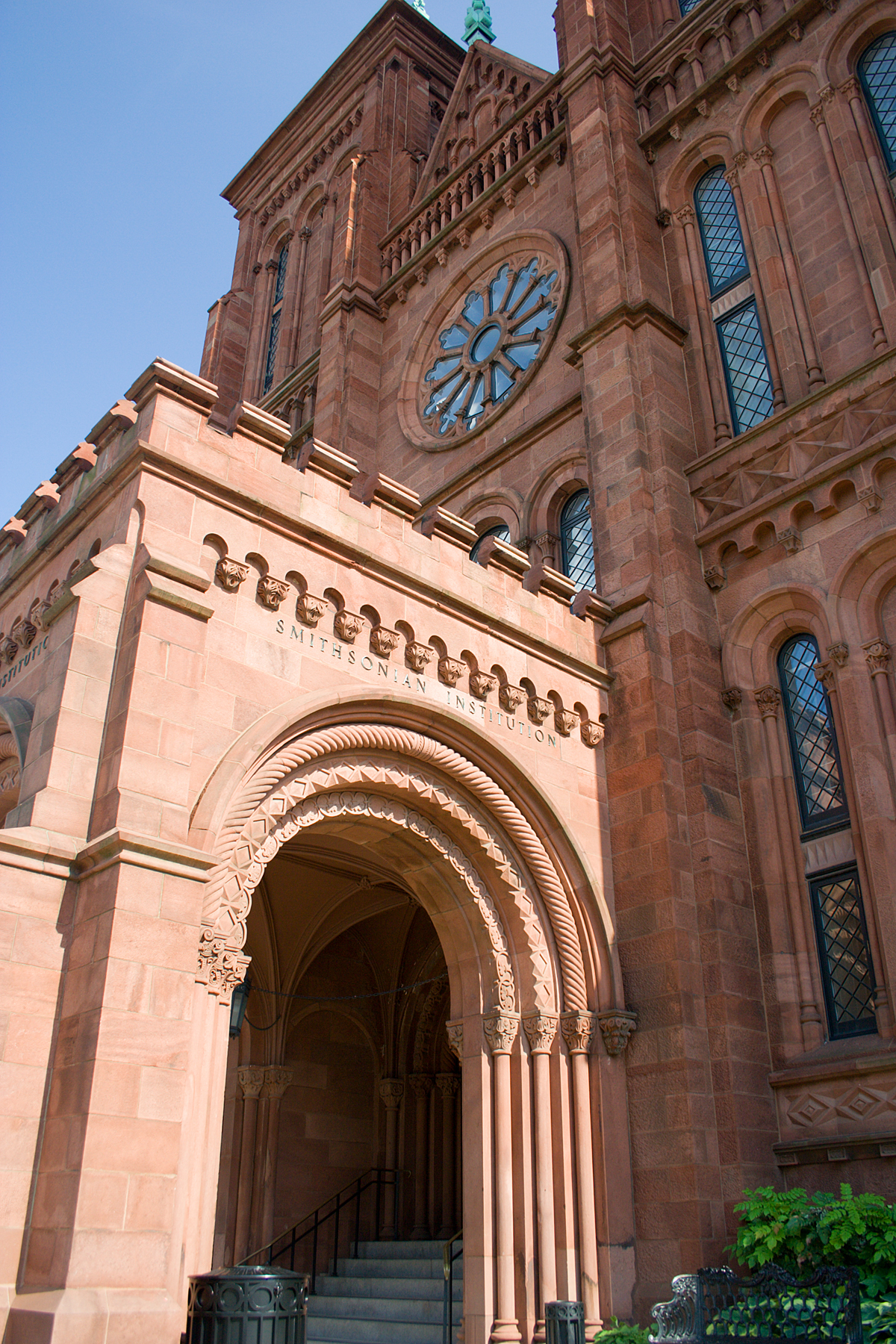
The Smithsonian Institution Office of Protection protects 19 Smithsonian sites.

== Positions ==
There are several position levels within the Office of Protection Services:

- Smithsonian Museum protection officers are designated as "special police" under the US Code (Title 40, Chapter 63, §6306) and have limited police powers. They undergo training in CPR, firearm use, arrest, handcuff procedures, and pepper spray use. They are assigned to one of nineteen Smithsonian museums or research sites in New York City, Maryland, Virginia, or the District of Columbia. There is also a specialized K-9 unit with bomb-detection dogs that patrol museum grounds. Officers utilize patrol vehicles for most sites in D.C. as well as ATV and Boats for the facility in Maryland. Officers are armed with revolvers
- Smithsonian Museum physical security specialists and Supervisory physical security specialists assist in overseeing the protection operations at individual sites.

National Zoological Park Police patch

- US National Zoological Park Police officers are specifically assigned to the National Zoo and the Smithsonian Conservation Biology Institute in Front Royal, Virginia. The National Zoological Park Police is one of the oldest police forces in the District of Columbia. According to the official National Zoo Website, the Zoological Police was one of the original five police agencies in D.C. created in 1889. The 163-acre (0.66 km^{2}) National Zoo is a Smithsonian facility in the District of Columbia and is staffed 24 hours a day by full-time US National Zoological Park police officers. The National Zoo also maintains a 3200-acre Research facility (Smithsonian Conservation Biology Institute; SCBI) in Front Royal, Virginia; which is staffed by members of the National Zoological Park Police. NZPP officers are Federal law enforcement officers and carry full law enforcement jurisdiction within the District of Columbia and Virginia that work closely with the Metropolitan Police Department and the US Park Police, as well as other federal law enforcement agencies to include Virginia Law Enforcement Authorities.

== Law Enforcement Union membership ==
Smithsonian Museum officers in New York state and District of Columbia belong to the American Federation of Government Employees (AFGE) Local 2463.

== See also ==
- United States Park Police
- List of United States federal law enforcement agencies
