= National Institutes of Health Police =

National Institutes of Health Division of Police
- NIH Logo
- Abbreviation: NIH Police or NIH DP

Jurisdictional structure
- Federal agency: United States
- Operations jurisdiction: United States
- General nature: Federal law enforcement

Operational structure
- Headquarters: Bethesda, Maryland
- Sworn members: 105 Sworn Officers
- Parent agency: National Institutes of Health

Notables
- Award: Hurricane Katrina

Website
- ors.od.nih.gov/ser/dp/about/Pages/default.aspx

In the US, the National Institutes of Health Division of Police (NIH DP) is the security police force that police and protect National Institutes of Health (NIH) people and property.

== Locations ==
The NIH in Bethesda, Maryland, consists of approximately 75 buildings that span over 300 acres of exclusive federal jurisdiction.

The NIH Police are responsible for law enforcement services at the National Cancer Institute located in Fort Detrick, Maryland, and at the Rocky Mountain Laboratories in Hamilton, Montana.

The NIH in Bethesda has the world's largest hospital dedicated to scientific research, its own power plant, water treatment plant, and Fire Department.

NIH also contains the Vaccine Research Center and C.W. Bill Young Center for Biodefense and Emerging Infectious Diseases which houses BSL 3 and BSL 4 laboratories.

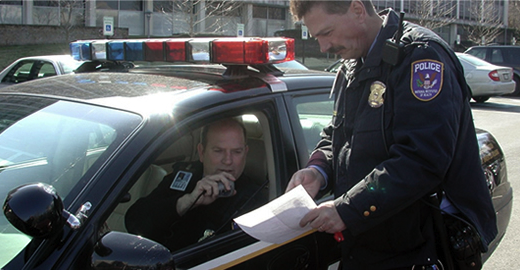
NIH Police Officers

== Structure ==
The NIH Police are an approximately 105-officer department which consists of Patrol Units, K9, Investigators, Intelligence Unit, Special Response Team, Training Division, Firearms Instructors, as well as Tactical Medical Officers.

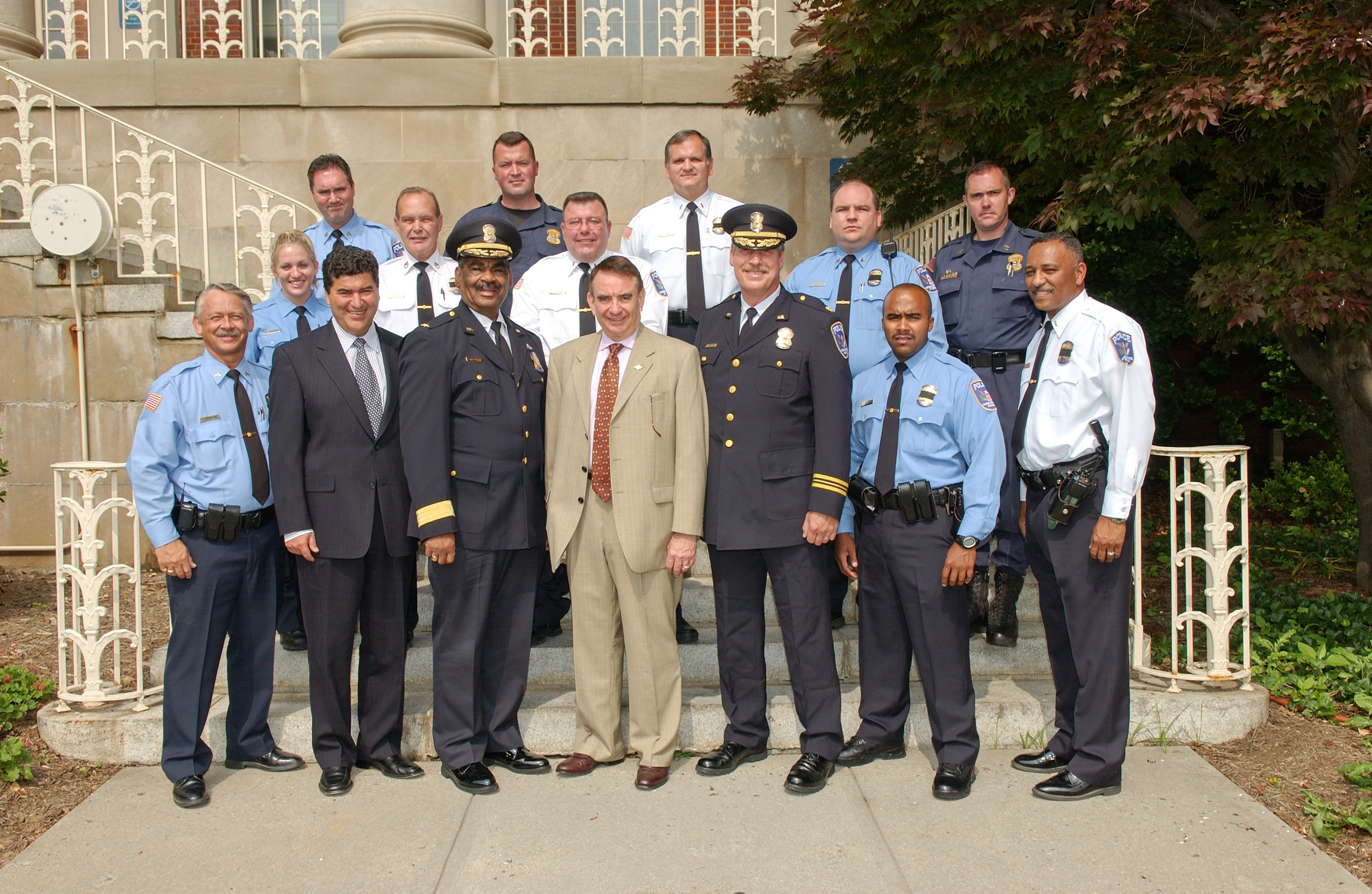
NIH Police Officers in uniform. Lieutenants and above wear white shirts, Sergeants and below wear blue shirts, and K-9 officers wear dark blue/grey uniforms.

=== Police and security ===
The NIH DP has both a Police Department and a contracted security force, known as the Guard Force Operations Branch (GFOB), which provides physical security at gates at campuses.

Security at the perimeter consists of:

- Police Officers
- Contracted Security Guards
- Security Technicians.

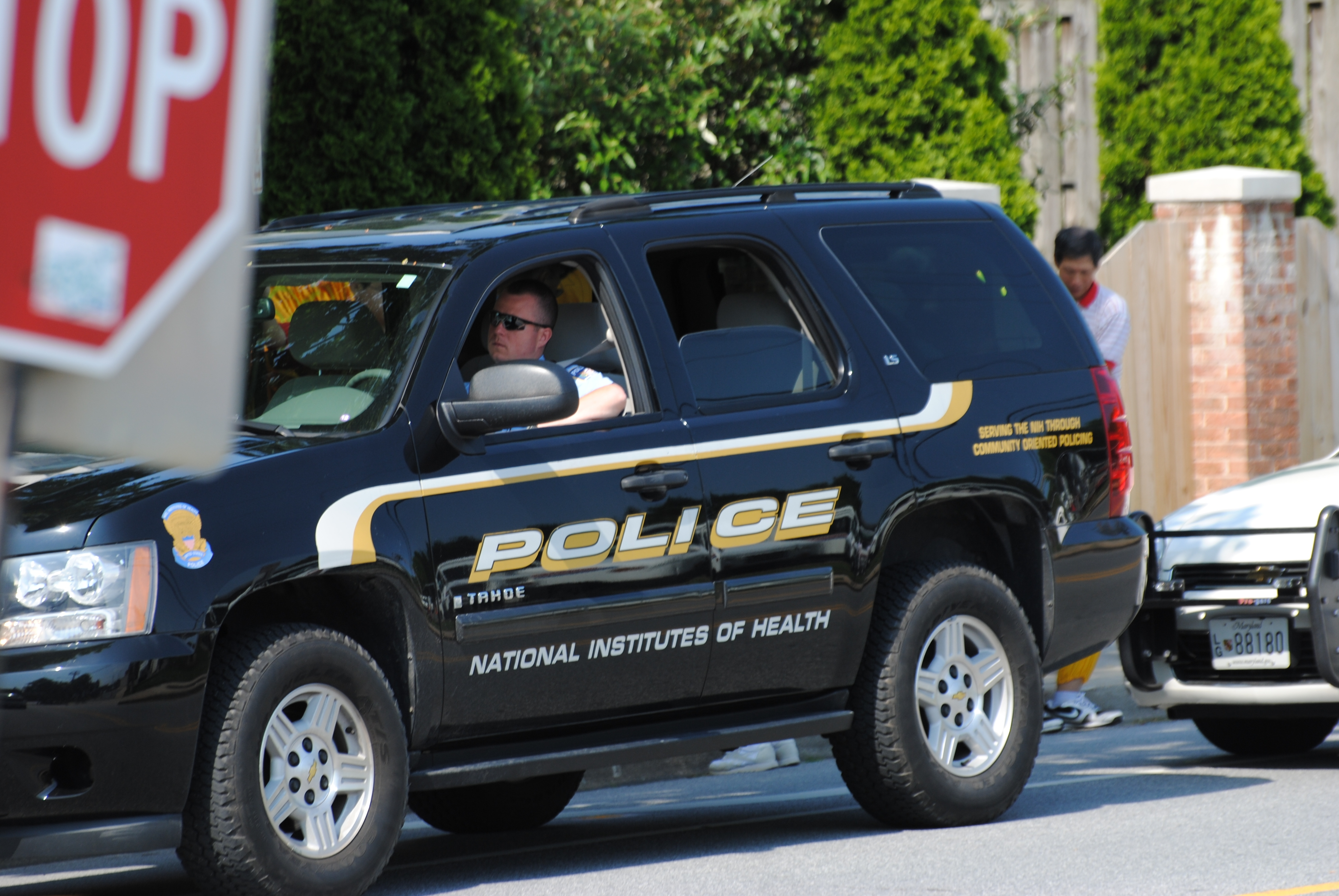
NIH Police patrol vehicle (2012)

=== Rank structure ===
The rank structure of the NIH Police is as follows:

- Patrol Officer
- Patrol Officer First Class
- Corporal
- Master Patrol Officer
- Sergeant
- Lieutenant
- Captain
- Major
- Deputy Chief
- Chief.

== Mission ==
It is the mission of the NIH Division of Police to protect the country's national treasure: scientific research, the NIH research community and to ensure that the mission of NIH is not impeded by personal attacks, loss of assets, criminal activity or acts of terrorism.

== Equipment and uniform ==
NIH Police are armed federal officers and have a variety of equipment to do their jobs.

NIH Police wear a midnight navy shirt and outer armor carrier (Officers), white shirts and outer armor carrier (Sergeants and above), midnight navy patrol duty uniform pants, and black boots. K-9 officers wear blue BDU-style uniform and baseball cap.

For personal equipment, NIH Police are equipped with firearms, radio, handcuffs, flashlight, OC spray and baton. They also have marked patrol vehicles fitted with lights and sirens.

Name	Country of origin	Type
SIG Sauer P320	United States	Semi-automatic pistol
Heckler & Koch MP5	Germany	Submachine gun
Heckler & Koch HK416D	Germany	Semi-automatic rifle

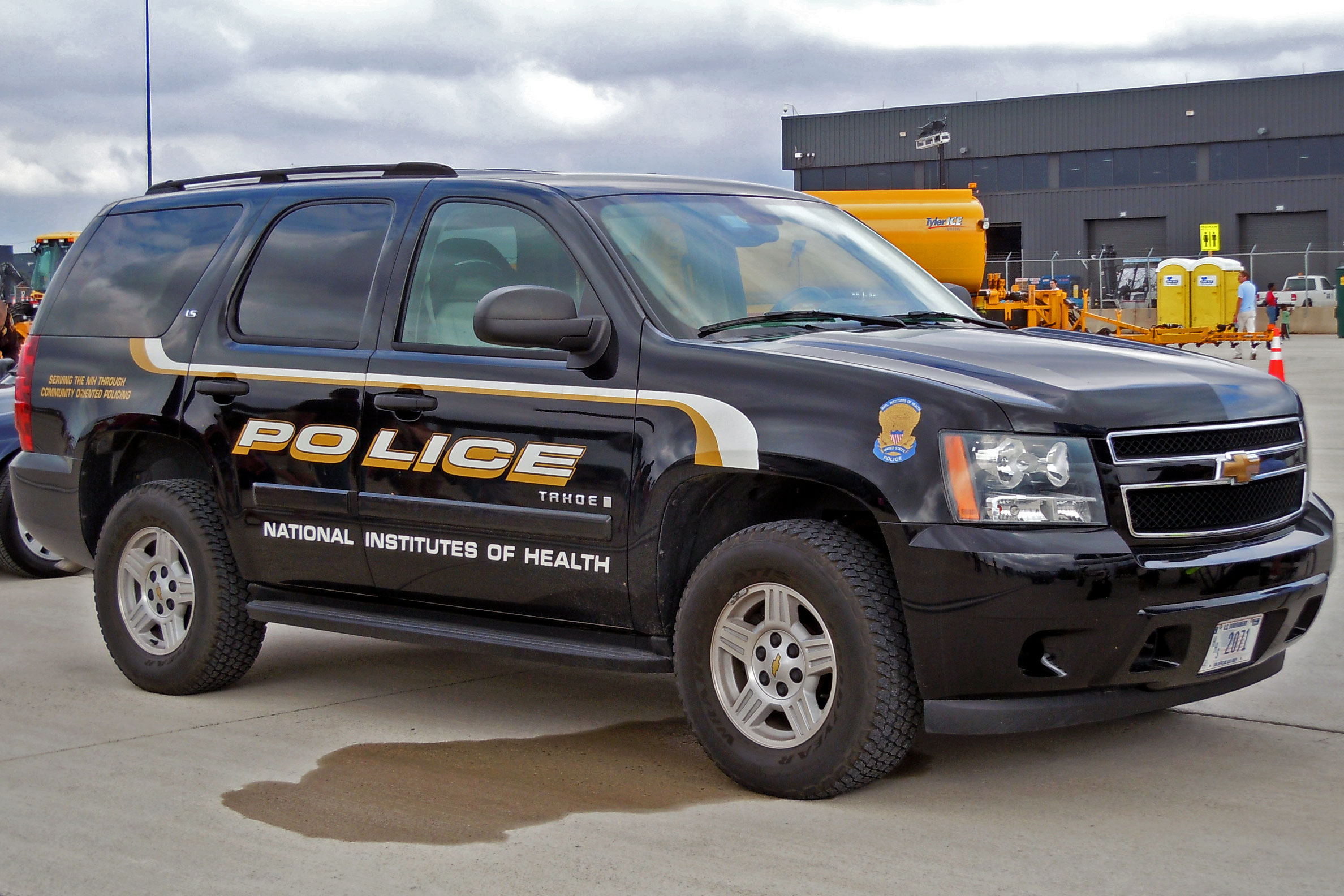
NIH Police Chevrolet Tahoe
