= National Park Service Law Enforcement Rangers =

Government agency protecting US National Parks

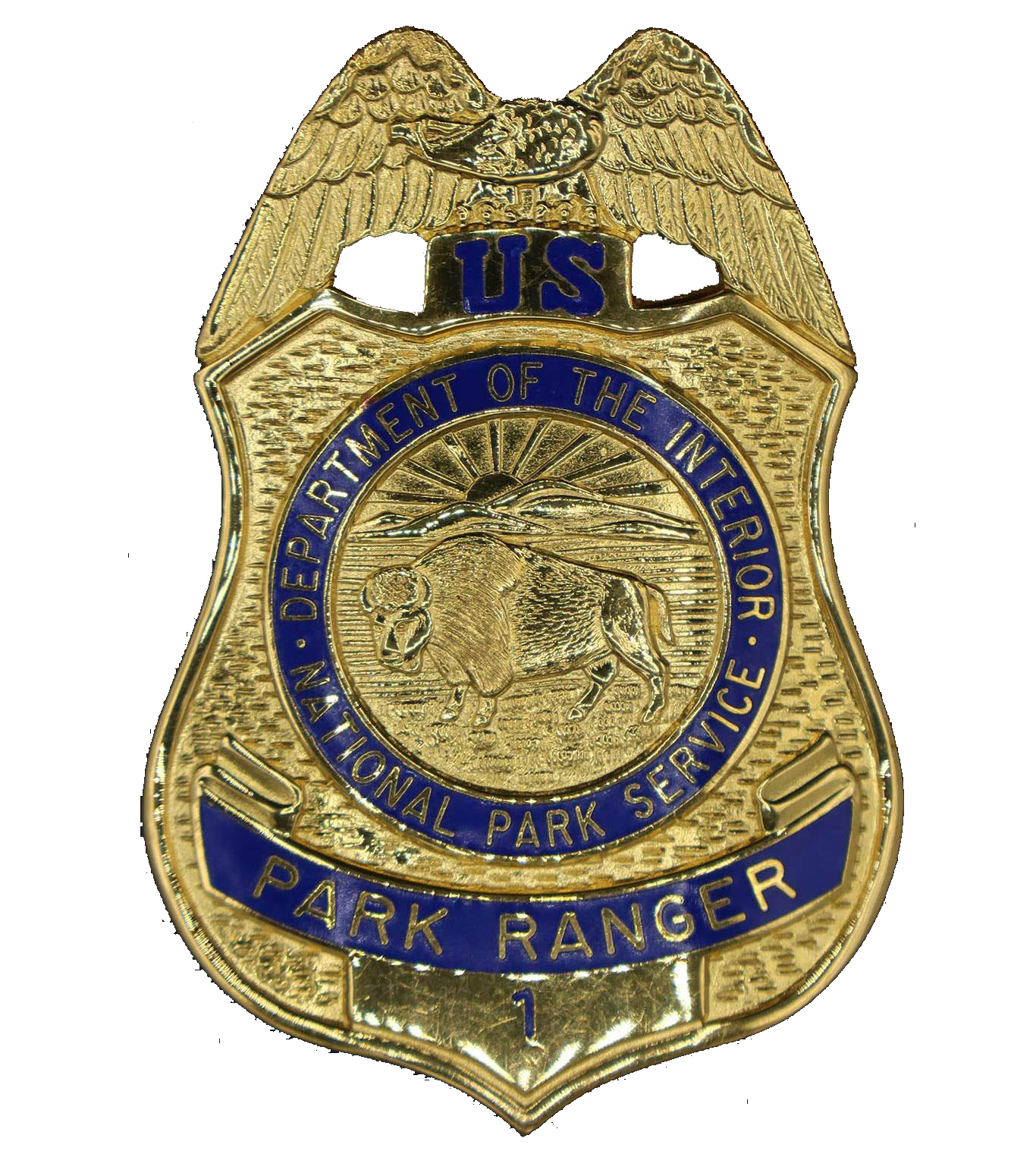
- Badge
- Common name: Law Enforcement Ranger

Agency overview
- Formed: 1916

Jurisdictional structure
- Federal agency (Operations jurisdiction): United States
- Operations jurisdiction: United States
- Legal jurisdiction: National Park Service areas
- General nature: Federal law enforcement; Civilian police
- Specialist jurisdiction: Environment, parks, heritage property

Operational structure
- Headquarters: Washington, D.C.
- Sworn members: 1,300+
- Parent agency: National Park Service
- Divisions: Investigative Services Branch

Website
- https://www.nps.gov/aboutus/become-a-law-enforcement-ranger.htm

National Park Service Law Enforcement Rangers are uniformed federal law enforcement officers with broad authority to enforce federal and state laws within the National Park Service (NPS) sites. The National Park Service commonly refers to law enforcement operations in the agency as Visitor and Resource Protection. In units of the National Park System, law enforcement rangers are the primary police agency. The National Park Service also employs special agents who conduct more complex criminal investigations. Rangers and agents receive extensive police training at the Federal Law Enforcement Training Centers and annual in-service and regular firearms training.

== Jurisdiction ==
There are several types of National Park Service jurisdiction. Jurisdiction is set by the enabling legislation for each individual unit of the NPS. Law enforcement on NPS lands with exclusive jurisdiction is solely conducted by NPS Law Enforcement Rangers or the US Park Police. Many NPS units have concurrent jurisdiction and share law enforcement authority with their state and/or local county law enforcement agencies. Some National Park Service units have proprietary or partial jurisdiction where law enforcement authority for state crimes lies solely with the state or county. Memorandums of understanding with outside law enforcement agencies and/or an NPS emergency assistance statute allow rangers to render emergency law enforcement assistance outside the national parks.

== Laws enforced ==
Generally speaking the laws enforced on NPS lands are covered in Title 36 of the Code of Federal Regulations. The NPS also enforces United States Code. Title 16 of the United States Code, Title 18 of the United States Code and Title 21 of the United States Code are enforced most commonly. In exclusive and concurrent jurisdiction, the National Park Service also has authority under the Assimilative Crimes Act, 18 U.S.C. § 13, to enforce any state law for which there is not a federal equivalent. Commissioned National Park Service employees must follow all policies outlined in DOI reference manuals and director's orders in performance of their duties.

== Law enforcement operations ==
Death Valley National Park Ranger patrol vehicles during a flood response in 2025.

As part of their law enforcement mission, law enforcement rangers carry firearms and defensive equipment, make arrests, execute search warrants, complete reports and testify in court. They establish a regular and recurring presence on a vast amount of public lands, roads, and recreation sites. The primary focus of their jobs is the protection of the parks' natural and cultural resources, protection of the hundreds of millions of annual visitors to national parks, and protection of NPS employees. To cover the vast and varied terrain under their jurisdiction, NPS employees use numerous types of vehicles, horses, aircraft, ATVs, snowmobiles, dirt bikes and boats.

The current sidearm issued to new recruits is the SIG Sauer P320. However the SIG Sauer P226, P229 and also the SIG Sauer P220 have also been used as well. In the past, NPS rangers carried 4 inch barrelled revolvers of unspecified make with .357 magnum ammunition.

=== Other duties ===
- Emergency medical services: Rangers are often certified as wilderness first responders, wilderness emergency medical technicians, and paramedics. Rangers operate ambulances and respond to medical incidents inside national parks.
- Search and rescue: Search and rescue-trained rangers help visitors with injuries or illnesses suffered in remote wilderness areas or who become stranded in technical environments like swift water and high angle rock. These rangers may be climbers, boaters, or managers of the Incident Command System.

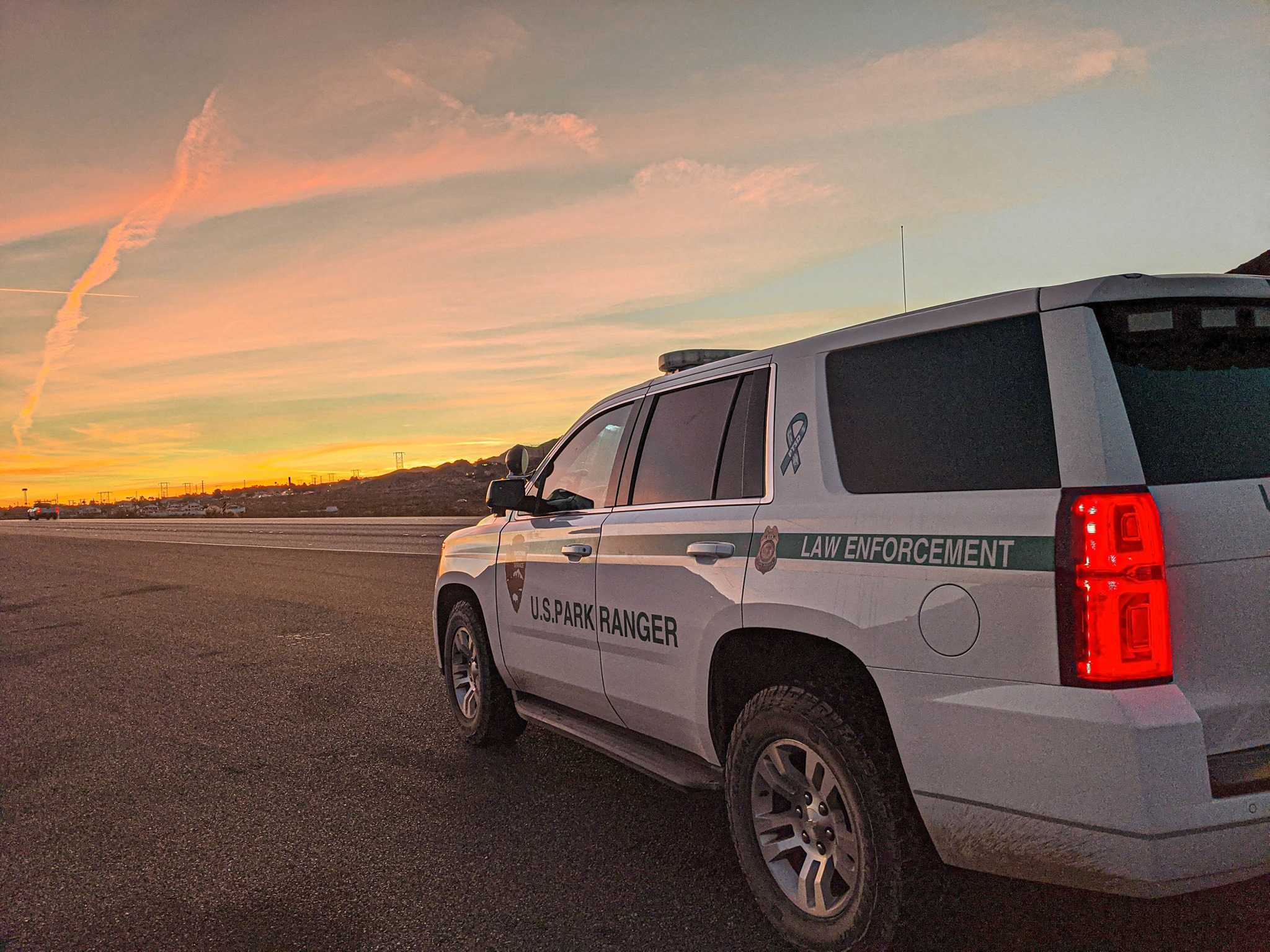
A National Park Service Chevy Tahoe at the Lake Mead National Recreation Area

=== Special agents ===
Special agents are criminal investigators who plan and conduct investigations as part of the Investigative Services Branch (ISB) concerning possible violations of criminal and administrative provisions of the NPS and other statutes under the United States Code and/or Code of Federal Regulations. Special agents can be uniformed or plain clothes officers. Special agents often carry concealed firearms, and other defensive equipment, make arrests, carry out complex criminal investigations, present cases for prosecution to U.S. attorneys, and prepare investigative reports. Special agents travel often and typically cover several NPS units and several states, and occasionally conduct internal and civil claim investigations.

== Training ==
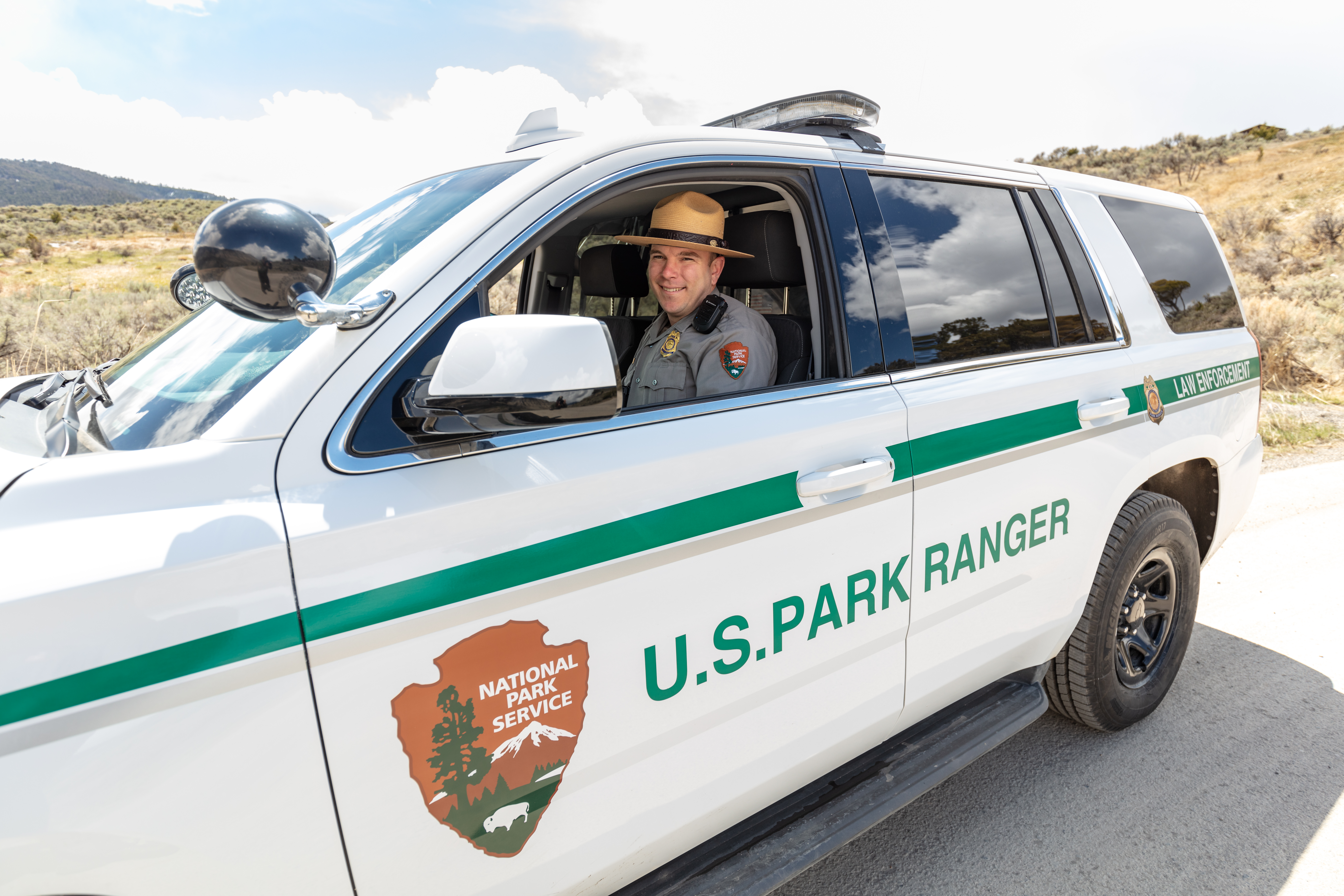
A NPS law enforcement ranger in a Chevrolet Tahoe patrol vehicle.

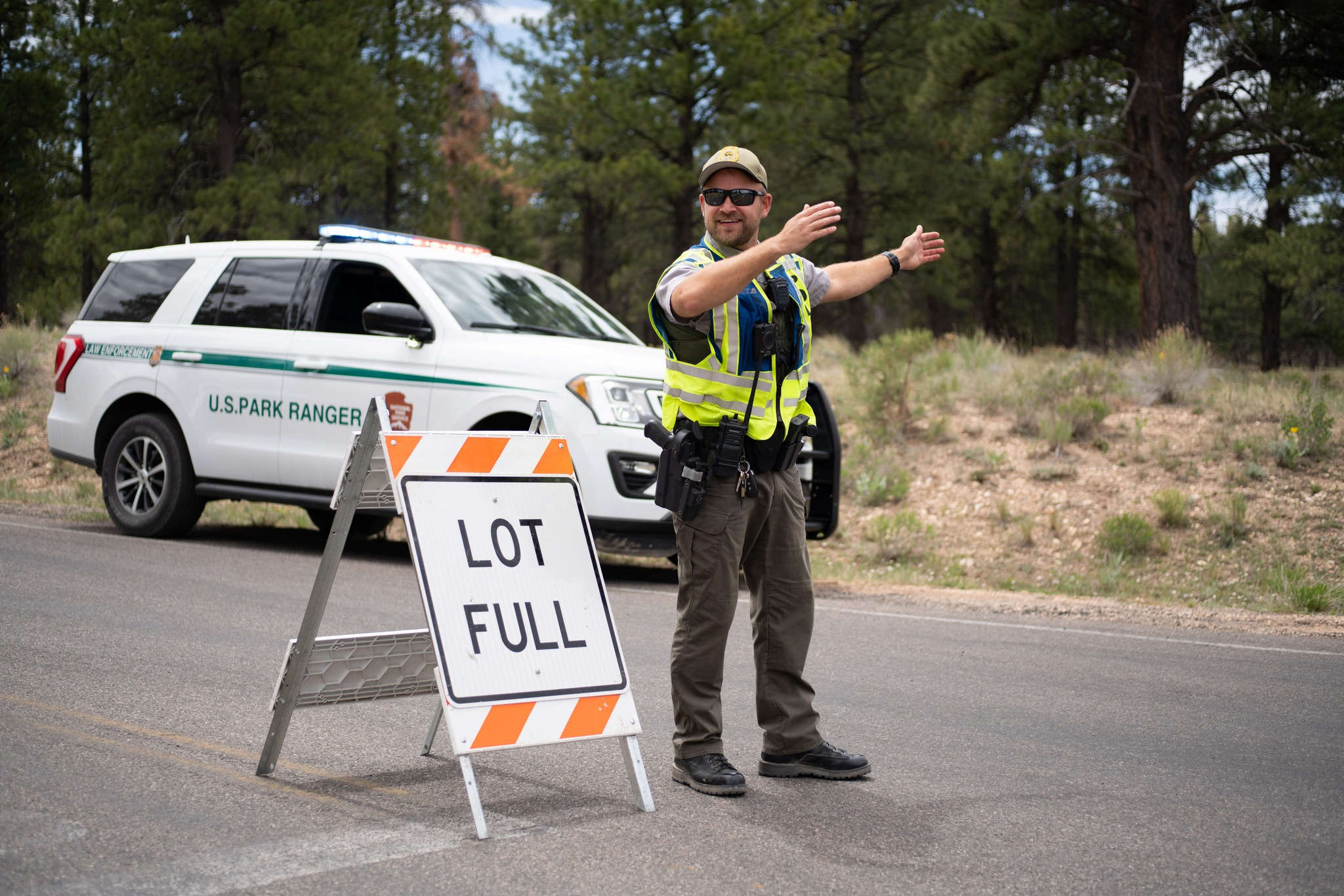
A National Park Service Law Enforcement ranger at Bryce Canyon National Park

Permanently-hired law enforcement rangers and special agents receive their training through the Federal Law Enforcement Training Center (FLETC) Brunswick, Georgia, where they attend lengthy and rigorous law enforcement training within the Land Management Police Training program (LMPT) curriculum. Once graduated, the law enforcement ranger is then assigned a field training park and upon completion returns to their duty station park. Seasonally-hired law enforcement rangers receive their training through the FLETC-accredited Park Ranger Law Enforcement Academy at six colleges throughout the country; upon transition to a permanent-hire position, they attend FLETC.

Another option is the National Park Service Basic Academy Bridge Training Program (BABT) conducted at the Horace Albright Training Center at the Grand Canyon.

The program is a five-week expedited program for qualified local, state, tribal, or federal law enforcement officers who have held a law enforcement position within the previous 3 years. Upon successful completion of the five-week program , candidates must complete the 11-week Field Training and Evaluation Program (FTEP).

== Education ==
The United States Office of Personnel Management provides the following guidance concerning education requirements for all park rangers:

Undergraduate and Graduate Education: Major study -- natural resource management, natural sciences, earth sciences, history, archeology, anthropology, park and recreation management, law enforcement/police science, social sciences, museum sciences, business administration, public administration, behavioral sciences, sociology, or other closely related subjects pertinent to the management and protection of natural and cultural resources. Course work in fields other than those specified, may be accepted if it clearly provides applicants with the background of knowledge and skills necessary for successful job performance, in the position to be filled.

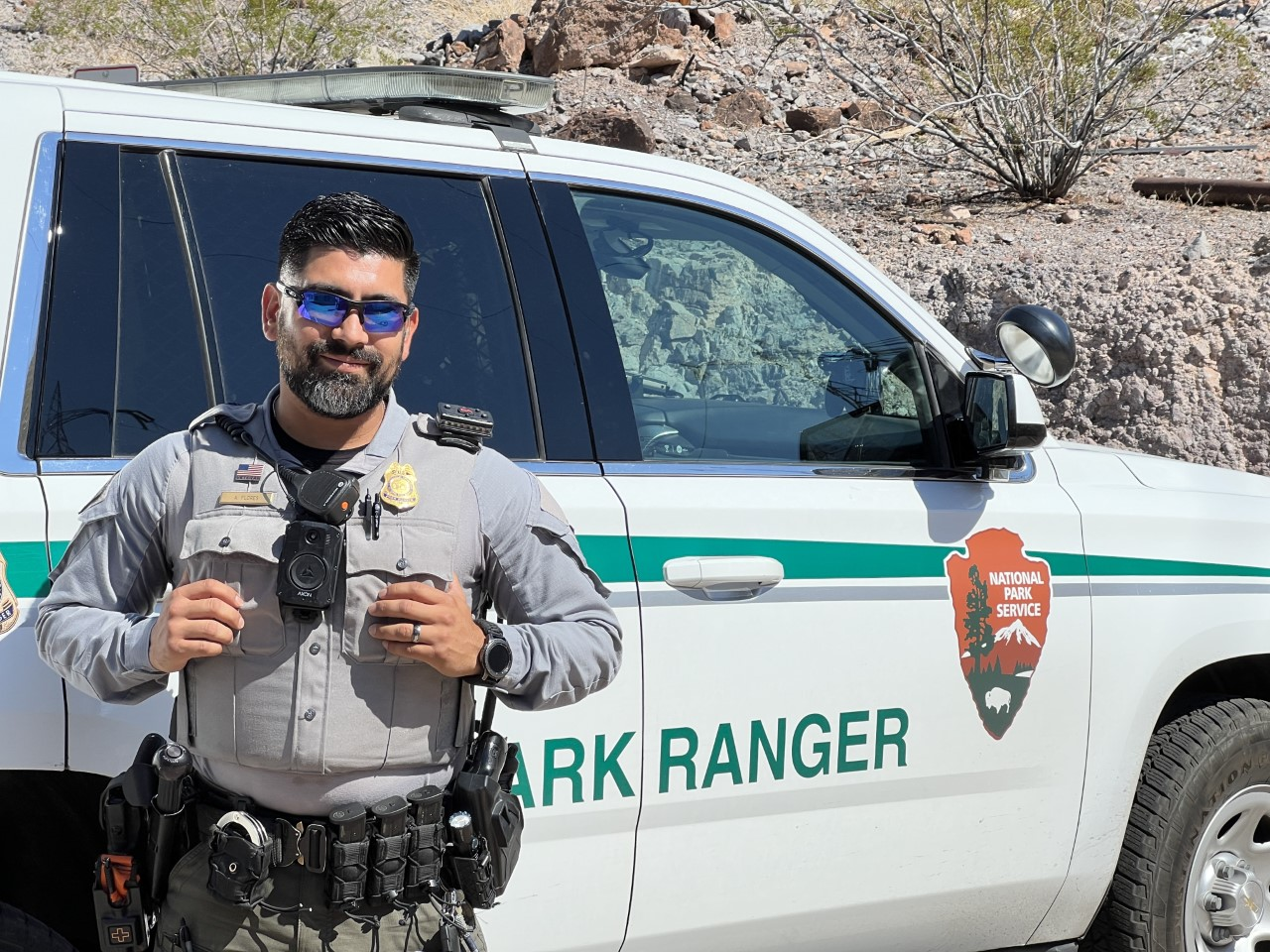
A Law Enforcement Ranger in the Lake Mead National Recreation Area

== Line of duty deaths ==
Since 1913, 41 Law Enforcement Rangers have been documented by the United States Department of the Interior to have been killed in the line of duty. According to U.S. Department of Justice statistics, National Park Service Law Enforcement Rangers suffer the highest number of felonious assaults, and the highest number of homicides of all federal law enforcement officers.

== See also ==
- Federal law enforcement in the United States
- United States Park Police
