= United States Capitol shooting incident =

United States Capitol shooting incident can refer to three different events:

- 1954 United States Capitol shooting
- 1998 United States Capitol shooting
- Killing of Ashli Babbitt

== See also ==
- Killing of Miriam Carey
- Congressional baseball game shooting
