= United States Capitol shooting =

United States Capitol shooting may refer to:

- 1954 United States Capitol shooting
- 1998 United States Capitol shooting
- Shooting of Miriam Carey (2013)
- 2017 Congressional baseball shooting
- Shooting of Ashli Babbitt (2021)
