= 2021 United States Capitol car attack =

Car attack on the U.S. Capitol Building

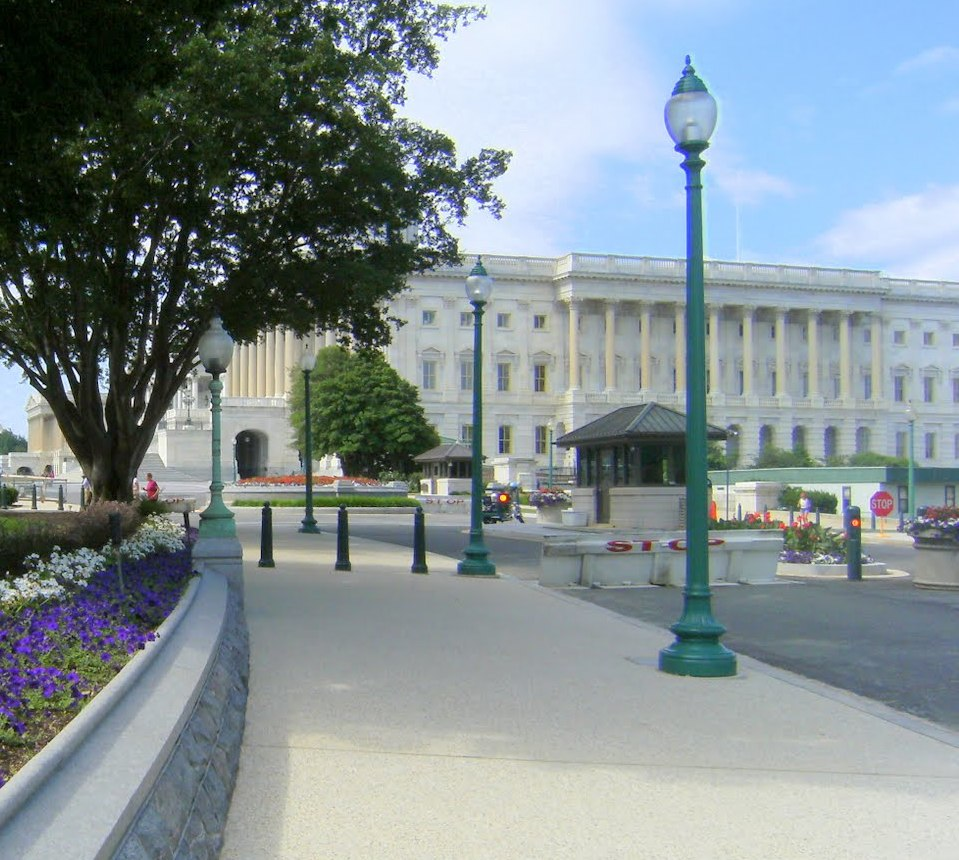
- The Capitol's Constitution Avenue checkpoint, where the attack occurred (photo taken in July 2009)

- Location: 38.8916°N 77.0083°W; United States Capitol, Washington, D.C., United States
- Date: April 2, 2021; 1:00 p.m. (EDT)
- Attack type: Vehicle-ramming attack
- Weapon: Nissan Altima And Knife
- Deaths: 2 (including the perpetrator)
- Injuries: 1
- Victim: William Evans
- Perpetrator: Noah Ricardo Green
- Motive: Black nationalism

On April 2, 2021, Noah Green, a 25-year-old Black nationalist, killed Capitol Police officer William Evans and wounded a second officer after he deliberately rammed his car into a barricade outside the United States Capitol in Washington, D.C. As a result of the attack, the Capitol complex was locked down. Green was shot and later died at a hospital from the gunshot wounds. Green shared extremist viewpoints advanced by the Nation of Islam and other black nationalists prior to committing his attack at the Capitol.

== Incident ==
On April 2, Officer Billy Evans was posted at a checkpoint on Constitution Avenue usually used by senators and staff members on weekdays, about 100 yards (91 m) from the entrance of the building on the Senate side. At about 1:00 p.m., a man deliberately crashed a blue Nissan Altima into the barricade. The vehicle struck Evans and another officer; Evans was hospitalized and died from his injuries. After ramming the two officers, the driver exited the vehicle with a knife, lunged at officers, and ignored verbal commands before being shot by police. The perpetrator was arrested, hospitalized, and died of his wounds soon afterward.

The Capitol was placed on lockdown after the attack and staff were told to shelter in place, while members of the National Guard's Immediate Reaction Force mobilized near the checkpoint. The lockdown was lifted later that day.

== Victim ==
William Francis Evans
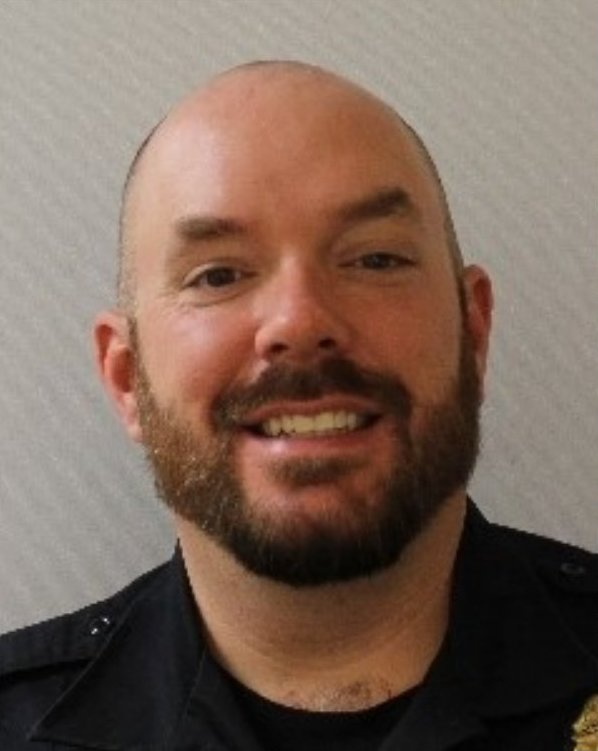
- Born: February 18, 1980; North Adams, Massachusetts, United States
- Died: April 2, 2021 (aged 41); Washington, D.C., United States
- Education: Drury High School
- Police career
- Department: United States Capitol Police
- Service years: 18

William "Billy" Evans was the Capitol Police officer killed during the attack. He served for 18 years with the United States Capitol Police, and was a member of the first responder unit. He was the sixth Capitol Police officer to die in the line of duty since the force was created in 1828.

== Perpetrator ==
=== Early life and education ===
The assailant was Noah Ricardo Green, age 25, who was born on February 8, 1996, in Fairlea, West Virginia, into a family with ten children. He grew up in Covington, Virginia, in the southwestern part of the state and graduated from Alleghany High School. In high school, he played football and participated in track and field. He attended Glenville State College before transferring to Christopher Newport University (CNU) in Newport News, Virginia, where he was a defensive back on the football team.

=== Years before the attack ===
People who knew Green described him as athletic and popular in high school and college, but after he graduated from CNU, he became deeply paranoid, leaving family and friends concerned that his mental state was unraveling. A U.S. official said Green increasingly suffered delusions, paranoia, and suicidal thoughts.

Family and friends said Green believed people had drugged him with Xanax, leaving him with addiction and withdrawal symptoms. After moving into an apartment in Newport News, he reported hallucinations, headaches, heart palpitations, and suicidal thoughts. One day, admittedly inspired by drugs, he abruptly abandoned his apartment in Newport News and moved to Indianapolis. While there, he told his brother he believed his apartment was being broken into by intruders. His brother said he appeared to be mentally disturbed.

Green also wrote in Facebook posts shortly before the attack that "these past few years have been tough, and these past few months have been tougher" and that he had quit his job "partly due to my afflictions". He posted about the end times and the Antichrist. In a March 15 post, he encouraged "everyone to study Revelations [recte Revelation], study the signs of end times, study who the best [recte beast] is, study who the anti-Christ is, study who the false prophet is, and study the created images during those times." Two days later, he made a post possibly referring to his claim of being drugged by teammates, blaming the drugging for steering him off the "right track".

Green became a follower of the Nation of Islam (NOI), a Black nationalist organization, and its leader Louis Farrakhan. On Facebook, he posted messages in support of the NOI, as well as speeches and articles by Farrakhan and his predecessor Elijah Muhammad. He petitioned to change his name to Noah Zaeem Muhammad in December 2020, but did not attend the name change hearing in Indianapolis, which was held four days before the attack. He also posted a Farrakhan video titled "the crucifixion of Michael Jackson" on March 21. In posts the week before the attack, he wrote that he believed Farrakhan had saved him "after the terrible afflictions I have suffered presumably by the CIA and FBI, government agencies of the United States of America" and claimed that "I have suffered multiple home break-ins, food poisonings, assaults, unauthorized operations in the hospital, [and] mind control."

According to his brother, a few months before the attack, Green left Indianapolis and moved to Botswana, where he told his brother that "his mind was telling him to basically commit suicide." He jumped in front of a car, seriously injuring himself, then returned to the U.S., where he moved in with his brother. Two weeks before the attack, Green posted a photo of a "Certificate of Completion" for a $1,085 donation he had made, under the name "Noah X," to the Nation of Islam's Norfolk, Virginia chapter for Saviours' Day, along with a link to a Farrakhan speech called "The Divine Destruction of America". The night before the attack, he became violently ill and texted his brother, "I'm just going to go and live and be homeless."

== Investigation ==
Investigators believe Green's attack was caused by a combination of his mental health issues and an ideological cause which he believed justified violence. He was not known to police before the attack and had no known connection to a member of Congress.

== Response ==
Acting Capitol Police chief Yogananda Pittman said the attack "has been an extremely difficult time" for her police force, especially in the aftermath of the January 6 Capitol attack.

Many members of Congress praised the actions of the Capitol Police, the National Guard, and other first responders; and they also offered condolences to the police force and the family of the slain police officer. Speaker of the House Nancy Pelosi called Evans a "martyr for democracy" and ordered the flags at the Capitol to be lowered to half-staff in his memory. She offered her condolences and support to Evans' mother and two children.

President Joe Biden said he and First Lady Jill Biden "were heartbroken to learn of the violent attack"; expressed condolences to Officer Evans' family and other bereaved; and expressed "the nation's gratitude to the Capitol Police, the National Guard Immediate Response Force, and others who quickly responded to this attack". He ordered flags lowered to half-staff at the White House and all public buildings, as a sign of respect for the service and sacrifice of Capitol Police officers.

Green's family issued a statement, saying they "were just as taken aback as the rest of the nation from this horrific event" and "feel great sympathy" for the police officers attacked. Green was "not a terrorist by any means", had "depression and potential mental illness", and "hardships with his peers" that began after repeated head trauma from playing football.

After the attack, the Nation of Islam distanced itself from Green. The group said that while Green sought to become a member of their organization, he was not a registered member of the Nation of Islam. It appears that in late summer (August–September) of 2020, he started the process to begin his study to become a member, but he did not complete the process. The group said Green's act "violates our teachings" and they "absolutely disavow this act that resulted in the senseless loss of life".

== See also ==
- 1954 United States Capitol shooting
- 1983 United States Senate bombing
- 1998 United States Capitol shooting
- Killing of Miriam Carey (2013)
