= District of Columbia Police Coordination Amendment Act of 2001 =

The District of Columbia Police Coordination Amendment Act of 2001 (Pub. L. 107–113 (text) (PDF)) is an amendment to the National Capital Revitalization and Self-Government Improvement Act of 1997. It was enacted on January 8, 2002. This act was created to fund and increase coordination between law enforcement agencies in the Washington Metropolitan Area.

== History ==
The District of Columbia Police Coordination Amendment Act of 2001 was introduced by Congresswoman Eleanor Norton on September 25, 2001. It was passed by the House of Representatives on September 25, 2001 and was passed by the Senate on December 11. The act was a response to the poor coordination between local, state and federal law enforcement agencies during the September 11 attacks.

== Agreements ==
=== National Capital Revitalization and Self-Government Improvement Act ===
The original National Capital Revitalization and Self-Government Improvement Act created agreements between the Metropolitan Police Department and several federal law enforcement agencies. The agencies that made these agreements were supposed to "assist the Department in carrying out crime prevention and law enforcement activities in the District of Columbia."
The agencies that made agreements with the Metropolitan Police Department in 1997 were:

- Amtrak
- Board of Governors of the Federal Reserve System
- Bureau of Engraving and Printing
- Defense Protective Service
- Federal Bureau of Investigation Police
- General Services Administration, National Capital Region (Federal Protective Service)
- United States Mint Police
- National Zoological Park Police

=== District of Columbia Police Coordination Amendment Act ===
In 2001 the following agencies were added:

- 11th Security Police Squadron, Bolling Air Force Base
- Bureau of Alcohol, Tobacco, Firearms and Explosives
- IRS Criminal Investigation Division
- Drug Enforcement Administration
- Bureau of Citizenship and Immigration Services
- Federal Bureau of Investigation
- Government Printing Office Police
- Library of Congress Police
- Marine Corps Law Enforcement
- Department of the Navy Police Division, Naval District Washington
- Naval Criminal Investigative Service
- United States Postal Inspection Service
- Department of State Diplomatic Security
- Supreme Court Police
- United States Army Criminal Investigation Command, Department of the Army Washington District, 3rd Military Police Group
- United States Army Military District of Washington
- United States Capitol Police
- United States Coast Guard
- United States Customs Service
- United States Marshals Service
- United States Park Police
- United States Postal Police
- United States Secret Service
- United States Secret Service Uniformed Division
