= Alexandria Fire Department =

Fire department in Alexandria, Virginia, US

Coordinates: 38°48′17″N 77°2′50″W

Operational area
- Country: United States
- State: Virginia
- City: Alexandria

Agency overview
- Established: 1866
- Annual calls: 28,520 (2026)
- Employees: 348.5 (2026)
- Staffing: Career
- Fire chief: Felipe Hernandez Jr.
- EMS level: Advanced Life Support (ALS) Transport/Basic Life Support (BLS) First Response with personnel a minimum of an Emergency Medical Technician-Basic (EMT-B)
- IAFF: 2141

Facilities and equipment
- Battalions: 2
- Stations: 10
- Engines: 9
- Trucks: 2
- Tillers: 1
- Rescues: 2
- Ambulances: 6
- HAZMAT: 3
- Fireboats: 1
- Rescue boats: 2
- Light and air: 1

Website
- Official website
- IAFF website

The Alexandria Fire Department (AFD) provides fire protection and emergency medical services to the city of Alexandria, Virginia. Established in 1866, the department is responsible for 15 square miles (39 km^{2}) with a population of over 159,000.

== History ==
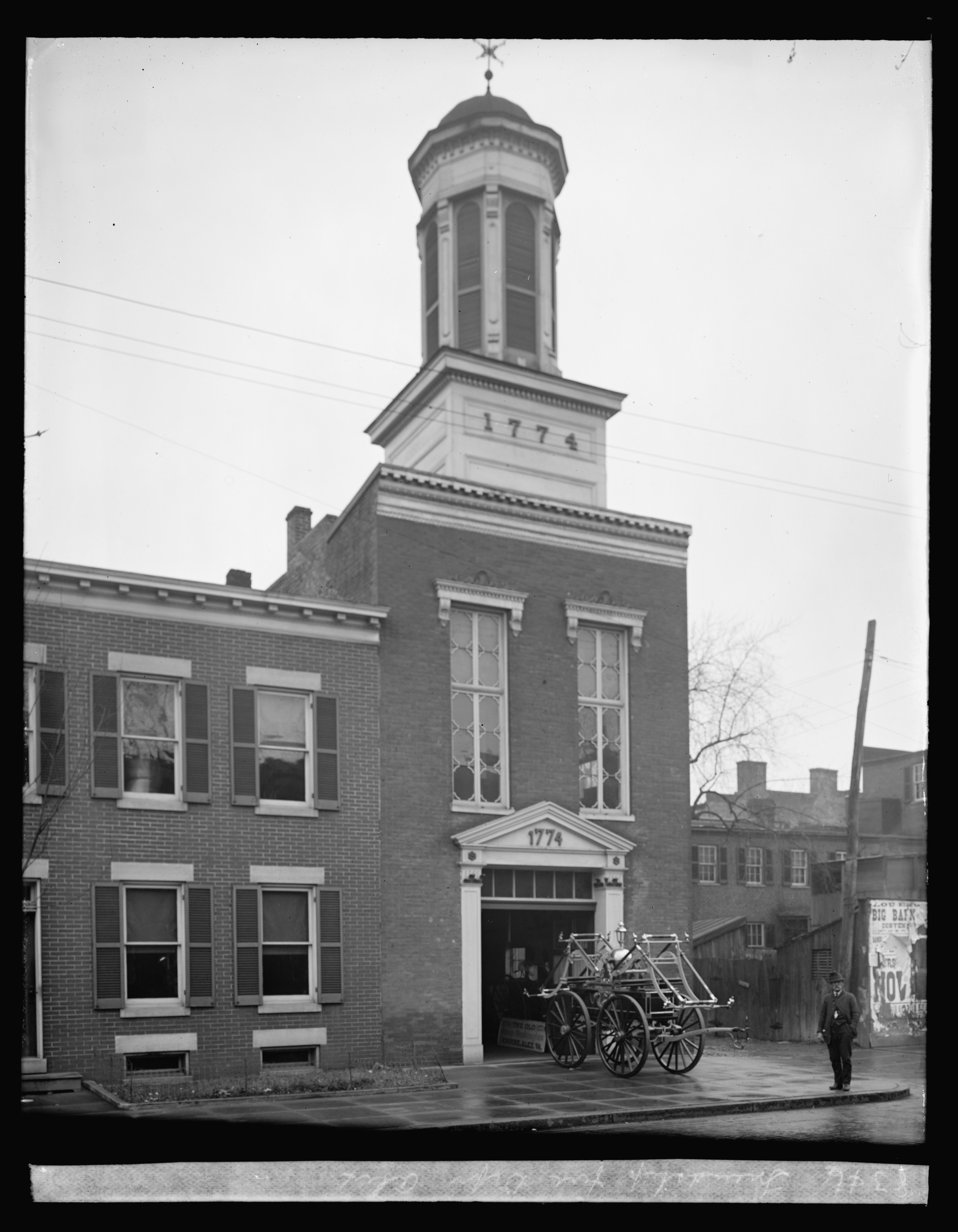
Friendship Fire House in the 1910s

The first fire company in Alexandria was the Friendship Fire Company, founded in 1774. George Washington is reported to have been a part of it, but no records remain to prove that, however he did purchase a fire engine for the company in 1775.

The first paid firefighters were hired in 1855 and the Alexandria Fire Department was established in 1866. Before that the City of Alexandria was served by multiple volunteer departments. By the end of the Civil War, many of the volunteer companies were under staffed so, in 1866, the City Council passed an act to combine the remaining fire companies into the Alexandria Fire Department.

In 1977, the department announced they were no longer hiring firefighters who smoked and anyone hired "signed a contract that included a provision against smoking", as part of a larger push for stricter health requirements. Alexandria was among the first departments in the country to have similar requirements.

Volunteer firefighters, as opposed to volunteers who work in stations and other roles, effectively ended in 1981 when the City passed new regulations requiring all firefighters to meet the stricter standards applied to career firefighters. Former volunteers continued to protest that decision through the mid-1980s, often invoking George Washington's name who they regard as taking part in the first volunteer fire company in Alexandria.

Along with other departments, units from AFD responded to the September 11 attacks at The Pentagon and the Congressional baseball shooting in 2017, which took place in the Del Ray neighborhood of Alexandria.

In early 2021, Alexandria became the first locality in Virginia to authorize public unions to collectively bargain, after Virginia allowed localities to do so for the first time on May 1, 2021, after the Supreme Court of Virginia banned the practice in 1977. The union representing Alexandria firefighters, IAFF Local 2141, became the first that voted to collectively bargain.

== Operations ==
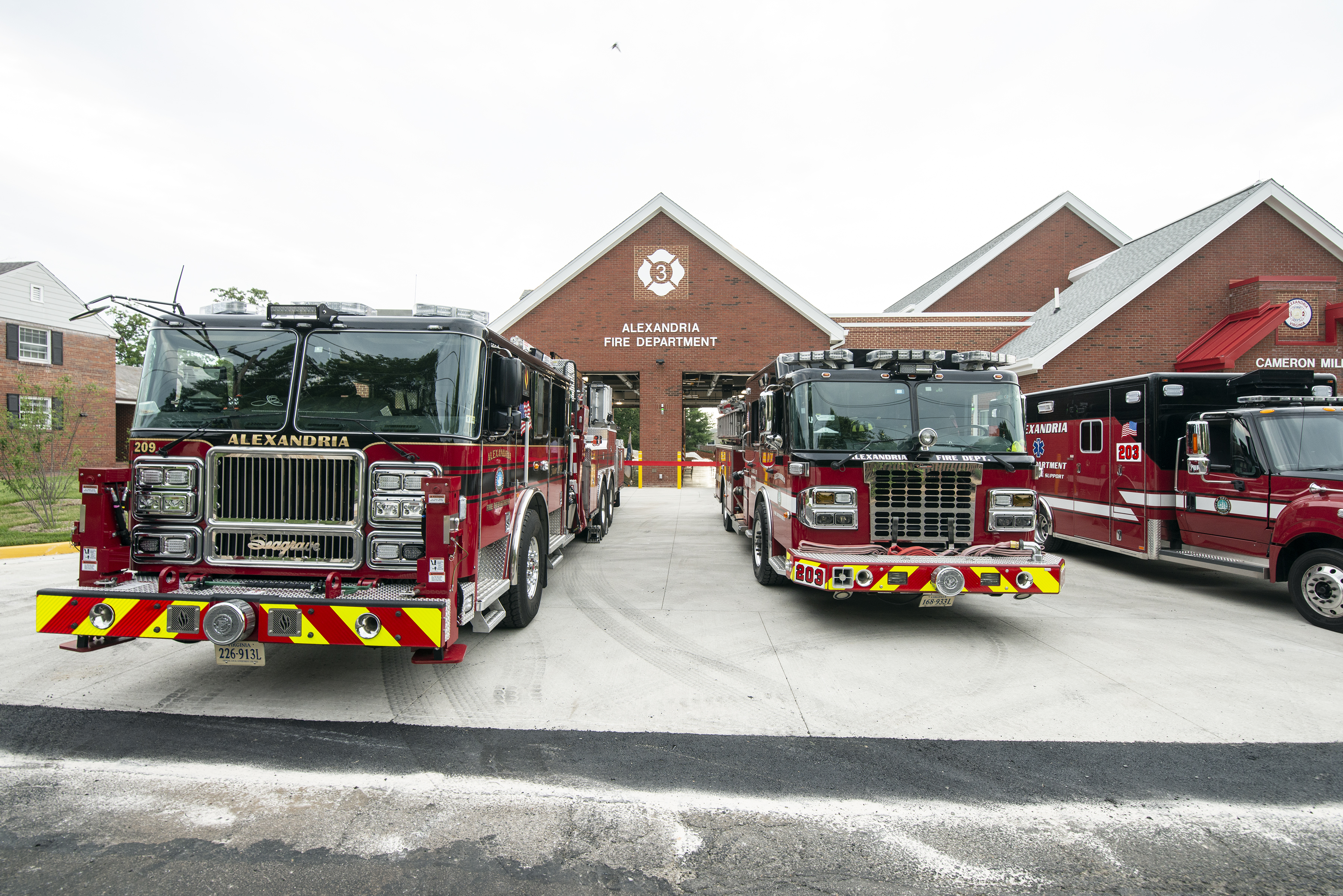
Fire Station 203 Ribbon Cutting in 2021

=== Marine Operations ===
The Marine Operations Division was started in 1997 and works in marine firefighting, open water rescue, and swiftwater rescue. The division has two Zodiac inflatables, towed by an Engine 204 or Support Unit 204 (a Chevy Suburban) with rescue equipment. Additionally the division has a 50-foot (15 m) MetaCraft Firestorm 50 fireboat, the Vigilant, equipped with two 3,400-US-gallon-per-minute (13,000 L/min) pumps attached to four fire monitors.

=== Fire Prevention and Life Safety ===
The Fire Prevention and Life Safety (FPLS) Section is composed of several units – Fire Prevention Inspections, Fire Protection Systems Retesting, Environmental Investigations & Fire Investigations. The Fire Prevention and Life Safety Section is responsible for enforcement of the Virginia Statewide Fire Prevention Code, applicable sections of the Virginia Construction Code and related sections of the Code of the City of Alexandria.

== Stations and apparatus ==
On June 12, 2021, the City of Alexandria Fire Department implemented an organizational restructure. It included Specialty Team relocations, Apparatus Relocations, and upgrading Suppression Units to Advanced Life Support (ALS) units. Four of the Engine Companies and One Truck Company are ALS units. There are two Battalion Management Teams. There is one Fire Battalion Management Team and one EMS Battalion Management Team. There will also be the addition of Emergency Medical Services (EMS) lieutenants and other quality improvements.

ALS Suppression Units will be minimally staffed with one ALS provider on several suppression units. Upgrading these units to ALS units improves coverage in Old Town and Landmark areas, higher medical call volume.

A new station is planned as part of the Landmark Mall redevelopment.

Fire Station Number	Neighborhood	Engine Company	Special Service Company	Medic and Ambulance Units	Fire or EMS Officer Units	Support Units
201	Old Town	Engine 201				UTV 201
202	Del Ray				Safety 201	UTV 202
203	Beverly Hills	Engine 203	Truck 203	Medic 203		
204	Powhatan Park	Engine 204		Ambulance 204	Battalion 201 EMS 201	Fire Boat 201
205	Rosemont	Engine 205	Truck 205	Medic 205		
206	Seminary Valley	Engine 206		Medic 206	Battalion 202 CA 201	
207	Cameron Valley	Engine 207		Ambulance 207		
208	West End	Engine 208	Truck 208	Medic 208		
209	Potomac Yards	Engine 209	Rescue 209	Medic 209		Technical Rescue 209 Water Rescue 209
210	Eisenhower Valley	Engine 210		Ambulance 210		Hazmat 210 Foam 210 Special Hazards 210 Support 210
