= List of killings by law enforcement officers in the United States, October 2013 =

This is a list of people reported killed by non-military law enforcement officers in the United States in October 2013, whether in the line of duty or not, and regardless of reason or method. The listing documents the occurrence of a death, making no implications regarding wrongdoing or justification on the part of the person killed or officer involved. Killings are arranged by date of the incident that caused death. Different death dates, if known, are noted in the description. The table below lists 107 people.

== October 2013 ==
Date	Name (Age) of Deceased	Race	State (City)	Description
2013-10-31	Eric C. Auxier (28)	White	Missouri (Gower)	
2013-10-31	Name Withheld (26)	Unknown race	New York (Bronx)	
2013-10-31	Arthur Page	Unknown race	North Carolina (Beaufort)	
2013-10-31	Howell, John Wayne (57)	Black	Georgia (Taylor County)	About 5 p.m. on October 31, three deputies responded to a 911 call from residents on Old Wire Road who said a man, later identified as John Wayne Howell, was acting "erratically" and was threatening people with a machete. When deputies arrived, they tried to get Howell to drop the machete and a fight ensued while trying to get him under control. Howell advanced on one deputy, who tripped while trying to back away. When the officer went down, Howell raised the machete and swung, but missed. Then the other two deputies both fatally shot Howell.
2013-10-30	Shane Whitworth (30)	Unknown race	Virginia (Virginia Beach)	
2013-10-30	James Bryant (28)	Black	Virginia (Fort Belvoir)	
2013-10-30	Alfred Ferrell III (28)	Black	Indiana (Indianapolis)	
2013-10-30	John Curtis "JC" Garreaux (24)	Native American	South Dakota (Fort Thompson)	
2013-10-30	Dionne L. Jordan (30)	Black	Pennsylvania (Erie)	
2013-10-29	Cortdalro Damarcel Brown (25)	Black	Texas (Houston)	
2013-10-29	Michael A. Sica (57)	White	New York (Syracuse)	
2013-10-29	Dominique Jean (51)	Black	Florida (Miami)	
2013-10-29	Quentin Eric Hicks (49)	Black	California (Inglewood)	
2013-10-28	Wilmon L. Hutto Jr. (71)	White	South Carolina (Lexington)	
2013-10-28	Pryor, George (61)	Black	Georgia (Statesboro)	Police were at Pryor's home dealing with a code enforcement issue. A confrontation ensued and Pryor was killed.
2013-10-28	Peterson, Clinton (27)	White	Texas (Duncanville)	Officers approached Peterson during a disturbance call. He led them on a foot chase before being shot and killed.
2013-10-27	Reyna, Amy (35)	White	New Mexico, (Lea County)	Police were attempting to arrest Reyna for warrants related to probation violations. She led police on a 20-mile chase with speeds up to 100mph, crossing into New Mexico. Tires blown out, she drove into a farm field and came to a stop but she did not get out. An officer shot first into her engine and then directly at her, claiming he thought she was reaching for something. She died on scene. She was unarmed but an autopsy found methamphetamines in her system.
2013-10-27	Cosby, Jarmel (28)	Black	Florida (Jacksonville)	Police were searching for a suspect who had just robbed a convenience store. Cosby matched the description of the robber and was ordered to surrender after being confronted by task force officers. Cosby attempted to flee police but was unable to go over a fence. Police then shot Cosby after he reached for a gun that he had dropped while trying to jump over the fence.
2013-10-27	Murphy, Jake (26)	White	Tennessee (Drummonds)	Police were at a home searching for a man wanted on probation violation. The man's son, Jake, suddenly came towards police and stated he had a weapon. Officers attempted to use a taser to subdue Murphy but he continued approaching them. Officers then shot and killed Murphy.
2013-10-27	Arturo Jorge Guzman (51)	Hispanic	Florida (Hialeah)	
2013-10-27	William Alfred Harvey III (57)	Black	California (Bellflower)	
2013-10-27	Marie Leanne Edith Hartman (26)	White	Maryland (Baltimore)	
2013-10-27	Andrew Scott Hoffman (27)	White	Maryland (Baltimore)	
2013-10-26	Robertson, Jonathan (32)	Unknown	Virginia (Pearisburg)	Police were searching for two men who had committed a robbery the previous day. Robertson began shooting at officers after he was pulled over. An accomplice ran from the scene and was later arrested. Robertson fled in his vehicle and continued firing his weapon until police were able to overcome him.
2013-10-26	Collins, Josh (29)	White	Arizona (Yuma)	A police chief was investigating a 'shots fired' call with a resident at an apartment complex when Collins confronted them. Collins then proceeded to attack both of them. He repeatedly stabbed the police chief before being shot and killed.
2013-10-26	Roland, Ronald (18)	Black	North Carolina (Wilmington)	Three men forced a Pizza Hut employee who was outside back inside at gunpoint and robbed those inside the restaurant. Police arrived on scene, and the three suspects ignored the commands of the police and engaged into a shootout. Two of the robbers were killed, and a third was wounded. No officers were injured.
2013-10-26	Robinson, Tevin (20)	Black	North Carolina (Wilmington)	Three men forced a Pizza Hut employee who was outside back inside at gunpoint and robbed those inside the restaurant. Police arrived on scene, and the three suspects ignored the commands of the police and engaged into a shootout. Two of the robbers were killed, and a third was wounded. No officers were injured.
2013-10-26	Dimetri Polen (24)	Black	Florida (West Palm Beach)	
2013-10-26	Christopher Chase (35)	White	New Mexico (Albuquerque)	
2013-10-26	Richard Rodriguez (32)	Hispanic	California (Banning)	
2013-10-26	David DiRoma (69)	White	Florida (Clearwater)	
2013-10-25	Julie Ann Caudill (43)	White	Ohio (Dublin)	
2013-10-25	Parlette, Robert, Jr. (73)	White	Florida (Islamorada)	Parlette was shot and killed by police after he fired his gun at deputies.
2013-10-25	Torres-Elizondo, Victor (30)	Hispanic	Oregon (Hillsboro)	A man fired at least one gunshot at an officer at close range during a traffic stop. Two officers responded by fatally shooting the man.
2013-10-25	Munoz, Sergio (39)	Hispanic	California (Ridgecrest)	Munoz, suspected of murdering a woman and wounding a man in Ridgecrest, was shot and killed by seven police officers during a car chase in the Mojave Desert. He fired on vehicles and held hostages in his car. The hostages were flown to a hospital in critical condition after being shot by Munoz.
2013-10-25	Damon Cortez Hall (34)	Black	Missouri (St. Louis)	After reports of a man wielding a heavy duty semi-automatic pistol were made, police arrived on the scene. The man was killed during a shootout with police officers.
2013-10-24	Vincent L. Young (68)	White	Florida (St. Petersburg)	A man walked into an emergency room of A Bay Pines VA Medical Center and reportedly waved a knife around, which prompted Veterans Affairs police officers to shoot him.
2013-10-24	Henning, Steven (32)	White	California (Weed)	Police were called after an act of arson was committed by a man in front of a bus station. When police made contact with the suspect, Steven Henning, he refused to extinguish the fire acted aggressively and violently resisted arrest. Henning attempted to steal the officers' police car, and was subdued by pepper spray. Afterward, he violently resisted arrest again, grabbed an officer's Taser, and then fled on foot. The Weed Police, Siskiyou Sheriff's office and California Highway Patrol searched for Henning and found him near a freeway overpass. After an attempt to subdue him with a law enforcement canine unit, Henning continued to violently resist arrest and attempted to injure the canine. The officer and deputy discharged their firearms and Henning was killed.
2013-10-24	Styles, Angelique (60)	Black	Illinois (Chicago)	A woman was shot to death in a home she shared with her brother after refusing to drop a knife while in front of officers.
2013-10-24	Swiney, Matthew Deshune (22)	Black	Texas(Houston)	Swiney was fatally shot by police after holding a large knife dragging his mother down the hallway. His mother was treated at a hospital for stab wounds.
2013-10-24	Tray, Michael (27)	White	Minnesota (Minnetonka)	Tray was shot by police after allegedly pointing a revolver at them in a garage of an apartment complex.
2013-10-24	Michael Clifford Garmon (47)	White	Georgia (Atlanta)	
2013-10-24	Rogelio Cisneros-Chavez (22)	Hispanic	New Mexico (Espanola)	
2013-10-23	John Robert Dellafiora (46)	Unknown race	Nevada (Winnemucca)	
2013-10-23	Lofaro, Matthew (28)	White	Connecticut (Milford)	Lofaro was shot and killed by a state trooper after refusing to drop his weapon while committing an armed robbery at a convenience store.
2013-10-22	Lopez, Andy (13)	Hispanic	California (Santa Rosa)	Deputies were responding to a report of a suspicious person when they spotted Lopez, a 13-year-old eighth-grader, carrying what they believed to be an assault rifle while walking through a vacant lot. After Lopez did not obey orders to drop the gun, deputy Erick Gelhaus fired eight rounds at him from 20 to 30 feet away. Lopez, who was actually carrying an airsoft replica of an AK-47 which fired plastic pellets, was struck seven times and died at the scene. In July 2014, Sonoma County District Attorney Jill Ravitch decided not to file criminal charges against Gelhaus, claiming that the deputy fired at Lopez in self-defense and believed that the airsoft replica was a real firearm.
2013-10-22	James "J.D" David Duttman (57)	White	Florida (North Port)	
2013-10-22	Terrance Harris (40)	Black	Illinois (Chicago)	
2013-10-22	Salonga, Ryan (25)	Hispanic	California (San Bruno)	Police shot and killed a stolen car suspect.
2013-10-21	Lopez, Timothy (47)	Hispanic	California (Union City)	Police shot and killed a man wielding a pipe.
2013-10-21	Tracy Clyde (42)	Black	Georgia (Leesburg)	A Leesburg Police Officer fatally shot a man who was wanted for breaking into a house and attacking its owner.
2013-10-21	David Long (42)	Black	Mississippi (Coffeeville)	A police officer accompanied a domestic violence victim to the home she shared with the alleged abuser to remove her belongings and was shot at by this subject. He was wounded but returned fire and killed the assailant.
2013-10-21	Eric John Breum (55)	White	Washington (Index)	
2013-10-21	Christoval Quintana (30)	Hispanic	New Mexico (Roswell)	
2013-10-20	Mariano Joseph Mauro (53)	White	California (Portola)	
2013-10-20	Burlakoff, Ian	White	Florida (Boca Raton)	Police shot and killed Burlakoff after failing to comply with officers' orders and tried to reach for a handgun. Witnesses said that Burlakoff shot and killed a woman, who was related to him. Her body was found in an empty lot.
2013-10-19	Walker, Taemarr (24)	Black	Ohio (Warren)	Police shot and killed Walker after he pointed a handgun at an officer.
2013-10-19	Ernesto Gutierrez Cortez (38)	Hispanic	California (Otay Mesa)	
2013-10-18	Eddie Hollins (33)	Black	South Carolina (Columbia)	
2013-10-18	Felix Valdez (44)	Hispanic	Illinois (Chicago)	
2013-10-18	James Allen (25)	White	California (Visalia)	
2013-10-17	Jose Zamora-Guerrero (36)	Hispanic	Indiana (Indianapolis)	
2013-10-17	Kerr, Jason (31)	White	Florida (St. Petersburg)	Police shot and killed a 31-year-old man.
2013-10-17	Shawn Dewayne Dean (40)	Black	Maryland (Baltimore)	
2013-10-16	Kevin Robert Welsh (35)	White	Kansas (Eureka)	
2013-10-16	Adrian Suarez (22)	Hispanic	Washington (Wishram)	
2013-10-15	John Shepherd (58)	White	Louisiana (Shreveport)	
2013-10-15	Aaron Dumas (32)	Black	Tennessee (Memphis)	
2013-10-15	Cameron Massey (26)	Black	Alabama (Eufaula)	
2013-10-14	Earl Glenn Morrow (83)	White	Alabama (Ozark)	
2013-10-14	Shannon R. Spencer (39)	White	Ohio (Huber Heights)	
2013-10-14	Jacob Westberg (22)	White	South Dakota (Sioux Falls)	
2013-10-14	Andrew William Aldrich (24)	White	South Carolina (Anderson)	
2013-10-14	McNair, Shaqur (16)	Black	North Carolina (Fayetteville)	Around 6:00PM Officer Christopher Hunt responded to a domestic disturbance call and entered the neighborhood in his squad car alone. Upon arriving, Officer Hunt made the arrest of a man named in the dispute, when the suspect's mother, 39-year-old Alfricka Bennett, attacked the officer. Officer Hunt then tried to arrest Bennett, but then her 16-year-old son and several others confronted the officer. Her son, Shaqur McNair, was seen rushing toward the officer reaching for a gun, when the officer fired 4 shots and killed McNair. A stolen gun was recovered from the scene and Officer Hunt was cleared of any wrongdoing.
2013-10-13	Monica Ritchey (45)	White	Nevada (Sparks)	
2013-10-13	Jonathan Kane Garay (26)	Hispanic	Pennsylvania (Hazleton)	
2013-10-13	Brandon Devone Smith (30)	Black	North Carolina (Wilmington)	
2013-10-13	William Taylor (32)	Black	Ohio (Lorain)	
2013-10-13	Benjamin Henry Burba (59)	White	Kentucky (Hodgenville)	
2013-10-11	Sheldon C. Norman (21)	White	Florida (Lakeland)	
2013-10-11	Darryl Lee Drayton (51)	Black	South Carolina (James Island)	
2013-10-11	Kenneth Ray Clark (47)	White	Tennessee (Bristol)	
2013-10-11	Raymond Johnson (41)	White	California (Moreno Valley)	
2013-10-11	Shawn Keith Nims (40)	White	Missouri (Cedar Hill)	
2013-10-09	Max Cocheta Martin (43)	White	North Carolina (Leicester)	
2013-10-09	Piccard, Thomas (55)	White	West Virginia (Wheeling)	Piccard was shot and killed by a Wheeling police officer and a US court security officer. He had allegedly fired over 20 rounds into the federal courthouse building with an assault rifle. Piccard had retired from the Wheeling Police Department in 2000 after more than 20 years as an officer.
2013-10-09	Christopher Ouellette (28)	White	Maine (Old Town)	
2013-10-08	Robertson, Jack (43)	Black	Georgia (Waycross)	Robertson was shot by police after he allegedly lunged at them with meat fork and knife.
2013-10-08	Marcus Young (28)	Unknown race	Washington, DC	
2013-10-08	Winford Raynard Watkins (44)	White	Texas (Weatherford)	
2013-10-06	Darrell Atkinson (49)	Black	California (Los Angeles)	
2013-10-06	Bruce Douglas Graham (53)	White	California (Castaic)	
2013-10-05	Jared Harris (25)	Black	Missouri (St. Louis)	
2013-10-05	Jeffery A. Sutherland (24)	White	Washington (Wenatchee)	
2013-10-05	Steven Motley (33)	White	California (Redding)	
2013-10-05	Chris Sample (39)	White	Arkansas (Lake Hamilton)	
2013-10-05	Sherman T. Threets (28)	Black	Illinois (Posen)	
2013-10-04	Reginald Williams Jr. (29)	Black	Ohio (Cleveland)	
2013-10-04	Jack Lamar Roberson (43)	Black	Georgia (Waycross)	
2013-10-04	John Bartholomew (21)	White	Wisconsin (Sparta)	
2013-10-03	Timmy Dewayne Myrick (37)	White	Arkansas (Paragould)	
2013-10-03	Carey, Miriam (34)	Black	Washington, D.C.	Miriam Carey, a dental hygienist from Stamford, Connecticut, attempted to drive through a White House security checkpoint in her black Infiniti G37 coupe, struck a U.S. Secret Service officer, and was chased by the Secret Service to the United States Capitol where she was fatally shot by law enforcement officers. See Shooting of Miriam Carey.
2013-10-03	Dawud Alexander (24)	Black	New Jersey (Irvington)	
2013-10-02	Elijah Glay (39)	Black	Maryland (Calverton)	
2013-10-01	Maria Rita Zarate (31)	Hispanic	California (Bakersfield)	
2013-10-01	Wendy Lawrence (45)	White	New Hampshire (Manchester)	
2013-10-01	Joel Ledezma Ramos (35)	Hispanic	Texas (Freeport)	

== See also ==
- Death in custody § United States
- Henry A. Wallace Police Crime Public Database
- List of cases of police brutality
- List of countries with annual rates and counts for killings by law enforcement officers
- List of law enforcement officers killed in the line of duty in the United States
- List of law enforcement officers convicted for an on-duty killing in the United States
- List of shootings by US immigration agents
- List of police reforms related to the George Floyd protests
- List of unarmed African Americans killed by law enforcement officers in the United States
- Lists of killings by law enforcement officers
- Police brutality in the United States
- Police misconduct § United States
- Police riot § United States
- Police use of deadly force in the United States
