= United States Capitol Police =

Police agency protecting the U.S. Congress

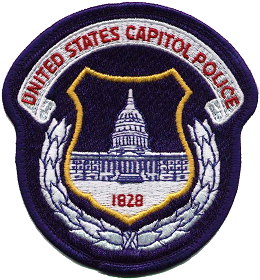
- Patch of the United States Capitol Police

- Emblem of the United States Capitol Police

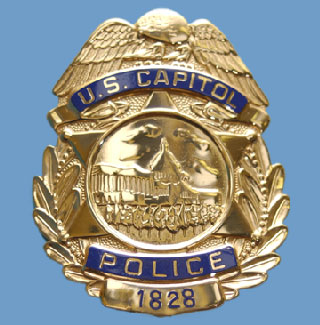
- Badge of the United States Capitol Police

- Flag of the United States Capitol Police
- Common name: U.S. Capitol Police
- Abbreviation: USCP
- Motto: "A Tradition of Service and Protection"

Agency overview
- Formed: May 2, 1828; 198 years ago
- Employees: 2,249
- Annual budget: $708 million (FY2023)

Jurisdictional structure
- Federal agency (Operations jurisdiction): United States
- Operations jurisdiction: United States
- Legal jurisdiction: 1. Any area of the United States when pursuant to their special duties. 2. Congressional buildings, parks, and thoroughfares. Members of Congress, Officers of Congress, and their families throughout the United States, its territories and possessions.
- Governing body: Capitol Police Board
- Constituting instrument: United States Code, Title 2, Chapter 29
- General nature: Federal law enforcement; Civilian police

Operational structure
- Headquarters: 119 D Street, NE; Washington, D.C., U.S. 20510
- Police Officer / Special Agent (for specialized members)s: 1,879
- Civilians: 300
- Agency executive: Michael G. Sullivan, Chief of Police
- Units: 10: Sworn Specialties: Dignitary Protection; Threat Assessment; Intelligence Investigations; Criminal Investigations; Hazardous Devices (Bomb Squad); Containment and Emergency Response Team; Patrol & K-9; Civilian Specialties: Hazardous Materials Response Team; Intelligence Analysis; Emergency Management

Facilities
- Cars: 201

Website
- www.uscp.gov

The United States Capitol Police (USCP) is a federal law enforcement agency in the United States with nationwide jurisdiction charged with protecting the United States Congress in the District of Columbia and throughout the United States and its territories. It answers to the Capitol Police Board and is the only law enforcement agency under the legislative branch of the federal government of the United States.

The United States Capitol Police has the primary responsibility for protecting life and property, preventing, detecting, and investigating criminal acts, and enforcing traffic regulations throughout a complex of congressional buildings, parks, and thoroughfares. The Capitol Police has primary jurisdiction within buildings and grounds of the United States Capitol Complex. It also has concurrent jurisdiction with other law enforcement agencies, including the United States Park Police and the Metropolitan Police Department of the District of Columbia, in an area of approximately 200 blocks around the complex. Officers also have jurisdiction throughout the District of Columbia to take enforcement action when they observe or are made aware of crimes of violence while on official duties.

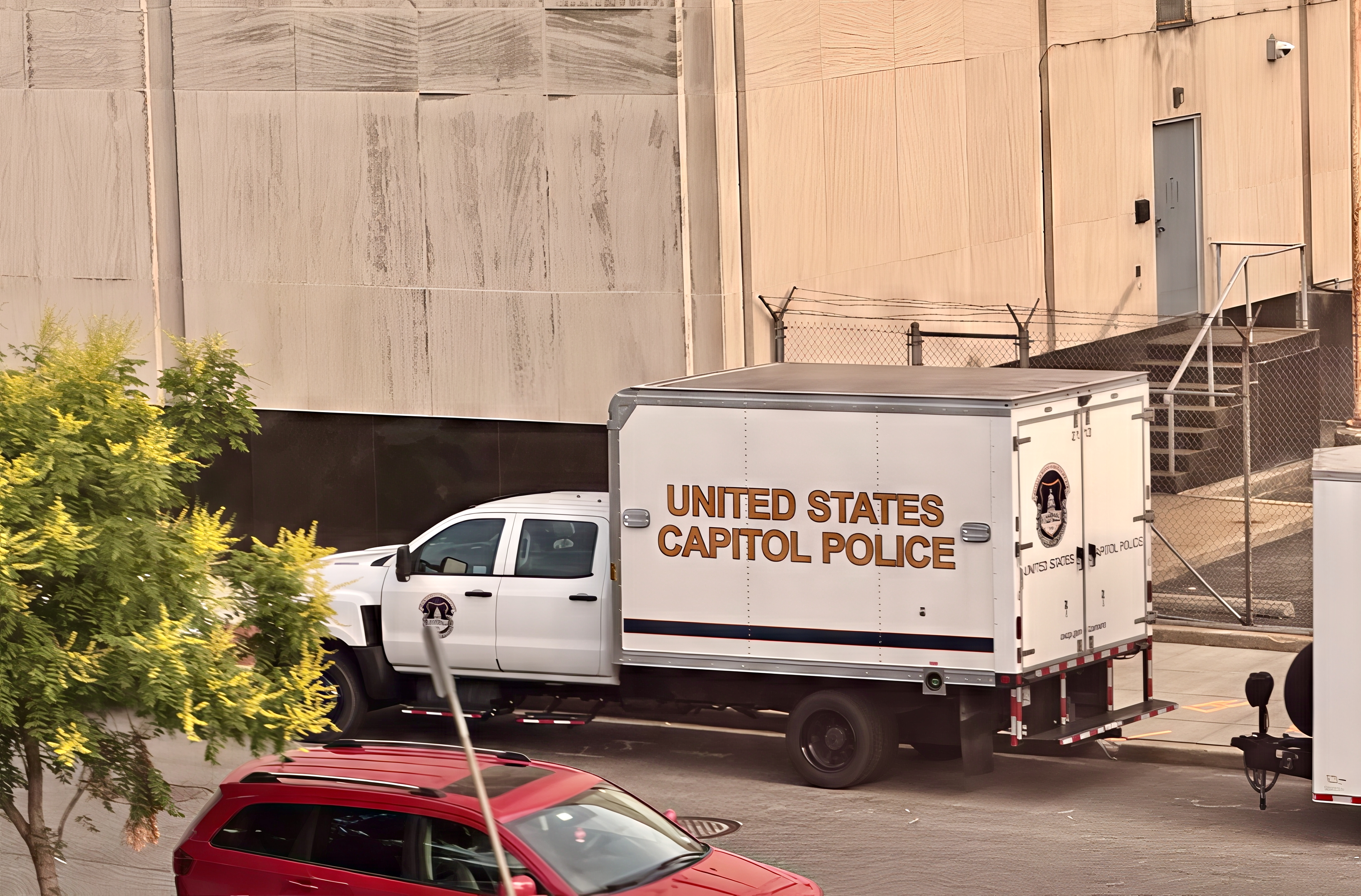
USCP truck parked on E St. SW in Washington, D.C.

Additionally, they are charged with the protection of members of Congress, officers of Congress, and their families throughout the entire United States, its territories and possessions, and the District of Columbia. While performing protective functions, the Capitol Police have jurisdiction throughout the entire United States. It is informally considered as the sister agency of the United States Secret Service, which itself is responsible for the protection of the United States president and their Cabinet.

== Jurisdiction and budget ==
Each year, the USCP investigates thousands of "concerning statements" and direct threats against Members of Congress, their families, and staff. The number of such cases has grown in recent years, and tends to increase in election years.

In the early 1980s, the protective mandates and jurisdictions of the U.S. Capitol Police were substantially expanded to allow them to protect legislators away from their normal jurisdictions in response to the growing risk and threats faced by legislators and the growing institutionalization of Congress.

U.S. Code, Title 2, Chapter 29 defines the powers and duties of the U.S. Capitol Police. The U.S. Capitol Police has the authority to enforce the laws of the United States in any area of the United States and has the power to effect warrantless arrests for any offense against the United States committed in their presence, or for any felony cognizable under the laws of the United States upon probable cause, in the performance of their protective duties. Qualified members of the U.S. Capitol Police may also travel outside of the United States when performing security advisory and liaison functions for congressional travel.

The primary jurisdiction of the United States Capitol Police centers on the United States Capitol building in Washington, D.C., the adjacent congressional (House and Senate) offices, and the Library of Congress buildings. This primary jurisdiction is about 270 acres (0.42 mi^{2}; 1.1 km^{2}), with about 58 acres (0.091 mi^{2}; 0.23 km^{2}) being the Capitol grounds themselves.

The U.S. Capitol Police has also concurrent jurisdiction with the District of Columbia's Metropolitan Police Department (MPD), the U.S. Park Police, the U.S. Secret Service Uniformed Division, and others federal agencies to enforce District of Columbia laws, based upon cooperative agreements with MPD and the Police Coordination Act covering local cooperation with 32 federal law enforcement agencies.

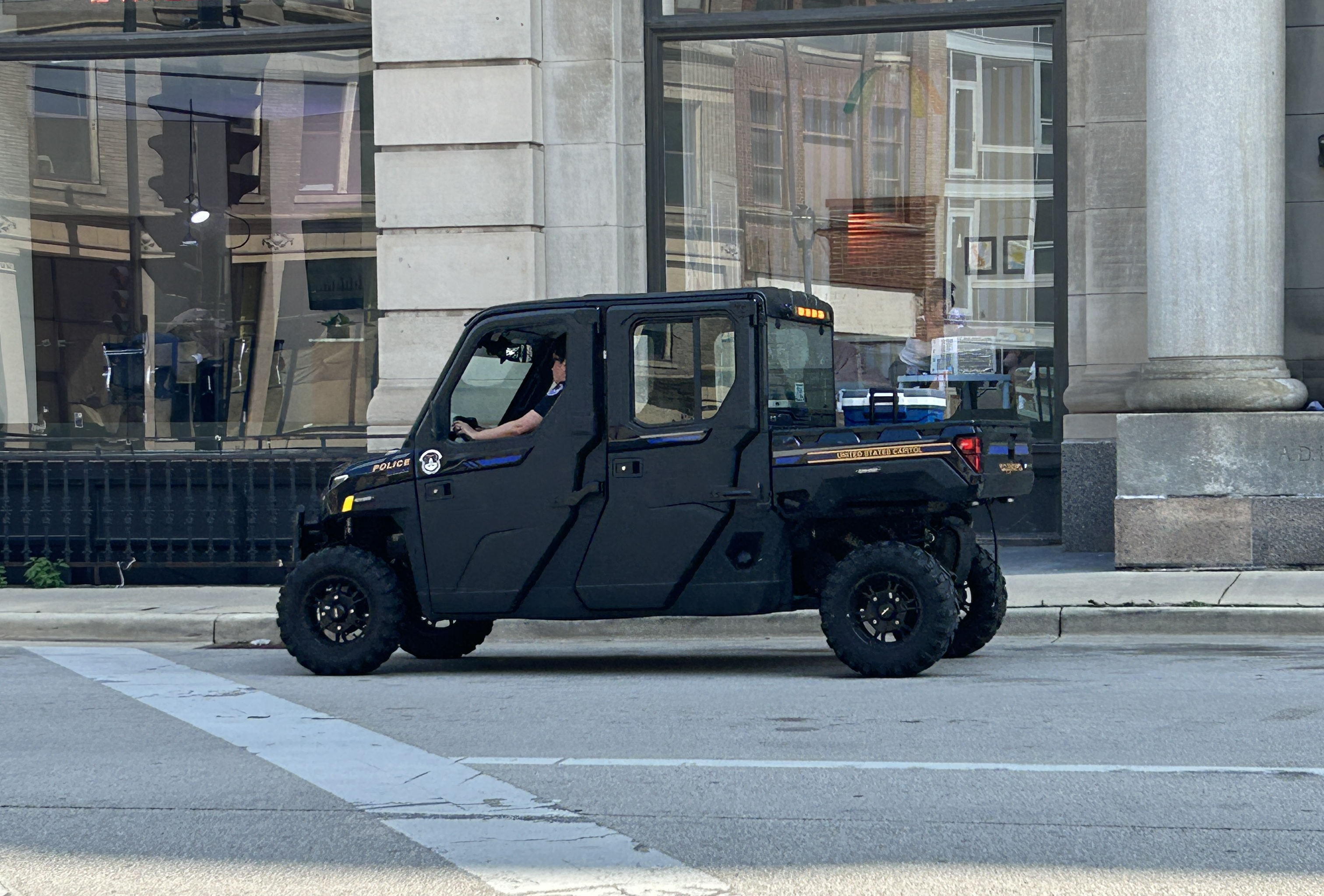
USCP vehicle in Milwaukee during the 2024 Republican National Convention. Capitol police are involved in security during presidential nominating conventions.

The U.S. Capitol Police also have extended jurisdiction over parts of Northeast, Northwest, and Southwest Washington D.C. The USCP provides protection detail to House and Senate leaders, other Members of Congress depending on individual risk analysis, Members' state and district offices (with the help of local police), and "off-campus" events such as presidential nominating conventions.

Four congressional committees have statutory oversight. The authority of the police chief is, in many ways, restrained. The Capitol Police chief reports to the Capitol Police Board, a three-person group composed of the Senate and House sergeants at arms and the architect of the Capitol. The chief is "whipsawed between partisan politicians and career professionals like the two Sergeants at Arms and congressional staff...here they literally have hundreds of people who think they're their bosses." The pay for the USCP Chief is far less than many police chiefs in the US.

In FY 2021, the USCP had an annual budget of more than $515 million; it employs more than 2,000 sworn and civilian personnel, making it one of the most well-funded and well-staffed police departments relative to the two square miles it guards. USCP's budget is divided into a salaries account, used for overtime and benefits, and a general expenses account, used for equipment, vehicles, communications, training, medical services, forensic services, etc. USCP cannot transfer money between the accounts without the approval the House and Senate Appropriations Committees.

In FY 2022, USCP's annual budget was $602 million.

In FY 2023, USCP's annual budget increased to $708 million to provide resources to fulfill security recommendations as suggested by the Government Accountability Office and the Office of Inspector General after the January 6th attacks on the Capitol.

== Training ==
U.S. Capitol Police officers attend training at the Capitol Police Training Academy in Cheltenham, Maryland and is one of many agencies that sends its recruits to the Federal Law Enforcement Training Center (FLETC), located in Glynco, Georgia, for initial training. Rarely, recruits are sent to the FLETC location in Artesia, New Mexico.

Following 12 weeks at FLETC, recruits return to FLETC's location in Cheltenham, for an additional 13 weeks of training. After the recruits' academy training, graduates are sworn in as law enforcement officers and assigned to one of four divisions to begin their careers. Once assigned, officers are assigned a Field Training Officer (FTO) for a definite period to provide additional on-the-job training. FTOs provide weekly updates on the subjects that have been learned and issue tests to the new officers.

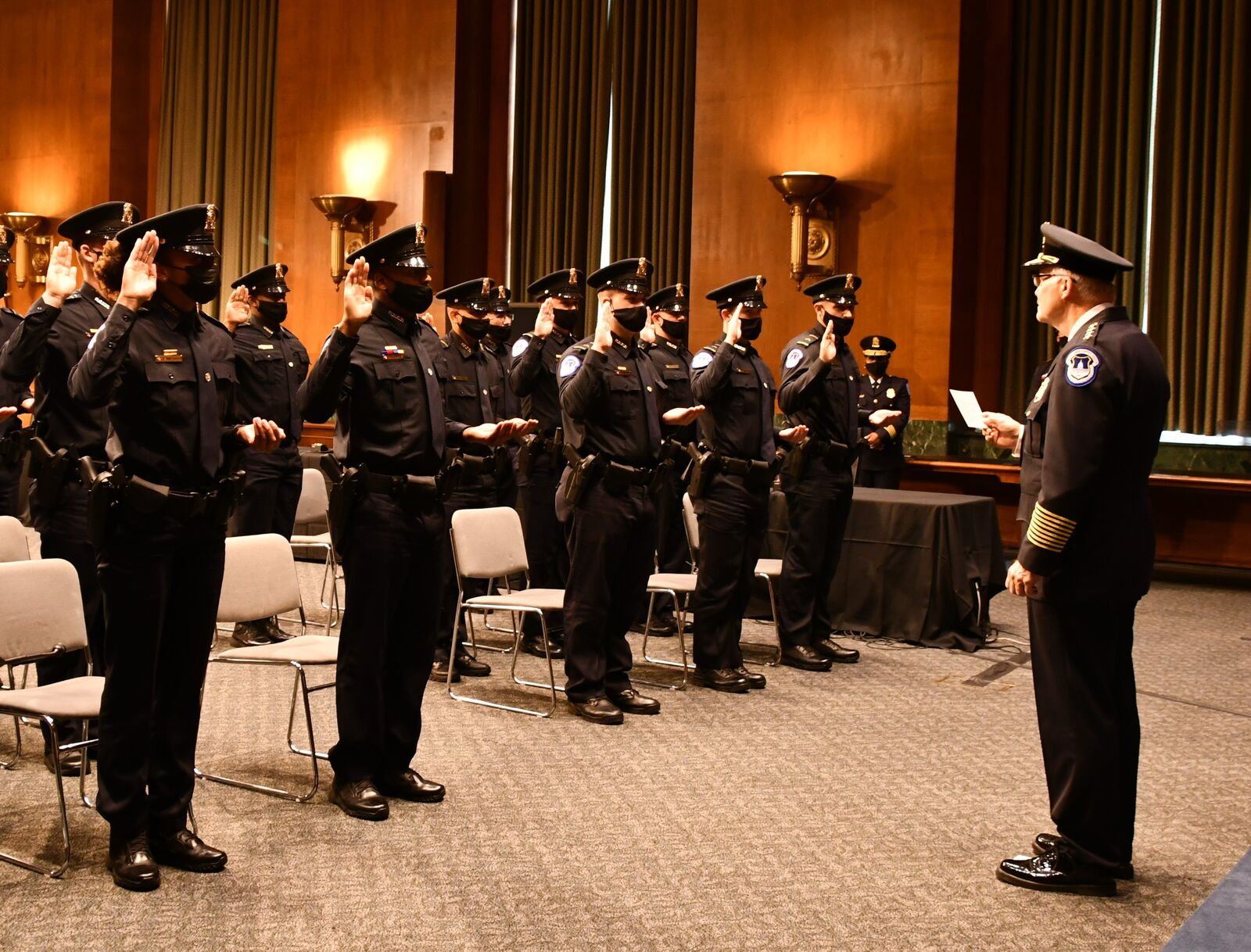
Swear-in graduation ceremony from an Academy class

Officers are also subject to a one-year probationary period. Starting salary is $83,362.00. After 30 months of satisfactory performance, officers are eligible for promotion to private first class (PFC).

USCP officers and special agents are covered under the Federal Law Enforcement Officer (LEO) enhanced retirement provisions under the Civil Service Retirement (CSRS), which covers federal employees hired before 1984, or the Federal Employees' Retirement System (FERS), which covers employees hired in 1984 or later. Similar to other Federal LEOs covered under those enhanced retirement provisions (e.g., DEA, FBI, U.S. Marshals, U.S. Secret Service, ICE, Border Patrol), USCP officers and special agents are subject to mandatory retirement at age 57, or as soon as 20 years of service have been completed after age 57.

== Specialized bureaus and units ==
The U.S. Capitol Police is organized into bureaus and offices that report to each of the executive team members.

USCP contains several specialty units and assignments offering expert training. These specialty units are within the Uniformed Services Bureau, the Protective Services Bureau, the Operational Services Bureau, and the Mission Assurance Bureau:

=== Uniformed Services Bureau (USB) ===
- Long-Gun Certified Officers
- Mountain Bike Unit
- Motorcycle Unit
- Civil Active Disturbance Unit

=== Protective Services Bureau (PSB) ===
- Criminal Investigation
- Intelligence Unit
- Threat Assessment Unit
- Dignitary Protection Unit
- Liaison and Taskforces with Partner Agencies

=== Operational Services Bureau (OSB) ===
- Special Operations Division
- Containment Emergency Response Team (SWAT Team)
- Motorcycle/Motorcade Operations
- K-9 Unit
- Crash Investigation
- Criminal Interdiction
- Drug Recognition Experts
- Hazardous Devices Section
- Hazardous Material Response Team

== Leadership ==
Pursuant to 2 U.S.C. §1901, the U.S. Capitol Police is headed by a chief who is appointed and reports to the Capitol Police Board following a highly selective process.

Michael G. Sullivan was sworn in as the 12th chief of the U.S. Capitol Police on June 30, 2025. Previously, Sean Gallagher served as the acting chief of police and while concurrently as the assistant chief of police for uniformed operations .

Previous chiefs include the following:

- Terrance Gainer, appointed in June 2002
- Phillip D. Morse Sr., appointed on October 30, 2006
- Kim Dine, appointed on December 17, 2012
- Matthew R. Verderosa, appointed on March 20, 2016
- Steven Sund, appointed on June 13, 2019
- J. Thomas Manger, appointed July 22, 2021

=== Capitol Police Board ===
The Capitol Police Board is the body that governs the United States Capitol Police. It was established in 1873, and today consists of three voting members: the sergeant at arms of the United States House of Representatives, the sergeant at arms of the United States Senate, and the architect of the Capitol. Additionally, the chief of the Capitol Police serves ex officio as a non-voting member. The chairmanship of the board alternates annually between the House and Senate sergeants at arms.

The board, like Congress, is not subject to freedom of information laws, and the inspector general of the board does not publish their findings and reports to the board who retains their employment.

Current board

Current board members are listed below by order of tenure.

Name	Role	Member since	Title
William McFarland	Member	January 7, 2023	Sergeant at Arms of the United States House of Representatives
Thomas E. Austin	Member	June 24, 2024	Architect of the Capitol
Jennifer Hemingway	Chair	January 3, 2025	Sergeant at Arms of the United States Senate
Michael G. Sullivan	Ex-Officio Member	June 30, 2025	Chief, United States Capitol Police

== History ==
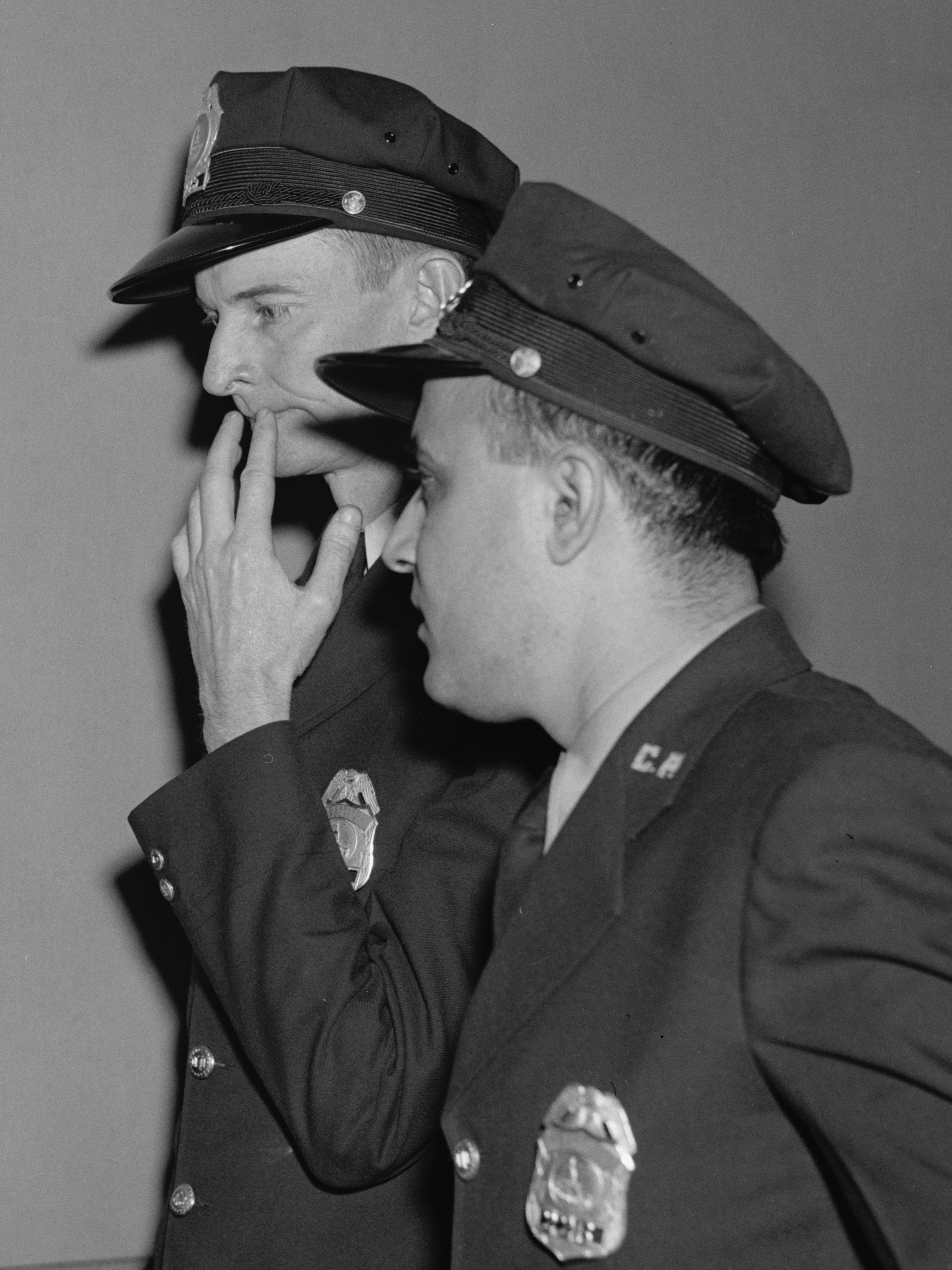
USCP officers in 1940

The history of the United States Capitol Police dates back to 1801 when Congress moved from the city of Philadelphia to the newly constructed Capitol Building in Washington, D.C. At the time, Congress appointed one watchman to protect the building and Congressional property.

The police were formally created by Congress in 1828 following the assault on John Adams II, the son of John Quincy Adams, in the Capitol rotunda. The United States Capitol Police had as its original duty the provision of security for the United States Capitol.

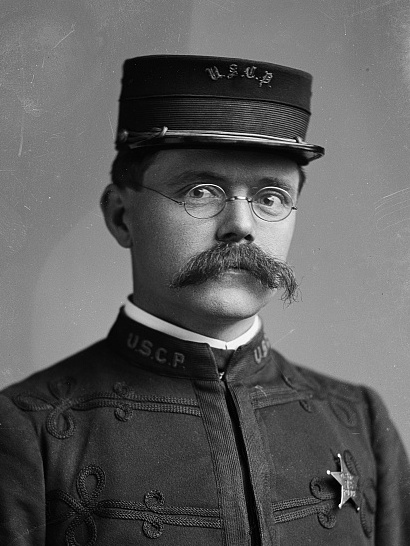
A United States Capitol Police officer with a star badge

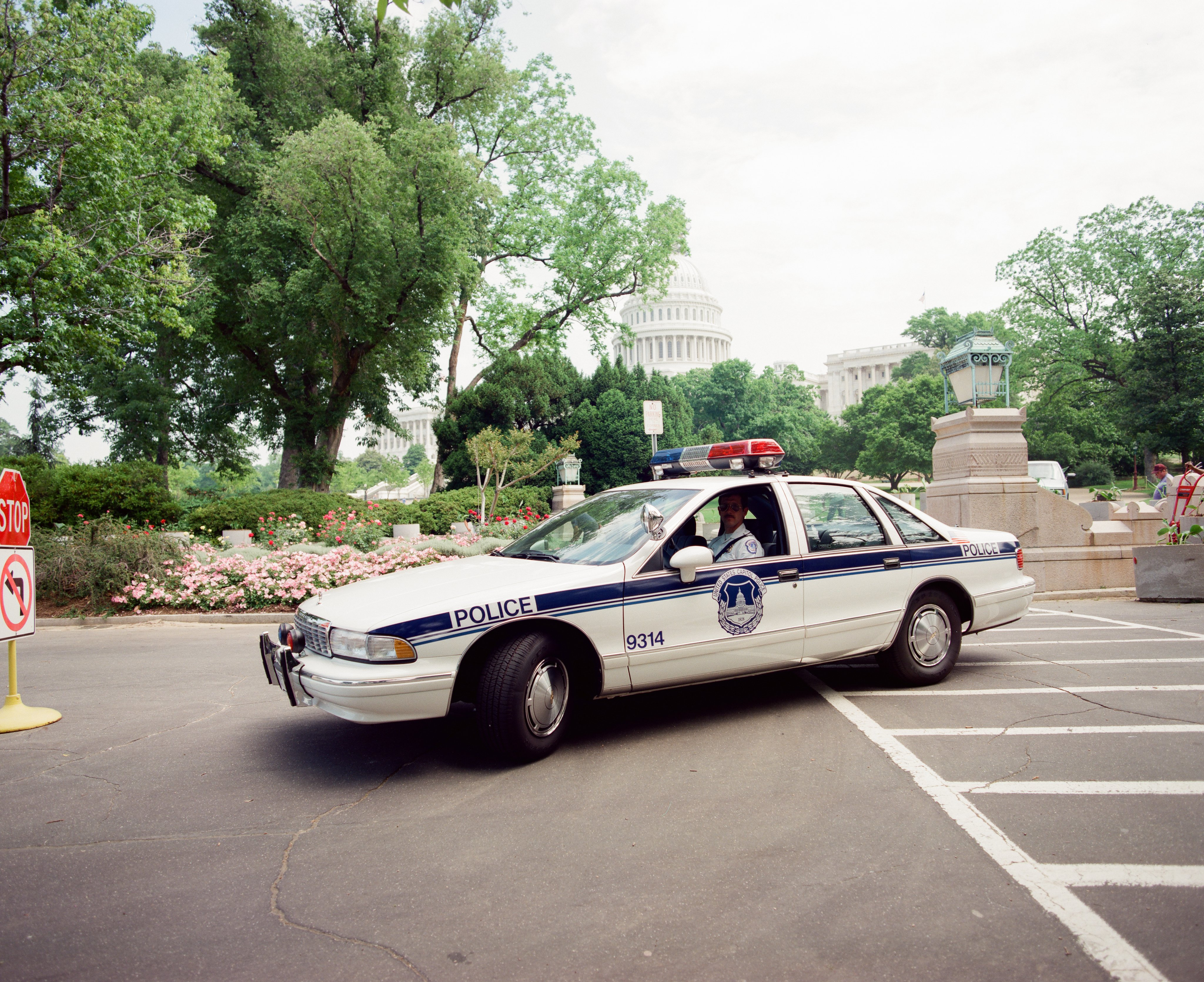
A USCP Caprice in the 1990s

Its mission has expanded to provide the congressional community and its visitors with a variety of security services. These services are provided through the use of a variety of specialty support units, a network of foot and vehicular patrols, fixed posts, a full-time Containment and Emergency Response Team (CERT), K-9, a Patrol/Mobile Response Division and a full-time Hazardous Devices and Hazardous Materials Sections.

In 1979, the Capitol Police got a separate chief of police; the role had previously been filled by officers of the Metropolitan Police Department.

In 2005 Congress established the United States Capitol Police (USCP) Office of Inspector General (OIG) as a legislative agency. The inspector general heads OIG, supervises and conducts audits, inspections, and investigations involving USCP programs, functions, systems, and operations, and reports directly to the Capitol Police Board.

The Library of Congress Police were merged into the force in 2009.

Prior to 2021, four Capitol police officers had died in the line of duty.

=== 1998 shooting at the Capitol ===
On July 24, 1998, a shooting occurred at a security checkpoint inside the Capitol, killing one U.S. Capitol police officer. Another Capitol Police officer was killed when the assailant entered Majority Whip Tom DeLay's (R-TX-22) office.

=== Racial discrimination ===
Since 2001, more than 250 Black officers have sued the Capitol Police over allegations of racism. After the 2021 storming of the Capitol by a pro-Trump mob, several Capitol police were suspended for possible complicity with the rioters.

Even though Washington, D.C. is 46% Black, only 32.5% of the Capitol Police is. This is in contrast to the Metropolitan Police Department (for D.C.), which is 52% Black. (However, this 32.5% is higher than both the 24.8% rate in the wider metro DC/MD/VA area and the 12.3% in the country.)

=== January 2021 Capitol attack ===
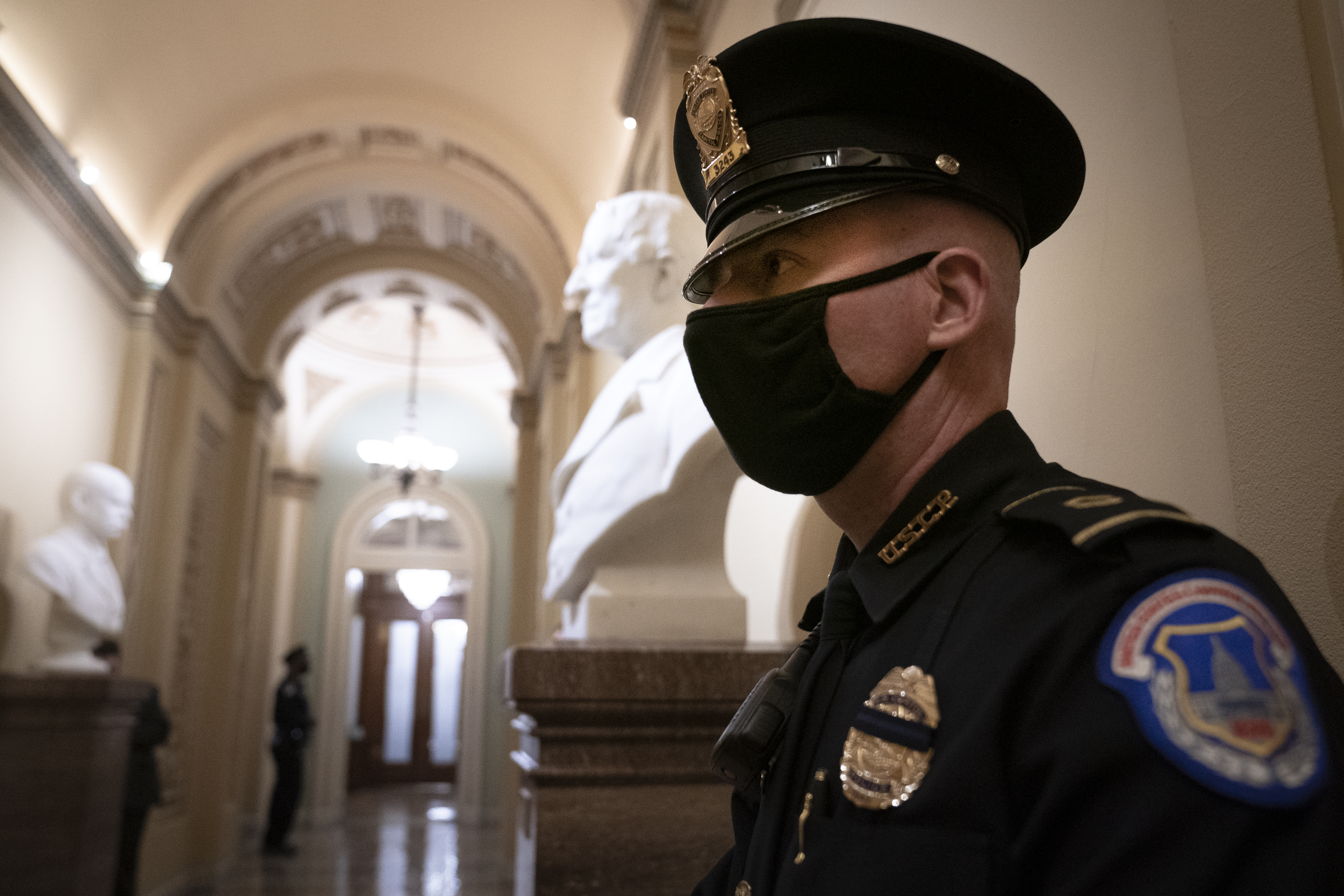
An officer stands guard in 2021

At a rally in Washington on January 6, 2021, Trump's lawyer Rudy Giuliani called for "trial by combat". Trump encouraged his supporters to "fight like hell" and "take back our country", and asked his supporters to march to the US Capitol. Eventually the building was easily stormed with little resistance. Congress was in session at the time, conducting the Electoral College vote count and debating the results of the vote.

The rioters breached barricades erected by Capitol Police around the Capitol. Ultimately, one unarmed woman, Ashli Babbitt, was fatally shot by a USCP officer when she attempted to climb through a shattered window in a barricaded door, and three other rioters died in medical emergencies. One USCP police officer was also injured during the attack, with another officer who responded to the attack dying off-duty days later. More than fifty USCP and MPD officers were injured during the attack, and several USCP officers were hospitalized with serious injuries.

Federal authorities said they were not prepared for the unrest; however, far-right pro-Trump supporters had organized the unrest on pro-Trump far-right social media websites, including Gab and Parler, in advance. The ineffectiveness of Capitol Police's response to the rioting was harshly criticized, as was the contrast between it and the aggressive response of federal law enforcement to the George Floyd protests in the summer of 2020. Law enforcement was urged "to avoid the type of show of force that had inflamed tense situations in the city last year."

At the behest of the speaker of the House of Representatives, Capitol Police chief Steven Sund announced his resignation the following day, effective January 16, 2021. Two other officers were also suspended in January 2021. Six Capitol Police officers were suspended and 29 more were being investigated in February 2021.

Assistant Chief Yogananda Pittman was named acting chief of Capitol Police following the attack. She was the first woman and first African American to lead the agency. Pittman served in an acting capacity until July 22, 2021, when she was replaced by J. Thomas Manger.

=== April 2021 Capitol car attack ===
On April 2, 2021, a suspect identified as Noah Green used a car to hit two Capitol Police officers and then hit a barricade. Officer William "Billy" Evans died and the other officer was hospitalized. Officers shot and killed the suspect. The Capitol was locked down. Green said on social media that he believed he was a victim of "mind control".

== Organizational structure ==
The agency is led by an executive team with the chief of police at the head, who is supported by an assistant chief of police for uniformed operations, and a chief administrative officer. There are about 18 bureaus and offices and an inspector general. Due to threats and other security measures in the wake of the 2021 United States Capitol attack, the agency announced plans to open field offices in California and Florida on July 6. Congress has enabled joint oversight of the Capitol Police Board and given the chief of the Capitol Police emergency powers to request national guard or other federal assistance in cases of civil disturbance.

== Rank structure and insignia ==
Title	Insignia
Chief of Police	Four stars
Assistant Chief of Police	Three stars
Chief of Operations	Three stars
Deputy Chief	Two stars
Inspector	One Oak leaf
Captain	Two bars connected
Lieutenant	One bar
Sergeant	Three chevrons
Corporal	Two chevrons
Private First Class	One chevron over rocker
Private with training	One chevron
Private	No Insignia

== See also ==
- 2021 storming of the United States Capitol
- Congressional baseball shooting
- Shooting of Miriam Carey (2013)
- March 29, 2006, Capitol Hill police incident
- 1998 United States Capitol shooting
- List of incidents of political violence in Washington, D.C.
- List of United States federal law enforcement agencies
- Capitol police
