= Library of Congress Police =

United States law enforcement agency

Library of Congress Police Force
- United States Library of Congress Police patch
- Common name: LC Police

Agency overview
- Formed: 1950
- Dissolved: September 30, 2009
- Superseding agency: United States Capitol Police

Jurisdictional structure
- Federal agency (Operations jurisdiction): United States
- Operations jurisdiction: United States
- Legal jurisdiction: Library of Congress
- General nature: Federal law enforcement; Civilian police
- Specialist jurisdiction: Buildings and lands occupied or explicitly controlled by the institution and the institution's personnel, and public entering the buildings and precincts of the institution

Library of Congress Police was a federal law enforcement agency of the Library of Congress in Washington, D.C., headed by the Office of the Librarian. The agency was formed in 1950. In 2004 the Police employed 116 officers.

Library of Congress Police officers provided facility security through uniformed patrols and video surveillance as well as law enforcement services through arrest authority granted by the United States Congress.

In 2009, the Library Of Congress police were merged into the United States Capitol Police. The U.S. Capitol Police now protects Library of Congress buildings.

== Merger ==
In 2003, Congress decided to begin to abolish the LOC Police force, transferring the officers and the agency's duties, responsibilities and functions into the United States Capitol Police. Pursuant to Public Law 108-7 Sec. 1015 (117 Stat. 363) put into effect by the U.S. Congress on February 20, 2003, the Library of Congress Police was transferred to the authority of the U.S. Capitol Police, and all sections under Title 2 (§ 167 and § 167h) of the U.S. Code that pertains to the Library of Congress Police was transferred to the U.S. Capitol Police. On September 30, 2009, the merger was completed, and the Library of Congress Police have been merged into the U.S. Capitol Police to create one police force. On September 30th, 2009, the Library of Congress police ceased operations. The duties previously performed by them were assumed by the U.S. Capitol Police.

== See also ==
- List of United States federal law enforcement agencies
