= Congressional baseball shooting =

2017 mass shooting in Virginia, U.S.

Congressional baseball practice shooting
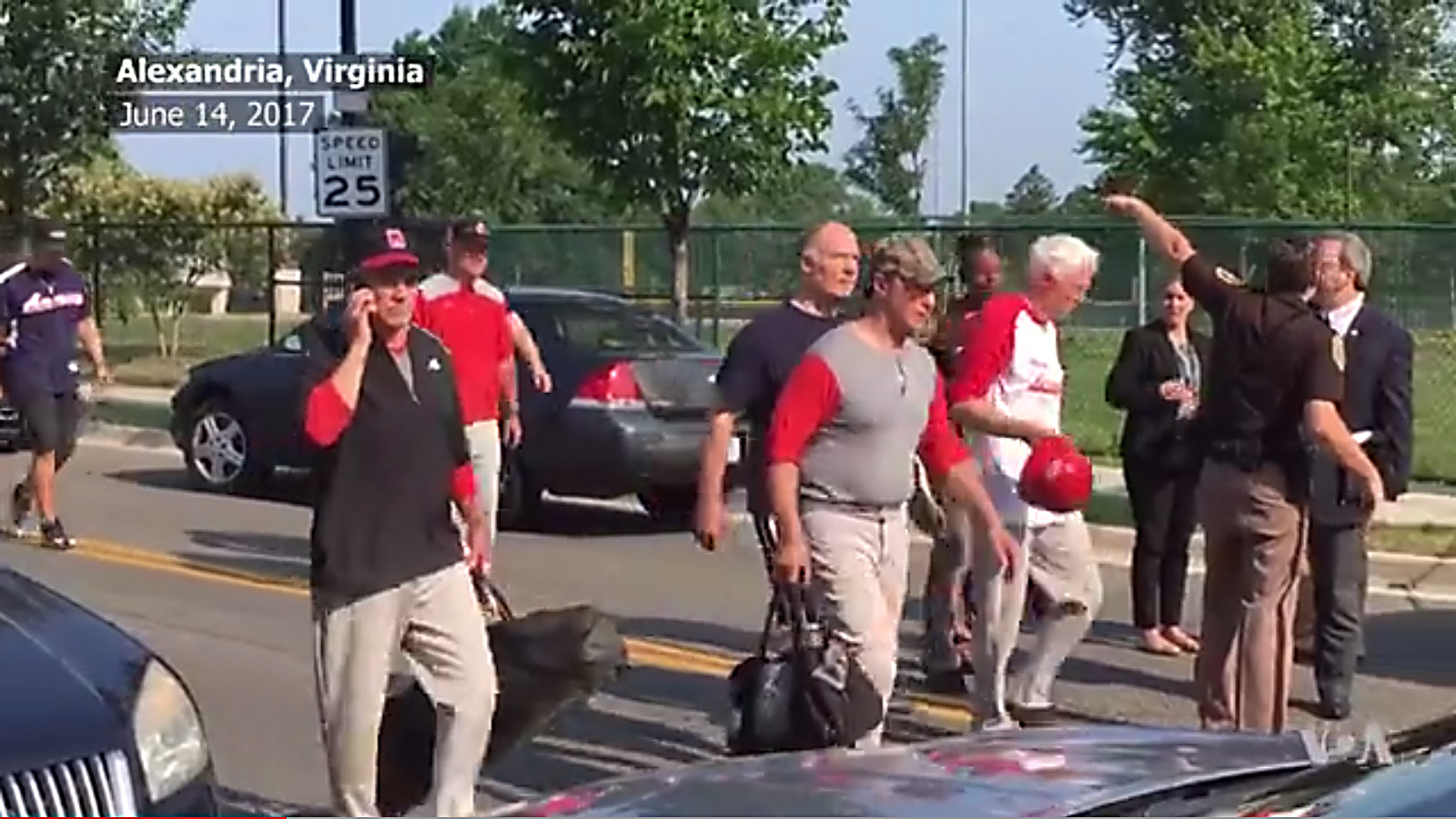
- A scene from the aftermath of the shooting
- Location: 38°49′18″N 77°3′12″W; Alexandria, Virginia, U.S.
- Date: June 14, 2017; 7:06 – 7:15 a.m. (EDT)
- Target: Republican Party congressmen
- Attack type: Assassination attempt, mass shooting, attempted mass murder, domestic terrorism
- Weapons: Century Arms SKS semi-automatic rifle; 9mm Smith & Wesson M&P Shield semi-automatic pistol
- Deaths: 1 (the perpetrator)
- Injuries: 6 (4 by gunfire); 2 of them critically
- Perpetrator: James T. Hodgkinson
- Motive: Opposition to the first election of Donald Trump

On June 14, 2017, a mass shooting occurred during a practice session for the annual Congressional Baseball Game in Alexandria, Virginia, US. 66-year-old James T. Hodgkinson shot four people, including then U.S. House Majority Whip Steve Scalise, U.S. Capitol Police officer Crystal Griner, congressional aide Zack Barth, and lobbyist Matt Majka. A ten-minute shootout took place between Hodgkinson and officers from the Capitol and Alexandria Police before officers shot Hodgkinson, who died from his wounds later that day at the George Washington University Hospital. Scalise and Majka were taken to nearby hospitals where they underwent surgery, and subsequently recovered.

Hodgkinson was a left-wing activist with a record of domestic violence from Belleville, Illinois, while Scalise was a Republican Party member of Congress. The Virginia attorney general Mark Herring concluded Hodgkinson's attack was "an act of terrorism ... fueled by rage against Republican legislators." Scalise was the first sitting member of Congress to have been shot since Democratic Arizona representative Gabby Giffords in the 2011 Tucson shooting. After initially designating the attack as "suicide by cop" the FBI later classified the shooting as an act of domestic terrorism, and the perpetrator of the shooting as a "domestic violent extremist" with a "personalized violent ideology".

== Background ==
The shooting took place on June 14, 2017, at Eugene Simpson Stadium Park in Alexandria, Virginia, across the Potomac River from Washington, D.C. There were 24 Republican congressmen who had gathered at the park to practice for the next day's Congressional Baseball Game for Charity, an annual, bipartisan event first held in 1909. Among those at the practice, aside from Scalise, were senators Rand Paul and Jeff Flake, and Representatives Roger Williams (the team's coach), Chuck Fleischmann, Trent Kelly, Mo Brooks, Brad Wenstrup, Rodney Davis, Jeff Duncan, Jack Bergman, Mike Bishop and Joe Barton (the team's manager).

Prior to the game, the Republicans had held practices at the same time and place each morning. The team began its practice around 6:30 a.m. EDT that day. According to representatives Ron DeSantis and Jeff Duncan, they were approached before the shooting at the practice by a man who asked whether Republicans or Democrats were practicing on the field. Duncan reportedly replied that it was the Republican team. DeSantis later told reporters that both he and Duncan believe that the man was the perpetrator of the shooting, James T. Hodgkinson. Three U.S. Capitol Police officers were present at the practice to protect Scalise, who, due to his House leadership position, had a full-time security detail assigned to protect him. They were posted behind the first-base dugout on that day.

== Shooting ==
Senator Jeff Flake recounts the incident to a Voice of America reporter.

The practice had been underway for about half an hour when Hodgkinson began firing. According to the Capitol Police, he was armed with an SKS rifle and a 9mm Smith & Wesson handgun, both of which he had purchased legally. He had two 40-round magazines for the SKS rifle and two eight-round magazines for the 9mm handgun. The shooting began when Hodgkinson walked up to the fence next to the third base dugout. A nearby gate next to Hodgkinson's position was padlocked on the day of the shooting, preventing him from entering the field. He pointed the SKS at the congressmen and opened fire from outside the fence.

After hearing gunshots, Officers David Bailey and Crystal Griner, who were positioned behind the first base dugout, got out of their SUV vehicle to engage Hodgkinson. Bailey ran onto the field to protect the congressmen and the other civilians, while Griner took cover near the SUV to assist a wounded Matt Mika, who was dropped off by his teammates. While near the first base dugout, Bailey noticed Hodgkinson firing at him and fired 10 rounds from his department-issued .40 caliber Glock 23 at him.

While not hitting him, the shots caused Hodgkinson's aim to become less accurate. During that time, a third officer, Henry Cabrera, took aim at Hodgkinson from behind the first base dugout without firing. After the shots from Bailey, Hodgkinson sought cover behind the third base dugout before quickly moving toward a blue storage building near the press box and home plate. Hodgkinson fired 33 rounds in total from his SKS rifle near the third base dugout, wounding three of the players.

Bailey ran back to the SUV while Griner opened fire at Hodgkinson, who had just emerged from behind the press box and began shooting at the officers. Bailey joined his partner in shooting at Hodgkinson after taking cover behind the SUV. Hodgkinson took cover behind the blue storage building and continued exchanging fire with the two officers. During the shootout, Hodgkinson shot Griner in the left ankle when it was exposed from behind the SUV. Griner would eventually stop shooting at Hodgkinson due to her injury and focus on continuing to triage Mika.

At 7:09 am, the Alexandria Police received a 9-1-1 report of shots fired. Officer Kevin Jobe arrived within three minutes. He ran towards the SUV to join the shootout, but not before notifying two additional officers to stop their cruisers through the radio. The officers, Nicole Battaglia and Alexander Jensen, arrived at 7:13 am and got out of their cruisers after receiving Jobe's message. Battaglia drew her Glock handgun and tried running through the baseball field parking lot, only to be shot at by Hodgkinson. She quickly took cover behind one of the parked vehicles.

After hearing the shots fired at Battaglia, Jensen took cover behind his cruiser and retrieved his department-issued Bushmaster XM-15 rifle. From behind the front of his cruiser, Jensen saw Hodgkinson aiming at the SUV, aimed at him with his rifle, and tried firing, only to realize he left the safety on. After turning off the safety, he fired a single round at Hodgkinson. The round missed, and Jensen quickly moved behind the rear of his cruiser, thinking Hodgkinson saw him. He then tried firing a round at Hodgkinson again; this bullet entered Hodgkinson's right hip and became lodged in the soft tissue of his right lower abdomen. The shot caused Hodgkinson to partially collapse and drop his rifle.

Hodgkinson stood back up and unholstered his 9mm handgun. He began walking towards the SUV while firing at Bailey, Griner, and Jobe with the handgun. Jobe moved closer to Hodgkinson, firing four rounds at him from his Glock 22 pistol. Bailey joined Jobe and fired at Hodgkinson as well. During the gunfire, one of Bailey's rounds struck the left side of Hodgkinson's chest, causing him to rotate with his left side being exposed to Jensen.

From behind the front of his cruiser, Jensen fired a third shot from his rifle at Hodgkinson, hitting him in the rear of his left hip. The bullet caused significant damage to his internal organs and caused him to fully collapse. Jobe and Battaglia ran towards Hodgkinson, who was trying to stand up and reach for his dropped pistol. Jobe placed him in handcuffs and declared the shooter to be in custody at 7:15 am. Hodgkinson was given life-saving measures by other officers and transported to a hospital via helicopter, only to die from his injuries at the hospital.

Witnesses estimated between 50 and 100 shots were fired during the shootout, which lasted about 10 minutes before Hodgkinson was mortally wounded by the shots fired by Jensen and Bailey. An autopsy revealed that Hodgkinson died from multiple gunshot wounds to the torso. During an investigation by the Commonwealth's Attorney, it was determined that Hodgkinson fired 70 rounds in total: 62 from the SKS rifle (33 near the third base dugout and 29 near the blue storage building) and eight from the 9mm Smith & Wesson handgun. Four responding officers fired 42 shots in total: 26 from Bailey, nine from Griner, four from Jobe, and three from Jensen.

Scalise, who was at second base when the shooting started, was shot in the hip and tried to drag himself off the field. While the shooting was still going on, Representative Mo Brooks used his belt as a tourniquet to help stop bleeding for a staffer who had been shot in the calf. After the shooting ended, Brooks and Representative Brad Wenstrup—a podiatrist and U.S. Army Reservist who served with the U.S. Army's 344th Combat Support Hospital—were able to assist Scalise. Several witnesses said their lives were saved by the presence of the Capitol Police, who were there because of Scalise's position as the House Majority Whip. The Capitol Police immediately engaged Hodgkinson and kept him pinned down, preventing him from continuing to fire on the unarmed baseball players. Representative Davis and Senator Rand Paul separately said that if not for the presence of the officers, the incident "would have been a massacre".

== Injuries ==
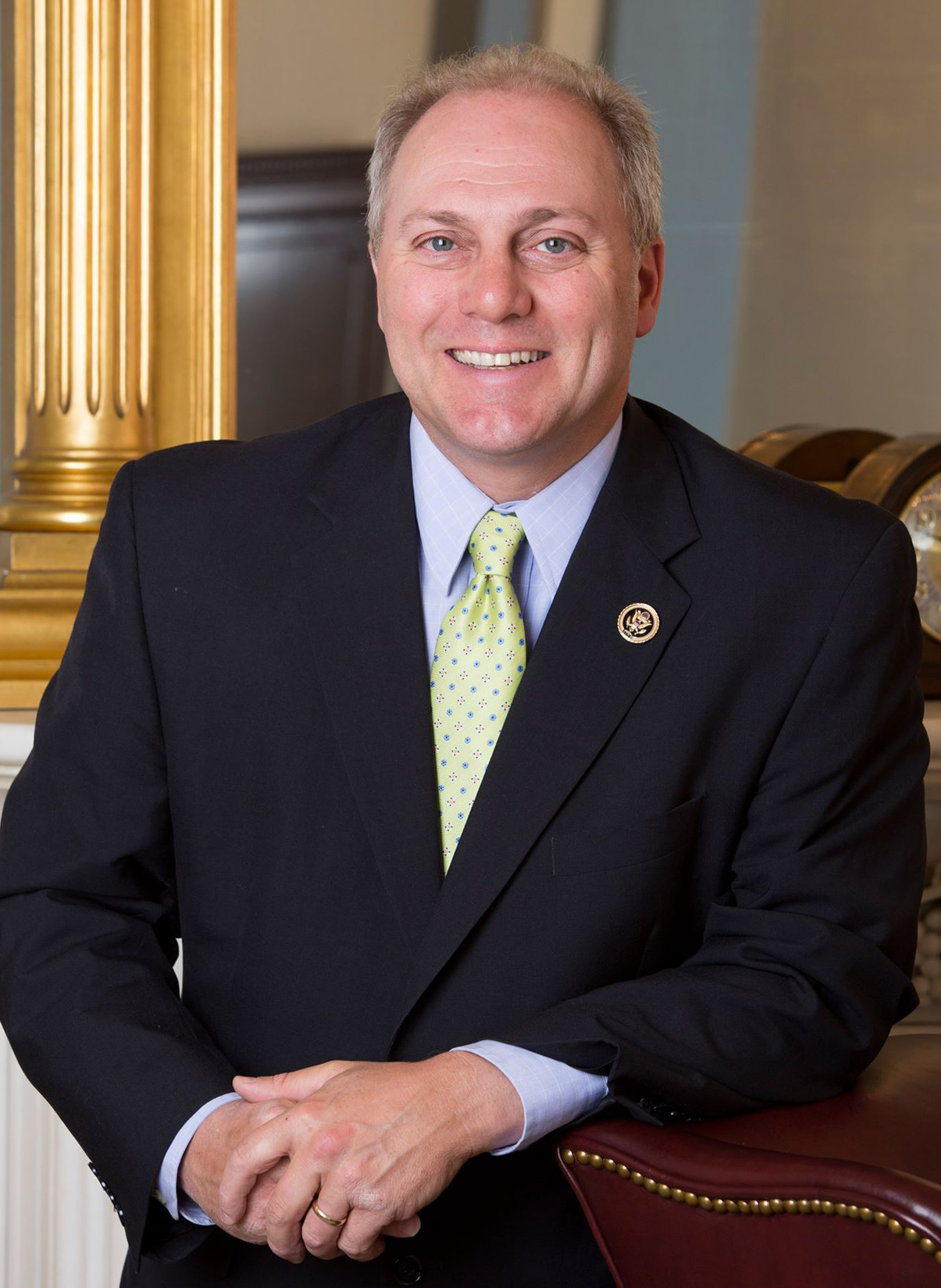
Steve Scalise, one of the victims

Scalise was shot in the hip and was evacuated by a U.S. Park Police helicopter to MedStar Washington Hospital Center, where he underwent surgery. The hospital reported that after the bullet struck his hip, it traveled across his pelvis—fracturing bones, injuring internal organs, and causing severe bleeding. His condition was initially listed as "critical". He received multiple blood transfusions and underwent several surgeries to repair internal damage and stop the bleeding. His condition was improved to "serious" on June 17. It further improved to "fair" on June 21, though he was readmitted to intensive care on July 5 due to concerns of infection.

Matt Mika, a Tyson Foods lobbyist, was shot multiple times in the chest and arm, injuring his lungs, sternum, and ribs. When he was shot, he was standing near first base. He is a former baseball player and former legislative assistant for Congressmen Tim Walberg and Dave Camp, both Republicans from Michigan. Paramedics from the Alexandria Fire Department labeled Mika as the most severely wounded, a red case, and he was taken to the George Washington University Hospital via ambulance where he underwent surgery for his injuries. He was in critical condition immediately following surgery. The day after the shooting, his condition was upgraded from critical to serious. On June 23, he was released from the hospital.

David Bailey and Crystal Griner, two of the Capitol Police officers assigned to protect Scalise, were both injured. Griner was shot in the ankle and was hospitalized in what was described as good condition. Bailey was treated and released after sustaining a minor injury not caused by gunfire. Zack Barth, a legislative aide to Representative Roger Williams of Texas, was shot in the calf. He was standing in center field when the shooting began. He was treated at the hospital and released. Representative Williams, a former Minor League Baseball player and coach of the Republican team, sprained his ankle while jumping into a dugout during the attack to avoid being shot. He used a crutch for support for a few weeks after.

== Perpetrator ==
Police identified the shooter as James Thomas Hodgkinson (December 12, 1950 – June 14, 2017), 66 years old, whose last permanent residence was in Belleville, Illinois, where he lived for the entirety of his life, having been born in neighboring East St. Louis. In 1988, he married his wife, who was an office manager at a tax preparation firm at the time of his death. As an adult, he was politically active; according to a former attorney of his, he "never did anything violent". He was severely injured in the shootout and transported to the George Washington University Hospital, where he died from his injuries.

The sheriff of St. Clair County, said that deputies had been called to Hodgkinson's house about half a dozen times in the past 20 years. His earliest charge dates back to 1993 when he was accused of attempting to elude police, resisting arrest, and drunk driving. In 2006, Hodgkinson was accused of beating his foster daughter and he was arrested and charged with domestic battery and unlawful discharge of a shotgun, but the case was dismissed when the alleged victim decided not to testify. Had Hodgkinson been convicted, he would have been unable to legally purchase firearms. He pleaded guilty to a 2007 speeding offence, driving 15 to 20 miles per hour over the limit, according to court records in Jefferson County. The most recent conviction on his record was in 2009 for failure to obtain an electrical contractor's license.

In March 2017, a neighbor called police to complain about Hodgkinson firing a rifle at trees in their residential neighborhood. The officers who responded checked Hodgkinson's gun permit, then advised him not to shoot in the area but did not arrest him after he complied. Hodgkinson owned a home inspection business that had an expired license at the time of the shooting. Investigators believe that he had been living in a white cargo van in Alexandria for about six weeks at the time of the shooting. Witnesses say he often parked the van near the ball field and nearby YMCA, and was a frequent visitor to the YMCA.

He was a regular customer at the Pork Barrel BBQ, a bar in Del Ray. According to the bar's manager, Hodgkinson had frequented the watering hole sporadically for the past few months, drinking Budweiser in the can and watching golf on TV. According to Tim Slater of the FBI's Washington, D.C., field office, Hodgkinson was "running out of money. He was not employed at the time of the event, and he was looking for some local employment. He was married for 30 years, and it appears that that marriage was not going very well. It was just a pattern of life where you could tell things were not going well."

=== Motives ===
Hodgkinson had participated in the Bernie Sanders 2016 presidential campaign, and was described by a fellow campaigner in Iowa as a "quiet guy, very mellow, very reserved". Republican Congressman Mike Bost, who represents Hodgkinson's home district, said Hodgkinson had contacted his office ten times but "never with any threats, only anger". He wrote 27 letters to the editor of the Belleville News-Democrat between March 2008 and September 2012 on various political and economic topics, many of which were anti-Republican.

On May 22, 2017, Hodgkinson wrote "Trump is a Traitor. Trump Has Destroyed Our Democracy. It's Time to Destroy Trump & Co." above his repost of a Change.org petition demanding "the legal removal" of Donald Trump and Vice President Mike Pence for "treason". He belonged to numerous political Facebook groups, including those named "Terminate the Republican Party", "The Road To Hell Is Paved With Republicans", and "Donald Trump is not my President."

The Federal Bureau of Investigation (FBI), which took over the investigation, said on June 14 that it was too early to ascribe a motive for the shootings. It put out a request for public assistance with "any information regarding Hodgkinson". On June 16, USA Today reported, citing an anonymous source, that the FBI found a list of names, including those of Republican Congressmen Mo Brooks, Jeff Duncan and Trent Franks, in Hodgkinson's pocket. On June 21, FBI agent Timothy Slater said the names of six congressmen were written on a piece of paper found in an Alexandria storage locker rented to Hodgkinson. He said it did not appear to be a hit list, and that its significance was unclear.

== Reactions ==
Senator Bernie Sanders's reaction to news that the gunman was a volunteer for his 2016 campaign

The attack drew a bipartisan response as many politicians immediately sent out notes expressing their anger over the shooting, recovery wishes for the injured and gratitude for the police. News of the shooting and injuries quickly reached the Democratic Congressional Baseball players, who were at their own practice at another location when the shooting occurred. They gathered together in the dugout to pray for the injured.

President Trump addressed the nation saying, "We are deeply saddened by this tragedy. Our thoughts and prayers are with the members of Congress, their staffs, Capitol Police, first responders, and all others affected." He and his wife, Melania Trump, visited Scalise and Griner in the hospital. While at the hospital, the Trumps spoke with Scalise's family and with Griner and her wife. On July 27, 2017, Trump awarded the Public Safety Officer Medal of Valor to five of the officers who were injured in the shooting.

Speaker of the U.S. House Paul Ryan (R–WI) addressed the U.S. House of Representatives before their afternoon session and said, "An attack on one of us is an attack on all of us." Members of both parties rose in applause to his remarks. Former Representative Gabby Giffords (D–AZ), who survived the 2011 Tucson shooting, sent a tweet that read "My heart is with my former colleagues, their families and staff, and the US Capitol Police—public servants and heroes today and every day."

Hours after the shooting, Senator Bernie Sanders responded on the U.S. Senate floor to news that Hodgkinson was a campaign volunteer for his 2016 U.S. presidential election run:

"I have just been informed that the alleged shooter at the Republican baseball practice is someone who apparently volunteered on my presidential campaign. I am sickened by this despicable act. Let me be as clear as I can be, violence of any kind is unacceptable in our society and I condemn this action in the strongest possible terms. Real change can only come about through nonviolent action, and anything else runs counter to our most deeply held American values."

Reactions to the shooting among political activists were split. Some liberals, such as Virginia Governor Terry McAuliffe, called for stricter gun control laws, while some Republicans, such as Congressman Chris Collins, blamed anti-Trump rhetoric. Other activists blamed growing national political polarization, as reported by the Pew Research Center, for causing the shooting.

== Increased ticket sales ==
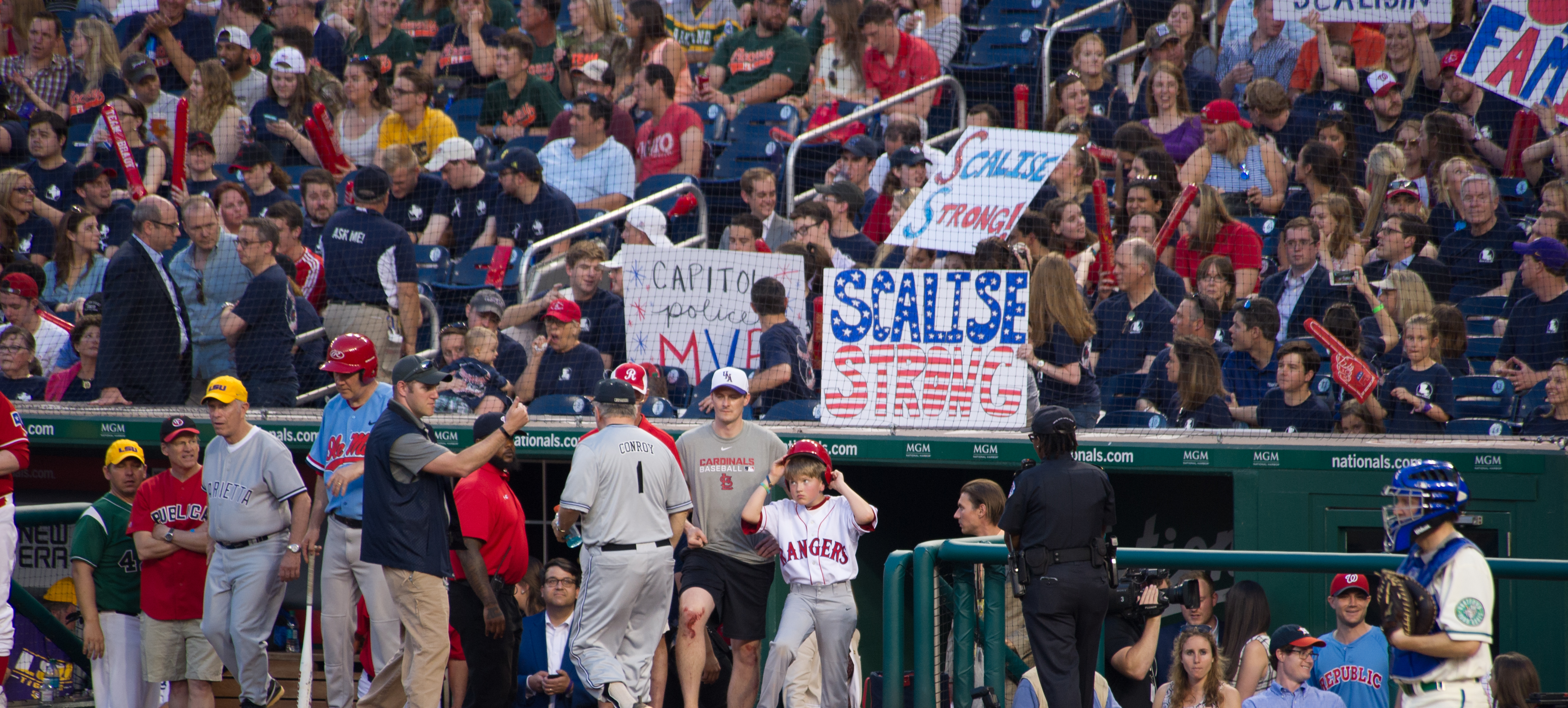
Scalise supporters at the Congressional Baseball Game. Then-Representative Ron DeSantis is in the bottom left.

External videos
- 2017 Congressional Baseball Game, June 15, 2017, C-SPAN

Congressional leaders announced on the afternoon of June 14 that the Congressional Baseball Game, which is played for charity, would take place as scheduled the next day.

The annual game usually attracted a crowd of about 10,000 people, but after the shooting, more than 20,000 tickets were sold, bringing in more than $1 million for charity. David Bailey, one of the two Capitol Police officers injured in the shootout, threw out the first pitch. Relying on crutches because of his injury, he received a standing ovation from the crowd of 24,959 in Nationals Park. Many players of both parties wore Louisiana State University hats with their uniforms as a tribute to Scalise. While the Democratic team defeated the Republican team 11–2, they loaned the trophy to the Republicans until Scalise finished his recovery.

== See also ==
- 1954 United States Capitol shooting
- 1998 United States Capitol shooting
- 2010 Pentagon shooting
- 2011 Tucson shooting
- Family Research Council shooting
- 2021 storming of the United States Capitol
- Attack on Paul Pelosi
- Attempted assassination of Donald Trump in Pennsylvania
- Attempted assassination of Donald Trump in Florida
- 2025 shootings of Minnesota legislators
- Assassination of Charlie Kirk
- Domestic terrorism in the United States
- Stochastic terrorism
- List of incidents of political violence in Washington, D.C.
- List of members of the United States Congress killed or wounded in office
- October 2018 United States mail bombing attempts
- Shooting of Miriam Carey (2013)
- Solomon Peña
