= 1998 United States Capitol shooting =

Fatal attack in Washington, D.C.

- Location: Washington, D.C., US
- Date: July 24, 1998; 28 years ago 3:40 p.m. – 3:45 p.m. (UTC-4)
- Target: United States Capitol
- Attack type: Mass shooting
- Weapon: .38 caliber Smith & Wesson revolver
- Deaths: 2
- Injuries: 3 (including the perpetrator)
- Perpetrator: Russell Eugene Weston Jr.

The 1998 United States Capitol shooting occurred on July 24, 1998, when Russell Eugene Weston Jr. entered the Capitol and fatally shot United States Capitol Police officers Jacob Chestnut and Detective John Gibson.

Gibson died during surgery at MedStar Washington Hospital Center; Chestnut died at George Washington University Hospital. Weston's exact motives are unknown, but he had expressed strong distrust of the federal government of the United States. He was diagnosed with paranoid schizophrenia six years before the attack. Weston was later charged on July 26 for the murder of two U.S. Capitol Police officers during the shooting rampage. As of July 2018, Weston remained in a mental institution.

== Shooting ==
On the day of the shooting, Officer Chestnut and an unarmed civilian security aide were assigned to operate the X-ray machine and magnetometer at the Document Door entrance located on the East Front of the Capitol, which was open only to Members of Congress and their staff. Detective Gibson was assigned to the dignitary protection detail of then House Majority Whip Tom DeLay (R-TX) and was in his suite of offices near this door. Weston, armed with a .38 caliber Smith & Wesson six-shot revolver, entered the Document Door at 3:40 p.m. At the same time, Officer Chestnut was providing directions to a tourist and his son. Weston walked through the metal detector, setting off the alarm. Chestnut requested he go back through the detector. Weston suddenly produced the gun and without warning, shot Chestnut in the back of the head at point-blank range. At this time, Officer Douglas McMillan, normally working outside the Capitol, was nearby retrieving keys to get a wheelchair for a tourist. Officer McMillan immediately returned fire as Weston shot Chestnut, causing Weston to shoot toward McMillan, wounding him. Weston then ran away from McMillan, turning into the first nearby open door he found. McMillan could not shoot at Weston without risking hitting the many civilians in the immediate area. According to witnesses, Weston turned down a short corridor. He pushed through a door that led to a group of offices used by senior Republican representatives, including then-House Majority Whip Tom DeLay and Representative Dennis Hastert, future Speaker of the House and a close protégé of then Speaker Newt Gingrich.

Upon hearing the gunfire, Detective Gibson, who was in plain clothes, told the office staff to hide under their desks. Weston entered the office and quickly shot Gibson once in the chest. Mortally wounded, Gibson returned fire, shooting Weston four times. Two other officers arrested Weston in the same office. Senator Bill Frist, a heart surgeon who had been presiding on the Senate floor just before the shooting, resuscitated the gunman and accompanied him to D.C. General Hospital.

Angela Dickerson, a tourist, was grazed on her face and shoulder by shrapnel from a marble wall as McMillan's rounds impacted the wall while he was attempting to hit the fleeing Weston. She was treated for her injuries and released.

== Aftermath ==
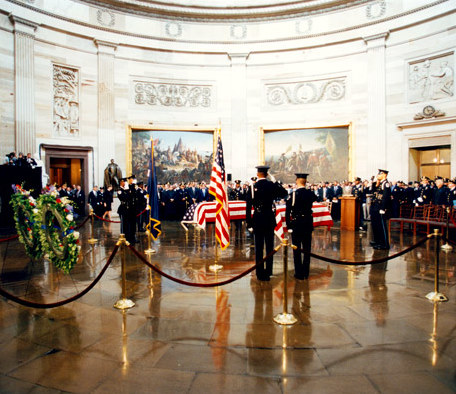
A Capitol Police honor guard salutes the coffins of Officer Jacob Chestnut and Detective John Gibson in the Capitol rotunda as they lie in repose

Officers Chestnut and Gibson were killed in the attack. Both officers received the tribute of lying in honor in the United States Capitol rotunda. They were the first police officers, and Chestnut was the first African American, to receive the honor.

In 1999, Weston was found incompetent to stand trial due to mental illness; he had a history of schizophrenia and had stopped taking his medication. A judge of the United States District Court for the District of Columbia ordered that he be treated with antipsychotic medication without his consent in 2001, and the United States Court of Appeals for the District of Columbia Circuit upheld the decision. In 2004, the court determined that Weston still was not competent to be tried, despite ongoing treatment, and suspended but did not dismiss the criminal charges against him. Weston was known to the United States Secret Service before the incident as a person who had threatened the President of the United States.

The shooting led to the creation of the United States Capitol Police Memorial Fund, a nonprofit organization managed by the Capitol Police Board which provides funds for the families of Chestnut and Gibson. In November 2005, the fund was expanded to include the family of Sgt. Christopher Eney, a USCP officer killed during a training accident in 1984. The shooting was cited as one reason for the development of the Capitol Visitor Center. The legislation authorizing the construction of the facility was introduced by Washington, D.C. Delegate Eleanor Holmes Norton and was entitled the Jacob Joseph Chestnut–John Michael Gibson United States Capitol Visitor Center Act of 1998. The door where Weston entered was renamed in honor of the two officers, from the Document Door to the Chestnut-Gibson Memorial Door.

On March 6, 2008, Weston filed a motion requesting a hearing on his mental status. The hearing was held on May 6 with Weston appearing via teleconference from the Federal Medical Center, Butner with his public defender Jane Pierce and two witnesses he selected, a psychologist and vocational rehabilitation specialist. Federal judge Earl Britt denied Weston's request to be released from the federal facility, arguing that he failed to present enough evidence that he no longer needed to be committed. During the hearing, defense psychologist Holly Rogers stated that "sometimes there are individuals who simply do not respond to medication", implying that Weston was not ready for release. Had Weston been released from the facility, it would have made it possible for him to be taken to Washington, D.C., to stand trial for the murders of Gibson and Chestnut.

On July 24, 2008, members of Congress paused for a moment of silence to mark the shooting's tenth anniversary. On the east lawn of the Capitol, Democratic and Republican lawmakers planted a tree in memory of Gibson and Chestnut.

== Officers ==
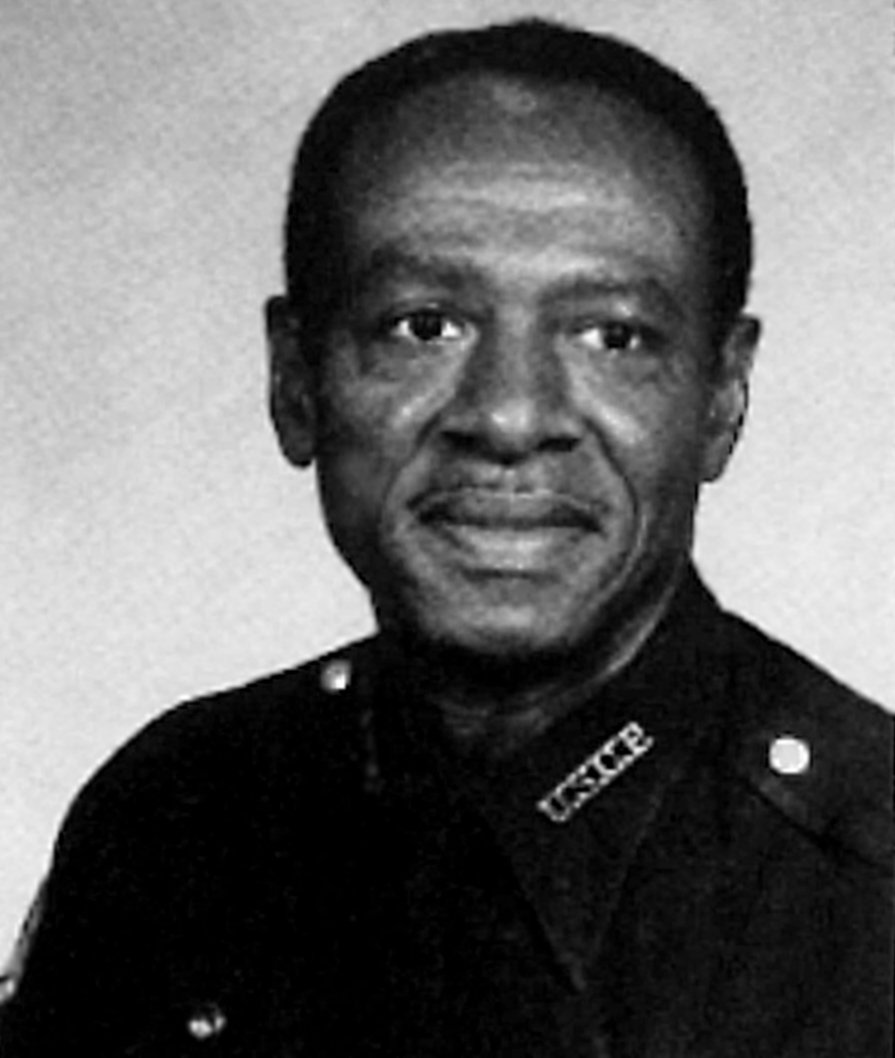
Officer Jacob Chestnut, USCP

Officer Jacob Joseph Chestnut (April 28, 1940 – July 24, 1998) was the first African American to lie in honor at the Capitol. He retired as a master sergeant from the United States Air Force after 20 years of service in the Air Force Security Police. Chestnut's career included two tours in the Vietnam War. Chestnut is buried in Arlington National Cemetery. His funeral included a speech by President Bill Clinton and a fly-over by military jets in a missing man formation. A United States Post Office located in Fort Washington, Maryland, has been renamed in his and Detective John Gibson's honor, as was the building housing the United States Air Force's 20th Security Forces Squadron at Shaw Air Force Base, South Carolina.

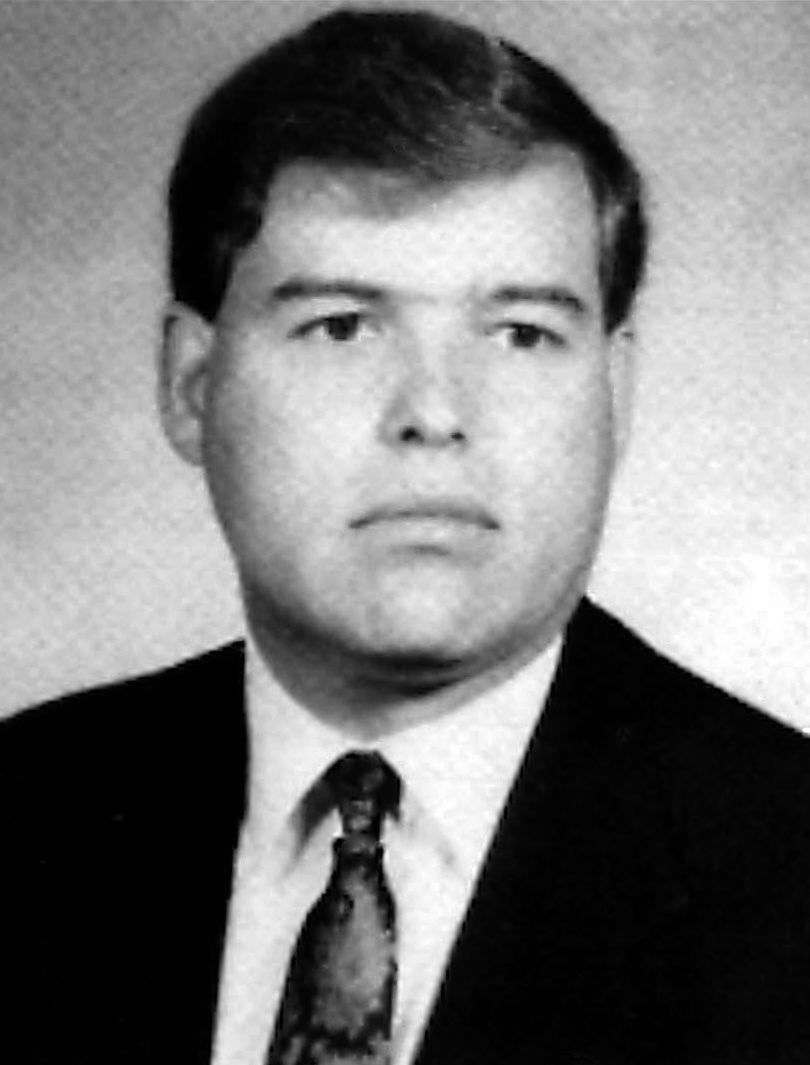
Detective John Gibson, USCP

Detective John Michael Gibson (March 29, 1956 – July 24, 1998) was a United States Capitol Police officer assigned to the dignitary protection detail of Congressman Tom DeLay. He is buried in Arlington National Cemetery after lying in honor with Chestnut in the Capitol rotunda. Gibson had served with the agency for 18 years. He was a native of Massachusetts who married the niece of Representative Joe Moakley. He had three children, a 17-year-old daughter and two boys, ages 15 and 14. Growing up in New England, Gibson was a lifelong Boston Red Sox fan, and on August 11, 1998, the team held a moment of silence in his honor before a game with the Kansas City Royals.

== Perpetrator ==
Russell Eugene Weston Jr. (born December 28, 1956), also known as Rusty, grew up in Valmeyer, Illinois, a town of 900 people. Shortly after graduating from Valmeyer High School in 1974, Weston moved to Rimini, Montana, rarely returning to Valmeyer. His classmates' only attempt at inviting him to a class reunion was returned with obscenities written across it. Many of Weston's Montana neighbors disliked and often ignored him. They considered him to be unusual and sometimes eccentric. Weston had once thought that his neighbor was using his television satellite dish to spy on his actions and believed Navy SEALs were hiding in his cornfield.

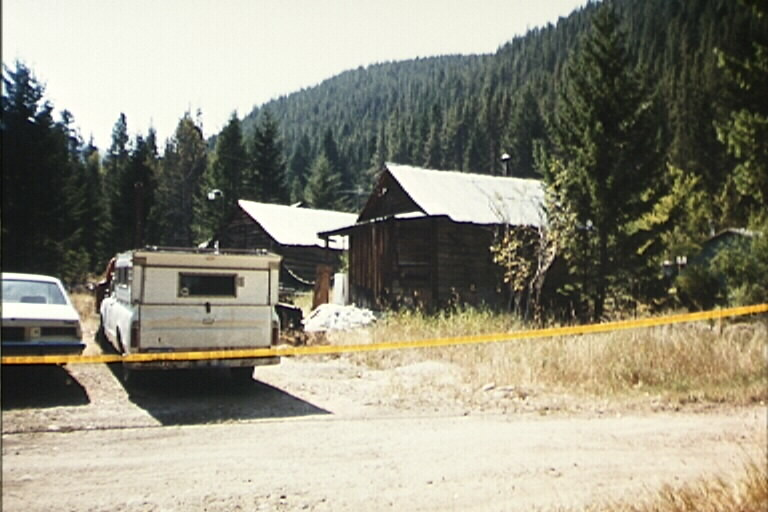
Weston's cabin next to the lower Tenmile Creek in Montana following a search by the police

Weston was diagnosed with paranoid schizophrenia six years before the shooting and spent fifty-three days in a mental hospital after threatening a Montana resident. He was released after testing as no danger to himself or anyone else. Two years before the shooting in July 1996, Weston bought a new suit and set off on a cross-country trip to visit the headquarters of the Central Intelligence Agency (CIA) in McLean, Virginia. He said his operative name was "The Moon" and claimed he had important information for the Director of the CIA. He was taken to a small conference room at the facility and interviewed for 50 minutes, recorded on videotape. During the session, he purported to have been a subject of human cloning, to have intel on a secret government surveillance operation, and to have insider information regarding personal relations between John F. Kennedy and then-president Bill Clinton. Weston was not detained as such claims did not imply violence towards the president. He then left the facility.

Eighteen months before the shooting, he moved back to Valmeyer from Montana. Once home, he was known to compulsively hack at trees that filled his backyard following the Mississippi River floods of 1993. There was so much downed timber on his family's homestead that his father had to ask him to stop cutting down trees. Two days before the Capitol shooting, at his grandmother's insistence to do something about nearby cats which were becoming a nuisance, Weston shot and killed 14 cats with a single-barreled shotgun, leaving several in a bucket and burying the rest. The weapon used in the attack was a 29-year-old (made in 1969) .38-caliber Smith & Wesson six-shot revolver that Weston stole from his father in Illinois.

Following the Capitol shooting, Weston was transferred to a psychiatric center at Butner Federal Correctional Institution in Butner, North Carolina. In an interview with a court-appointed psychiatrist, he explained that he stormed the Capitol to prevent the United States from being annihilated by disease and legions of cannibals.

One contentious issue of Weston's incarceration was that of forced medication. He had refused to take any medications voluntarily, so in May 2001, a federal judge authorized doctors to treat Weston involuntarily. A panel from a federal appeals court ruled in July 2001 that Weston could be forced to take the drugs, which he was then forced to do for 120 days. He remains in the civil commitment indefinitely.

== See also ==
- 1954 United States Capitol shooting
- Killing of Miriam Carey (2013)
- Congressional baseball shooting
- January 6, 2021 United States Capitol attack
- 2021 United States Capitol car attack
- List of incidents of political violence in Washington, D.C.
- List of attacks on legislatures

Honorary titles
Preceded by Claude Pepper	Persons who have lain in state or honor in the United States Capitol rotunda (John Gibson and Jacob Chestnut); June 28, 1998	Succeeded by Ronald Reagan
