= Killing of Miriam Carey =

Shooting by police of woman trespassing near the Capitol

- Date: October 3, 2013
- Location: White House, 1600 Pennsylvania Avenue, Washington, D.C., U.S.
- Type: Killing by law enforcement officers
- Deaths: Miriam Carey
- Injuries: 2 police officers
- Charges: No charges filed

On October 3, 2013, in Washington, D.C., Miriam Carey, a dental hygienist from Stamford, Connecticut, was shot and killed by law enforcement officers after attempting to drive through a White House security checkpoint in her black Infiniti G37 coupe. She struck a U.S. Secret Service officer and was chased by the Secret Service to the United States Capitol where she was shot five times in the back, including one shot which hit the left side of the back of her head. Carey's 18-month-old daughter, who was also in the car, was not injured in the incident.

== Miriam Carey ==
Miriam Iris Carey (August 12, 1979 – October 3, 2013), of Stamford, Connecticut, was a dental hygienist licensed to practice in New York and Connecticut. She was born and raised in Bedford-Stuyvesant, Brooklyn, New York. She obtained an associate degree in dental hygiene from Hostos Community College and graduated from Brooklyn College in 2007 with a degree in health nutrition science.

According to a family spokesman, Carey had previously been hospitalized for postpartum depression. Carey's mother told ABC News that Carey had been depressed since giving birth. Carey's sister attested that she was "not delusional" and had been placed on a one-year medicated treatment plan for her postpartum depression. Steven Oken, her employer for eight years, described Carey as a "non-political person" who was "always happy".

On the day of the incident, Carey was supposed to be taking her daughter to a doctor's appointment in Connecticut. The Federal Bureau of Investigation (FBI) found two medications in her apartment, as well as a laptop, a flash drive and three nonfunctional cell phones. Federal officials said she may have suffered from schizophrenia and bipolar disorder. Federal officials said no weapons were found in the car. Carey's boyfriend reported concerns about her mental health and delusions to the Stamford, Connecticut Police Department. On the night of November 29, 2012, Carey called police saying five men were watching her outside her apartment. The police came and found no evidence to indicate someone was there and listed her as an emotionally disturbed person after. On December 10, 2012, Stamford police were called by Carey’s boyfriend over concerns for his daughter. They investigated the complaint and noted that Carey believed herself to be the "Prophet of Stamford" and insisted that President Barack Obama had her house under electronic surveillance. These police records were released after several media outlets made a Freedom of Information Act request.

== Incident ==
At about 2:12 p.m., an Infiniti G37 driven by Carey allegedly struck one of the White House barriers at the intersection of 15th St. NW and Pennsylvania Avenue NW. At 2:13 p.m. she drove into a restricted White House checkpoint at 15th and E Streets NW, without authorization and without stopping. When an off-duty U.S. Secret Service officer placed himself and a metal bike rack in her path to block her exit, she struck the bike rack and the off-duty Secret Service officer who was standing behind it with her car, knocking both the bike rack and the officer onto the ground. Secret Service attempted to arrest the suspect but she continued to drive the car evasively, colliding with one officer who fell on the hood of the car and rolled off. Carey then drove 40–80 mph down Pennsylvania Avenue, weaving through traffic and ignoring red lights. Police gave chase east on Pennsylvania Avenue for a dozen blocks. The chase then proceeded south on 1st St. NW/SW between Peace Circle and Garfield Circle.

At Garfield Circle, uniformed and plain-clothes Secret Service officers attempted to box the car in with at least five marked vehicles and one unmarked cruiser, on United States Capitol grounds, on the sidewalk on the east side of the circle. Four uniformed and two plainclothes officers proceeded to surround the car on foot with guns drawn, shouting orders. Carey eluded the box-in by backing into the Secret Service cruiser behind her and driving away, striking a Secret Service officer in the process. The suspect proceeded north at high speed, circling Peace Circle twice and then proceeding east on Constitution Avenue. She got as far as the northeast corner of the Capitol grounds, in the vicinity of the Hart Senate Office Building and came upon U.S. Capitol Police Truck Interdiction Point at 2nd St and Maryland Ave NE with raised barriers blocking her path. She then made a sharp left and crossed over the median and struck an unmarked police officer's vehicle that had stopped in front of the Hart Senate Office Building. After ignoring multiple police commands, she revved her engine in reverse at a U.S. Capitol Police Officer who was approaching the vehicle from behind. As the officer ran towards the median to avoid being struck by Carey's vehicle, he and another officer from the U.S. Secret Service started firing. The two officers fired nine rounds each at the vehicle. The vehicle crashed into the kiosk and came to a rest. She was unconscious and did not get out of the vehicle. No officers fired after the vehicle crashed. It was at that time that officers discovered there was a young child in the vehicle, and they safely removed the child from the vehicle.

A shelter in place order was issued for the Capitol building during the incident. A Capitol Police officer was injured when his car hit a barricade during the chase near 1st and Constitution Avenue, and was medevaced by a U.S. Park Police helicopter, call sign "Eagle One" (N22PP), to MedStar Washington Hospital Center with non life-threatening injuries. A Secret Service officer was struck by Carey's car on the White House grounds.

== Aftermath ==
Carey was brought to MedStar Washington Hospital Center and pronounced dead. There was an 18-month-old child, believed to be the victim’s daughter, in the back seat of the car. The child was unharmed and taken to a children's hospital. The FBI obtained a search warrant and conducted a search of the woman's home in Stamford, Connecticut, to try to determine the possible motivation of her actions. As a precaution, a bomb squad robot was used to enter inside Carey's house at 114 Woodside Green.

Both Capitol Police and Washington, D.C. Metropolitan Police revealed that they believed that the incident was isolated and not part of a terrorist plot. Miriam Carey's sisters have questioned police actions in this chase. In February 2014, Carey's family officially announced a wrongful death claim against the U.S. Capitol Police and the Secret Service. Carey's U-Turn at the White House check point and her subsequent path away from the building was captured on video by Al Hurra TV videographer Danny Farkas which was used during the news cycle following her death, as well as evidence in the US Attorney's Office investigation. Footage from this video has been used to justify claims that Secret Service used excessive force on Carey. The Secret Service has since refused to release the video of Carey's death.

An autopsy by the DC medical examiner was released in April 2014 and indicated that Carey was shot five times in the back, including one shot which hit the left side of the back of her head. The autopsy listed the manner of death as homicide. On July 10, 2014, the U.S. Attorney's Office announced that no charges would be filed against the federal officers and agents, stating, "After a thorough review of all the evidence, the U.S. Attorney's Office concluded that the evidence was insufficient to prove beyond a reasonable doubt that the officers who were involved in the shooting used excessive force or possessed the requisite criminal intent at the time of the events."

On May 20, 2015, a vigil was held in Union Square, Manhattan as part of the Say Her Name campaign to recognize the lives and deaths of black women killed or injured by police. Miriam Carey's family attended the vigil and her name was highlighted as one of the women to be recognized. Carey's name and story has also been featured in the Say Her Name publication "Resisting Police Brutality Against Black Women". Carey has been mentioned by critics of the Black Lives Matter movement as an example of the perceived lack of intersectionality within the movement, citing the lack of coverage and continued discussion of her death.

== See also ==
- 1954 United States Capitol shooting
- 1998 United States Capitol shooting
- Congressional baseball shooting
- 2021 storming of the United States Capitol
- April 2021 United States Capitol car attack
