= William H. Abendroth =

United States Army general

William Henry Abendroth, Jr.
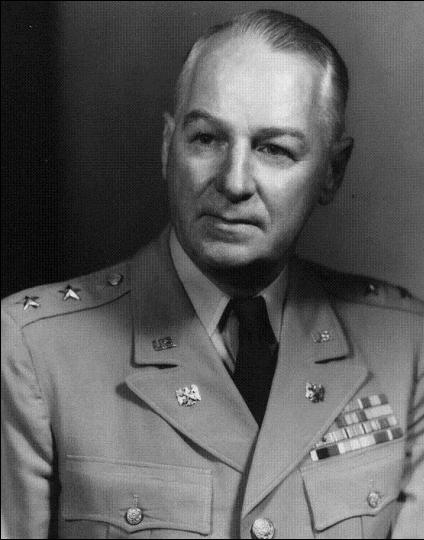
- Abendroth as Chief, Army Division, National Guard Bureau, circa 1952
- Born: December 24, 1895; Fort Meade, South Dakota, US
- Died: September 3, 1970 (aged 74); Washington, D.C., US
- Burial place: Arlington National Cemetery
- Military career
- Allegiance: United States of America
- Branch: United States Army
- Service years: 1913–1919; 1929–1967
- Rank: Major general
- Nickname: Harry
- Units: Idaho Army National Guard; District of Columbia National Guard; National Guard Bureau
- Commands: 116th Cavalry Regiment; Commandant of the IX Corps Officer Candidate School; Commandant of the IX Corps Headquarters; Adjutant General of Idaho; Chief, Army Division, National Guard Bureau; District of Columbia National Guard
- Conflicts: Pancho Villa Expedition; World War I World War II
- Awards: Distinguished Service Medal (U.S. Army); Legion of Merit
- Other work: Purchasing agent, budget director, disbursing officer, State of Idaho

William H. Abendroth (December 24, 1895 – September 3, 1970) was a United States Army major general who served in both World War I and World War II. Over the course of his military career, he held key command and staff positions, contributing to the organization and leadership of U.S. forces during critical periods of the 20th century. He was director of the Army National Guard and commander of the District of Columbia National Guard. Abendroth's service earned him several military honors, and his leadership had a lasting impact on the units he commanded. Following his retirement, he remained involved in veterans’ affairs and military organizations.

== Early life ==
William Henry Abendroth Jr., nicknamed Harry, was the son of a career soldier who served in the American Indian Wars and the Spanish–American War before retiring as a First Sergeant and becoming an instructor in military studies at the University of Idaho. The younger Abendroth was born in Fort Meade, South Dakota, on December 24, 1895. He enlisted in the Idaho National Guard in 1913, and served as a member of Company H, 2nd Idaho Infantry Regiment on the Mexican border during the Pancho Villa Expedition.

Abendroth served with the army in France during World War I, first in an Infantry company, and later with an Engineer unit. He achieved the rank of first sergeant by the end of the war, and was discharged in 1919.

== Resumption of military service ==
In 1927, Abendroth rejoined the Idaho National Guard and was commissioned as a second lieutenant of Cavalry. He quickly advanced through command and staff positions of increasing rank and responsibility, including serving as military aide to the Governor of Idaho with the rank of captain. He commanded the 116th Cavalry Regiment as a colonel in the years immediately preceding the Second World War.

Abendroth also pursued a civilian career in state government, including appointments as a purchasing agent and claims examiner in the Purchasing Department, budget director for the State of Idaho, disbursing officer in the Highway Department, and rural electrification manager for Idaho Power.

In 1938, Abendroth was tried on embezzlement charges, accused of taking money while working as a purchasing agent for the state. He was charged with three counts, one each for $50, $250 and $50. He received a directed verdict of acquittal from the judge after the primary witness against Abendroth impeached himself under direct examination by the prosecutor.

== World War II ==
Abendroth was called to active duty for World War II. Assigned to the Headquarters of the IX Corps, he was posted as commandant of the Officer Candidate School, provost marshal for the corps area and commandant of the corps headquarters, serving in Hawaii, the Philippines, and Japan.

== Post-World War II ==
Upon returning to the United States Abendroth became a student at the United States Army Command and General Staff College, from which he graduated in 1946.

In April 1946 he was appointed adjutant general of the Idaho Military Department and federal director of Selective Service for Idaho, receiving promotion to brigadier general. He served until December, when a change in the governorship led to his resignation, enabling the new governor to appoint his own candidate.

As a colonel, Abendroth was then called to active duty, serving in the National Guard and Reserve Policy Office for the Chief of Staff of the United States Army from 1947 to 1949.

In 1949, Abendroth was appointed commander of the District of Columbia National Guard. He received promotion to major general and served until retiring in 1967, when he was succeeded by Charles L. Southward. From 1951 to 1955, Abendroth also served as Chief of the Army Division (now Director of the Army National Guard) at the National Guard Bureau.

== Retirement and death ==
In retirement, Abendroth resided in Falls Church, Virginia. He died at Walter Reed Hospital in Washington, D.C., on September 3, 1970. Abendroth is buried at Arlington National Cemetery, Section 5, Lot 21.

== Awards and decorations ==
Abendroth received the Army Distinguished Service Medal at his retirement. He was also a recipient of the Legion of Merit for his service in World War II.

== Legacy ==
The Abendroth Trophy is awarded each year to the best Army or Air Force unit of the District of Columbia National Guard during annual training.
