= People's Peace =

People's Peace may refer to:

- People's Peace Army, a fictional army in The Sword of Truth series
- People's Peace Treaty, a collaborative effort of Vietnamese and American students to end the Vietnam War
- Praja Shanti Party (lit. 'People Peace Party'), a political party in India
