= 1971 May Day protests against the Vietnam War =

Mass civil disobedience protests in Washington, D.C.

1971 May Day protests
- Part of the opposition to U.S. involvement in Vietnam
- Date: May 1971
- Location: Washington, D.C., U.S.

Parties
| Protesters: May Day tribe; Yippies; Other protesters | United States; U.S. Park Police; District of Columbia; D.C. Metropolitan Police; United States Army; 82nd Airborne Division; U.S. National Guard; U.S. Marine Corps |

Number
| 12,000 - 15,000 | 12,000 federal troops 5,100 local police 1,500 National Guardsmen |

Casualties
- Arrested: 12,000

The 1971 May Day protests against the Vietnam War were a series of large-scale civil disobedience actions in Washington, D.C., protesting the United States' continuing involvement in the Vietnam War. The protests began on Monday morning, May 3 and ended on May 5. In all, more than 12,000 people were arrested, in what was the largest mass arrest in U.S. history.

Members of the Nixon administration would come to view the events as damaging because the government's response was perceived as violating citizens' civil rights.

== Planning ==
By the middle of 1970, many anti-war movement leaders had come to believe that tactics of mass marches that had been used during the past six years would not end the war and that more aggressive actions were needed. Rennie Davis and David Dellinger of the People's Coalition for Peace and Justice and Jerry Coffin of the War Resisters League began planning the actions; later in 1970, Michael Lerner joined them. A group known as the May Day Tribe was formed: it was made up of Yippies and others among the more militant members of the anti-war movement. It was decided that small groups of protesters would block major intersections and bridges in the capital under the slogan, "If the government won't stop the war, we'll stop the government."

== The protests ==
=== Saturday May 1 ===
More than 40,000 protesters camped out in West Potomac Park near the Potomac River to listen to rock music and plan for the coming action.

=== Sunday May 2 ===
The Nixon administration secretly canceled the protesters' camping permit. U.S. Park Police and Washington Metropolitan Police, dressed in riot gear, raided the encampment. The police gave the campers until noon to clear out. Some protesters abandoned the demonstration and left the city. The remaining protesters, estimated at 12,000, regrouped at various churches and college campuses in the area.

=== Monday May 3 ===
The U.S. government had put into effect Operation Garden Plot, a plan it had developed during the 1960s to combat major civil disorder. Over the weekend, while protesters listened to music, planned their actions, or slept, 10,000 federal troops were moved to various locations in the Washington metropolitan area. At one point, so many soldiers and Marines were being moved into the area from bases along the East Coast that troop transports were landing at the rate of one every three minutes at Andrews Air Force Base in suburban Maryland, about 15 miles east of the White House. Among these troops were 4,000 paratroopers from the U.S. 82nd Airborne Division. Troops from the Marine Barracks lined both sides of the 14th St bridge. These troops were to back up the 5,100 officers of the D.C. Metropolitan Police, 2,000 members of the D.C. National Guard, and federal agents that were already in place. Every monument, park, and traffic circle in the nation's capital had troops protecting its perimeters. Paratroopers and Marines deployed via helicopter to the grounds of the Washington Monument.

Protesters announced that because the government had not stopped the Vietnam War, they "would stop the Government". and told troops, many of whom were of similar age, that their goal was to prevent the troops from being sent to Vietnam. While the troops were in place and thousands held in reserve, the police clashed with members of the May Day tribe. The protesters engaged in hit-and-run tactics throughout the city, trying to disrupt traffic and cause chaos in the streets. President Richard Nixon, who was at the Western White House in San Clemente, California, refused to give Federal workers the day off, forcing them to navigate through police lines and May Day tribe roadblocks. The presidential response was managed by White House Counsel John Dean, who was present at the White House. Most commuters who tried arrived at their jobs, despite being delayed somewhat. Federal Employees for Peace held a rally the following day in Lafayette Park. During the riots, the military accidentally shot a tear gas canister into the President's Dining Room during a lunch between the President's daughter Julie Nixon and her mother-in-law, former First Lady Mamie Eisenhower.

While the troops secured the major intersections and bridges, the police abandoned their usual arrest procedures, roaming through the city making sweep arrests and using tear gas. They detained anyone who looked like a demonstrator. By 8 a.m. thousands of people had been arrested, including many who had not been breaking any law. The city's prisons did not have the capacity to handle that many people; thus several emergency detention centers were set up, including the Washington Coliseum and another one surrounded by an 8-foot-high (2.4 m) fence was set up next to RFK Stadium. The prisoners massed against the fence, pushed it over, and were tear-gassed. No food, water, or sanitary facilities were made available by authorities, but sympathetic local residents brought supplies. Skirmishes between protesters and police occurred up until about midday. In Georgetown, the police herded the protesters and onlookers through the streets to the Georgetown University campus. The police then engaged in a back-and-forth with the protesters outside the university's main gate on O Street, lobbing tear gas over the gate each time they pushed the crowd back. Other forms of gas were used, including pepper based and one that induced vomiting. Police helicopters also dropped tear gas on the university's lower athletic field, where protesters had camped the night before. Numerous people were injured and treated by volunteers on campus. By afternoon the police had suppressed the protest and held more than 7,000 prisoners.

=== Next several days ===
On Tuesday, May 4, another 2,000 people were arrested at a sit-in outside the Robert F. Kennedy Department of Justice Building, where the United States Army had deployed machine gun nests. The demonstrators were surrounded by police and troops with fixed bayonets and were told to exit the area. The few who attempted to leave were prevented from doing so by the police. On Wednesday, May 5, 1,200 more people were arrested at a legal rally on the steps of the U.S. Capitol, bringing the total to 12,614 people, making this the largest mass arrest in U.S. history.

== Aftermath ==
The United States Department of Justice filed conspiracy charges against May Day leader Rennie Davis, as well as against two other activists who had been members of the Chicago 7, John Froines and Abbie Hoffman. The charges were eventually dismissed. Out of the 12,000 demonstrators arrested, most were released without charges. Only 79 were ultimately convicted. The American Civil Liberties Union pursued a class action suit on behalf of thousands of detained protesters and ultimately the federal courts, recognizing the illegal nature of the arrests, ordered the government to pay a settlement to those arrested, making them some of the only citizens in US history to receive financial compensation for violation of the constitutional rights of free assembly and due process.

Richard Helms, who was Central Intelligence Agency director at the time, said, "It was obviously viewed by everybody in the administration, particularly with all the arrests and the howling about civil rights and human rights and all the rest of it...as a very damaging kind of event. I don't think there was any doubt about that."

== See also ==
- List of protest marches on Washington, D.C.
- List of incidents of civil unrest in the United States
