= District of Columbia National Guard =

Component of the US National Guard

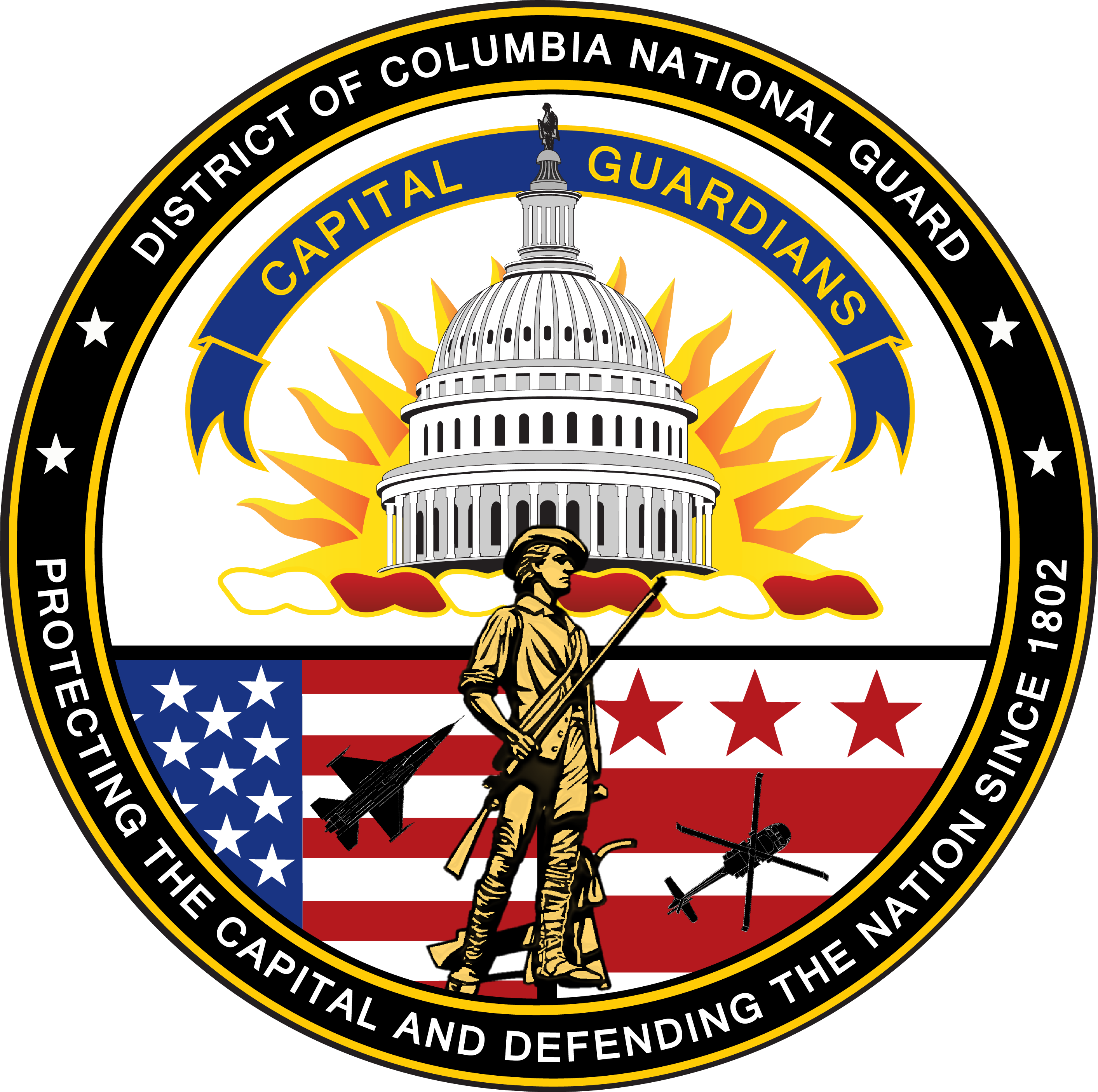
- Seal
- Active: As militia: 1776–1903; As reserve: 1903–present
- Country: United States
- Allegiance: District of Columbia
- Branch: United States Army; United States Air Force
- Type: Militia
- Role: United States Army National Guard; United States Air National Guard
- Size: 3,400
- Part of: National Guard; National Guard Bureau
- Engagements: War of 1812: Chesapeake campaign; Battle of Bladensburg; Seminole Wars; American Civil War: First Battle of Bull Run; Jackson's Valley campaign; Battle of Fort Stevens; Spanish–American War; Mexican Border War; World War I (Note: 1st Battalion only); World War II; Korean War; Berlin Crisis of 1961 (Note: 113th Wing); Vietnam War (Note: Air units only); War in Afghanistan; Iraq War; January 6 United States Capitol attack

Commanders
- Commander-in-Chief: President of the United States
- Secretary of Defense: Pete Hegseth
- Commanding General: BG Leland D. Blanchard II, USA (interim)
- Command Chief Warrant Officer: CW5 Bernard L. Aguon, USA
- Command Senior Enlisted Leader: CSM Ronald L. Smith Jr., USA

Insignia
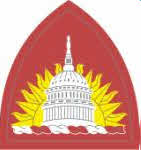
- District of Columbia ARNG Headquarters SSI

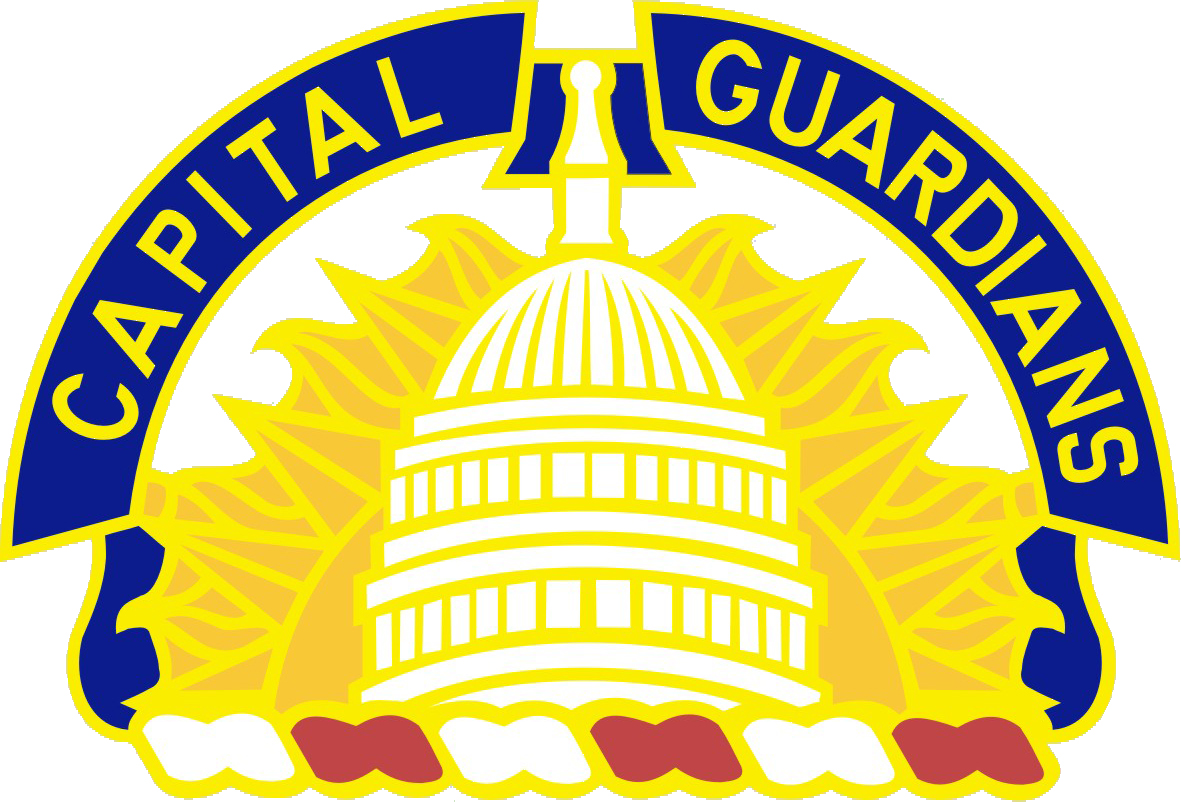
- District of Columbia ARNG Headquarters DUI

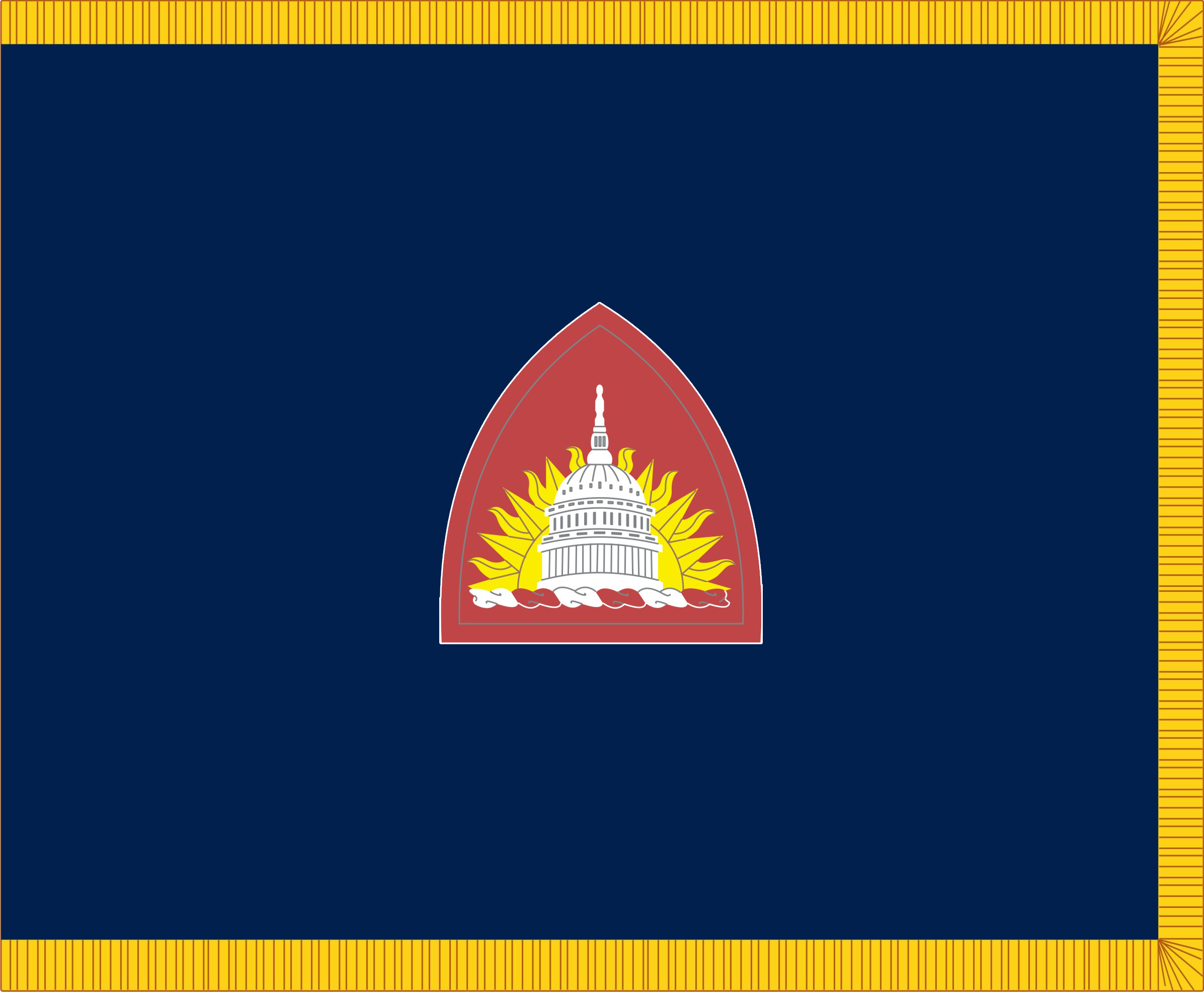
- District of Columbia ARNG Headquarters Flag

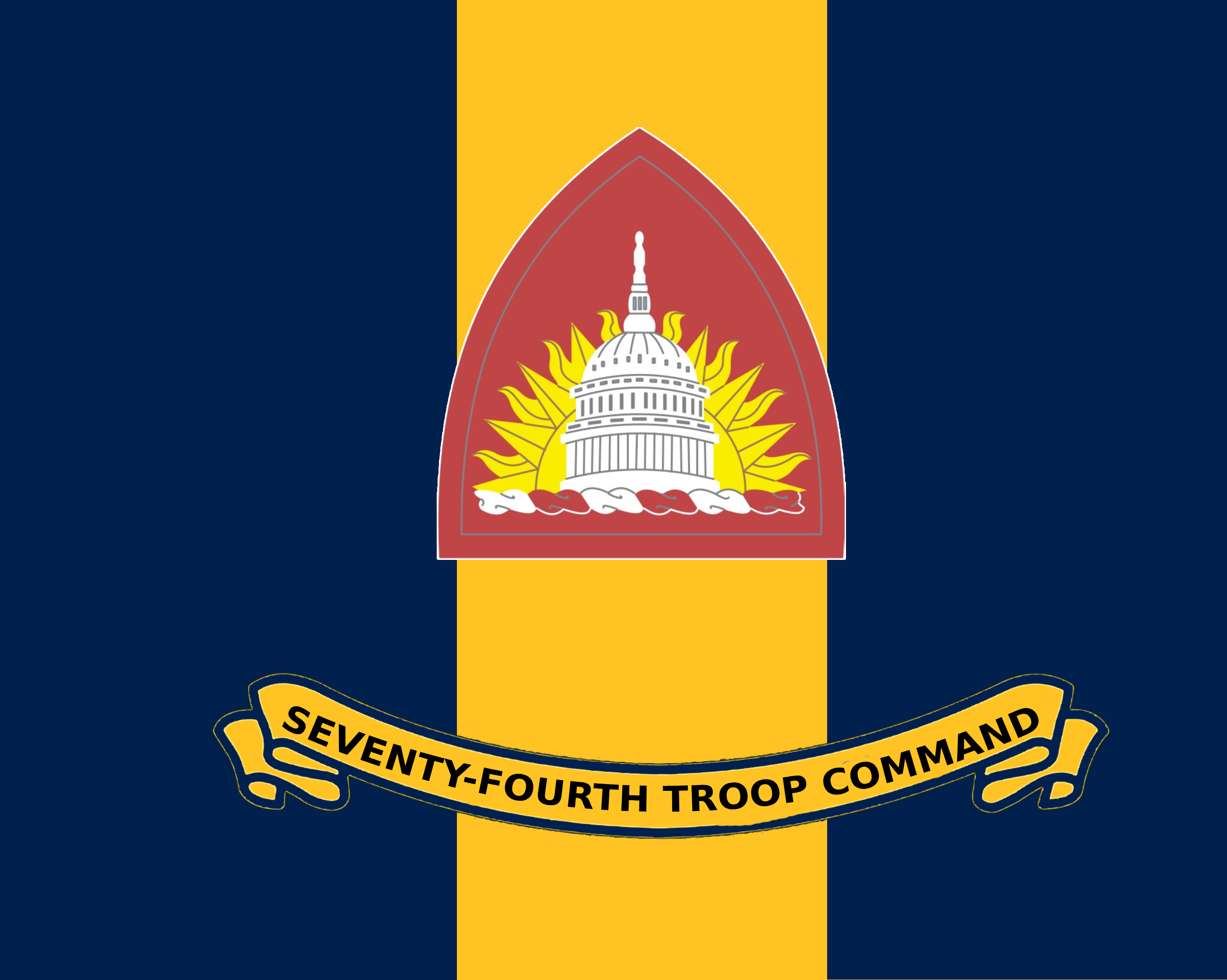
- Flag of the 74th Troop Command DC ARNG

The District of Columbia National Guard is the branch of the National Guard of the United States based in the District of Columbia. It comprises both the D.C. Army National Guard and the D.C. Air National Guard components.

The president of the United States is the commander-in-chief of the District of Columbia National Guard. Command is exercised through the secretary of defense and the commanding general, Joint Force Headquarters (JFHQ), District of Columbia National Guard. In 1949, President Truman issued Executive Order No. 10030, of January 26, 1949, providing authority for the Secretary of Defense to delegate his command authority over the D.C. National Guard to: the secretary of the Army for the D.C. Army National Guard, and the secretary of the Air Force for the D.C. Air National Guard. However, in 1969, President Nixon issued Executive Order 11485, revoking the previous authorities of EO 10030. The secretary of defense then delegated command authority to the Secretary of the Army, operating through the singular commanding general of the D.C. National Guard. In 2021, the secretary of defense amended the previous delegation of authority to the secretary of the Army, to explicitly specify a single point of contact, the DoD executive secretary, for all requests from or for assistance by the D.C. National Guard. Further, the secretary of defense retained sole authority over such requests when actions within 48 hours are required, or if the anticipated request will include support of civilian law enforcement, such as “crowd control, traffic control, search, seizure, arrest, or temporary detention.”

The D.C. National Guard is commanded by a major general with a brigadier general as the adjutant general. The mayor of the District of Columbia, the United States Marshal for the District of Columbia, or the National Capital Service director may request the commander-in-chief to aid them in suppressing insurrection and enforcement of the law; however, there is no chain of authority from the Mayor of the District of Columbia (or any other executive or legislative body organic to the District of Columbia) to the D.C. National Guard.

== Units ==
- District of Columbia Army National Guard
  - Multi-Agency Augmentation Command, commanded by an O7
  - 74th Troop Command (United States), commanded by an O6
    - 372nd Military Police Battalion ("Red Hand")
    - 547th Transportation Company
    - 104th Maintenance Company
    - 1946th Finance Company
  - 260th Regiment (Regional Training Institute)
  - 257th Army Band "The Band of the Nation's Capital"
  - 1-224th Aviation Security and Support Battalion
    - D Company (Air Ambulance)
    - Detachment 1, A Company
  - 1-126th General Support Aviation Battalion
    - Detachment 1, C Company (Air Ambulance)
  - District of Columbia Medical Command
  - Detachment 4, Operational Support Airlift Command
  - Recruiting and Retention Battalion
  - National Guard Bureau Legal Support Office
- District of Columbia Air National Guard
  - 113th Wing
    - 113th Operations Group
      - 121st Fighter Squadron
      - 201st Airlift Squadron
    - 113th Maintenance Group
    - 113th Support Group
    - 113th Medical Group
    - 121st Weather Group
    - 231st Combat Communications Squadron
  - The Naval militia of the District of Columbia remains an authorized force by Federal statute, but has been inactive for several decades with no current membership.

== History ==
=== Creating the District of Columbia ===
The Residence Act of 1790 established that the country would create a new capital city rather than selecting an existing city. In 1801, The Organic Act designed District of Columbia as the capital of the United States and put its governance under the control of Congress. Which militia would protect a city without a governor under the control of Congress?

=== Establishing the District of Columbia National Guard ===
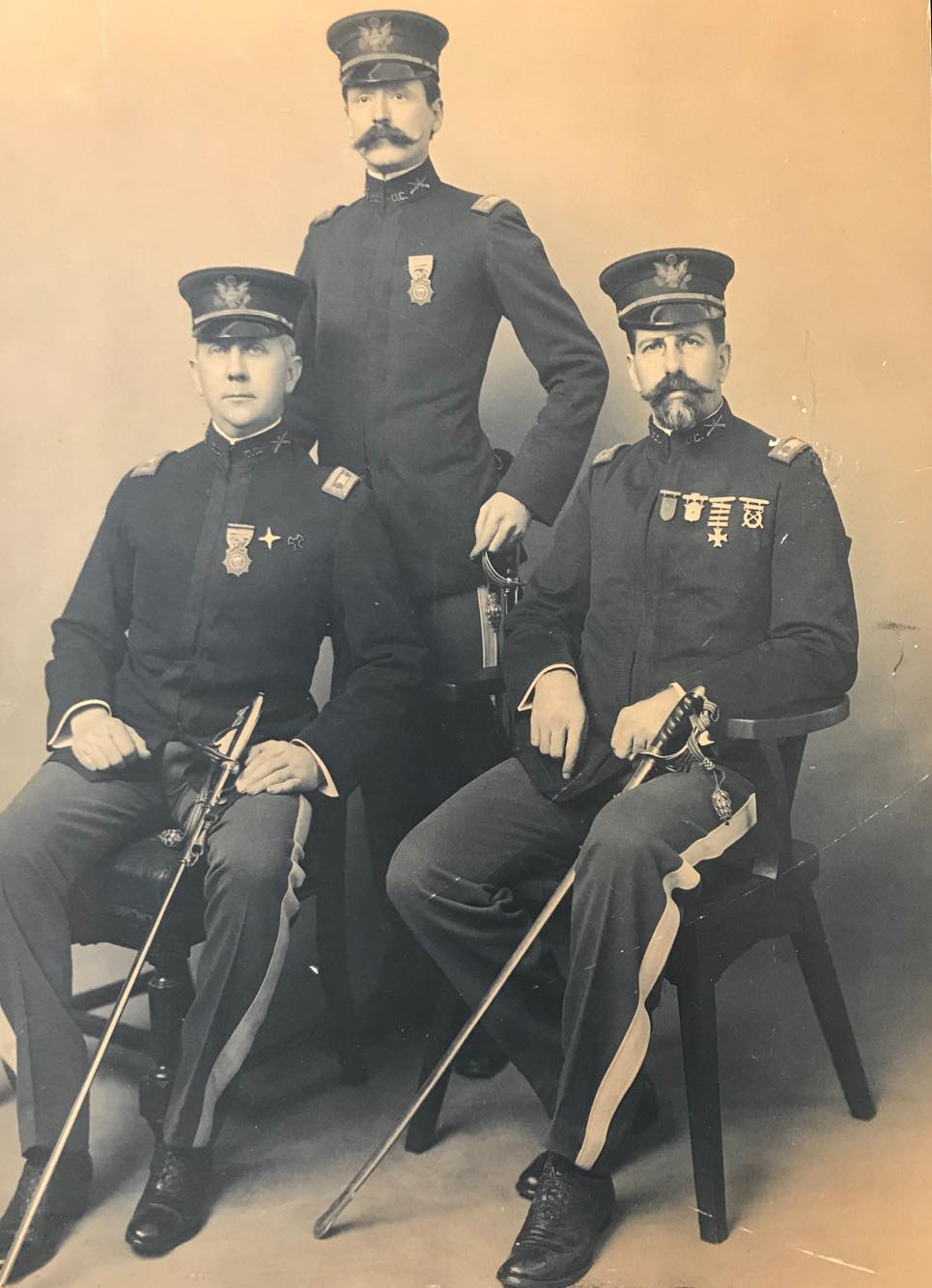
(From left to right): District of Columbia Militia commanding generals, Brig. Gen. Richard Simms (January 18, 1918 – March 31, 1920), Maj. Gen. Anton Stephan (April 28, 1920 – April 10, 1934) and Brig. Gen. William Harvey (June 4, 1913 – August 17, 1917)

The D.C. National Guard came about in part due to the efforts of President Thomas Jefferson, the first president to spend his term in District of Columbia. He came into office during a time when strife between two major political parties were threatening to divide a newly developed country. The commanding generals of the two closest militia units were members of President Jefferson's rival political party. At this point, there was only a very small regular army, and they were mostly patrolling the border. If a state's militia tried to force political will, there would be no way to keep them from marching on the Capitol and coercing, or overthrowing the government.

President Jefferson saw the vulnerability of United States' political system would be put in jeopardy if the will of a military leader could significantly influence the legislative body from enacting the political will as determined by elections envisaged by the Constitution. To prevent this, the Militia of the District of Columbia was established in the Assumption Act of May 3, 1802.

Due to the fact that the District of Columbia is not a state, the D.C. National Guard is the only local National Guard with a national mission to protect the Federal Government – a mission reflected in its motto "Capital Guardians."

On October 30, 1802, the D.C. Militia held its first muster. President Jefferson hand-selected his new officers and was known to enjoy attending drills. A year later, the Congress officially recognized the organization.

=== The Bladensburg races ===
The fledgling D.C. Militia was tested during the War of 1812 and the Battle of Bladensburg. Maryland and Virginia, preoccupied with attacks on their own territory, were sluggish to send troops to D.C. The D.C. Militia, even when augmented by regular forces, was overwhelmed and ordered to withdraw and to concede the city to the British forces. After the battle, Congress too noticed and increased the size and equipment of the D.C. Militia.

Other than the Headquarters itself, which traces its lineage to 1776 as an elements of the Maryland Militia in Georgetown and Bladensburg, the oldest continuous unit of the D.C. National Guard is Headquarters and Headquarters Company (HHC), 372nd Military Police Battalion, which traces its lineage to the Washington Light Infantry organized in 1836 by John A. Blake.

=== Francis Scott Key and the national anthem ===
The war of 1812 would produce an American treasure and one of the most famous veterans of the D.C. National Guard, Francis Scott Key. Key was a lieutenant with the Georgetown Field Artillery of the D.C. Militia. During the British bombardment in Baltimore harbor, he was sent to Maryland to negotiate with the British for a prisoner exchange. After negotiations, the ship's commander felt Key had seen too much and needed to stay on the ship through the rest of the attack on Baltimore's Fort McHenry. The following morning, Key observed the flag still flying above the Fort and was inspired to write the poem that became the lyrics to the Star-Spangled Banner— the national anthem of the United States.

=== Inaugural heritage ===
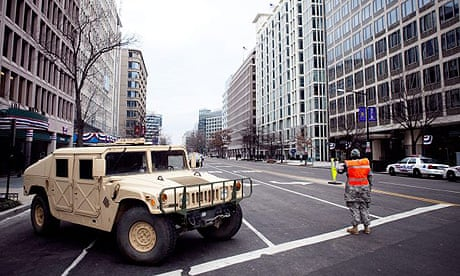
DCNG service member performed security duty during Obama inauguration, January 2009. (photo by Brendan Hoffman/Getty images.)

The D.C. National Guard has played a pivotal role in presidential Inaugurations, a tradition starting in the earliest days of the nation. The D.C. Militia or National Guard has been at every presidential Inauguration beginning with an honor detail which rode with President Washington in recognition of his time as Virginia's militia commander.

The D.C. Guard's participation in inaugurations may be that old, but certainly takes form in 1860. The election of Abraham Lincoln triggered several southern states to eventually secede from the Union. At Lincoln's first inaugural, Lieutenant General Winfield Scott, General-in-Chief of the Army, ordered the D.C. Militia to protect the president-elect from harm. The D.C. Militia guarded the parade routes, sappers preceded the president-elect, and D.C. Cavalry rode alongside of him, bucking their horses to make it difficult for snipers to take a shot. Upon arriving at the White House the new president received his first military salute from volunteer members of the D.C. Militia and an unbroken tradition of inaugural service was born.

When necessary, members of the D.C. National Guard may be deputized as special police, a role the active Army and Air Force cannot perform. That makes the National Guard an important element in large-scale events such as an inauguration. In 2009, the D.C. National Guard led a group of over ten thousand National Guard soldiers and airmen in support of the largest inauguration in history.

=== American Civil War ===
As war approached, the D.C. Militia was commanded by Major General Roger C. Weightman, one of six District of Columbia mayors to serve as D.C. Militia colonels or generals. His subordinates included Major General Force; brigadier generals Bacon and Carrington; and Brigadier General Robert Ould, who would move to Virginia and later join the Confederate States Army.

Maryland and Virginia were both slave states at the beginning of the war, surrounding the District of Columbia with potential enemy territory. Three days before the shots at Fort Sumter, President Lincoln called in the D.C. Militia to protect the capital, making it famous for providing "the first man…first company…first regiment" mobilized for the American Civil War.

The D.C. Militia saw an unfortunate first when Private Manual C. Causten became the first Union prisoner of war captured by the Confederacy during the Civil War.

D.C. Militia soldiers served on active duty for up to four years, engaging in combat during the Battle of Manassas and the Valley Campaign. They also maintained their historical role as protectors of the Capital, manning the forts which encircled Washington, D.C. At Fort Stevens, in District of Columbia soldiers included African-American quartermaster clerks who were originally not allowed to join combat regiments. As D.C. faced attack from the Confederate States Army, they were issued weapons and told to defend their city. President Abraham Lincoln traveled to Fort Stevens to view the fighting. It is said that he was brusquely ordered from harm's way by an officer, possibly Horatio Wright, although other probably apocryphal stories claim that it was Oliver Wendell Holmes Jr., later Acting Chief Justice of the U.S. Supreme Court. It would be the only time in history that a serving president would face enemy fire.

=== Black militia: 1867–1898 ===
The Butler Zouaves, named after Gen. Benjamin F. Butler, and the Stanton Guard, named after Secretary of War Edwin Stanton, were the first post-Civil War African-American units to organize. The Butler Zouaves survived the decline of the militia in the late 1870s and, in 1887, entered the then new National Guard of the District of Columbia as its Fifth Battalion. The first unit destined to become a permanent part of the D.C. Guard, however, was the Washington Cadet Corps, established June 12, 1880, as a single company ("Company A"), and expanded in October 1884 as a three-company battalion, reaching its full four-company strength in 1885.

=== Protecting the nation's borders ===
From its earliest days, the D.C. National Guard has remained ready to accept the call to protect the United States, participating in the Creek War, Seminole Wars and Spanish–American War. In 1898, the D.C's 1st Volunteer Infantry fought alongside the United States Volunteers during the War, where they earned credit for the Santiago Campaign. The 1st DC Volunteer Infantry was commanded by George Herbert Harries, who left his position as commander of the DC National Guard and accepted reduction in rank to colonel so he could lead the regiment in Cuba. After the war Harries returned to command of the district National Guard as a brigadier general, and he attained promotion to major general before retiring in 1915.

The D.C National Guard served with border patrols on the Southwest border in 1916 during the Pancho Villa raids, a mission similar to the one they would return to in the 21st century in support of the U.S. Customs and Border Protection.

=== World War I ===
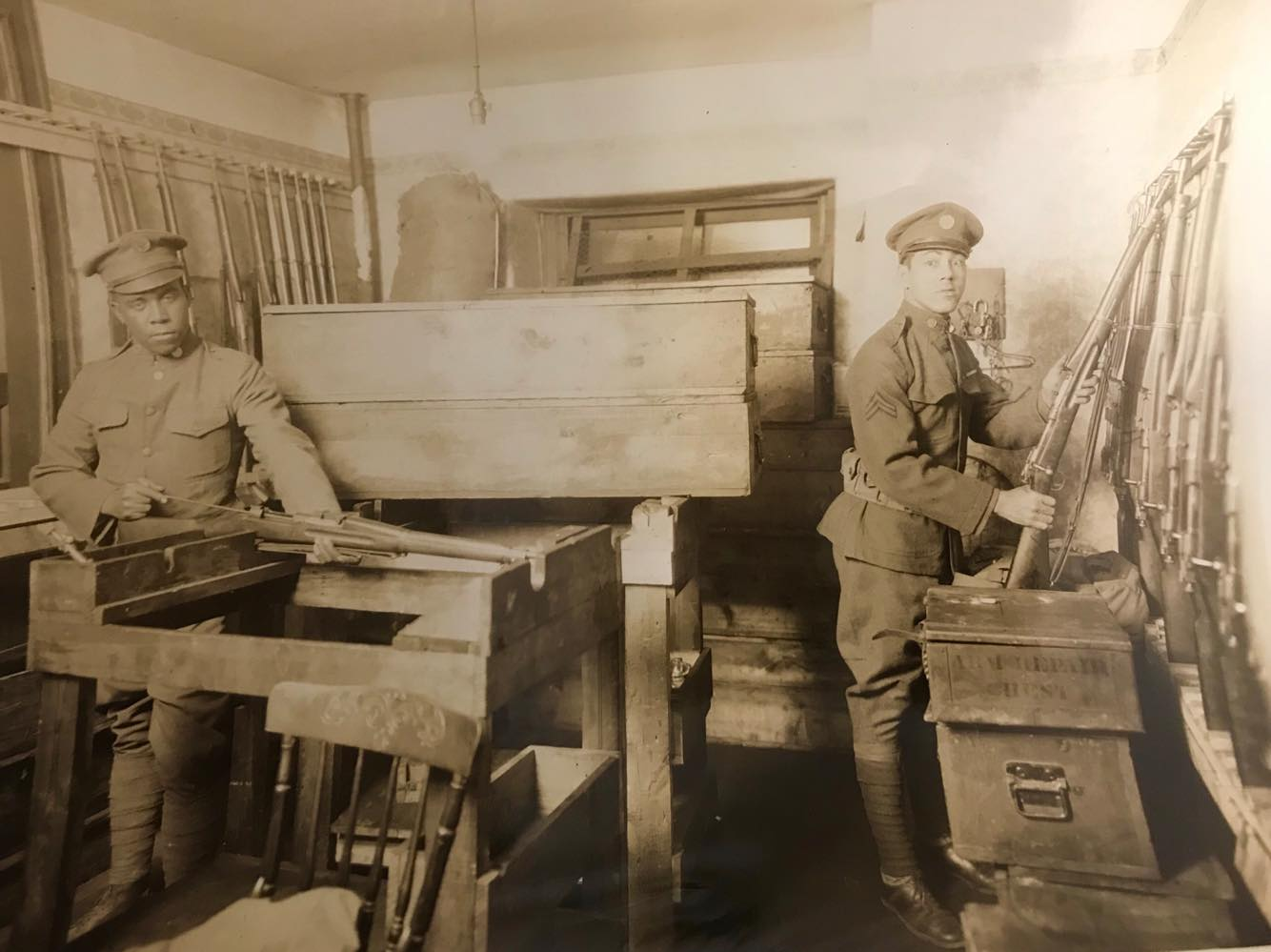
Enlisted men of the 1st Separate Battalion, an all African-American unit, examining weapons in the old army arms room prior to World War I

In 1917, fearing espionage, D.C. National Guard elements were mobilized 12 days before the U.S. officially entered World War I to protect reservoirs and power plants around District of Columbia Military officials were concerned that too many of the D.C. units were made up of men with foreign roots, thus the job of protecting vital facilities fell to the all-black 1st Separate Infantry, the only unit the military believed could be trusted with this mission.

Eventually the 1st Separate was mustered into active service and re-designated the 1st Battalion of the 372nd Infantry. In France, unsure of what to do with an African-American regiment, the 372nd was attached to the French Army's 157th "Red Hand" Division. The soldiers fought in Meuse-Argonne, Lorraine and Alsace, where they were awarded the Croix de Guerre—one of the highest honors bestowed by the French military. Général Goybet, the 157th commanding general, gave the unit a Red Hand insignia in honor of their service. The red hand appears today on the crest of the 372nd Military Police Battalion. Although many D.C. National Guard units were mobilized, the 372nd was the only one to actually see combat during the war.

=== World War II ===
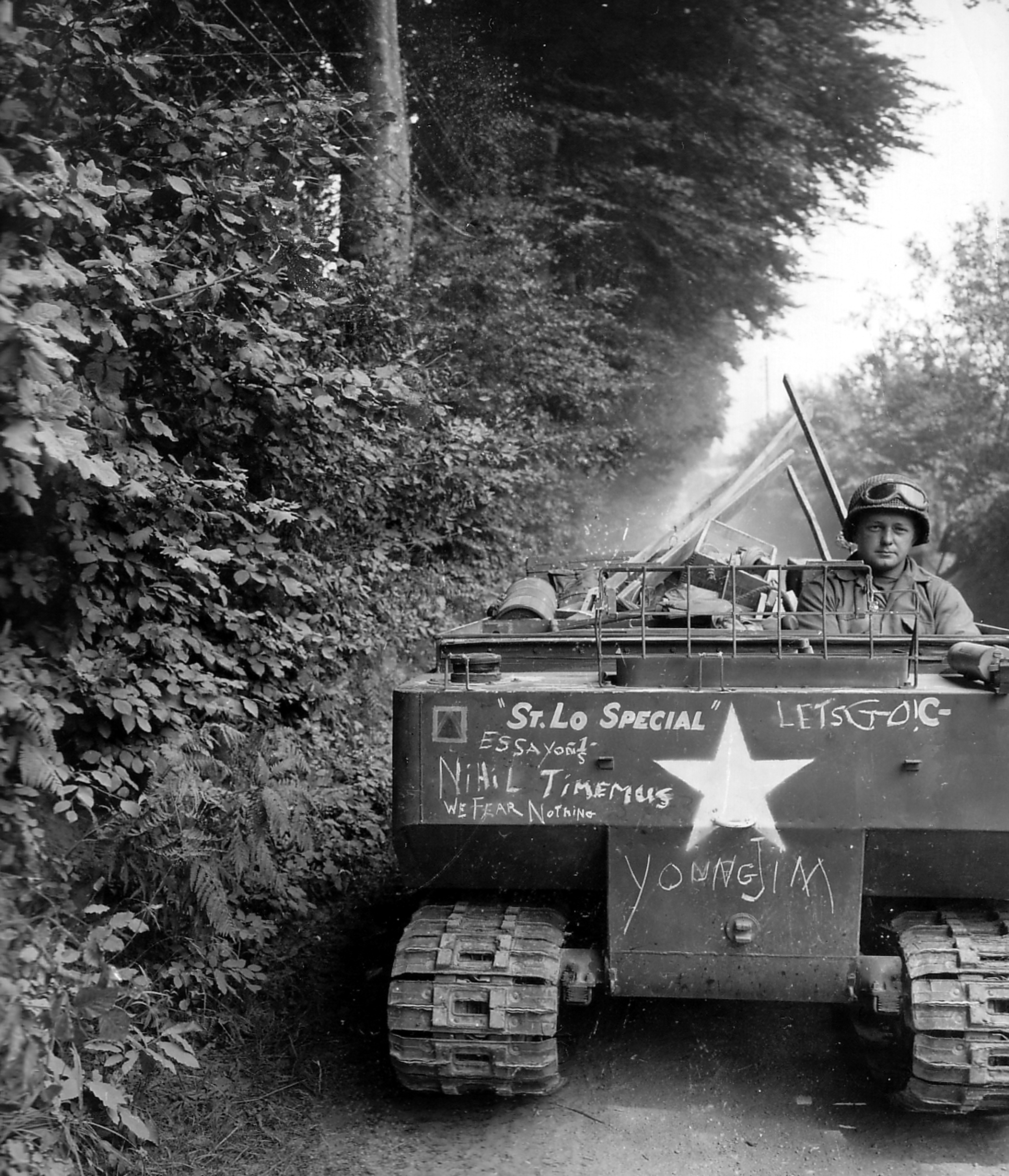
A service member from the 121st Engineer Combat Battalion, driving a M29 Weasel, in France, 1944. (photo by Conseil Régional de Basse-Normandie / National Archives USA)

When the U.S. entered World War II, the D.C. National Guard was immediately mobilized. Ground units served in both the Pacific and European theaters and air units saw service along the Atlantic coast in anti-submarine defense. The D.C. National Guard's 121st Engineer Combat Battalion was among the units in the first wave on Omaha beach in Normandy on D-Day. This is portrayed in the 1962 film, The Longest Day.

In 1940, the 121st Observation Squadron was organized and began operations at Bolling Field (today Bolling Air Force Base) in District of Columbia It ended the war as the 121st Fighter Squadron. At the end of the war the U.S. Army Air Corps (later the U.S. Air Force) decided to preserve the history of its most famous fighter unit, the 352nd Fighter Group (know affectionately as the Bluenosed Bastards of Bodney), and allocated it to the D.C Air National Guard's 113th Wing. Since the 113th Wing includes the 121st, it carries the campaign credit from the Antisubmarine Campaign, the Po Valley Campaign, the North Apennines Campaign and the Rome-Arno Campaign.

=== The Cold War era ===
At the end of World War II, the D.C. National Guard faced the enormous task of restructuring and retraining. The Cold War years marked a new relationship between the National Guard and active military. In 1947, the U.S. Air Force was designated a separate branch of the military; the D.C. Air National Guard became a reality in 1950, when the 113th Wing received federal recognition.

In 1951, the D.C. Army National Guard's 715th Truck Company became one of the few National Guard units mobilized for the Korean War to actually go to Korea. They called their orderly room in Korea the Blair House after the president's Guest House.

In 1961, the 113th Wing was activated for a year in support of the Berlin Crisis. In 1968, they were again activated by President Lyndon B. Johnson in response to the Pueblo Crisis. The bulk of the unit was assigned to Myrtle Beach, South Carolina. Later, many of these airmen deployed as individuals to Vietnam in support of the Vietnam War.

==== The March on Washington ====
The District of Columbia National Guard played a crucial role in one of the largest gatherings for civil rights in U.S. history. On August 28, 1963, approximately 250,000 people were present at the March on Washington in the nation's capital. D.C. guardsmen were positioned at national monuments around the city to help maintain the crowds during the March on Washington. During the event, Martin Luther King Jr. delivered his iconic “I Have a Dream” speech. D.C. guardsmen were able to maintain a peaceful demonstration and no incidents were reported by law enforcement. President John F. Kennedy submitted a compelling federal civil right bill to Congress following the historic march.

==== Vietnam War ====
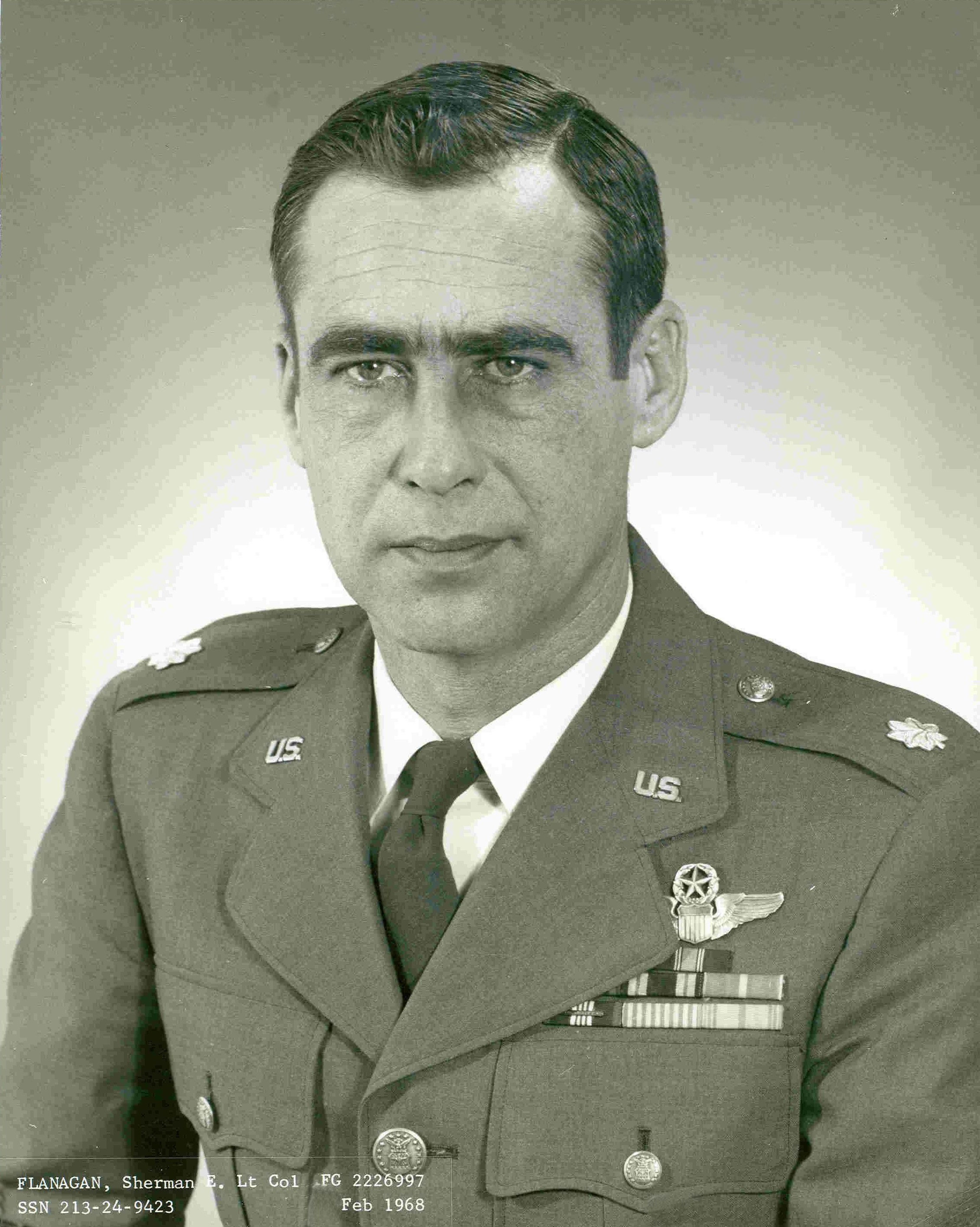
Lt Col Sherman E. Flanagan Jr., 1968, member of the 121st Tactical Fighter Squadron, D.C. Air National Guard

During the Vietnam War in the 1960s, most National Guard units were purposefully left out of the war over concern that a National Guard call-up would increase the unpopularity of the war. As part of the individual or "levied" replacement program, Air National Guard pilots were allowed to volunteer for deployment to Vietnam.

The 113th Wing established a Replacement Training Unit to send F-100C Super Sabre pilots to the conflict. On July 21, 1968, in South Vietnam, Lieutenant Colonel Sherman Flanagan, a D.C. Air Guardsman, crashed his F1-100 Super Sabre, while on his way to a mission and was killed. His body was never found. A researcher reported in 1973, that Flanagan may have been one of the first National Guardsman killed from Maryland, during this time period.

=== 9/11 response ===
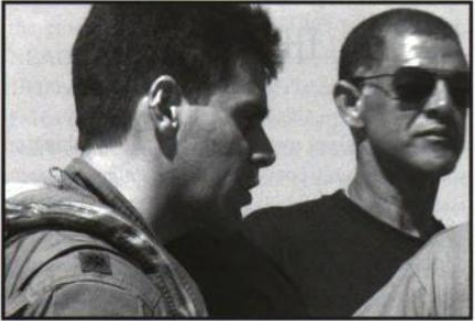
Lt. Col. Marc Sasseville on morning of September 11, 2001 at Joint Base Andrews, MD., moments before boarding his aircraft. (Photo by: 1st Air Force

On the morning of September 11, 2001, a duty officer from the 113th Wing, D.C. Air National Guard received a call from the U.S. Secret Service with instructions from the White House to scramble F-16s. The Pentagon had just been hit, and the White House knew another airliner, United Flight 93, had been hijacked. After a call with the White House operations center, the 113th Wing commander issued a scramble order to set up a combat air patrol over D.C. and to deter all aircraft within 20 miles with "whatever force is necessary… to keep from hitting a building downtown." As the F-16 crew returned due to fuel, the next crew went out. There was no time to arm them with missiles, so each fighter went out carrying only 500 training bullets—just enough for a five-second burst. At the time, they believed that there may have been more hostile aircraft. D.C. Air National Guard pilots were prepared to stop any hostile aircraft they encountered by any means necessary, up to and including ramming hijacked airliners. By this point, fighters from Langley Air Force Base and the fighters from the D.C. National Guard were put in contact with each other. Flight 93 was no longer a threat, but the two units worked together to escort aircraft out of the airspace.

Meanwhile, with more information that several people at the Pentagon were dead and several more injured, the D.C. Army National Guard helicopter pilots were launched from Davidson Army Air Field to the site of the attack on the Pentagon. They began ferrying casualties to Walter Reed National Military Medical Center and medical personnel back to the Pentagon.

In the days after September 11, 600 soldiers from the D.C. Army National Guard were mobilized around the city, including the Capitol building. The Mobilization Augmentation Command reported to duty immediately, becoming the first National Guard unit mobilized for the global war on terror. Continuous combat air patrols were maintained over Washington, D.C., and New York City until the spring of 2002.

=== Global War on Terrorism ===
The D.C. National Guard has deployed more than 1,200 soldiers and airmen to support the global war on terrorism. The D.C. Guard completed over 90 whole-unit deployments, including tours in Iraq, Afghanistan, Guantanamo Bay, Saudi Arabia and stateside missions as part of Operation Noble Eagle. Many D.C. National Guard soldiers and airmen served multiple deployments. Since September 11, 2001, the 113th Wing has provided 24-hour protective coverage over the skies of the United States's Capitals, as the "D.C. National Guard Capital Guardians."

The D.C National Guard served with border patrols on the Southwest border in 1916 during the Pancho Villa raids, a mission similar to the one they would return to in the 21st century in support of the U.S. Customs and Border Protection.

=== COVID-19 pandemic ===
==== George Floyd riots ====
During the May/June 2020 protests that took place in Washington, D.C., concerning the murder of George Floyd while in Minnesota Police custody, the DCNG served as the hub for 3,000 National Guard members. The DCNG managed over 3,000 soldiers and airmen from different states, including the 1,200 from the DCNG, in an effort to support the District of Columbia Metropolitan Police Department (MPD), other civil authorities and first responders.

After activation of National Guard units across the U.S. around the end of May 2020, Guardsmen from the Mississippi and the Indiana Army National Guard's, arrive at the DCNG on June 1, along with several other National Guard units.

==== 2021 storming of the Capitol ====
D.C. National Guard was activated among other units during the 6 January 2021 riot to assist federal law enforcement agencies after rioters supporting Donald Trump breached the Capitol Building during the joint session to certify the results of the 2020 United States presidential election.

== Unique law ==
Normally, U.S. federal law specifically charges the U.S. National Guard with dual federal and state missions. As a federal district, the District of Columbia has a mayor but no governor, and federal law makes the president the commander-in-chief.

Supervision and control of D.C. National Guard was delegated by the president to the defense secretary pursuant to Executive Order 10030, 26 January 1949 with authority to designate National Military Establishment officials to administer affairs of the D.C. National Guard. The Army secretary was directed to act in all matters pertaining to the ground component, and the Air Force secretary was directed to act in all matters pertaining to the air component.

The D.C. National Guard is the only U.S. military force empowered to carry out federal functions in a state or, in this case, a district. Those functions range from limited actions during non-emergency situations to full scale law enforcement of martial law when local law enforcement officials can no longer maintain civil control. The National Guard may be called into federal service in response to a call by the president.

== List of commanding generals ==
The District of Columbia commanding general is the senior military officer and commander of the District of Columbia National Guard.

However, the Congressional Act of 1871 placed a governor at the head of the District of Columbia and the District of Columbia Militia, and from 1871 to 1887, there was no commanding general. in 1887, the position of governor was eliminated and a commissioner form of government was established with five appointed commissioners, and the position of commanding general returned.

As of today, there have been 24 commanding generals of the District of Columbia National Guard.

Rank	Name	Appointment	Date of Relief
Brig. Gen.	John Mason	Jun. 28, 1802	1811
Maj. Gen.	John Peter Van Ness	1811	1814
	Vacant	1814	1827
Maj. Gen.	Walter Smith	1827	1829
Maj. Gen.	Walter Jones	1829	1847
Brig. Gen.	Roger C. Weightman	1847	1849
Maj. Gen.	Walter Jones	1849	1859
Brig. Gen.	Roger C. Weightman	1860	1871
Brig. Gen.	Albert Ordway	1887	1897
Maj. Gen.	George Herbert Harries	1897	1913
Brig. Gen.	William E. Harvey	Jun. 4, 1913	Aug. 17, 1917
Brig. Gen.	Richard D. Simms	Jan. 18, 1918	Mar. 31, 1920
Brig. Gen.	Anton Stephan	April 28, 1920	April 10, 1934
Col.	John W. Oehman (Acting)	1934	1938
Brig. Gen.	Albert Lyman Cox	1938	1949
Maj. Gen.	William H. Abendroth	1949	1967
Maj. Gen.	Charles L. Southward	1967	1974
Maj. Gen.	Cunningham C. Bryant	Aug. 4, 1974	Dec. 5, 1981
Maj. Gen.	Calvin G. Franklin	Dec. 8, 1981	Sept. 30, 1991
Maj. Gen.	Russell C. Davis	Dec. 1991	Dec. 1995
Maj. Gen.	Warren L. Freeman	Dec. 18, 1995	Dec. 31, 2002
Maj. Gen.	David F. Wherley Jr.	June 27, 2003	June 20, 2008
Maj. Gen.	Errol R. Schwartz	Jun. 27, 2008	Jan. 20, 2017
Maj. Gen.	William J. Walker	Jan. 20, 2017	Apr. 25, 2021
Maj. Gen.	Sherrie L. McCandless	Apr. 25, 2021	Oct. 1, 2023
Maj. Gen.	John C. Andonie	Oct. 1, 2023	Present

== Joint Task Force-District of Columbia ==
Joint Task Force-District of Columbia, is an element of the District of Columbia National Guard. It usually is constituted as part of a larger local or Federal effort to prepare for or react to an emerging situation, including National Special Security Events.

It is tasked to support presidential inaugurations, State of the Union (SOTA) addresses, summits like the Nuclear Security Summit, protests, weather-related storms, the annual Washington, D.C., Fourth of July event, among others.

JTF-DC participates in all inter-agency planning and conducts planning with joint partners in the National Capital Region (NCR). Additionally, JTF-DC provides support, including traffic control, crowd management and security, for presidential inaugurations and related official ceremonies and events throughout the inaugural period, continuing the tradition of military participation in the presidential inauguration of the commander-in-chief dating back to the inauguration of George Washington in 1789.

== State Partnership Program ==
The State Partnership Program (SPP) is a joint program of the United States Department of Defense (DoD) and the individual states, territories, and District of Columbia. Guard members work with partner militaries to strengthen shared defenses through building partner capacity activities. Typically, Guard Airmen and Soldiers spend the majority of their careers in the same wing or unit, enabling them to develop long-term relationships, trust, and continuity with their SPP partners. This small-footprint program delivers a significant return on investment by broadening the pool of foreign security partners who are willing and able to help maintain global security. Most of the earliest SPP partner countries in Europe have gone on to become U.S. allies in NATO, and many of them credit the SPP and their National Guard state partners with helping make that possible.

Seal of the Jamaica Defence Force	Jamaica (Jamaica Defence Force) joined the SPP with the District of Columbia National Guard in 1999, with the first exchange-taking place in October 1999. The overarching purpose of the partnership is to enhance U.S. Southern Command's ability to establish and maintain enduring military-to-military, military-to-security force and military-to-emergency response/disaster response agencies that improve long-term security cooperation relationships, while expanding partnership capacity. The partnership between the District of Columbia National Guard and Jamaica entered its 20th year in 2019 and averages nearly 20 cooperative events each year. Major Baron K. Mason is the current District of Columbia Army National Guard Bilateral Affairs Officer for Jamaica.
Burkina Faso Coat of Arms	On February 1, 2019, Burkina Faso (Burkina Faso Armed Forces) became the 76th nation to join the State Partnership Program. At a ceremony held at the Ministry of Defense in Ouagadougou, Burkina Faso, Maj. Gen. William J. Walker, Commanding General, District of Columbia National Guard and Brigade General Moses Miningou, chief of general staff, Armed Forces of Burkina Faso, signed the historic partnership agreement. Together, they agreed to build a mutually rewarding relationship of cooperation, which will be founded on the preservation of mutual interests, to share their cultural diversity and strengthen their capabilities by integrating investment in human capital within the exchanges, and to embark upon a lasting relationship between the National Armed Forces of Burkina Faso and the National Guard of the District of Columbia, in the best interests of security and development. Burkina Faso falls under U.S. Africa Command. Major Tibu T. Cheu is the current District of Columbia Army National Guard Bilateral Affairs Officer for Burkina Faso.

== District of Columbia National Guard Honor Guard ==
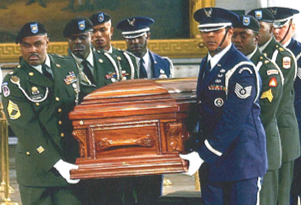
DCNG Honor Guard selected to support the Rosa Parks funeral service during October 2005 at the U.S. Capitol Rotunda.

The District of Columbia National Guard's joint Honor Guard members are full time professionals who are drawn from the ranks of the Army National Guard and Air National Guard. They must meet the highest standards of military bearing, deportment, dress, and appearance to be eligible for participation in the DCNG Honor Guard program. In addition to rendering funeral honors, the DCNG Honor Guard program provides color teams for the District of Columbia, special events and ceremonies.

Notable Memorial Services
Dorothy Height	Rosa Parks

== District of Columbia National Guard Museum ==
The D.C. National Guard Museum, also known as Brigadier General Wes Hamilton Museum, is a military museum of the District of Columbia National Guard. It is located at the District of Columbia National Guard headquarters at the D.C. Armory, adjacent to the Stadium-Armory Metro Stop near Robert F. Kennedy Memorial Stadium.

The collection includes (inside) military artifacts and memorabilia including National Guard weapons, uniforms and diaries, and outside, static displays including an F-16 Fighting Falcon and a UH-1Y Venom Huey helicopter.

Below are a few military artifacts and memorabilia located inside the DCNG museum.

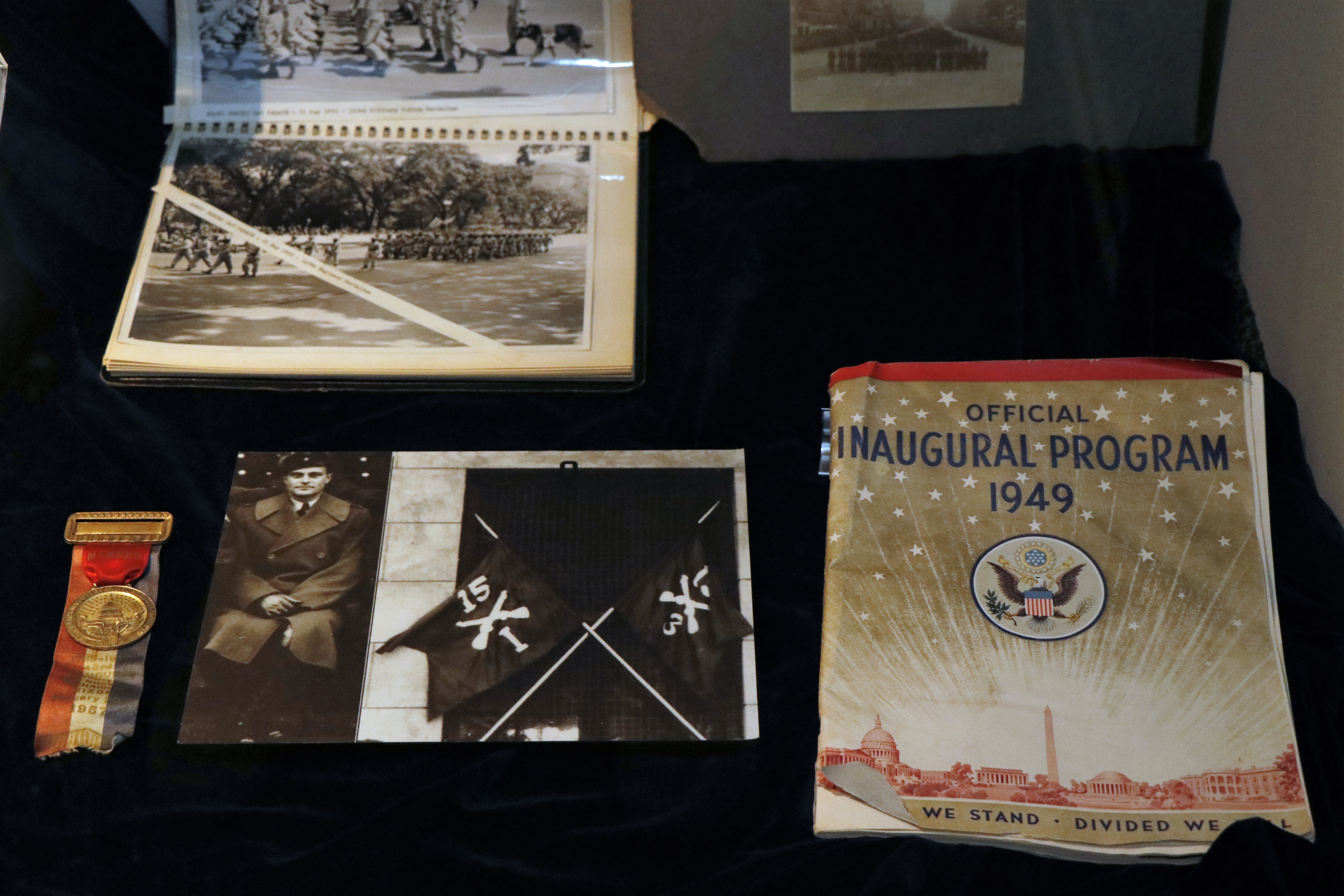
DCNG event program pamphlet artifacts from the 1900s.

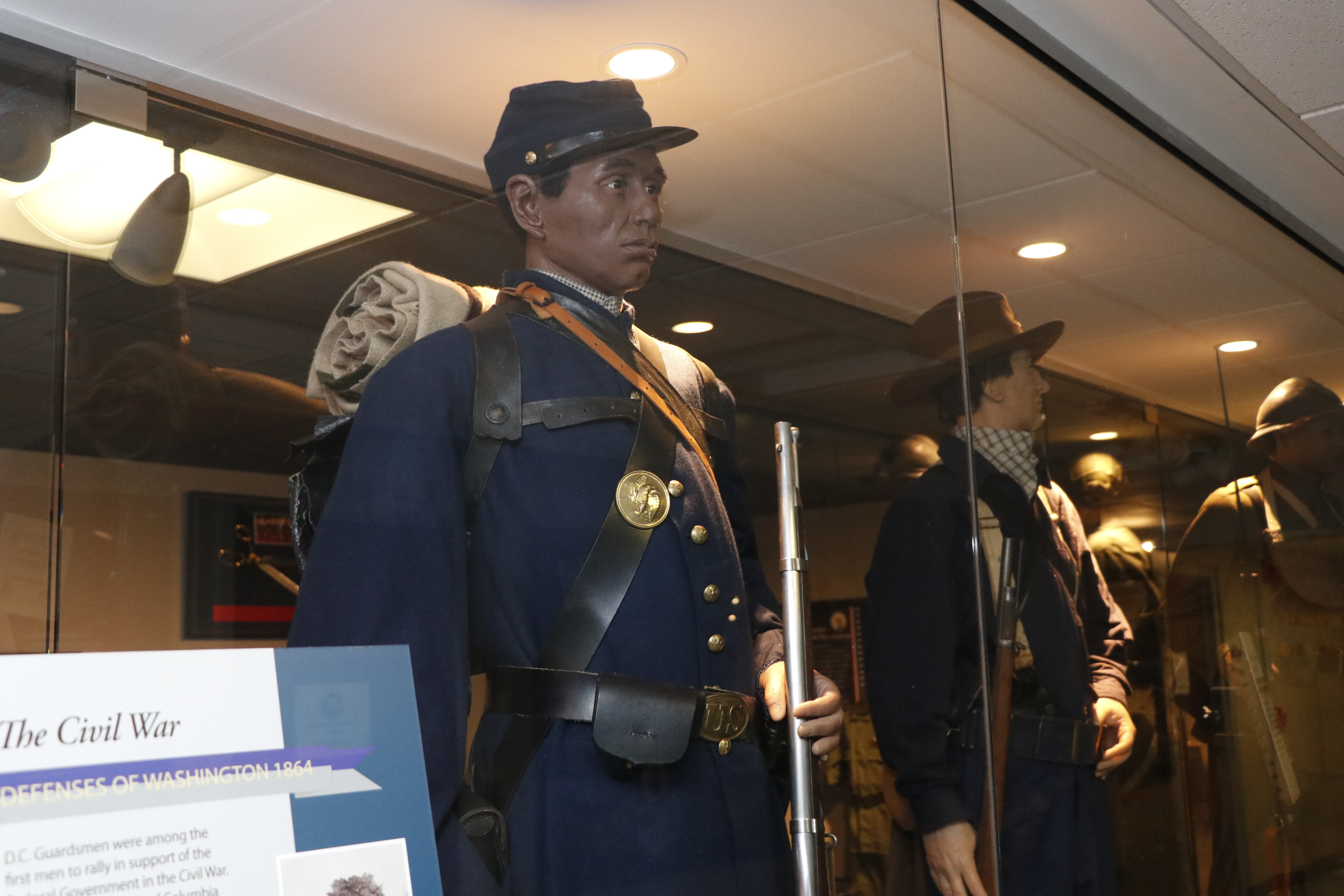
DCNG uniforms worn by Soldiers during U.S. civil war.

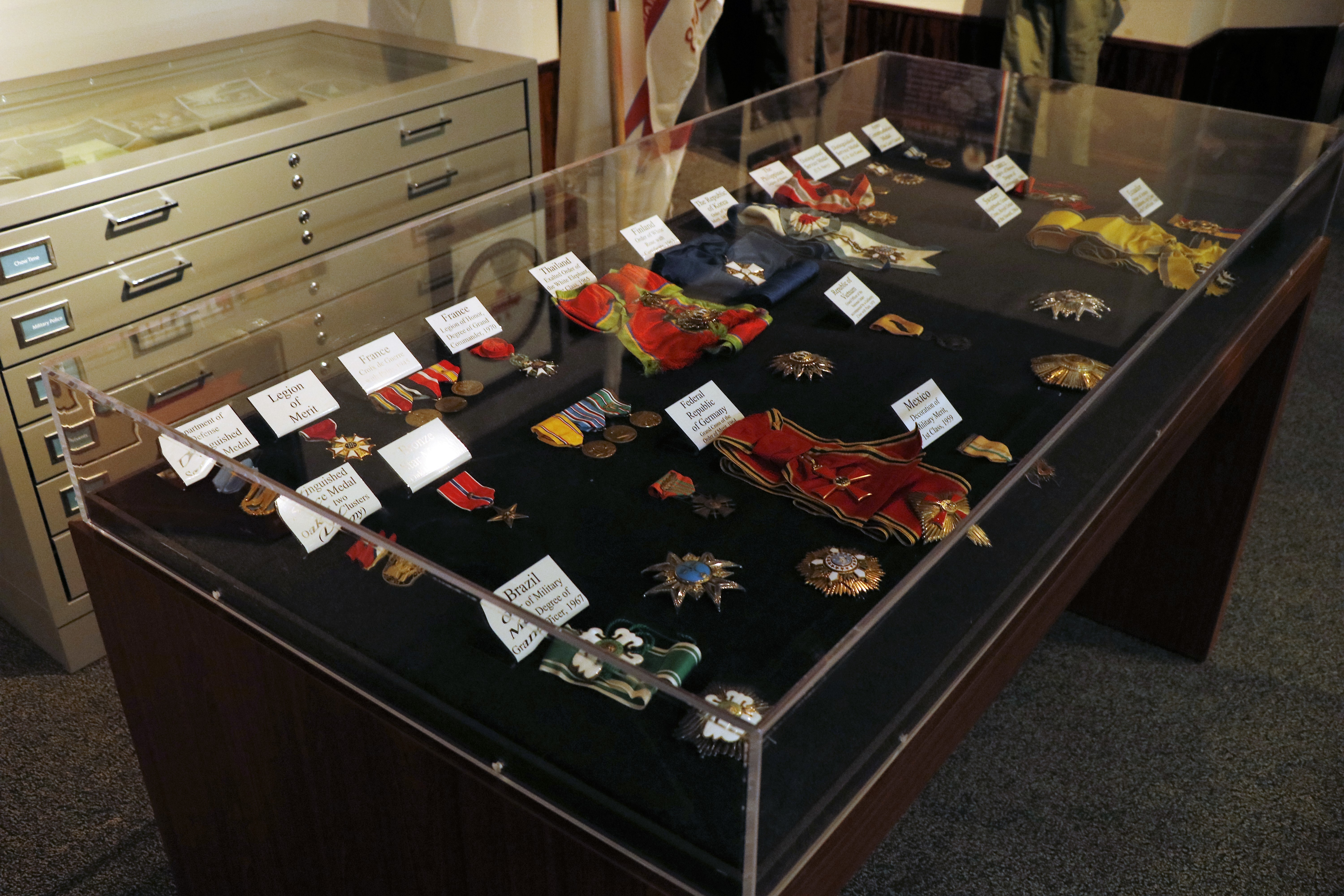
Different Legion of Merit, Bronze Star and DoD Distinguish Service medals and ribbons earned by DCNG service members who served in various oversea campaigns during early to mid-1900s.

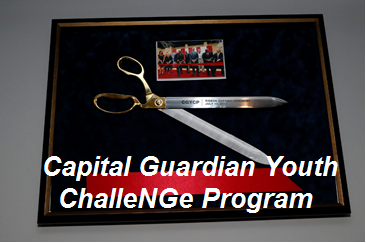
The scissors and ribbon from the ground breaking ceremony to commemorate the land dedicated to the DCNG Capital Guardian Youth Challenge Program.

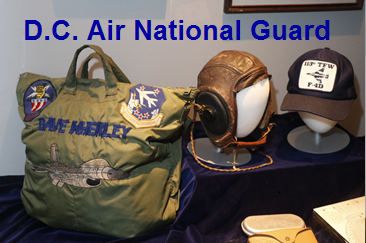
Pilot artifacts from the DCNG museum. The green pilot bag on left, donated by the Wherley family, belonged to DCANG Major General David F. Wherley Jr. (1947-2009).

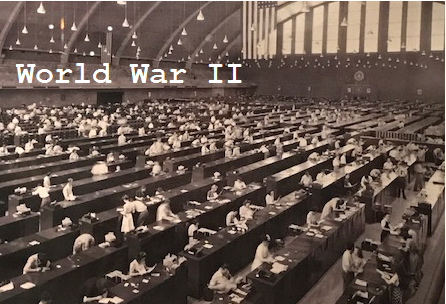
During WWII, the FBI used the DCNG armory as a location to hold finger print records.

== District of Columbia National Guard decorations ==
Awards and decorations of the D.C. National Guard are presented to members of the United States National Guard in addition to regular United States military decorations. The District of Columbia National Guard maintains a series of military decorations for issuance with such awards presented under the authority of the District of Columbia Commanding General.

District of Columbia National Guard Awards:

- District of Columbia Distinguished Service Medal
- District of Columbia Meritorious Service Medal
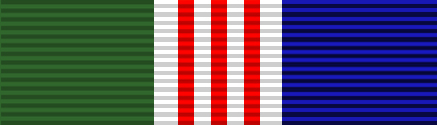
- District of Columbia Commendation Medal
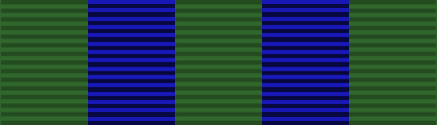
- District of Columbia Achievement Medal
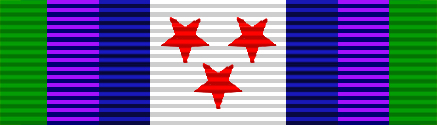
- District of Columbia Homeland Defense Medal (ribbon has three red stars in the center).
- District of Columbia NCO Commendation Ribbon
- District of Columbia Enlisted Excellence Ribbon
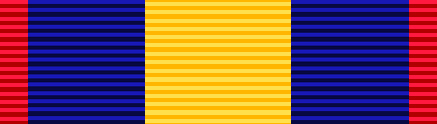
- District of Columbia Long and Faithful Service Medal (one medal for three years, recognition for five years and additional five-year increments noted with Roman Numerals up to 45 years)
- District of Columbia Emergency Service Ribbon (Deactivated)
- District of Columbia Recognition Ribbon
- District of Columbia Special Award Ribbon
- District of Columbia Recruiting and Retention Ribbon (Deactivated)
- District of Columbia Community Service Ribbon
- District of Columbia Ceremonial/Drill Team/Color Guard Ribbon
- District of Columbia Active Duty Ribbon (Deactivated)
- District of Columbia Attendance Ribbon
- District of Columbia Commanding General's Outstanding Unit Award

== Notable District of Columbia guardsmen ==
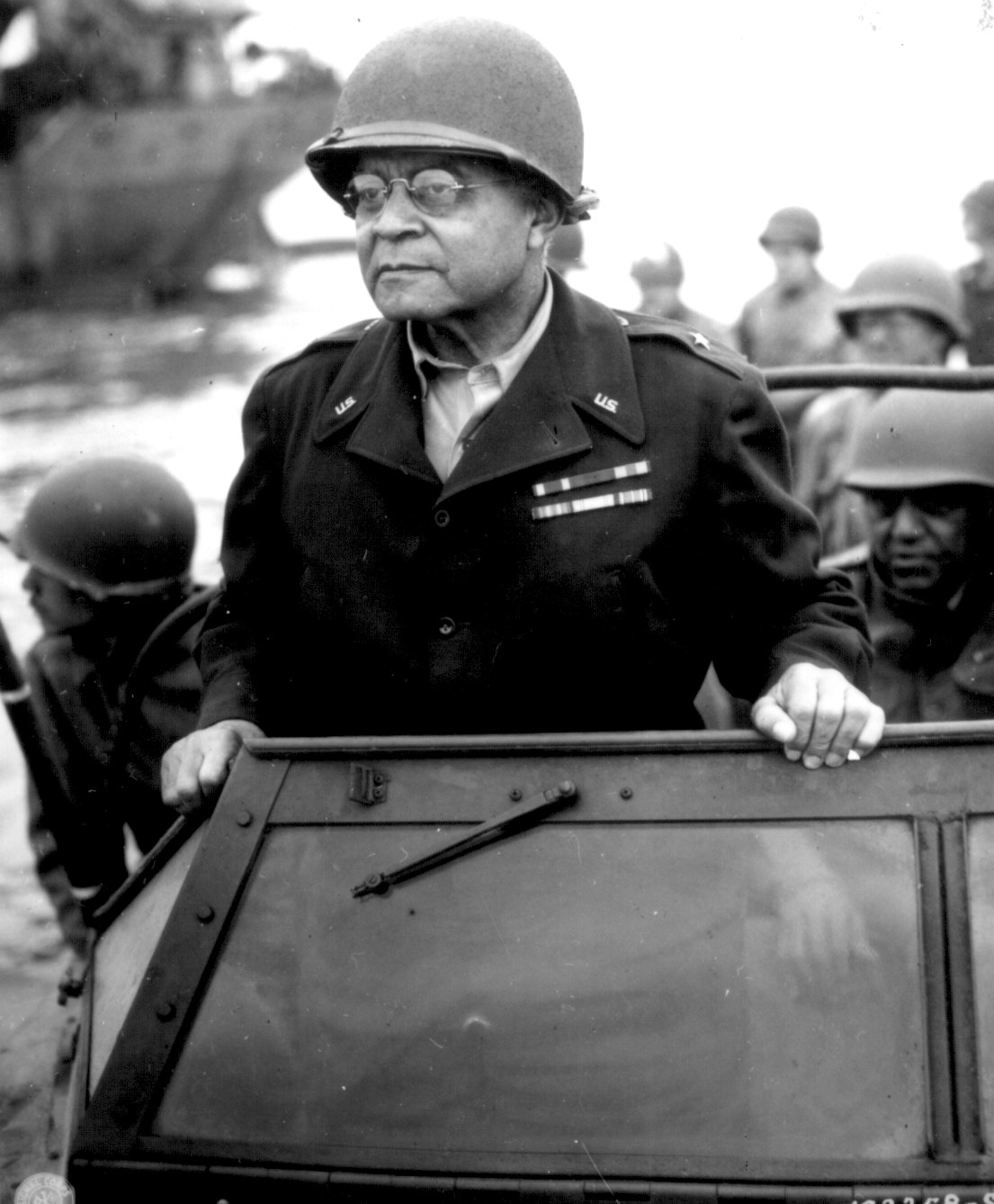
Brigadier General Benjamin Oliver Davis, Sr. joined the DC National Guard in 1899, around the time of the Spanish-American War, for a short period of time after his regiment was disbanded. In the picture above, Davis is somewhere in France, in August, 1944, observing a Signal Corps crew positioning poles.

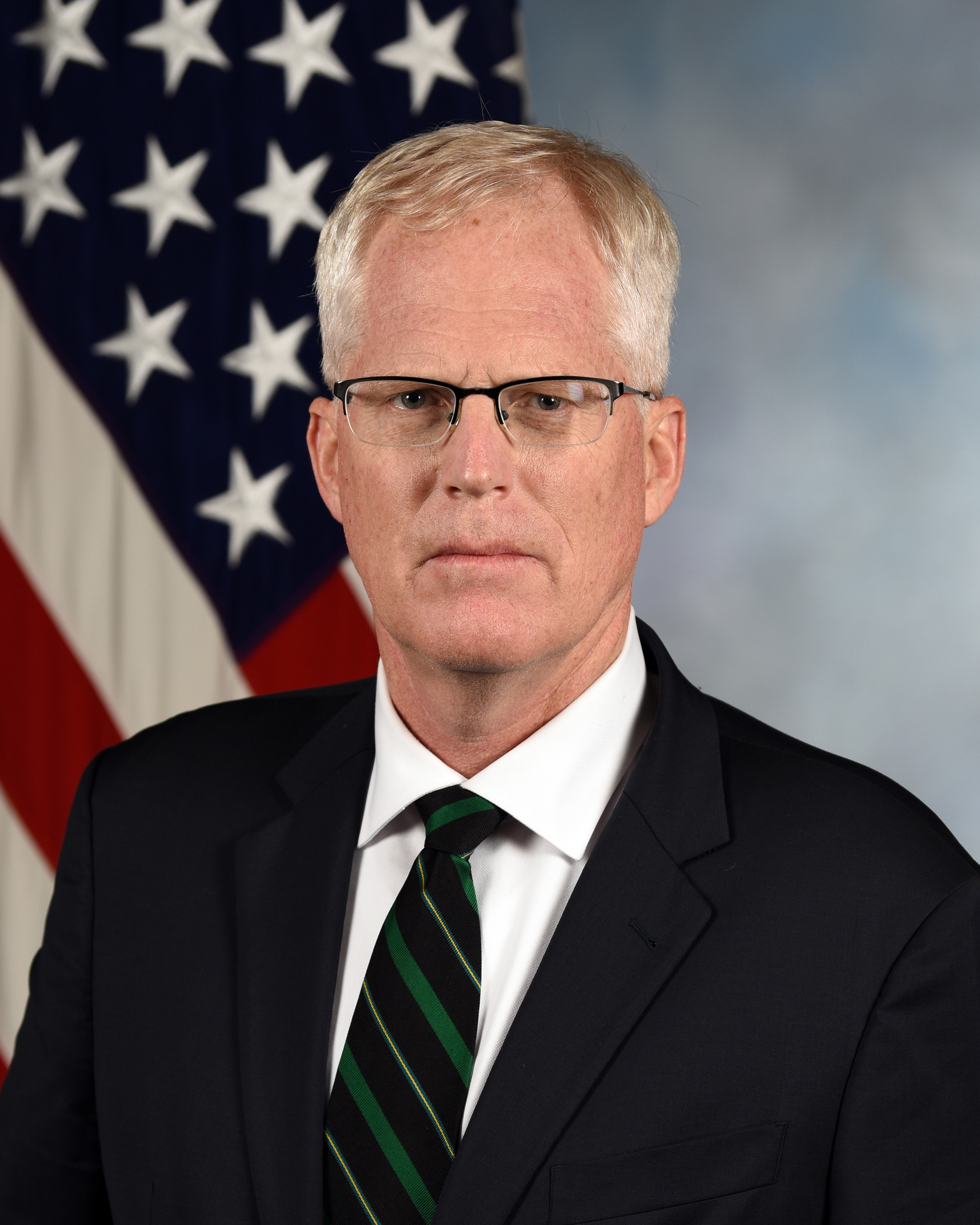
Former U.S. secretary of defense, Christopher C. Miller, served in D.C. National Guard from 1983 to 1985

- Brigadier General John Mason (planter), son of George Mason, a Founding Father of the United States, Mason was the first commanding general of the D.C. Militia, appointed personally by President Thomas Jefferson in 1802.
- Major General John Peter Van Ness, was an American politician who was a United States representative from New York and who served as the tenth mayor of the District of Columbia and the second commanding general of the District of Columbia Militia.
- Lieutenant Francis Scott Key was with the Georgetown Field Artillery of the D.C. Militia. During the British bombardment in Baltimore Harbor, he wrote the poem that is now the lyrics to the Star-Spangled Banner.
- Brigadier General Roger C. Weightman was an American politician, civic leader, and printer. He was the eighth mayor of the District of Columbia from 1824 to 1827 and served as commanding general of the District of Columbia Militia from 1847 to 1849.
- Brigadier General Benjamin Oliver Davis Sr., the first black U.S. Army general, served in the D.C. National Guard in 1898.
- Brigadier General Albert Lyman Cox was a College Football All-Southern Team end for the North Carolina Tar Heels of the University of North Carolina. He was elected as a Democrat in the North Carolina House of Representatives and in 1916, Cox was appointed North Carolina state superior judge.
- Major General William H. Abendroth served as chief of the Army Division (now director of the Army National Guard) at the National Guard Bureau from 1951 to 1955.
- Major General Charles L. Southward served as the chief of the Army Division (now director of the Army National Guard) at the National Guard Bureau from 1964 to 1967.
- Lieutenant General Russell C. Davis was the first African American to serve as National Guard Bureau chief and at the time of his retirement, Davis was the last member of the U.S. Air Force Aviation Cadet program to still be serving on active duty in the U.S. Air Force.
- Major General David F. Wherley Jr. At the time of the September 11 attacks in 2001, Wherley was commander of 113th Wing, the Guard unit responsible for protecting District of Columbia. That morning, Wherley ordered his pilots, who did not launch until after the Pentagon attack, to operate weapons free, meaning that they were permitted to shoot at will.
- General Earle Wheeler, Chairman of the Joint Chiefs of Staff (1964-1970) is the longest serving chairman in the history of Joint Chiefs. He began his military career as a private in Company E, 121st Engineers, D.C. National Guard. Each year Junior Reserve Officers' Training Corps cadets from around the national capital region hold a drill competition in honor of General Wheeler.
- Christopher C. Miller served as the acting U.S. secretary of defense from November 9, 2020, to January 20, 2021. He was appointed as the acting Secretary of Defense on November 9, 2020, by then, President Donald J. Trump, after Trump fired Mark T. Esper as the U.S. Secretary of Defense. During his career, Miller served in the military. Miller served in the District of Columbia National Guard from December 7, 1983, to February 1, 1985, as a military police. Miller was a member of the 276th Military Police Company.
- Mark T. Esper served as the secretary of the Army from 2017 to 2019 and as Secretary of Defense beginning in 2019. Secretary Esper joined the District of Columbia National Guard as an U.S. Army major in the Mobilization Augmentation Command (MAC). On 27 September 2001, following the 9/11 terrorist attacks on America, the MAC was the first Army Reserve component mobilized to support the global war on terrorism. Secretary Esper retired from the U.S. Army Reserves at the rank of Lieutenant Colonel.
- Lieutenant Colonel Charles Moose served as the police chief for Montgomery County during apprehension of the D.C. snipers in October 2002.
- Brigadier General (D.C. Militia) Michael J. Bayer is the president and CEO of Dumbarton Strategies, Washington D.C., which provides strategic advice within the energy and national security sectors.
- Lieutenant General Mark H. Sasseville is a United States Air Force officer who is the first Hispanic to be named Commander of the 113th Wing, District of Columbia Air National Guard at Andrews Air Force Base in Maryland. On September 11, 2001, LTG Sasseville was the acting Operations Group Commander under the 113th Wing of the D.C. Air National Guard. He was one of four pilots given the mission of finding United Flight 93 and destroying it, even if it meant ramming the plane.
- Major General Erneido Oliva was a Cuban-American who was the deputy commander of Brigade 2506 land forces in the abortive Bay of Pigs Invasion of Cuba in April 1961. In July 1987, US president Ronald Reagan, appointed him to the position of Deputy Commanding General of the D.C. Army National Guard.
- Private First Class Michael Bragg is a former American football punter in the National Football League for the Washington Redskins and Baltimore Colts.
- Private First Class Mack Alston was a professional American football tight end in the National Football League for the Washington Redskins, Houston Oilers, and Baltimore Colts.
