= David F. Wherley Jr. =

United States Air Force general (1947–2009)

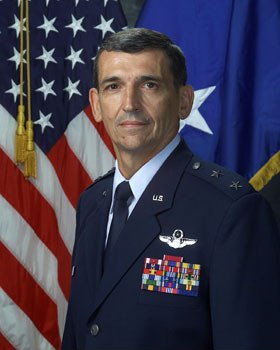
- Major General David F. Wherley Jr.
- Born: February 9, 1947
- Died: June 22, 2009 (aged 62) Washington, D.C.
- Buried: Arlington National Cemetery
- Allegiance: United States
- Branch: United States Air Force
- Service years: 1969–2008
- Rank: Major General
- Commands: 121st Fighter Squadron; 201st Airlift Squadron; 113th Wing; District of Columbia National Guard
- Conflicts: Global War on Terrorism
- Awards: Legion of Merit; Meritorious Service Medal (2); Air Medal; Air Force Commendation Medal
- Spouse: Ann Strine

David Franklin Wherley Jr. (February 9, 1947 – June 22, 2009) was a United States Air Force Major General who served as commander of the District of Columbia National Guard.

== Early life ==
Wherley and his future wife, Ann, attended York Catholic High School together in their hometown of York, Pennsylvania. They graduated in 1965, and married on July 19, 1969.

== Career ==
Wherley began his military career in 1969 when he received his commission as a second lieutenant through the Reserve Officer Training Corps (ROTC) program at Fordham University. He earned his Bachelor of Arts degree from Fordham, and in 1977 gained a Master of Business Administration from the University of Maryland, College Park.

After he was released from active duty Wherley served in a number of staff assignments with the National Guard in Maryland, and for a short time deployed as the deputy operations group commander for fighters at Prince Sultan Air Base in Saudi Arabia. As a pilot and instructor, he clocked up more than 5,000 hours of flying time over a multitude of missions.

Wherley gained his first command in 1985 with the 121st Fighter Squadron, and went on to command Detachment 1 (later to be re-designated 201st Airlift Squadron).

At the time of the 9/11 attacks in 2001, Wherley was commander of 113th Wing, the Guard unit responsible for protecting Washington D.C. That morning, Wherley ordered his pilots, who did not launch until after the Pentagon attack, to operate weapons free, meaning that they were permitted to shoot at will.

Wherley was appointed commanding general of the District of Columbia National Guard in 2003. He retired from that position and from the Air Force in 2008.

== Death ==
On June 22, 2009, Wherley and his wife Ann were killed in a collision between two Red Line trains, shortly after concluding a volunteer orientation program at the Walter Reed Army Medical Center.

The Wherleys were interred together at Arlington National Cemetery on June 30, 2009. (Note: The date of death on the Wherley's headstones is June 23 – the day after the train crash. Some bodies were not discovered in the train wreckage until June 23)

== Assignments ==
1. September 1969 – September 1970, student, undergraduate pilot training, 3576th Student Squadron, Vance Air Force Base, Oklahoma.
2. September 1970 – October 1972, T-38 instructor pilot, 3553rd Pilot Training Squadron, Moody Air Force Base, Georgia.
3. October 1972 – October 1973, T-38 class commander, 3550th Student Squadron, Moody Air Force Base, Georgia.
4. October 1973 – September 1978, F-105 pilot, 121st Fighter Squadron, Andrews Air Force Base, Maryland.
5. September 1978 – June 1982, flight safety officer, National Guard Bureau, Pentagon, Washington, D.C.
6. June 1982 – June 1985, F-4 instructor pilot, 121st Fighter Squadron, Andrews Air Force Base, Maryland.
7. June 1985 – December 1985, operations officer, 121st Fighter Squadron, Andrews Air Force Base, Maryland.
8. December 1985 – July 1987, commander, 121st Fighter Squadron, Andrews Air Force Base, Maryland.
9. July 1987 – March 1989, director of operations, Headquarters, District of Columbia Air National Guard, Washington, D.C.
10. March 1989 – November 1995, commander, Detachment 1/201st Airlift Squadron, Headquarters, District of Columbia Air National Guard, later Andrews Air Force Base, Maryland.
11. November 1995 – December 1997, vice commander, 113th Wing, Andrews Air Force Base, Maryland.
12. January 1998 – April 1998, deputy commander for operations (fighters), 4404th Wing (Provisional), Prince Sultan Air Base, Saudi Arabia
13. May 1998 – June 2003, commander, 113th Wing, Andrews Air Force Base, Maryland.
14. July 2003 – 2008, commanding general, District of Columbia National Guard, Washington, D.C.

== Flight information ==
Rating: Command Pilot
Flight hours: More than 5,000
Aircraft flown: General Dynamics F-16 Fighting Falcon, McDonnell Douglas F-4 Phantom II, Lockheed T-33, Northrop T-38 Talon, Republic F-105 Thunderchief, C-21 Learjet, Boeing C-22, C-38 Courier

== Awards and decorations ==
Legion of Merit
Meritorious Service Medal with one bronze oak leaf cluster
Air Medal
Air Force Commendation Medal
Air Force Outstanding Unit Award with four bronze oak leaf clusters
Air Force Organizational Excellence Award
Combat Readiness Medal with three bronze oak leaf clusters
National Defense Service Medal
Armed Forces Expeditionary Medal
Southwest Asia Service Medal with two bronze oak leaf clusters
Air Force Longevity Service Award with one silver and one bronze oak leaf cluster
Armed Forces Reserve Medal with one gold hourglass
Small Arms Expert Marksmanship Ribbon
Air Force Training Ribbon
District of Columbia Distinguished Service Medal
