= People's Coalition for Peace and Justice =

National Coalition Against War, Racism, and Repression

The People's Coalition for Peace and Justice (PCPJ) was an umbrella organization of various antiwar and social justice groups in the United States. The PCPJ was founded in September 1970 as the National Coalition Against War, Racism, and Repression (NCAWRR). In January 1971 NCAWRR disbanded and its leadership reconstituted as People's Coalition for Peace and Justice. PCPJ organized the People's Peace Treaty, the Citizen's Action Pledge, and the Evict Nixon campaign, each of which aimed to end American involvement in the Vietnam War.

PCPJ organized a People's Lobby for the last week of April 1971 to lobby members of Congress to end the war in Vietnam. PCPJ supported the Mayday civil disobedience action in Washington DC on May 3, 1971.

Notable members and leaders of PCPJ included David Dellinger, William Douthard, Robert E. Levering, Bradford Lyttle, Sidney M. Peck, Pat Samuel, Barbara Webster, Cora Weiss, and Ronald J. Young.
