= Mobilization Augmentation Command =

Multi-Agency Augmentation Command (MAC)
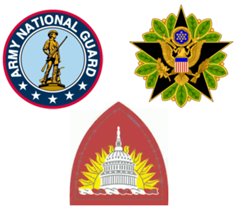
- District of Columbia District Area Command
- Country: United States of America
- Branch: Army National Guard
- Type: Headquarters
- Part of: National Guard
- Garrison/HQ: D.C. Armory

Commanders
- Current commander: Colonel Paul Franken
- Notable commanders: Major General William J. Walker; Colonel Dominic D. Archibald; Colonel Roosevelt Barfield

The Headquarters of the United States Department of the Army (HQDA) approved its Command Implementation Plan (CIP) to restructure the District of Columbia Army National Guard (DCARNG) Area Mobilization Command. As part of this restructuring, the Mobilization Augmentation Command (MAC) received a name change as of 22 September 2016. The new name is Multi-Agency Augmentation Command (MAC). HQDA stated the restructure was made in order to provide flexibility and support to the DCARNG's unique state and federal missions.

The MAC is a 0-7 level Table of Distribution and Allowances (TDA) command of the District of Columbia Army National Guard and provides trained personnel for staff augmentation and operational support to Headquarters, Department of the Army, Operations Center (AOC), the Alternate Army Operations Center (AAOC), the Domestic Operations Support Division (DOMS), the National Guard Coordination Center (NGCC), ARNG Domestic Operation Center, National Guard Bureau – Legislative Liaison (NGB-LL) and other Operations Centers in support of routine, national crisis or wartime requirements. The MAC also supports National Special Security Events and the State of the Union Address. As required, the Command provides staff capability packages to augment the District of Columbia National Guard, Joint Task Force for Domestic Support to Civil Authorities operations.

== History ==
The District of Columbia National Guard descends from the 25th Battalion of the Maryland Militia, Headquartered in Georgetown, Maryland, formed 1776 to fight in the American Revolutionary War. After Congress established the Federal District in District of Columbia Organic Act of 1801, local Militia units were reorganized again, to form what would become the District of Columbia National Guard. Supervision and control of District of Columbia National Guard was delegated by the President of the United States to the Secretary of Defense pursuant to Executive Order 10030, 26 January 1949 with authority given to the Secretary to designate officials of the National Military Establishment to administer affairs of the District of Columbia National Guard. The Secretary of the Army was directed to act for the Secretary of Defense in all matters pertaining to the ground component, and the Secretary of the Air Force was directed to act in all matters pertaining to the air component of the District of Columbia National Guard by Secretary of Defense memorandum, 2 February 1949. Founded in 1997, the Mobilization Augmentation Detachment of the DC National Guard primary mission was to support the National Guard Bureau Operations Staff and Emergency Operations Center in Arlington, Virginia. On 27 September 2001, following the 9/11 terrorist attacks on America, the unit was the first Army Reserve component mobilized to support the global war on terrorism. Due to the MAC's quality of performance and commitment to missions, a decision was made by the commanding general, to expand the unit into a Command, with a larger role, and opportunities for over 100 Officers and NCOs. The MAC is heavily involved in operations throughout the National Capital Region.

== Current Divisions ==
- Army National Guard (ARNG) Operations support Division
- Department of the Army (DA) Operations Support Division
- Homeland Security and Emergency Management Agency (HSEMA) DC Operations
- Joint Operations Support Division
- National Guard Bureau (NGB) Plans and Operations Division

== Commanders ==
CDR	CSM	SGM
RANK: Colonel; NAME: Paul Franken; BEGIN DATE: 1 October 2020; END DATE: Present	RANK: CSM; NAME: Brian D. Jones; BEGIN DATE: 15 August 2020; END DATE: Present	RANK: SGM; NAME: Porsha Scott; BEGIN DATE: 1 March 2021; END DATE: Present
RANK: Colonel; NAME: Paul Franken; BEGIN DATE: 1 October 2020; END DATE: Present	RANK: CSM; NAME: Brian D. Jones; BEGIN DATE: 15 August 2020; END DATE: Present	RANK: SGM; NAME: Piper Sutton; BEGIN DATE: 5 February 2018; END DATE: 28 February 2021
RANK: Colonel; NAME: Andrew C. Diefenthaler; BEGIN DATE: 21 July 2017; END DATE: 30 September 2020	VACANT	RANK: SGM; NAME: Piper Sutton; BEGIN DATE: 5 February 2018; END DATE: 28 February 2021
RANK: Colonel; NAME: Andrew C. Diefenthaler; BEGIN DATE: 21 July 2017; END DATE: 30 September 2020	VACANT	RANK: SGM; NAME: Deborah Witherspoon; BEGIN DATE: 30 July 2015; END DATE: 31 December 2018
RANK: Colonel; NAME: R. Kenneth Ryan; BEGIN DATE: 3 March 2015; END DATE: 20 July 2017	RANK: CSM; NAME: Tracy Amos; BEGIN DATE: 1 October 2015; END DATE: 4 August 2016	RANK: SGM; NAME: Deborah Witherspoon; BEGIN DATE: 30 July 2015; END DATE: 31 December 2018
RANK: Colonel; NAME: William J. Walker; BEGIN DATE: 1 March 2013; END DATE: 2 March 2015	RANK: CSM; NAME: Jeffery T. Credle; BEGIN DATE: 1 April 2014; END DATE: 30 December 2014	RANK: SGM; NAME: Tracy Amos; BEGIN DATE: 22 July 2012; END DATE: 30 September 2015
RANK: Colonel; NAME: Brian E. Tate; BEGIN DATE: 1 February 2012; END DATE: 28 February 2013	RANK: CSM; NAME: Jeffery T. Credle; BEGIN DATE: 1 January 2011; END DATE: 28 February 2013	VACANT
RANK: Colonel; NAME: Gregory Castello; BEGIN DATE: 16 July 2009; END DATE: 31 January 2012	RANK: CSM; NAME: Tracy B. Underwood; BEGIN DATE: 1 April 2008; END DATE: 31 December 2010	RANK: SGM; NAME: Jeffery T. Credle; BEGIN DATE: 16 July 2009; END DATE: 1 January 2011
RANK: Colonel; NAME: Thomas U. Washington; BEGIN DATE: 1 July 2008; END DATE: 16 July 2009	RANK: Acting CSM; NAME: Jeffery T. Credle; BEGIN DATE: 1 July 2008; END DATE: 16 July 2009	VACANT
RANK: Colonel; NAME:Dominic Archibald; BEGIN DATE: 16 November 2006; END DATE: 30 June 2008	RANK: CSM; NAME: Richard N. Esponosa; BEGIN DATE: 16 November 2006; END DATE: 30 June 2008	RANK: SGM; NAME: Jeffery T. Credle; BEGIN DATE: 16 November 2006; END DATE: 30 June 2008
RANK: Brigadier General; NAME: Roosevelt Barfield; BEGIN DATE: 4 February 2004; END DATE: 18 November 2006	RANK: CSM; NAME: Patricia A. Williamson; BEGIN DATE: 4 February 2004; END DATE: 18 November 2006	NA
RANK: Major General; NAME: Randy E. Manner; BEGIN DATE: 3 December 1997; END DATE: 18 November 2003	RANK: CSM; NAME: Patricia A. Williamson; BEGIN DATE: 4 February 2004; END DATE: 18 November 2006	NA
