= Russell C. Davis (general) =

United States Air Force Lieutenant General (born 1938)

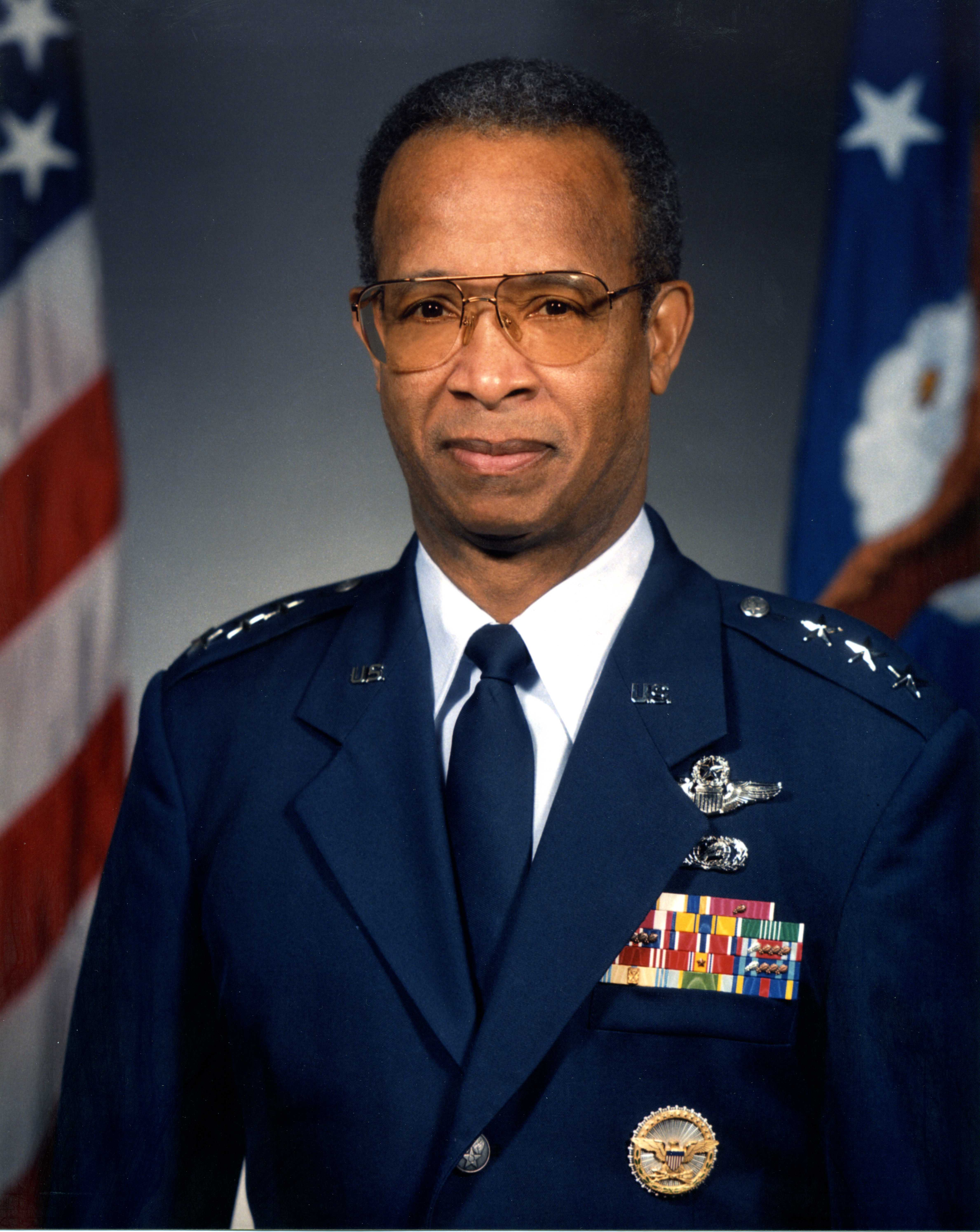
- Lieutenant General (Ret.) Russell C. Davis
- Born: October 22, 1938 (age 88); Tuskegee, Alabama, U.S.
- Military career
- Allegiance: United States of America
- Branch: United States Air Force
- Service years: 1958–2002
- Rank: Lieutenant general
- Units: United States Air Force; Iowa Air National Guard; D.C. National Guard; National Guard Bureau
- Commands: 113th Tactical Fighter Wing; D.C. National Guard; National Guard Bureau
- Awards: Air Force Distinguished Service Medal; Legion of Merit (2); Meritorious Service Medal (2); Air Force Commendation Medal (2); Army Commendation Medal; Combat Readiness Medal (9); Army Good Conduct Medal; National Defense Service Medal (2); Armed Forces Reserve Medal
- Other work: Attorney

Russell C. Davis (born October 22, 1938) is a retired United States Air Force lieutenant general who served as commander of the District of Columbia National Guard and Chief of the National Guard Bureau.

== Early life ==
Russell C. Davis was born in Tuskegee, Alabama, on October 22, 1938, and graduated from Tuskegee Institute High School. As recounted in a speech at Simpson College, Davis's great-great grandfather, a former slave, helped raise money to found what now is known as Tuskegee University. Davis's grandfather worked with George Washington Carver at Tuskegee, and Davis related that when he was a child attending a nursery school on campus, Carver was still a well-known figure at the school, the "tall man in a lab coat who gave us children candy."

He began his military career in 1958 as an aviation cadet in the United States Air Force, and he received his commission in 1960. Following pilot training, he was assigned at Lincoln Air Force Base, Nebraska, and he graduated from the University of Nebraska Omaha with a Bachelor of Arts degree in general education in 1963. After serving as a bomber pilot, he was released from active duty in April, 1965 and joined the Iowa Air National Guard as an interceptor pilot.

== Start of National Guard career ==
Upon release from active duty, Davis joined the 132nd Fighter Wing, Iowa Air National Guard in Des Moines. He served in numerous command and staff positions from squadron pilot to director of operations, and advanced through the ranks to colonel.

In 1969, Davis completed his Juris Doctor degree at Drake University and became an attorney. He actively practiced until 1979, when he went back on active duty with the Air National Guard. Davis graduated from the Air Command and Staff College in 1973 and the Industrial College of the Armed Forces in 1979.

== Later National Guard career ==
In June, 1979 Davis was appointed as chief of manpower and personnel at the Air National Guard Support Center, Andrews Air Force Base, Maryland. From March 1980 to January 1982, he was executive officer to the director of the Air National Guard.

From February 1982 to July 1990, he commanded the 113th Tactical Fighter Wing, and he was promoted to brigadier general in December, 1982. Davis was the first African-American to become a general officer in the Air National Guard.

In 1989 Davis graduated from the National and International Security Management Course at Harvard University.

Davis was the assistant for national guard matters for the commander of the Tactical Air Command from July, 1990 to December, 1991. He was promoted to major general in August, 1990.

== D.C. National Guard ==
In December 1991 Davis was appointed commander of the District of Columbia National Guard. He served in this position until December 1995.

== National Guard Bureau ==
In December 1995 Davis was appointed Vice Chief of the National Guard Bureau. He held this post until August, 1998, when he was named chief of the National Guard Bureau and promoted to lieutenant general. Davis was the first African-American to serve as NGB chief, and he held the position until retiring on November 1, 2002.

At the time of his retirement, Davis was the last member of the U.S. Air Force Aviation Cadet program to still be serving on active duty in the U.S. Air Force.

== Retirement ==
Davis was active in several educational and civic endeavors, including serving as member of the Drake University board of trustees and president of National Tuskegee Airmen, Inc. He also works as a consultant in national securities, homeland security/defense, aviation operations and safety, training and development, equal opportunity and diversity and a wide variety of legal issues.

== Education ==
- 1963 Bachelor of Arts degree in general education, University of Nebraska Omaha, Omaha
- 1969 Juris Doctor degree in law, Drake University, Des Moines, Iowa
- 1973 Air Command and Staff College, by correspondence
- 1975 National Security Management Course, by correspondence
- 1979 Industrial College of the Armed Forces, Fort Lesley J. McNair, Washington, D.C.
- 1989 National and International Security Management Course, Harvard University, Cambridge, Massachusetts

== Assignments ==
- December 1958 – March 1960, undergraduate pilot training, Graham Air Base, Florida and Vance AFB, Oklahoma
- March 1960 – October 1960, strategic bombardment pilot, 4347th Combat Crew Training Wing, McConnell AFB, Kansas
- October 1960 – April 1965, bomber pilot, 344th Bomber Squadron, Lincoln AFB, Nebraska
- April 1965 – September 1968, pilot, 124th Fighter Interceptor Squadron, Iowa ANG, Des Moines
- September 1968 – September 1970, flight commander, 124th Tactical Fighter Squadron, Iowa National Guard, Des Moines
- September 1970 – June 1977, air operations officer, 132nd Tactical Fighter Group, Iowa ANG, Des Moines
- June 1977 – October 1978, officer in charge, Command Post, 132nd Tactical Fighter Wing, Iowa ANG, Des Moines
- October 1978 – June 1979, deputy commander of operations, Headquarters Iowa ANG, Des Moines
- June 1979 – February 1980, deputy chief of manpower and personnel, Air National Guard Support Center, Andrews AFB, Maryland
- March 1980 – January 1982, executive to the chief of the National Guard Bureau, the Pentagon, Washington, D.C.
- February 1982 – July 1990, wing commander, 113th Tactical Fighter Wing, District of Columbia ANG, Andrews AFB, Maryland
- July 1990 – December 1991, Air National Guard assistant to the commander of Tactical Air Command, Langley AFB, Virginia
- December 1991 – December 1995, commanding general, District of Columbia National Guard, Washington, D.C.
- December 1995 – August 1998, vice chief, NGB, the Pentagon, Washington, D.C.
- August 1998 – November 2002, chief, NGB, Arlington, Virginia

== Flight information ==
- Rating: Command pilot
- Flight hours: More than 4,700
- Aircraft flown: B-47, T-33, F-89, F-84, F-100, A-7, F-4 and F-16

== Awards and decorations ==
US Air Force Command Pilot Badge

Air Force Distinguished Service Medal
Legion of Merit with bronze oak leaf cluster
Meritorious Service Medal with bronze oak leaf cluster
Air Force Commendation Medal
Army Commendation Medal
Air Force Outstanding Unit Award with four bronze oak leaf clusters
Air Force Organizational Excellence Award
Combat Readiness Medal with silver and three bronze oak leaf clusters
Army Good Conduct Medal
National Defense Service Medal with bronze service star
Air Force Longevity Service Award with silver and three bronze oak leaf cluster
Air Force Longevity Service Award (tenth award requires second ribbon due to accouterment spacing)
Armed Forces Reserve Medal with gold hourglass device
Small Arms Expert Marksmanship Ribbon
Air Force Training Ribbon

Other awards and achievements

- 1956–1958: University scholar, Tuskegee University
- 1969: Jury Award, Drake University Law School
- 1984: NAACP Roy Wilkins Achievement Award
- 1985: Air Force Association Service Award, Air Force Association Headquarters
- 1985: Tuskegee Airmen Achievement Award
- 1987: Tuskegee Airmen Achievement and Service Award
- 1988: Ira Eaker Fellow, Tony Anthony Chapter, AFA
- 1990: Howard Kacy Flying Safety Award, District of Columbia ANG
- 1992–1998: Drake University Board of Trustees
- 2012 Carver Medal, Simpson College

== Effective dates of promotion ==
Promotions
Insignia	Rank	Date
	Lieutenant General	September 1, 1998
	Major general	August 3, 1990
	Brigadier general	December 16, 1982
	Colonel	January 26, 1979
	Lieutenant colonel	October 13, 1973
	Major	March 19, 1969
	Captain	March 18, 1965
	First lieutenant	March 18, 1963
	Second lieutenant	March 18, 1960

== Attribution ==
Military offices
Preceded by LTG Edward D. Baca	Chief of the National Guard Bureau; 1998 - 2002	Succeeded by MG Raymond F. Rees (acting)
