= Edward D. Baca =

United States Army General (1938–2020)

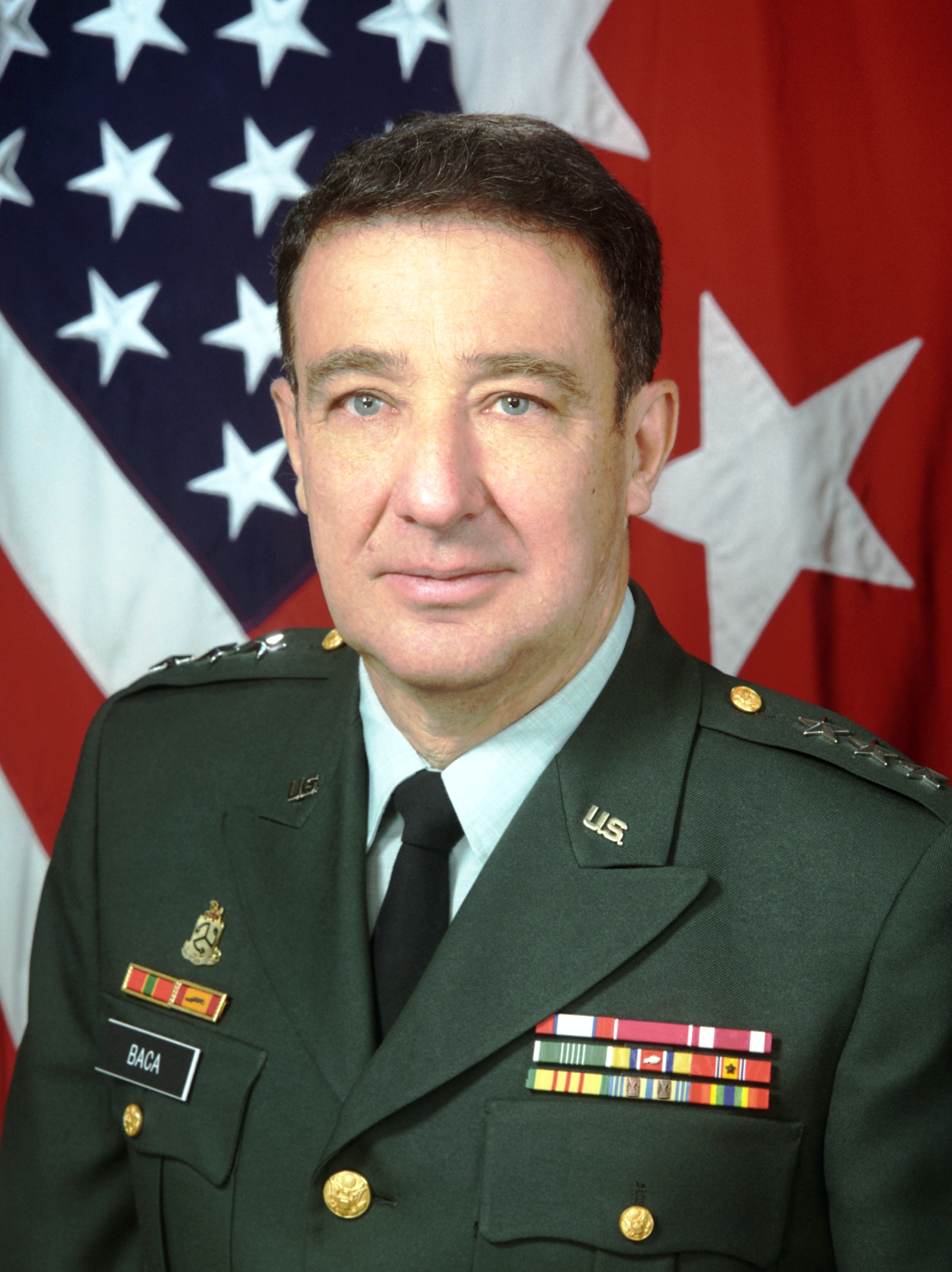
- LTG Edward Baca, Chief, National Guard Bureau
- Born: July 27, 1938; Santa Fe, New Mexico, US
- Died: September 15, 2020 (aged 82); Albuquerque, New Mexico, US
- Burial place: Santa Fe National Cemetery
- Military career
- Allegiance: United States of America
- Branch: United States Army
- Service years: 1956–1998
- Rank: Lieutenant General
- Commands: Adjutant General, New Mexico National Guard; Chief of the National Guard Bureau
- Conflicts: Vietnam War
- Awards: Army Distinguished Service Medal; Legion of Merit; Meritorious Service Medal; Army Commendation Medal
- Other work: Leadership and management consultant

Edward Dionicio Baca (July 27, 1938 – September 15, 2020) was a lieutenant general in the United States Army who was the first Hispanic to serve as Chief of the National Guard Bureau.

== Early life ==
Edward Baca was born in Santa Fe, New Mexico, on July 27, 1938, into a family with a long history in New Mexico. His mother, Delphine Garcia, was indigenous to New Mexico and one of the first major female Mexican political activists in New Mexico. His father, Ernesto, was a veteran of both World War II and the Korean War. Baca's ancestors arrived in Mexico City with the conquistadores in the 16th century and participated in the Oñate expedition that resulted in the founding of the Province of New Mexico. Two of his great-grandfathers fought in the Civil War.

One of six children, Baca attended St. Michael's High School in Santa Fe, helping to pay the tuition by working on construction crews during summers. His father died shortly after Baca's high school graduation. Seeking to help Baca recover and begin a career, a cousin convinced him to join the National Guard, and on November 19, 1956, he became a member of Battery C, 726th Anti-Aircraft Artillery Battalion.

== OCS and active duty service ==
Baca graduated from Officer Candidate School in July, 1962 and became a platoon leader in the 3631st Maintenance Company. He soon applied for an overseas active duty assignment, and was deployed to South Vietnam. Upon his release from active duty on February 22, 1966, Baca returned to New Mexico and took command of the 3631st.

== National Guard leader ==
Baca continued to advance through the ranks in a series of command and staff assignments. On January 30, 1977, he became the military personnel officer for the New Mexico Army National Guard. He was later assigned as Assistant Deputy Chief of Staff for Personnel (G1). In 1979 Baca was promoted to Brigadier General and appointed the State Command Administrative Officer and Secretary of the General Staff.

In 1983 Baca was appointed by Governor Toney Anaya to be Adjutant General of the New Mexico National Guard and promoted to Major General. His tenure was marked by a number of accomplishments, including taking part in an effort to modernize the National Guard nationwide, including the deployment of the Army's only Roland Air Defense battalion. He also had a role in the fielding of Chaparral and Hawk missile battalions in the Army Reserve. In addition, the New Mexico National Guard's Drug Demand Reduction Program was praised by the National Guard Bureau and used as a pilot program for similar programs in other states.

In 1994 Baca was promoted to Lieutenant General and appointed Chief of the National Guard Bureau by President Bill Clinton.

In 1995, the United States Department of Defense planned to cut the number of National Guard combat divisions by 50% in order to allocate more funding to active duty forces. Baca strongly resisted this attempt, replying to those in the Pentagon who called for a justification of Guard combat units' contribution to national security: "There were a lot of folks who said the same thing before World War II, 'Where's the threat?'" By 1998, his efforts paid off when Guardsmen were needed to supplement the US complement for SFOR in Bosnia, and were available, enabling the National Guard to deploy its first combat unit overseas in nearly thirty years. Of this time, Baca was able to say of the Guard's capacity: "We've got a reserve of untapped ability before we'd ever feel a pinch."

In 1998, Baca unsuccessfully attempted to have the Armed Services Vocational Aptitude Battery changed to eliminate what he perceived as cultural biases.

Baca remained Chief until his retirement on July 31, 1998. After retirement he led a leadership training and consulting business in Albuquerque, New Mexico.

== Personal life ==
Baca was married to Rita Hennigan of Muenster, Texas. The couple had seven children—Brian (1961-2024), Brenda, Karen Nielsen, Mark, Michelle, David, and Daniel (1974-2015). Four served in the military, including two who were members of the New Mexico National Guard. Baca died from leukemia on September 15, 2020, at the age of 82. He was buried at Santa Fe National Cemetery.

== Education ==
Baca attended the College of Santa Fe, and in 1986 he received a Bachelor of Science degree in Liberal Arts from Regents College of the University of the State of New York (now Excelsior University). He was a graduate of the Ordnance Officer Basic and Advanced Courses and the Command and General Staff Officer Course.

== Awards ==
Among LTG Baca's decorations were:

- Army Distinguished Service Medal
- Legion of Merit
- Meritorious Service Medal
- Army Commendation Medal
- Army Reserve Component Achievement Award with Silver Oak Leaf Cluster
- National Defense Service Medal with one Bronze Service Star
- Vietnam Service Medal
- Armed Forces Reserve Medal with two Hourglass Devices
- Vietnam Gallantry Cross with Palm

Other awards

- Honorary Doctorate of Law, New Mexico State University
- Honorary Member, Military Order of the Purple Heart.

== Notes ==
Military offices
Preceded by MG Raymond F. Rees (acting)	Chief of the National Guard Bureau; 1994–1998	Succeeded by LTG Russell C. Davis
