= Charles L. Southward =

United States Army officer

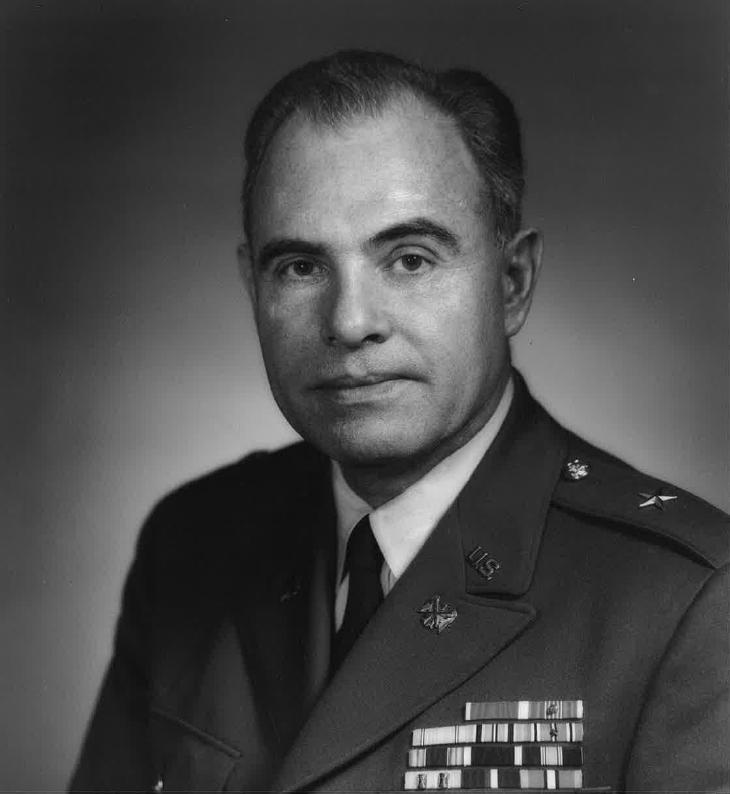
- Southward as Chief of the Army Division, c. 1965.
- Born: May 16, 1912; Richmond, Virginia, US
- Died: April 28, 2000 (aged 87); Williamsburg, Virginia, US
- Burial place: Arlington National Cemetery
- Military career
- Allegiance: United States
- Branch: United States Army
- Service years: 1930–1974
- Rank: Major general
- Units: Virginia Army National Guard; Army National Guard
- Commands: 176th Regimental Combat Team; Army National Guard; District of Columbia National Guard
- Conflicts: World War II
- Awards: Distinguished Service Medal (U.S. Army); Legion of Merit
- Other work: Veterans’ Counselor, Business Specialist, United States Department of Commerce

Charles Lutcher Southward (May 16, 1912 – April 28, 2000) was a United States Army major general who served as director of the Army National Guard and commander of the District of Columbia National Guard.

== Early life ==
Charles Lutcher Southward was born in Richmond, Virginia, on May 16, 1912. He graduated from John Marshall High School, joined the Virginia National Guard in 1930, and attained the rank of first sergeant before receiving his commission as a second lieutenant in 1935.

Between 1935 and 1940 Southward advanced to captain, and he graduated from the United States Army Command and General Staff College in 1939.

== World War II ==
During World War II Southward served on the staff of Army Forces Pacific, South West Pacific Command as a member of the Logistics (G4) section. During the war he was promoted twice, leaving active duty as a lieutenant colonel.

== Post World War II ==
After the war Southward pursued a full-time career with the federal government, serving as a Veterans’ Counselor and Business Specialist with the United States Department of Commerce in Richmond.

He continued his military service, and in the 1950s was commander of the 176th Regimental Combat Team with the rank of colonel.

Southward graduated from the United States Army War College in 1954.

== National Guard Bureau ==
In 1954 Southward was assigned to full-time duty at the National Guard Bureau, serving as head of the Policy and Liaison Office. In the early 1960s he served on the staff of the Continental Army Command.

From 1964 to 1967 Southward was Chief of the Army Division, (now Director of the Army National Guard), receiving promotion to brigadier general.

Southward was appointed Commander of the District of Columbia National Guard in 1967 and promoted to major general. He served until retiring in 1974.

== Awards and decorations ==
Southward's awards included: Distinguished Service Medal with oak leaf cluster; Legion of Merit; Army Commendation Medal with oak leaf cluster; American Defense Service Medal; American Campaign Medal; Asiatic-Pacific Campaign Medal with service star; World War II Victory Medal; Army of Occupation Medal (Japan), National Defense Service Medal with service star, Armed Forces Reserve Medal with gold hourglass; Philippine Defense Medal; Philippine Liberation Medal; Philippine Republic Presidential Unit Citation; Virginia National Guard Legion of Merit; Alabama Commendation Medal; and Mississippi Magnolia Medal.

== Death and burial ==
Southward died in Williamsburg, Virginia, on April 28, 2000. He is buried at Arlington National Cemetery, Section 65, Site 3264.

== Legacy ==
The District of Columbia National Guard presents the annual Southward Leadership Award. The Southward Trophy is awarded to the outstanding Army and Air National Guard leaders in the organization.
