= Inauguration of Barack Obama =

Inauguration of Barack Obama may refer to:

- First inauguration of Barack Obama, 2009
- Second inauguration of Barack Obama, 2013

== See also ==
- The full text of Barack Obama's First Inaugural Address at Wikisource
- The full text of Barack Obama's Second Inaugural Address at Wikisource
