= 201st Airlift Squadron =

United States Air Force unit

201st Airlift Squadron

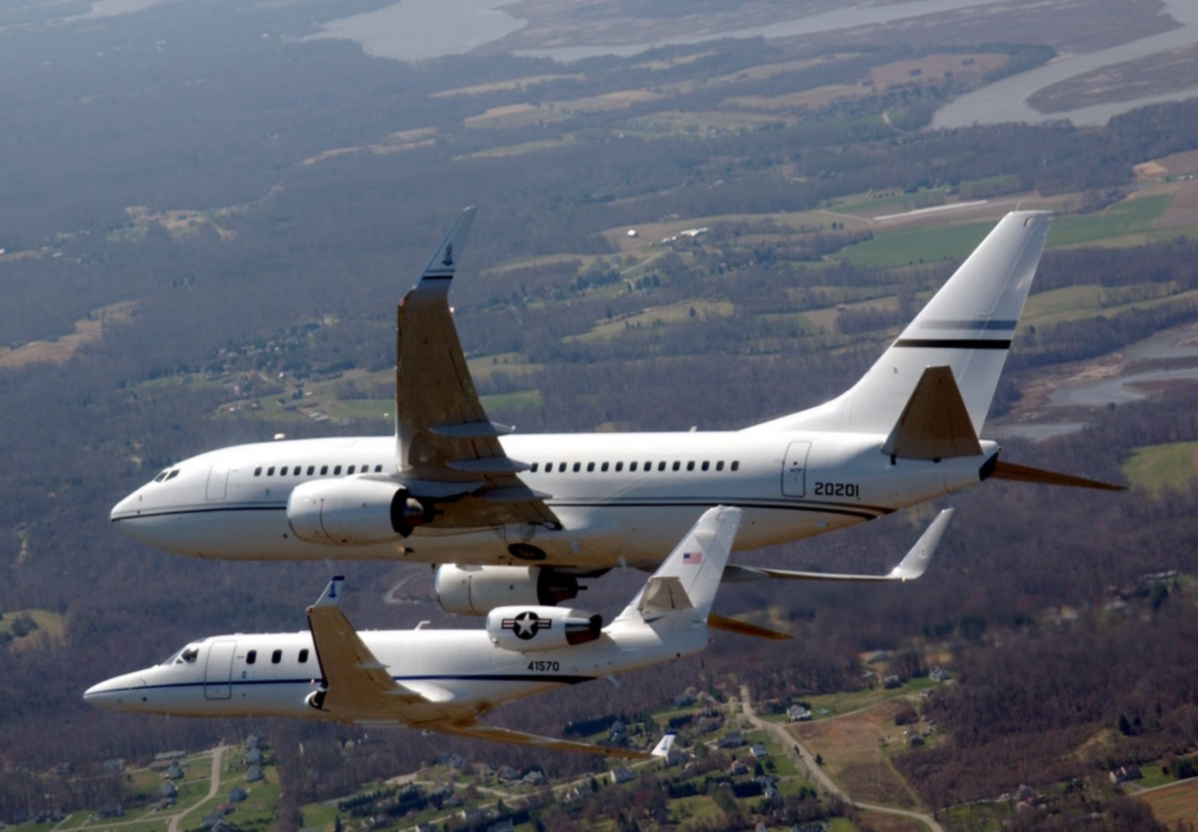
- 201st C-38A and C-40C in flight.
- Active: 20 June 1992–present
- Country: United States
- Allegiance: District of Columbia
- Branch: United States Air Force
- Type: Squadron
- Role: Airlift
- Part of: District of Columbia Air National Guard
- Garrison/HQ: Joint Base Andrews, Maryland
- Nickname: "Hoku"
- Mottos: "Capital Guardians: Proven, Vigilant...Ready!"

Insignia
- 201st Airlift Squadron emblem

The 201st Airlift Squadron flies Boeing C-40 Clipper. It is a unit of the District of Columbia Air National Guard. Its parent unit is the 113th Wing.

== Mission ==
The 201st Airlift Squadron provides short notice worldwide transportation for the Executive Branch, Congressional Members, Department of Defense officials and high-ranking U.S. and foreign dignitaries using the C-40C aircraft.

== History ==
The background of the 201st Airlift Squadron mission began in 1946 with the activation of H Flight, HQ, District of Columbia National Guard. Operating out of Hangar 15 on the East side of Andrews Air Force Base, H Flight's assortment of Douglas B-26 Invader, Douglas C-47 Skytrain, Douglas C-53 Skytrooper and North American P-51 Mustang aircraft provided passenger airlift capabilities to the National Guard.

In 1954 H Flight was replaced by Detachment 1, Headquarters, District of Columbia Air National Guard. Over the next 38 years Detachment 1 employed more than 20 different types of aircraft to provide worldwide airlift support for both military and civilian passengers. Detachment 1 provided airlift support for large military teams as well as small command groups. The detachment also provided transportation for distinguished passengers such as the vice president, congressional and cabinet members, service secretaries and local civic leaders. In 1984, Detachment 1 relocated to its current location on the West side of Andrews Air Force Base.

On 20 June 1992, Detachment 1 was discontinued and replaced by the 201st Airlift Squadron. Today the 201st continues to carry on the work that was started with H Flight in 1946. The continuing efforts to upgrade and expand the squadron's worldwide capabilities led to the acquisition of Gulfstream C-38A Couriers in 1998 and Boeing C-40 Clippers (Boeing 737) in 2002. The 201st retired its C-38A fleet in 2015, transferring the aircraft to the United States Navy.

The events of 11 September 2001 marked a turning point in the history of the squadron. The Global War on Terrorism brought a new emphasis on worldwide VIP travel. Since that date, the 201st Airlift Squadron's operational tempo has increased dramatically, with the majority of missions overseas. With its current complement of C-40Cs, the squadron provides worldwide air transportation for the executive branch, congressional members, Department of Defense and high-ranking U.S. and foreign dignitaries.

== Lineage ==
- Constituted as the 201st Airlift Squadron on 16 March 1992 and allotted to the Air National Guard

Activated on 20 June 1992

=== Assignments ===
- 113th Wing, 20 June 1992
- 113th Operations Group, 1 January 1993 – present

=== Mobilization gaining command ===
- Air Mobility Command, 1992 – present)

=== Stations ===
- Andrews Air Force Base (later Joint Base Andrews), 20 June 1992 – present

=== Aircraft ===
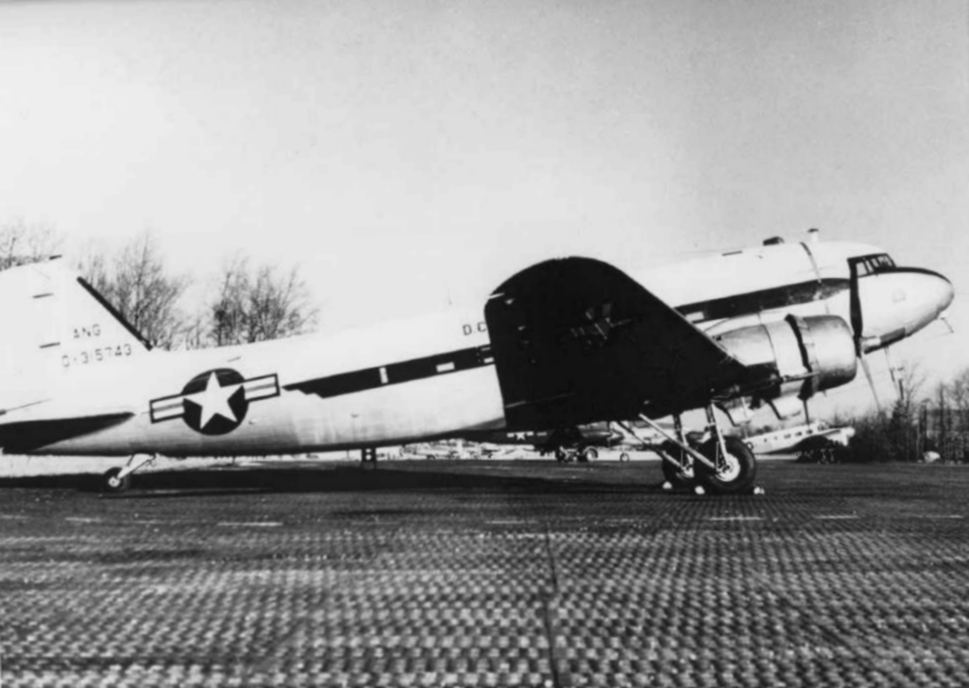
The C-47A was flown from 1951 to 1967.

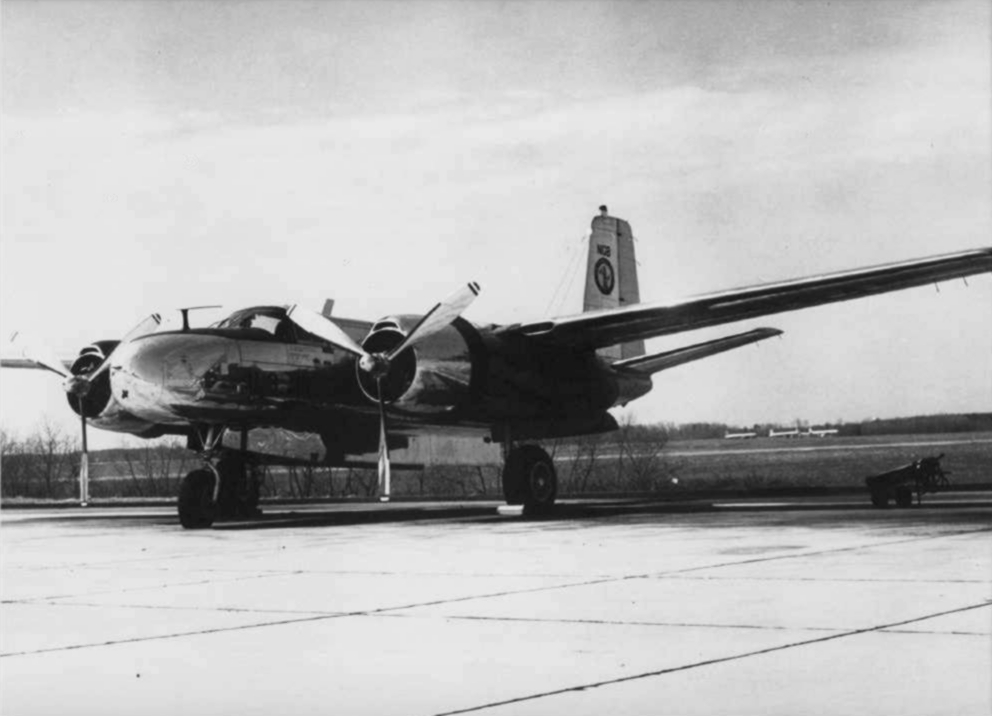
A B-26, flown 1951 to 1972.

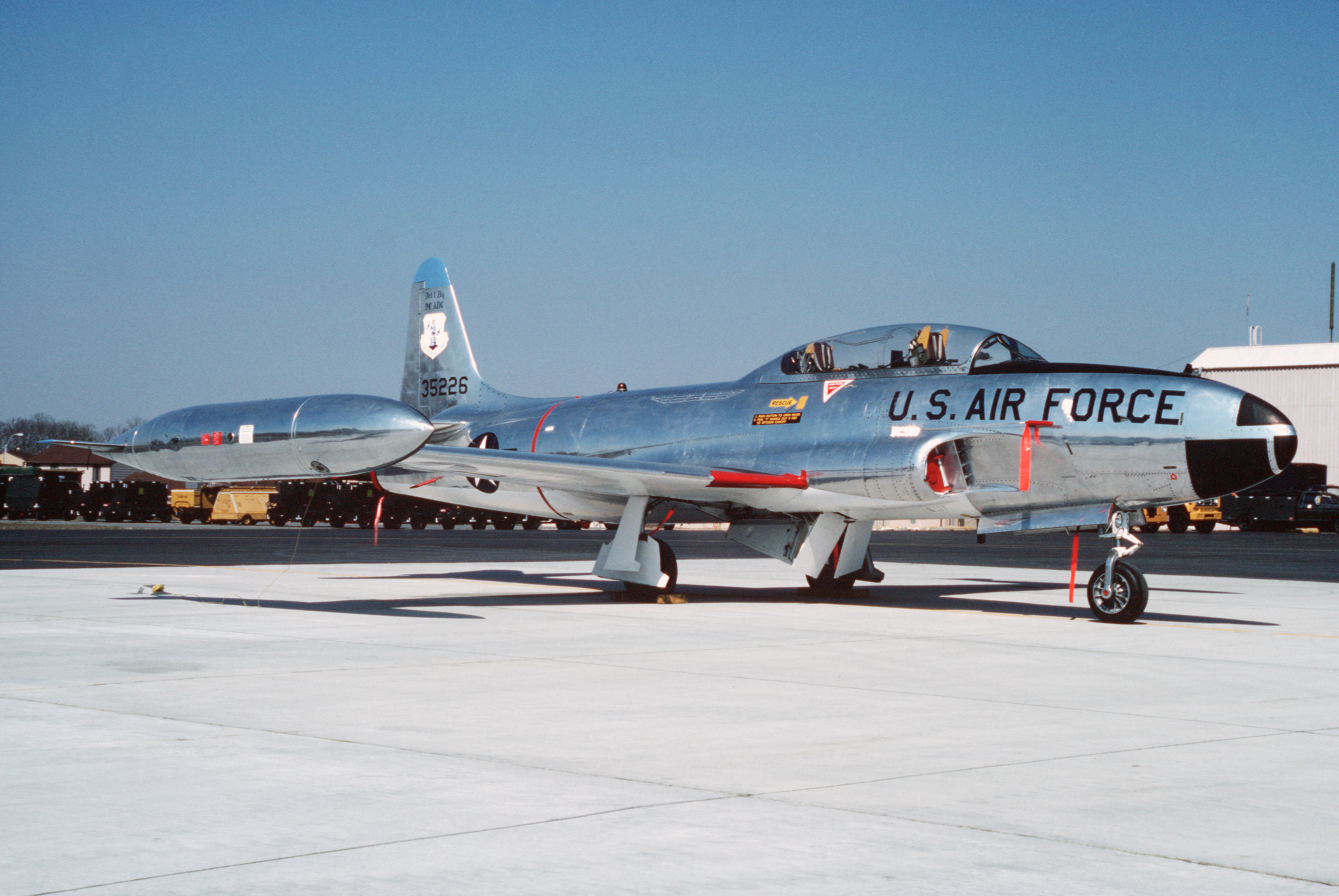
The T-33A was flown until 1987.

- Douglas C-47 Skytrain 1946-1967
- Douglas B-26 Invader 1946-1972
- Douglas C-53 Skytrooper 1946-1958
- North American P-51 Mustang 1954
- North American F-86 Sabre 1954-1957
- Beech C-45 Expeditor 1954-1960
- Lockheed T-33 1954-1987
- Cessna LC-126 1955-1956
- Beechcraft L-23 Seminole 1955-1962 reclassified as U-8 (1963)
- De Havilland Canada L-20 Beaver 1957
- Convair T-29 1958-1975
- Hiller H-23 Raven 1960-1963
- Douglas C-54 Skymaster 1965-1967
- Cessna U-3A 1969-1972
- Lockheed C-121 Constellation 1969-1972
- Cessna O-2B Skymaster 1974
- Convair C-131 Samaritan 1975-1978
- Boeing T-43A 1978-1985
- North American T-39 Sabreliner 1981-1987
- Boeing C-22B 1986-2004
- Learjet C-21A 1987-1998
- Gulfstream C-38A Courier 1998–2015
- Boeing C-40C Clipper 2004–Present

== Bibliography ==
- 201st Airlift Squadrons Historical Archives, Menoher Drive, Andrews AFB MD.
