= People's Peace Treaty =

The People's Peace Treaty was developed in December 1970 by representatives of United States and Vietnamese student organizations. The treaty was part of a collaborative effort to end the Vietnam War by outlining a number of principles on which all sides could agree. The treaty was endorsed by politicians and media personalities, including Eugene J. McCarthy, Daniel Berrigan, Phillip Berrigan, Noam Chomsky, Charles E. Goodell, I. F. Stone, George Wald, Erich Segal and Rock Hudson.

== Text ==
Be it known that the American and Vietnamese peoples are not enemies. The war is carried out in the names of the people of the United States and South Vietnam but without our consent. It destroys the land and people of Vietnam. It drains America of its resources, its youth and its honor.

We hereby agree to end the war on the following terms, so that both peoples can live under the joy of independence and can devote themselves to building a society based on human equality and respect for the earth. In rejecting the war we also reject all forms of racism and discrimination against people based on color, class, sex, national origin, and ethnic grouping which form the basis of the war policies, past and present, of the United States government.

1. The Americans agree to the immediate and total withdrawal of all U.S. forces from Vietnam.
2. The Vietnamese pledge that, as soon as the U.S. government publicly sets a date for total withdrawal, they will enter discussions to secure the release of all American prisoners, including pilots captured while bombing North Vietnam.
3. There will be an immediate cease-fire between U.S. forces and those led by the Provisional Revolutionary Government of South Vietnam.
4. They will enter discussions on the procedures to guarantee the safety of all withdrawing troops.
5. The Americans pledge to end the imposition of Thieu-Ky-Khiem on the people of South Vietnam in order to insure their right to self-determination and so that all political prisoners can be released.
6. The Vietnamese pledge to form a provisional coalition government to organize democratic elections. All parties agree to respect the results of elections in which all South Vietnamese can participate freely without the presence of any foreign troops.
7. The South Vietnamese pledge to enter discussions of procedures to guarantee the safety and political freedom of those South Vietnamese who have collaborated with the U.S. or with the U.S.-supported regime.
8. The Americans and Vietnamese agree to respect the independence, peace and neutrality of Laos and Cambodia in accord with the 1954 and 1962 Geneva conventions, and not to interfere in the internal affairs of these two countries.
9. Upon these points of agreement, we pledge to end the war and resolve all other questions in the spirit of self-determination and mutual respect for the independence and political freedom of the people of Vietnam and the United States.

By ratifying this agreement, we pledge to take whatever actions are appropriate to implement the terms of this Joint Treaty of Peace, and to insure its acceptance by the government of the United States.

South Vietnam National Student Union
South Vietnam Liberation Student Union
North Vietnam Student Union
National Student Association

Saigon, Hanoi and Paris, December 1970

Signed:

Adopted by New University Conference and Chicago Movement Meeting, January 8–10, 1971
