= JCRC =

JCRC may refer to:

- Jewish Community Relations Council, a local or regional council in the United States
- Joint Casualty Resolution Center, a US joint-service military organisation to locate US personnel Missing in action in the Vietnam War
- Joint Clinical Research Centre, an HIV/AIDS research institution in Uganda
- Japan Contents Review Center, a Japanese video and game self-censorship organization
- Japan Casino Regulatory Commission, a Japanese government agency that regulates casinos
