= William W. Bedsworth =

American judge

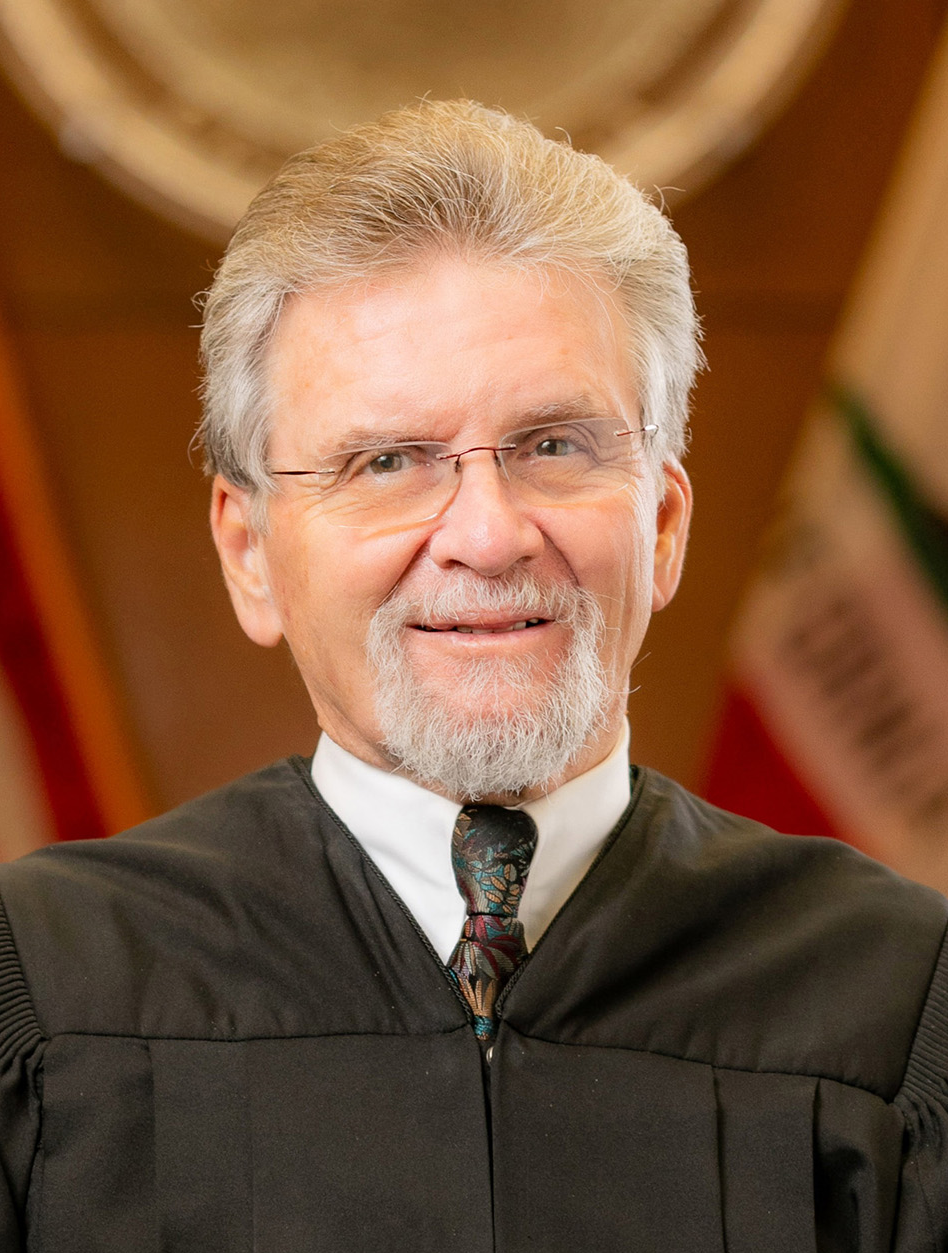
- Born: November 21, 1947 (age 78)
- Education: Loyola Marymount University; University of California, Berkeley
- Known for: Former Associate Justice of the California Court of Appeal

William W. Bedsworth (born November 21, 1947, in Long Beach, California) was an Associate Justice of the California Court of Appeal from 1997-2024.

== Background ==
Justice Bedsworth grew up in Gardena, California. He lives in Laguna Beach and is married to Kelly. He also has two daughters, a son, and five grandchildren. He graduated with a Bachelor of Arts Degree (cum laude) from Loyola Marymount University in 1968 and earned his Juris Doctor at the University of California, Berkeley (Boalt Hall School of Law) in 1971. He was admitted to the State Bar of California in January 1972.

== Legal career ==
Bedsworth worked as a prosecutor in the Orange County District Attorney's Office (line deputy, felony trial deputy, appellate attorney, and managing attorney) as an Orange County deputy district attorney from 1972 to 1987. He handled cases in the California and United States Supreme Courts. He twice was elected both President of the Association of Orange County Deputy District Attorneys and as a Director of the Board of the Orange County Bar Association.

In 1986, he won election to an Orange County Superior Court seat; he was re-elected in 1992 and February 1997 (he was Orange County Superior Court judge, 1987–1997). He was assigned by California Supreme Court as temporary appellate justice from April to December 1994.

On February 25, 1997, Governor Pete Wilson appointed him an associate justice of the California Court of Appeal for the Fourth District, Division 3 in Santa Ana, and he was elected to serve in that position in 1998, 2010, and 2022. During that time he was named the Franklin G. West Award winner (the highest award given by the Orange County Bar), and the California chapter of the American Board of Trial Advocates named their only judicial award after him. He was known for his LGBTQ+ rights opinion in 2000, and his opinions on civility deemed by a colleague to represent "The Holy Trinity of Civility Law."

He indicated that he would retire from the bench in November 2024, at age 77, after a 54-year legal career. As he leaves, he will collect a Distinguished Service Award, the highest recognition for a California state court judge, recently announced by the Judicial Council. In the event, he officially retired on October 22, 2024.

== Academic activities and publications ==
Bedsworth was a member of the adjunct faculty of Western State University College of Law, Chapman University School of Law, the California Judicial College in Berkeley, and the Board of Advisors of Whittier Law School. Bedsworth is a current member of the adjunct faculty of University of California, Irvine School of Law.

He has published law review articles and in lay magazines. He has long written a column entitled, "A Criminal Waste of Space," and recently published his second book, "A Criminal Waste of Time" (American Lawyer Media Publications). He writes regularly for the Orange County Lawyer magazine. The California Newspaper Publishers' Association named Bedsworth's "A Criminal Waste of Space" the best newspaper column in California in 2019.

== Other activities ==
- Director on the Board of National Conference of Christians and Jews and Fair Share 502
- Hispanic Bar Association Judge of the Year in 1997
- Goal judge National Hockey League for Anaheim Ducks home games and some road playoff games; became the subject of a story in ESPN The Magazine entitled "Justice of the Crease"

== See also ==
- Supreme Court of California
- California Court of Appeal
