= Whittier Law School =

Former law school of Whittier College

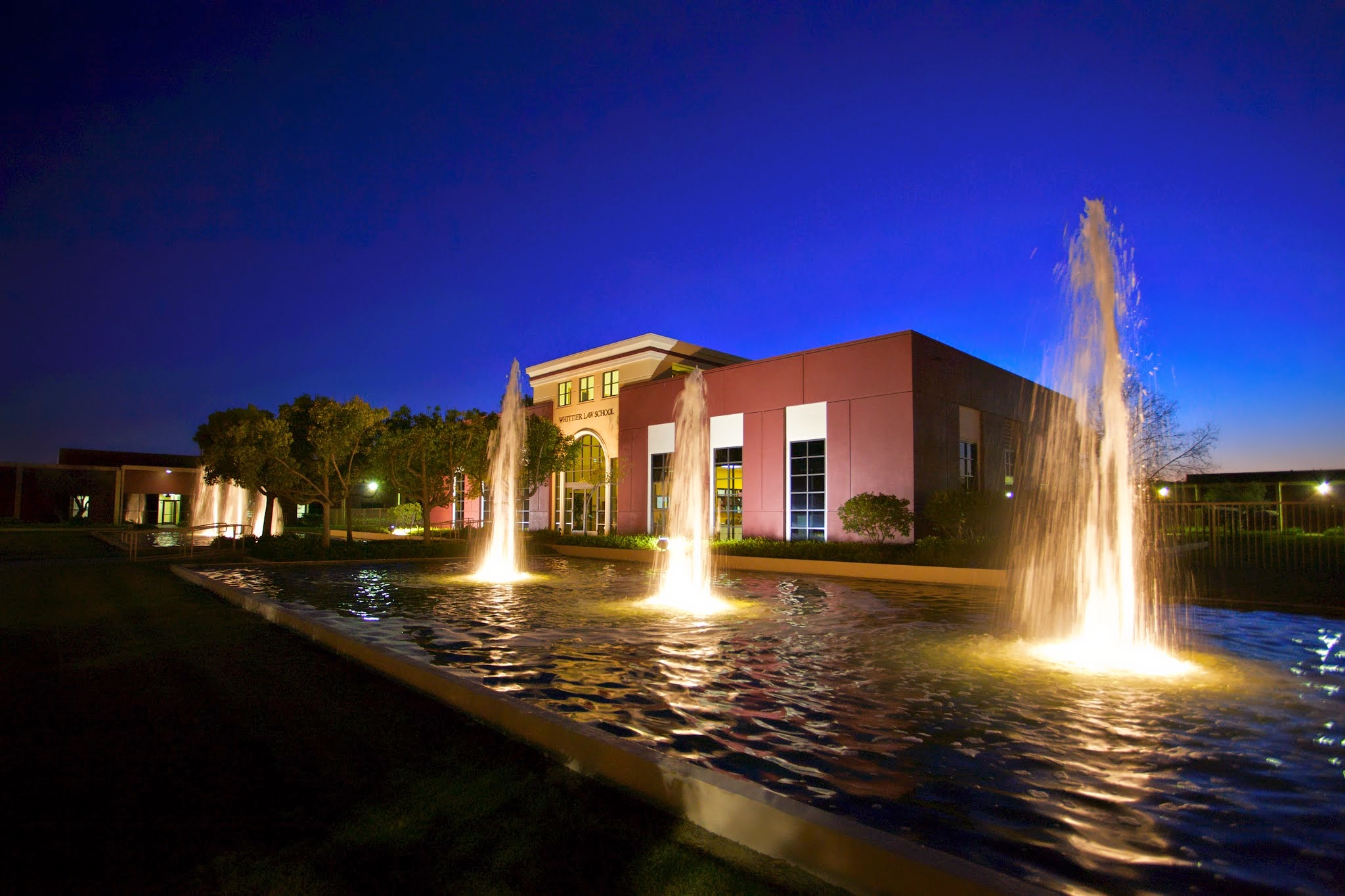
- Whittier Law School's Building 1 (of 4), housing Academic and Bar Support, the Dean's Office, and Student/Alumni Relations
- Parent school: Whittier College
- Established: 1966 (2020, ceased operations)
- School type: Private
- Dean: Judith Daar (interim); Rudolph C. Hasl (interim)
- Location: Costa Mesa, California, United States
- USNWR ranking: (defunct)
- Bar pass rate: 11% (July 2019 first-time takers)
- ABA profile: LSAC link: Whittier Law School

Whittier Law School was a law school in Costa Mesa, California, founded in 1966. The law school was part of Whittier College, a private institution. After several years being ranked among the poorest-performing law schools in the United States based on bar passage rate and job placement, Whittier Law School announced in April 2017 that it would no longer be admitting students and would discontinue its legal program, becoming the first law school with full accreditation by the American Bar Association (ABA) to shut down in at least 30 years. Since the school's closure, transcript requests are now handled by Whittier College.

== History ==
The school was founded as the Beverly College of Law in 1966, and was originally located in the Hancock Park area of Los Angeles' Westside. It was a private, nonprofit educational institution intended to meet the growing need for a law school in the Los Angeles metropolitan area.

In 1974, the Whittier College Board of Trustees voted to merge the Beverly College of Law into Whittier College. In 1975, the Law School became known as the Whittier College School of Law and later as Whittier Law School. In response to a significant gift to the Law School, the Hancock Park building was dedicated as the Ross McCollum Law Center during a ceremony at which Supreme Court Associate Justice Byron R. White presented the major address.

During the 1990s, the Law School, along with leaders at Whittier College, decided to relocate the campus to Orange County in order to satisfy space needs and in response to requests by the community for an ABA law school in Orange County. In 1996, the college acquired the present 14-acre campus in Costa Mesa, remodeled the buildings on the site to accommodate the needs of the Law School, and moved the faculty and students over a period of three years. In 1997, the move was completed and Supreme Court Associate Justice Anthony Kennedy gave the major address at the opening ceremony.

In 2013, Chief Justice of California Tani Cantil-Sakauye spoke at the grand opening of the law school's 4,400 square feet (410 m^{2}) court room. A substantial amount of the funds to build the new $2 million facility was donated by Paul Kiesel, a Whittier alumnus and partner at Kiesel Law, LLP. Over 150 contributors, including alumni, faculty, judges, law firms, members of the Orange County community, and Whittier Law School student groups, were responsible for the remainder.

In April 2017, the school announced that it would admit no more first-year students and would work with the 400 current students to complete their degree. It became the first fully accredited law school in the country to announce closure in a time of challenge for legal education institutions. The school ceased all operations in July 2020.

== Academics ==
Whittier Law School offered both full and part-time J.D. programs. The full-time program took three years to complete, while the part-time program took four years to complete.

=== Accreditation ===
In 1978, the American Bar Association (ABA) granted Whittier Law School provisional accreditation. In 1985, Whittier Law School was fully accredited by the ABA and in 1987 it became a member of the Association of American Law Schools (AALS).

On August 9, 2005, the ABA, concerned about Whittier Law School's low bar passage rates, placed the law school's accreditation on probationary status for two years. On August 10, 2007, the ABA extended the probation until February 15, 2009. Under the ABA's rules, the law school remained fully accredited during the probation period, and all students who entered and graduated during this period are deemed to have graduated from an ABA accredited law school.

On April 17, 2008, the ABA Accreditation Committee recommended to the Council of the Section of Legal Education and Admissions to the Bar that Whittier Law School be removed from probation. Dean Cogan reported:

The Law School requested this action on February 14, 2008, because the bar passage rates of our graduates for the five-year period, 2003-07, show compliance with the ABA bar passage rule, Interpretation 301-6. We fully expect that the Council will accept the Committee's recommendation at its meeting on June 6 and remove the Law School from its probationary status.

On June 7, 2008, the ABA officially removed Whittier Law School from its probationary status.

According to the ABA Section on Legal Education & Admissions to the Bar, Section 301-6(a)(1)(b) states that graduating law students within the last five calendar years must pass a state bar examination at a minimum of 75% in at least three of the five calendar years.

== Bar passage rates ==
Whittier Law School hired a new Director of Academic Services to begin in the 2011-2012 academic year. Subsequently, the law school had the lowest bar exam pass rate of all California ABA-accredited law schools for first-time takers for the July 2016 exam at 22%; for first-time takers for the July 2015 exam at 38%; for first-time takers for the February 2015 exam at 30%; and for first-time takers for the July 2014 exam at 43%.

	Whittier Law	All CA ABA accredited, first-timers
July 2019	11%	71%
July 2018	26%	64%
July 2017	n/a	70%
July 2016	22%	62%
July 2015	38%	68.2%
July 2014	43%	69.4%
July 2013	64.7%	75.9%
July 2012	70%	67.3%
July 2011	56%	76%
July 2010	53%	75%
July 2009	62%	71%

=== Rankings ===
In 2010, The Princeton Review featured Whittier Law School in its 2011 edition of "The 172 Best Law Schools", highlighting the school's emphasis on small class sizes, an active student body, and practical externship opportunities in intellectual property, criminal, family, business law. In January 2011, Whitter scored a "B−" among "Best Public Interest Law Schools" listing by The National Jurist: The Magazine for Law Students.

On March 22, 2012 U.S. News & World Report included Whittier Law School in its list of "10 Law Schools That Lead to the Most Debt".

In 2015, Whittier was recognized by U.S. News & World Report as the country's fourth most ethnically diverse law school. The website reported that 23% of Whittier students were Hispanic, the school's largest minority. The Council on Legal Education Opportunity (CLEO) selected Whittier to host two seminars for students from diverse backgrounds over the weekend of June 27–28, 2015. The program's stated goal was "to prepare talented, motivated, yet underrepresented students with guidance in becoming successful law students." On November 14, 2015, the law school planned to host a day-long law school assessment conference, called "Building an Assessment Plan from the Ground Up," designed to help law schools comply with the assessment requirements recently added by the American Bar Association for accreditation.

=== Admission statistics ===
Whittier Law School's campus in Costa Mesa, California

For the Class of 2013:

- Number of applications: 2,165
- Number of students enrolled: 303
- Number of non-white students: 134
- Median range of LSAT: 150-154
- Median range of GPA: 2.75-3.28
- Median age: 27

For the Class of 2016:

- Number of applications: 1,579
- Number of students Enrolled: 221
- Number of non-white students: 116
- Median range of LSAT: 145-152
- Median range of GPA: 2.61-3.26
- Median age: 25

=== Graduation rates ===
Class of 2013

- Full-time: 67.97%

(256 students matriculated in 2010; 174 students graduated in 2013)

- Part-time: 49.18%

(61 students matriculated in 2009; 30 students graduated in 2013)

=== Tuition ===
The full-time tuition for the 2014–2015 school year was $42,400.

=== Debt ===
In a 2012 article, the average debt of Whittier Law School graduates was $138,961. Average debt was $154,267 for 2013 grads. For 2011 it was the 11th highest of 201 ABA accredited law schools. Of 2013 grads who were employed (approximately half were unemployed), nine months after graduation they had a median starting salary of $62,400. In 2017, it was reported that in the previous year graduates "had an average of $179,000 in pre-interest debt, the second-highest total among all law schools in the country", citing Law School Transparency.

== Publications ==
Whittier Law School had two scholarly publications: the Whittier Law Review and the Whittier Journal of Child and Family Advocacy, and one student-run newspaper, the Zealous Advocate.

According to a ranking conducted by the Washington & Lee Law School, the Whittier Law Review was ranked 109th out of 192 law reviews evaluated. According to a ranking of law reviews on the basis of the prominence of the lead article authors, conducted in 2007 by two professors at the Shepard Broad Law Center, the Whittier Law Review was ranked 121st out of 171 law reviews evaluated. The Law Review was a student-run organization publishing a collection of articles of legal scholarship four times annually.

== Programs ==
Whittier Law School had centers in children's rights, intellectual property law, and international and comparative law. These centers hosted fellows, offered externships, and sponsored symposia and workshops. The law school also offered concentrations in criminal law, business law, and environmental law for students who wished to take additional, specialized courses in those areas.

Whittier Law School offered students the opportunity to study abroad. For summer 2015, the law school offered summer programs accredited by the American Bar Association (ABA) in China, Israel, and Spain.

Whittier Law School regularly hosted symposiums and expert panels for academic discussion of contemporary issues. In September 2014, in conjunction with Orange County Coastkeeper, the school hosted an all-day symposium with a continuing-education component, called "Our Coast To Keep: Environmental Law Enforcement in Southern California." In April 2015, the school hosted a symposium on assisted reproductive technology.

== Costs ==
The total cost of attendance (indicating the cost of tuition, fees, and living expenses) at Whittier Law School for the 2013–2014 academic year was $72,780. The Law School Transparency estimated debt-financed cost of attendance for three years is $261,501.

== Employment status ==
=== Legal employment prospects of matriculating students ===
According to Whittier's consumer information page and class of 2013 employment status as reported to the ABA, of the 317 entering students only 210 students graduated and were awarded a degree by Whittier. Of the entering Class of 2013 (matriculated in 2010 as full-time and 2009 as part-time) only 64.3% graduated with a degree from Whittier; however, excluding transfers (29 students transferred), 72.9% of the entering class graduated from Whittier. Otherwise, of the 2013 Class, 46 students were academically disqualified involuntarily and 13 voluntarily withdrew.

Accordingly, for the 2013 class, excluding transfers of 29 students, only 210 of 288 students graduated, meaning the employment rate in full-time long term jobs requiring bar passage (e.g. attorney) who were practicing law nine months after graduation of the 2013 entering class was only 19.44%. Disregarding transfers, of the Class of 2013, approximately only one out of five students who entered Whittier graduated and became a lawyer in a full-time long term position within nine months of graduation.

=== Employment status of graduates ===
ABA employment summary for 2013 graduates
Employment status	Percentage
Employed - bar passage required	32.86%
Employed - J.D. advantage	8.57%
Employed - professional position	12.38%
Employed - non-professional position	1.43%
Employed - undeterminable	0.48%
Pursuing graduate degree full time	0.95%
Unemployed - start date deferred	0.0%
Unemployed - not seeking	0.48%
Unemployed - seeking	40.48%
Employment status unknown	2.38%
Total of 210 graduates

In 2015, National Jurist magazine ranked Whittier Law School 12th in the nation for improved employment. Graduates with full-time jobs increased 13.8% from the Class of 2013 to the Class of 2014. Of the jobs as lawyers, 23.9% reported working in law firms, 1.9% in government, and 0.4% in both federal clerkship and public interest. Of graduates, 85 students (40.9%) reported themselves as "unemployed-seeking" nine months after graduation. The same number, 85 students of the 2013 graduating class, did not pass the California bar exam. Of those in the Class of 2013 who graduated, passed the bar, and became licensed (126 students), 69 (54.7%) were practicing law nine months after graduation and only 54 (44.8%) were able to find full-time long term employment as lawyers (two reported full-time and short-term). No one reported being a solo practitioner. Within the 2013 graduating class not "bar passage required" (practicing law as an attorney) or "JD advantage" type of job, 30 were employed "professionally" or in a "non-professional" position nine months after graduation. The same number of students also graduated from the part-time program.

In 2015, National Jurist magazine ranked Whittier Law School 12th in the nation for improved employment. The school's employed increased 13.8% from the Class of 2013 to the Class of 2014.

In 2015 Whittier co-launched a program with the Legal Aid Society of Orange County, whereby a limited number of graduates who committed to perform at least 300 hours of free legal service had access to subsidized office space in the Legal Aid Society's office. The program included training in marketing, managing office overhead and tax risks. The majority of the funding for the 2014-2015 class came from a grant obtained by the legal aid society. Martin Pritikin, Whittier's associate dean, said, "Law schools need to view themselves as having responsibility to their students even after they graduate to help them transition."

== Notable people ==
=== Faculty ===
- Raphael Lapin, adjunct professor, author, and founder of Lapin Negotiation Strategies
- I. Nelson Rose, full professor with tenure, author of Gambling and the Law

=== Alumni ===
==== Judges ====
- Florence-Marie Cooper (1975): Judge, United States District Court for the Central District of California
- Roosevelt F. Dorn (1969): Judge, Los Angeles County Superior Court
- Mablean Ephriam (1978): host, Divorce Court
- Cristina Pérez (1994): Judge, Cristina's Court, La Corte del Pueblo, La Corte de Familia, Justice for All with Judge Cristina Perez

==== Other appointments and vocations ====
- Carol Ann Abrams: television and film producer; graduated first in her class at Whittier
- Chuck Essegian: Former major league baseball player
- Bryan Glazer: Co-Chairman and co-owner of the Tampa Bay Buccaneers; Director (retired) of the Harbinger Group
- Bill Handel (1979): morning drive talk show host on KFI-AM in Los Angeles
- Paul D. Irving: Former Sergeant at Arms of the United States House of Representatives
- Christine N. Jones (1997): candidate, Arizona gubernatorial election, 2014, former Executive Vice President, General Counsel, and Corporate Secretary of Go Daddy
- Nick Khan: Former talent agent and current president of WWE
- Debra Opri: celebrity attorney
- Diane Tebelius (1979): Chairman of the Washington State Republican Party (2006–2007); candidate, Washington's 8th congressional district, 2004

== See also ==
- List of defunct law schools in the United States
