= Joint Combined Exchange Training =

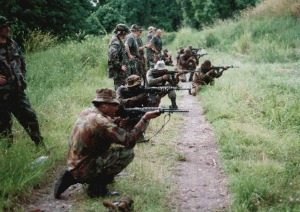
Forces from the Solomon Islands receive instruction on the FN FAL rifle from American Special Forces

Joint Combined Exchange Training or JCET programs are exercises designed to provide training opportunities for American Special Operations Forces by holding the training exercises in countries that the forces may one day have to operate in, as well as providing training opportunities for the armed forces of the host countries. Typically, each JCET program involved 10–40 American special operations forces personnel, though the number can sometimes be as high as 100. The United States Congress permitted the use of funds from the military budget to be used in overseas training such as JCETs in 1991, providing that the Secretary of Defense submits to Congress annually a report on overseas training activities.

Begun in the 1970s, JCET programs were expanded in 1988 to Belgium, Denmark, West Germany and Italy. A Pentagon report from 1997, the year of a JCET in Equatorial Guinea, stated that a JCET program "involves small deployments of special operations personnel—sometimes fewer than a dozen troops—that conduct exercises jointly with foreign security forces to train the participants in a variety of areas that 'sharpen critical SOF mission essential task list... skills and enhance host-nation skills." In 1997, there were 101 JCET programs operating worldwide, with 95 operating in 1998.

From 30 May to 30 June 2006, a JCET program was conducted by the U.S. military involving Albania, Croatia, and Macedonia. The course involved classes on "leadership and planning, rifle marksmanship and drilling techniques, close quarter battle and military operations in urban environments, small unit tactics, basic individual troop-leading procedures, and collective war fighting skills", with over 100 American personnel taking part.

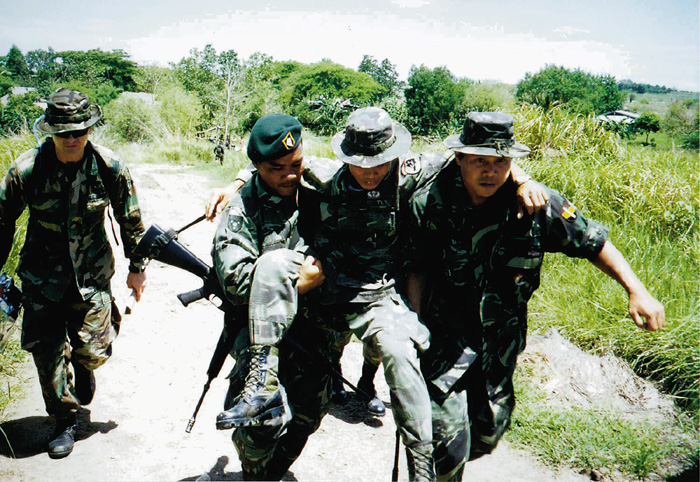
American Special Forces training soldiers from The Philippines.

== Exercise Flintlock ==
September 1968 marked the beginning of a long and successful FLINTLOCK exercise series. Joint/Combined Exercise FLINTLOCK I was conducted in the fall of 1968 and consisted of four sub-exercises located in West Germany, Greece, Spain, and Denmark. The 7th Special Operations Squadron was involved in the exercise.

In 1981, Exercise Flintlock was held in the United Kingdom. Elements of the 231st Combat Communications Squadron (DC ANG) took part in the exercise. On 26 April 1982, during the Flintlock 82 exercise, Sergeant First Class Clifford Strickland was picked up by a Lockheed MC-130 Combat Talon of the 7th Special Operations Squadron at CFB Lahr, Germany, using the Fulton surface-to-air recovery system. However, he fell to his death reportedly due to faulty equipment in 1400 hrs accident. This was the last ever attempt to utilize the Skyhook system in a live pick-up.

Elements of the 1st Special Forces Group, 3rd Special Forces Group or 5th Special Forces Group conduct JCET programs twice a year in Africa. Designed to give the special forces experience of fighting on the continent, these JCET programs are known as Flintlocks and vary from search and rescue exercises, disaster management, or combat life saving. The funding for these programs is provided by the Department of Defense, with the locale being decided by Special Operations Command. Flintlock exercises provide an integral part of a Special Forces groups' annual training program. The program is designed to increase the strength of the host nation. The SFODA will provide over 60% of the training and usually receive 40% back in country specific training.

In March/April 1999, Naval Regional Contracting Detachment Naples (NRCD Naples) deployed contingency contracting officers in support of EXERCISE FLINTLOCK IIA in Côte d'Ivoire. This exercise, conducted by the U.S. Army's 96th Civil Affairs Battalion, included road, cafeteria and latrine construction projects, well-drilling requirements and numerous inoculations for various tropical diseases. NRCC contracting officers awarded contracts for these projects valued at $63,000. The 2003 Flintlock, held in South Africa, had a total cost of $80,000.

Flintlock 2005 ran from June 6 until June 26, having been planned since 2004 in North and West Africa, specifically Algeria, Senegal, Mauritania, Mali, Niger and Chad, with forces from Europe, the United States and the North Atlantic Treaty Organization (NATO) taking part. The primary aim of the training operation was to increase the capability of African forces to halt the trade in illicit weaponry, anti-terrorism, illegal goods and human trafficking, improving command, control and communications, marksmanship, medical skills and human rights knowledge.

The U.S. Air Force's first operational deployment of the V-22 Osprey sent four CV-22s to Mali in November 2008 for Exercise Flintlock. The CV-22s flew nonstop from Hurlburt Field, Florida with in-flight refueling.

== Controversy ==
There is concern, however, that forces trained by American Special Forces go on to use their new skills to commit war crimes in their home countries and would pose a threat to the stability of the regions. The Leahy Amendment requires that all foreign troops trained by the US military be pre-screened by the US State Department for history of human rights violations allegations. Failure to pass this screening results in the foreign troops or their entire units being excluded from participating in the training. Furthermore, the Leahy Amendment requires that part of the military instruction that US military troops provide to any foreign soldier or unit includes training in human rights and the Law of Armed Conflict. US soldiers that provide training to foreign troops are required by the Leahy Amendment to report any evidence of human rights abuses.

There is concern that, as one of the directives of the 1998 Special Operations Forces Posture Statement indicates, the JCETs encourage the training of paramilitary forces to help combat lawlessness and insurgency, these forces could destabilise the local governments. One report on the subject states that "Militaries strengthened by the United States could end up toppling the very democratic governments that American policy makers want to keep in power."

Particular scrutiny has been leveled at JCETs in Colombia and Indonesia (East Timor especially), the latter in particular as there exists a ban on all other military assistance to the region, and JCETs are the only permitted contact between US and indigenous forces as all other training programs are not permitted on order of the United States House of Representatives.

There are also concerns about full disclosure of JCET activities to the U.S. Government from the armed forces, as the current reports to Congress (known as the Section 2011 report) are not required to mention JCET programs relating to counter-narcotic or anti-terrorism activities, however these form a large part of the worldwide JCET program, particularly in Latin America. There are also concerns that the report is incomplete due to problems with the definition of Joint Combined Exchange Training programs.
