= William J. Walker =

United States army general

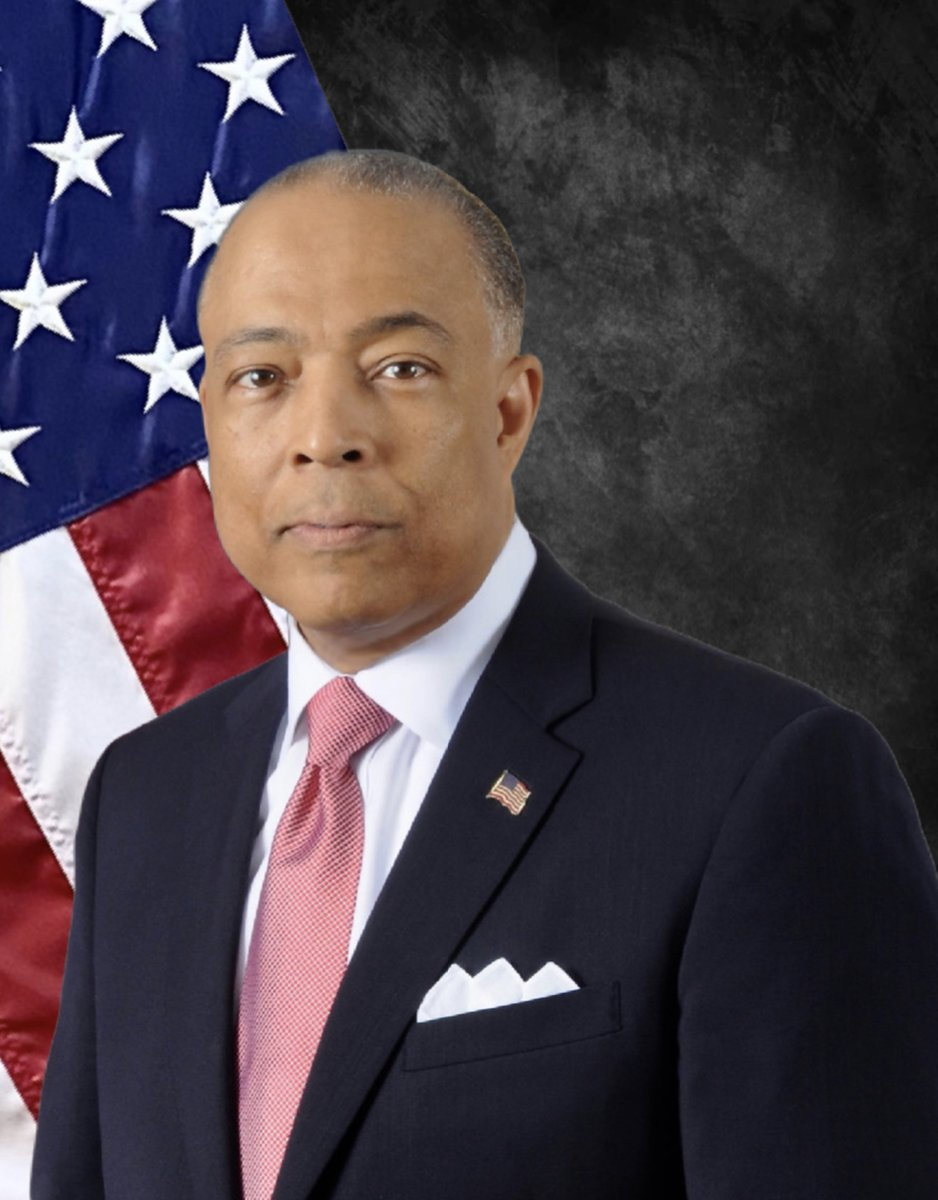

37th Sergeant at Arms of the United States House of Representatives
- In office April 26, 2021 – January 7, 2023
- Leader: Nancy Pelosi
- Preceded by: Timothy Blodgett (acting)
- Succeeded by: William McFarland

Personal details
- Born: Chicago, Illinois, U.S.

Military service
- Allegiance: United States
- Branch/service: United States Army
- Years of service: 1981–2021
- Rank: Major General
- Commands: District of Columbia National Guard; DCNG Land Component Command; Joint Task Force-District of Columbia; Multi-Agency Augmentation Command; U.S. Army South, Partnership for the Americas, Brigade Joint Task Force; Company A, 260th Military Intelligence Battalion
- Battles/wars: War in Afghanistan

William J. Walker is a retired United States Army major general and former Sergeant at Arms of the U.S. House of Representatives. He was the 38th House Sergeant at Arms and the first African-American to hold the office. He last served as the 23rd Commanding General of the District of Columbia National Guard. This responsibility includes command of the District of Columbia Army and Air National Guard units. Walker previously served in the Drug Enforcement Administration as a Special Agent and was promoted to the Senior Executive Service in January 2003, with his final assignment being Deputy Assistant Administrator in Charge of the Office of Strategic Warning Intelligence. Walker is a member of the Council on Foreign Relations and a National Academy of Public Administration Fellow.

In March 2021, House Speaker Nancy Pelosi announced her intention to appoint Walker as Sergeant at Arms of the United States House of Representatives. He was sworn in on April 26, 2021. In January 2023 when Kevin McCarthy became Speaker, Walker was directed to resign in order for McCarthy to make his own permanent choice for SAA following a nationwide search. The office is currently run by the incumbent William McFarland.

== Education ==
Walker is a native of Chicago, Illinois, where he was born and raised. Walker attended St. Sabina private Catholic grammar school as a youth and graduated from Leo Catholic High School in 1975. Walker attended the University of Illinois at Chicago where he earned a bachelor of arts degree. He then attended Chicago State University, where he earned his master of science degree in Criminal Justice and Corrections. In addition, Walker holds a master of science degree in Strategic Intelligence from the National Intelligence University and also a master of arts degree in International Service from American University. Walker has also attended and completed the National and International Security Program for senior executives at the Kennedy School of Government at Harvard University, the National Security Studies Program at George Washington University and the Seminar XXI Foreign Politics, International Relations and the National Interest Fellowship at the Massachusetts Institute of Technology.

== Military career ==
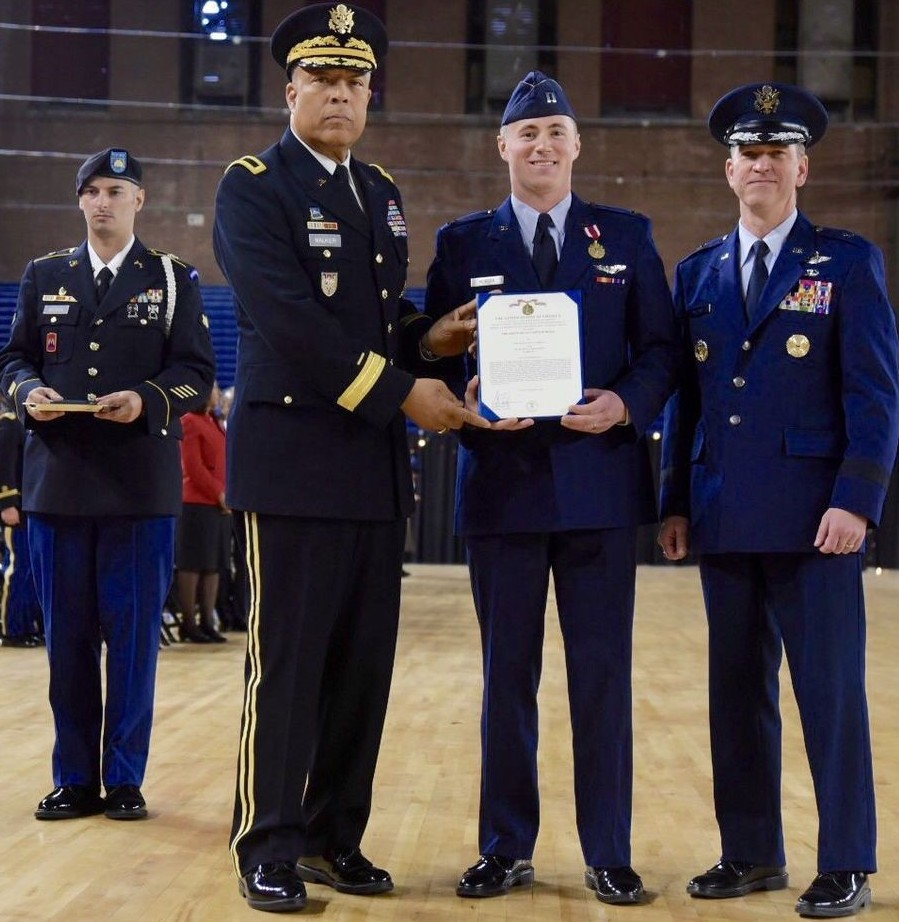
Brig. Gen. William J. Walker, D.C. National Guard, and Brig. Gen. Jeffery C. Bozard, Commander, 113th Wing, present Capt. John Morgan the Brigadier General Howard W. Kacy Flying Safety Award.

Walker was commissioned as Military Police 2nd Lieutenant assigned to the 50th Military Police Company, Somerset, New Jersey in May 1985. Since then, Walker has served as Commander, Alpha Company, 260th Military Intelligence Battalion; Commander, Land Component Command, District of Columbia Army National Guard; Chief of Staff, District of Columbia National Guard; Deputy Commander – Army, Joint Task Force, and Commander, Partnership for the Americas, Brigade Joint Task Force–Jamaica; Commander, Mobilization Augmentation Command, District of Columbia Army National Guard.

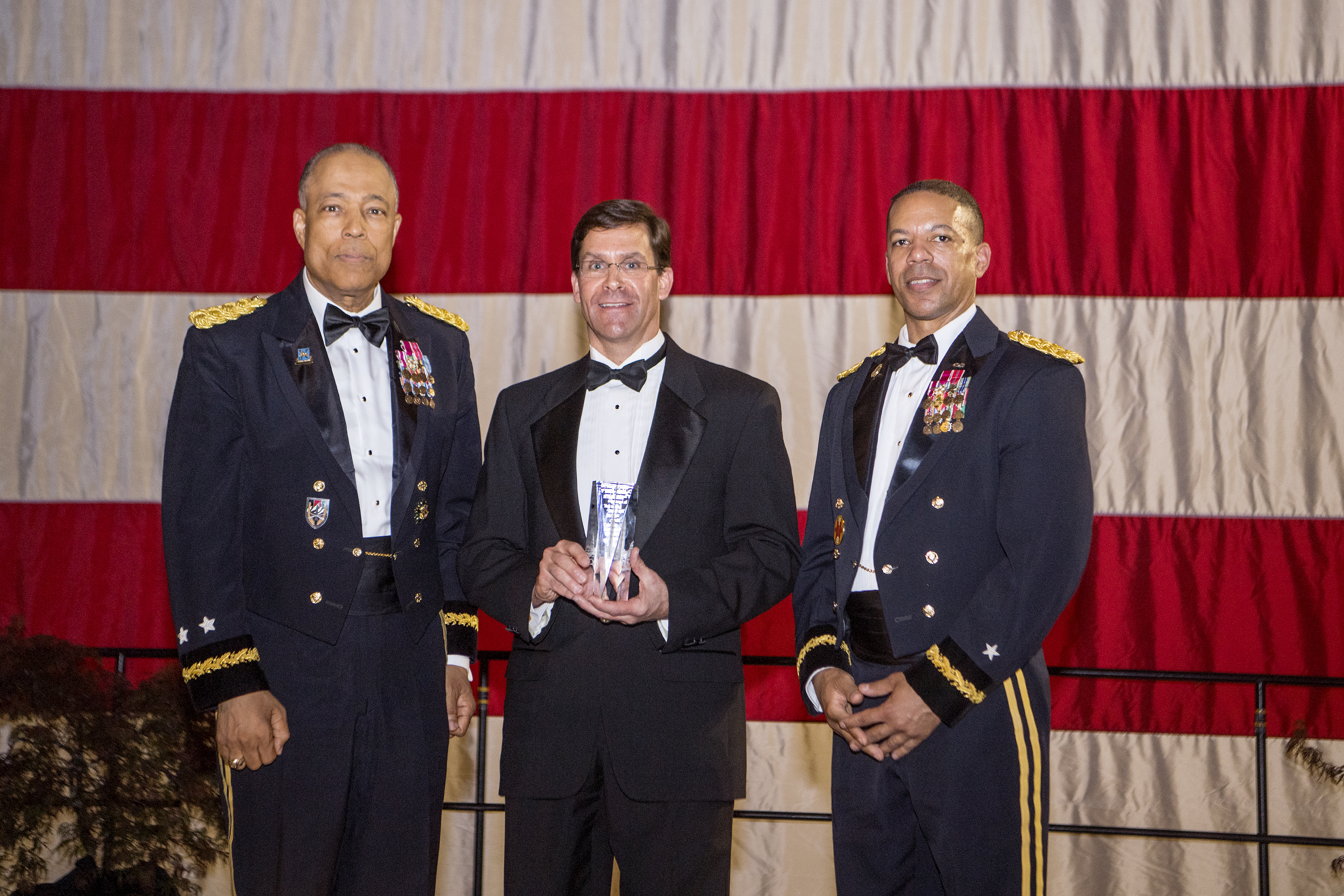
Secretary of the Army Dr. Mark T. Esper attends and speaks at the 2018 D.C. National Guard Military Ball, Washington, D.C., May 5, 2018.

Walker was called to serve with the U.S. Army in September 2001 immediately following the September 11 attacks. He was part of Operation Noble Eagle in a non-combat role and was an operations officer in the Pentagon. He later served with the NATO International Security Assistance Force and at the Embassy of the United States, Kabul.

In April 2015, he was appointed as the Commander, Land Component Command, District of Columbia National Guard and subsequently promoted to Brigadier General in November 2015.

During the 2017 Presidential Inauguration, Walker commanded the Joint Task Force-District of Columbia (JTF-DC) which deployed nearly 8,000 National Guard personnel, from 43 states and territories, to support security, traffic control, and crowd management during the Inauguration of Donald Trump. JTF-DC supported seven, federal and D.C. agencies during the presidential inauguration. National Guard personnel helped monitor the 248 traffic, access and security points, and blocking positions along the National Mall and parade route. The support provided by National Guard personnel enabled the Metropolitan Police Department of the District of Columbia to respond to 217 arrests, and the District of Columbia Fire and Emergency Medical Services Department to conduct 229 responses, 94 hospital transports and numerous medical tent treatments. The D.C. National Guard has supported 40 presidential inaugurations since 1861.

On January 20, 2017, Walker assumed the role of acting Commanding General, District of Columbia Army and Air National Guard, nicknamed the “Capitol Guardians”. In March 2018, President Donald Trump nominated Walker for promotion to Major General and selected him as the Commanding General.

On June 1, 2020, during an interview with CNN, Walker defended the DC National Guard by stating that DCNG troops were not involved in using force against protesters to clear Lafayette Park during George Floyd protests. Walker stated that DCNG troops held their positions and never advanced on the crowd. He emphasized that the use of force concerning protesters is always a last resort.

According to the final report by the United States House Select Committee on the January 6 Attack, detailing the events on January 6, 2021, Walker considered sending guardsmen to the U.S. Capitol without authorization from his higher-ups and then possibly resigning afterwards for circumventing the chain of command. After receiving advice from his lawyer, he ultimately waited for approval as required by the written commands from his superiors.

On March 5, 2021, Walker was selected by the United States House of Representatives as the new Sergeant-At-Arms. Walker replaced Paul D. Irving, who resigned after the 2021 United States Capitol attack. This appointment made Walker the first African-American in U.S. history to serve as the Sergeant-At-Arms in the House of Representatives. House Speaker Nancy Pelosi made the announcement of Walker's appointment that day. Pelosi administered the Oath of Office to Walker during a House pro forma session on April 26, hours prior to President Biden's address to Congress.

== Assignments ==
- May 1985 – September 1987, Platoon Leader, 50th Military Police Company, Somerset, New Jersey
- September 1987 – December 1989, Signal Officer, 250th Signal Battalion, Plainfield, New Jersey
- December 1989 – December 1990, Counterintelligence Officer, HHC, 260th Military Intelligence Battalion, Miami, Florida
- December 1990 – April 1993, Team Chief, All-source intelligence, Alpha Company, 260th Military Intelligence Battalion, Miami, Florida
- April 1993 – April 1994, Battalion Security Officer, S-2, 260th Military Intelligence Battalion, Miami, Florida
- April 1994 – May 1996, Commander, HHC, 260th Military Intelligence Battalion, Miami, Florida
- May 1996 – November 1996, Plans Officer, HHC, 260th Military Intelligence Battalion, Miami, Florida
- December 1996 – September 1997, MOS Support Officer, HHC, 260th Military Intelligence Battalion, Miami, Florida
- September 1997 – December 1999, Commander, Alpha Company, 260th Military Intelligence Battalion, Miami, Florida
- December 1999 – September 2001, Operations Officer / Branch Chief, Mobilization Augmentation Detachment, Washington, District of Columbia
- September 2001 – February 2002, Operations Officer, Headquarters, Department of the Army, Army Operations Center, Pentagon, Arlington, Virginia
- February 2002 – January 2005, Operations Officer, Headquarters, Department of the Army, Army Crisis Action Team, Pentagon, Arlington, Virginia,
- January 2005 – April 2008, Division Chief, Mobilization Augmentation Command, duty at the National Military Command Center, Pentagon, Arlington, Virginia
- August 2005 – June 2006, Student, Inter-American Defense College, Fort McNair, Washington, District of Columbia
- April 2008 – November 2008, J −2 Vice, Intelligence Directorate, National Guard Bureau, (Mobilization Augmentation Command-Detail) Arlington, Virginia
- November 2008 – July 2009, Commander, Partnership for the Americas, Brigade Joint Task Force – Jamaica, Washington, DC and Kingston, Jamaica
- July 2009 – June 2010, J −2 Vice, Intelligence Directorate, National Guard Bureau, (Mobilization Augmentation Command-Detail) Arlington, Virginia
- June 2010 – October 2011, Chief of Staff, District of Columbia Army National Guard, Joint Forces Headquarters, Washington, District of Columbia
- October 2011 – June 2012, Chief, Theater Observation Detachment – Afghanistan, & Senior International Security Assistance Force Liaison Officer, Center for Army Lessons Learned, Kabul, Afghanistan
- November 2011 – June 2012, Senior Military Strategist, Office of Transition Management, Embassy Kabul (Concurrent assignment), Kabul, Afghanistan
- June 2012 – March 2013, Chief of Staff, District of Columbia Army National Guard, Joint Forces Headquarters, Washington, District of Columbia
- March 2013 – March 2015, Commander, Mobilization Augmentation Command, Washington, District of Columbia
- April 2015 – January 2017, Commanding General, Land Component Command, Joint Forces Headquarters, Washington, District of Columbia
- January 2017 – February 2018, Acting Commanding General, Joint Forces Headquarters, Washington, District of Columbia
- March 2018 – April 2021, Commanding General, District of Columbia National Guard

== Awards and decorations ==
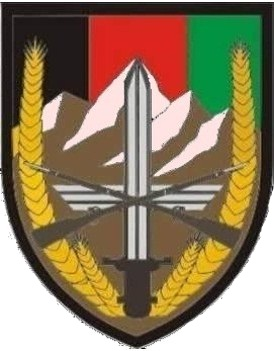
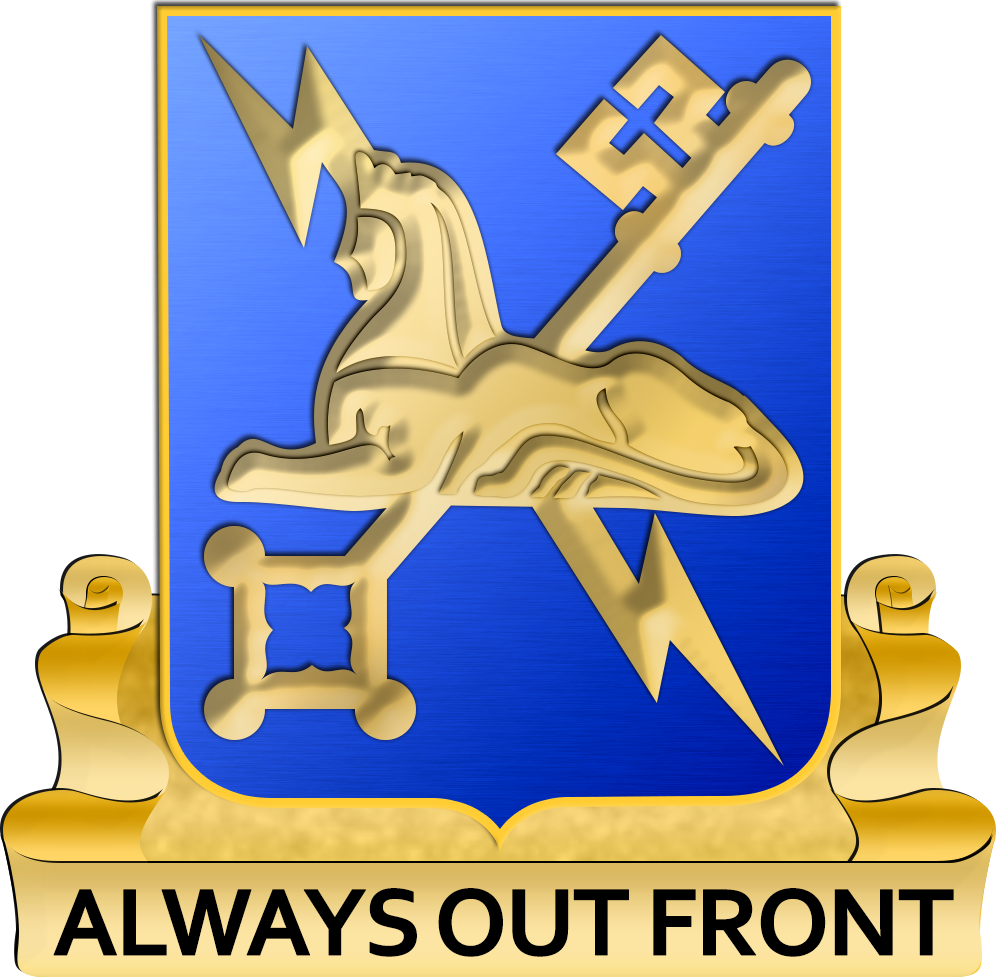
| Distinguished Service Medal (U.S. Army) |
| Legion of Merit with one oak leaf cluster |
| Bronze Star |
| Meritorious Service Medal with four oak leaf clusters |
| Army Commendation Medal |
| Air Force Commendation Medal |
| Joint Service Achievement Medal |
| Army Achievement Medal |
| Army Reserve Components Achievement Medal with 1 silver oak leaf cluster and 3 bronze oak leaf clusters |
| Joint Meritorious Unit Award |
| Army Superior Unit Award |
| Department of State Meritorious Honor Award |
| National Defense Service Medal |
| Afghanistan Campaign Medal |
| Global War on Terrorism Service Medal |
| Armed Forces Service Medal |
| Humanitarian Service Medal |
| Military Outstanding Volunteer Service Medal |
| Armed Forces Reserve Medal with Hourglass device and 2 Mobilization devices |
| Army Service Ribbon |
| Army Overseas Service Ribbon |
| Reserve Components Overseas Training Military Ribbon |
| NATO Medal |
| Army Staff Identification Badge |
| U.S. Forces Afghanistan Combat Service Identification Badge |
| Military Intelligence Regiment |

== Dates of promotions ==
| Insignia | Rank | Date |
|---|---|---|
| | Major general | June 28, 2018 |
| | Brigadier general | November 25, 2015 |
| | Colonel | September 29, 2006 |
| | Lieutenant colonel | March 10, 2003 |
| | Major | January 13, 1998 |
| | Captain | November 18, 1990 |
| | First lieutenant | April 19, 1988 |
| | Second lieutenant | April 20, 1985 |

== Civilian service ==
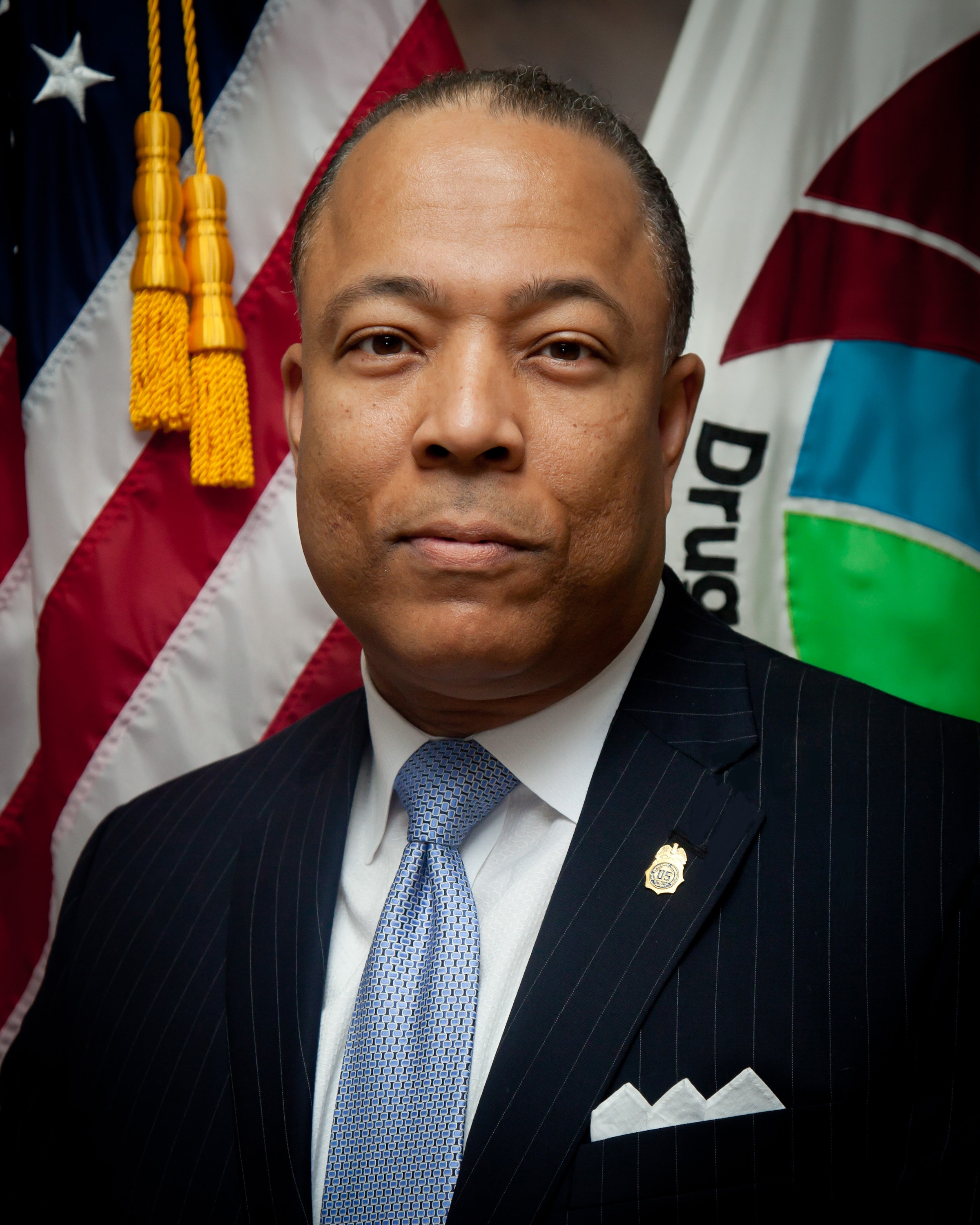
Special Agent William J. Walker, DEA, Retired, bio photograph

Walker is the former vice chairman, board of directors of the Young Marines, a military affiliated nonprofit service organization for boys and girls ages eight through high school that provides developmental programs that nurtures and encourages its over 10,000 members into becoming responsible citizens who enjoy a positive and drug-free lifestyle.

Walker retired as a Special Agent of the U.S. Drug Enforcement Administration (DEA) in 2014 with thirty years of distinguished service in positions of increasing responsibility. Promoted to the Senior Executive Service rank in August 2002, Deputy Assistant Administrator in February 2004 and appointed a member of the U.S. Intelligence Community (IC), Senior National Intelligence Service in September 2009, his final senior executive leadership position was Director of Strategic Warning, DEA Intelligence Division. Walker led intelligence officers who produced strategic assessments on high priority transnational drug threats to the United States in support of DEA's Global Drug Flow Attack Strategy. Prior senior executive assignments included Deputy Director, National Intelligence Coordination Center, (NIC-C), Office of the Director of National Intelligence.

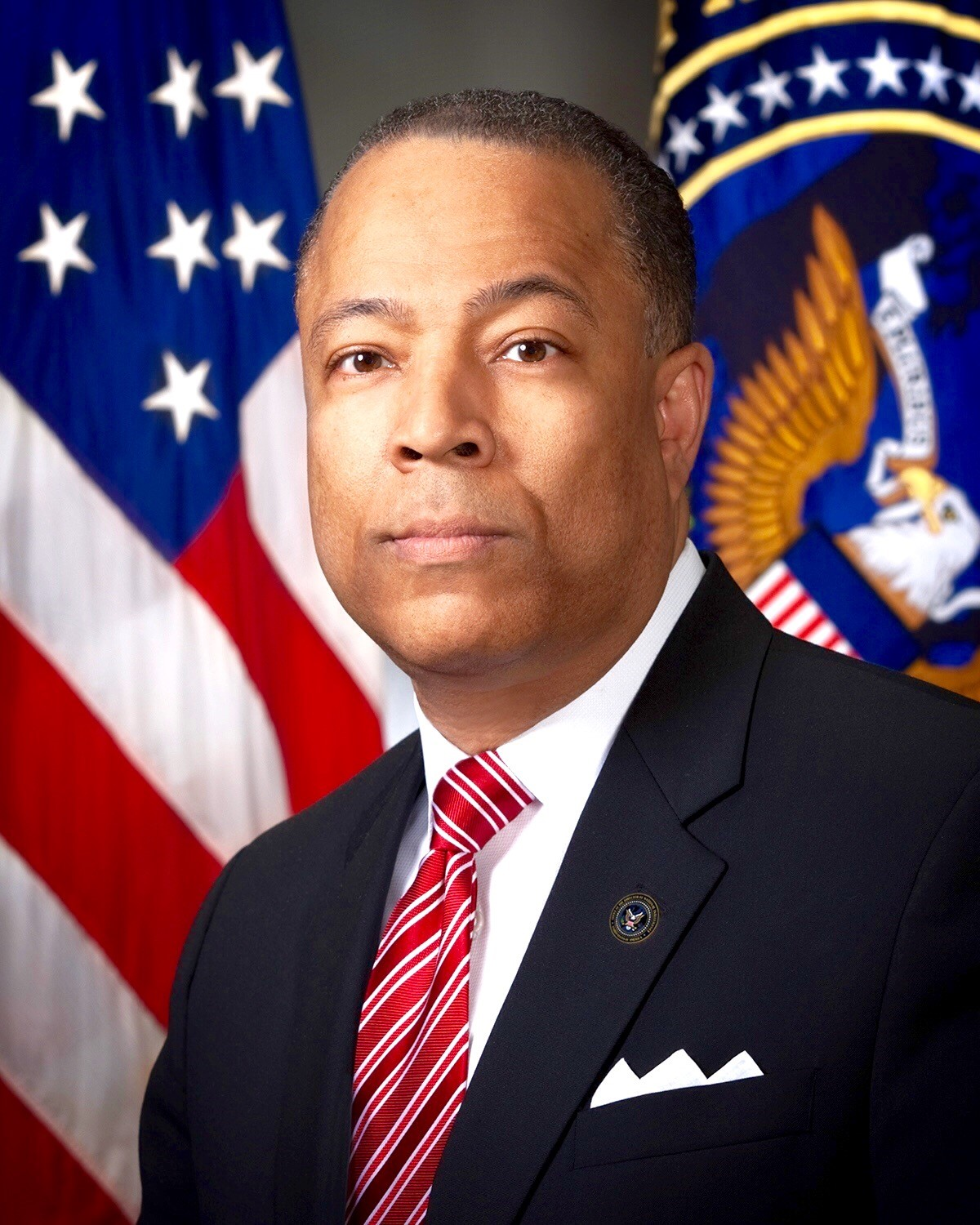
William J. Walker, Senior Intelligence Officer, Office of the Director of National Intelligence official photo

As Deputy Director of the NIC-C, Walker led intelligence officers in the day-to-day operations of an IC mission support activity. Prior to this assignment he completed the IC Senior Leadership Program and served as Deputy Director, DEA Office of Special Intelligence where his duties included senior liaison to the IC. Prior to this assignment he served as the Director and Deputy Assistant Administrator, DEA Office of Chemical and Pharmaceutical Diversion Control. In this position, Walker strengthened relationships with international partners and led delegations to Austria and Belgium to win support for global pharmaceutical and chemical compliance initiatives. Walker was promoted to the Senior Executive Service as the Associate Special Agent in Charge of the DEA New York Field Division where he led drug enforcement and regulatory control operations throughout New York State.

While assigned to DEA New York, Walker expanded and reinforced relationships with foreign counterparts having shared counter narcotics responsibilities and led multi-agency delegations to China, Hong Kong and Thailand to collaborate on international heroin investigations and subjects of common interests in Asia. Walker served as a criminal investigator in the DEA Chicago, New York and Miami Field Divisions and as a Narcotics Attaché in two foreign diplomatic posts. He held supervisory and management positions in the Caribbean Field Division (San Juan, Puerto Rico), DEA Headquarters in the Global Operations Division and in the Inspections Division. Walker also served in the White House Office of National Drug Control Policy as a senior liaison officer and policy advisor. During his career, Walker, a Spanish speaker, traveled to numerous countries to join forces with intelligence and law enforcement partners having shared interests and mutual concerns.

Walker concurrently served as the Director of the District of Columbia National Guard (DCNG) and was a member of the Headquarters Department of the Army Senior Executive Service. In accordance with Executive Order 11485, the President appoints the Commanding General/Director for the DCNG. On March 26, 2021, Politico reported that Walker was going to be appointed as House’s permanent sergeant-at-arms, being highly praised by Nancy Pelosi as, "His historic appointment as the first Black American to serve as Sergeant-at-Arms is an important step forward for this institution and our nation" and she noted his long career as a special agent with the Drug Enforcement Administration.

== Personal life ==
Walker was raised Catholic.

He is also a member of the Alpha Phi Alpha and Sigma Pi Phi fraternities.
