= District of Columbia Air National Guard =

- District of Columbia Air Guard emblem
- Active: 10 April 1941 - present
- Country: United States of America
- Allegiance: United States of America; District of Columbia
- Branch: United States Air Force
- Role: "To meet district and federal mission responsibilities."
- Part of: Air National Guard; District of Columbia National Guard
- Garrison/HQ: District of Columbia Air National Guard, 2001 East Capital St, SE, Washington DC 20003

Commanders
- DCNG Commander: Major General Sherrie L. McCandless
- 113th Wing Commander: Brigadier General Shannon D. Smith

Insignia
- Logo

Aircraft flown
- Fighter: F-16C/D Fighting Falcon
- Transport: C-38A Courier, C-40C Clipper

The District of Columbia Air National Guard (DC ANG) is the aerial militia and Air Force reserve organization of the District of Columbia, the capital city and federal district of the United States. It is, along with the District of Columbia Army National Guard, an element of the District of Columbia National Guard.

As militia units, the units in the District of Columbia Air National Guard are not in United States Air Force chain of command unless federalized by the president. As a federal district, the units of the DC ANG are under the direct jurisdiction of the president of the United States through the office of the Commanding General District of Columbia National Guard unless activated. The District of Columbia Air National Guard is headquartered in Washington D.C. The commander of the District of Columbia National Guard was Major General William J. Walker until he retired following his appointment as Sergeant-at-Arms of the U.S. House of Representatives in April, 2021.

== Overview ==
The District of Columbia Air National Guard is unique among the United States Air National Guard. Because Washington, D.C. lacks an Air Force installation with a runway, DC Air National Guard units are stationed at nearby Joint Base Andrews in Maryland.

Under the "Total Force" concept, District of Columbia Air National Guard units are considered to be Air Reserve Components (ARC) of the United States Air Force (USAF). District of Columbia ANG units are trained and equipped by the Air Force and are operationally gained by a Major Command of the USAF if federalized. In addition, the District of Columbia Air National Guard forces are assigned to Air Expeditionary Forces and are subject to deployment tasking orders along with their active duty and Air Force Reserve counterparts in their assigned cycle deployment window.

== Components ==
The District of Columbia Air National Guard consists of the following major unit:

- 113th Wing

Established 10 April 1941 (as: 121st Observation Squadron); operates: F-16C/D Fighting Falcon, C-38A and C-40C
Stationed at: Joint Base Andrews, Camp Springs, Maryland
Gained by: Air Combat Command

== History ==
The District of Columbia Air National Guard origins date to 10 April 1941 with the establishment of the 121st Observation Squadron and is oldest unit of the District of Columbia Air National Guard. It is one of the 29 original National Guard Observation Squadrons of the United States Army National Guard formed before World War II. The 121st Observation Squadron was ordered into active service on 1 September 1941 as part of the buildup of the Army Air Corps prior to the United States entry into World War II.

On 24 May 1946, the United States Army Air Forces, in response to dramatic postwar military budget cuts imposed by President Harry S. Truman, allocated inactive unit designations to the National Guard Bureau for the formation of an Air Force National Guard. These unit designations were allotted and transferred to various State National Guard bureaus to provide them unit designations to re-establish them as Air National Guard units.

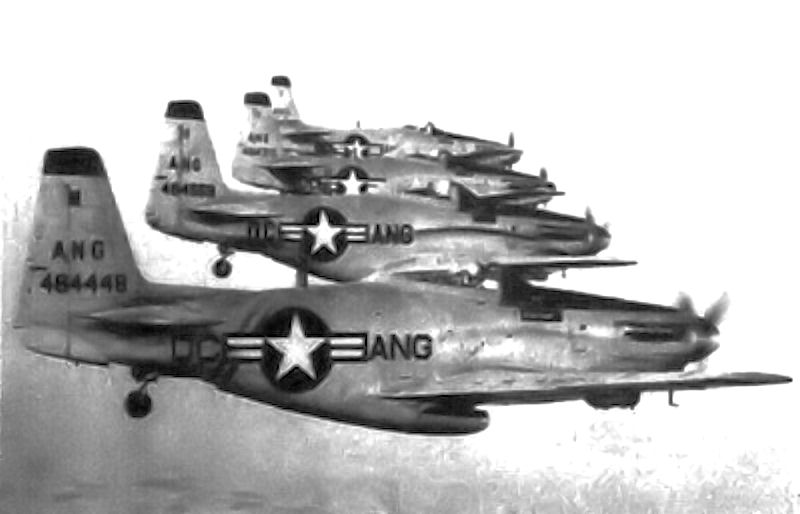
F-51H Mustangs of the 121st Fighter Squadron, 1949

The modern DC ANG received federal recognition on 26 October 1946 as the 121st Fighter Squadron at Andrews Army Airfield, Maryland. It was equipped with F-51D Mustangs and its mission was the air defense of Washington, D.C. On 2 November 1946 the 113th Fighter Group was allotted by the National Guard Bureau, extended federal recognition and activated. The 121st was assigned to the 113th as its operational squadron. 18 September 1947, however, is considered the District of Columbia Air National Guard's official birth concurrent with the establishment of the United States Air Force as a separate branch of the United States military under the National Security Act.

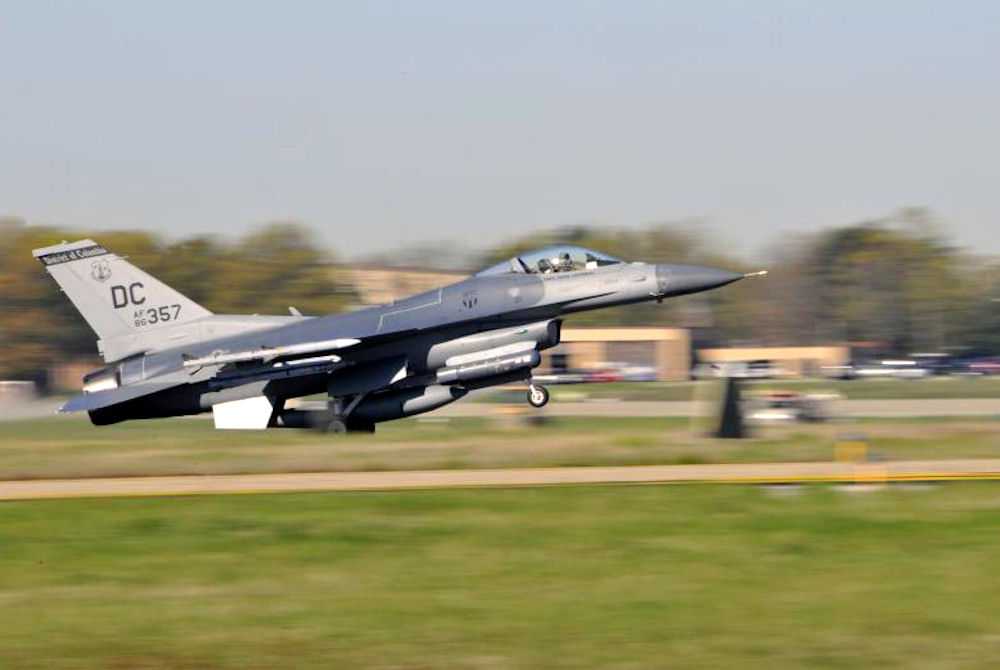
F-16C from the 121st Fighter Squadron lands at Andrews Air Force Base, April 3, 2012.

On February 1, 1952, the 8205th Air Base Squadron was activated as part of the DC ANG. The unit's mission was to receive, maintain, and store equipment as well as provide trained personnel for the soon-to-be formed 231st Airways and Air Communications Squadron (Mobile) (which was to be stationed at Camp Simms, Washington, DC). However, the unit was discontinued on August 26, 1952, when it merged with the 231st AACS (Mobile). Under a variety of names, since 1986 the 231st Combat Communications Squadron, the 231st remained active with the DC ANG into the twenty-first century.

Today, the District of Columbia Air National Guard primary mission is training of air combat and operational airlift crews for national defense. The 113th also provides a ready response force of fighters for the defense of the District of Columbia area 24/7. Members of the 113th also assist local and federal law enforcement agencies in combating drug trafficking in the District of Columbia on a case-by-case basis.

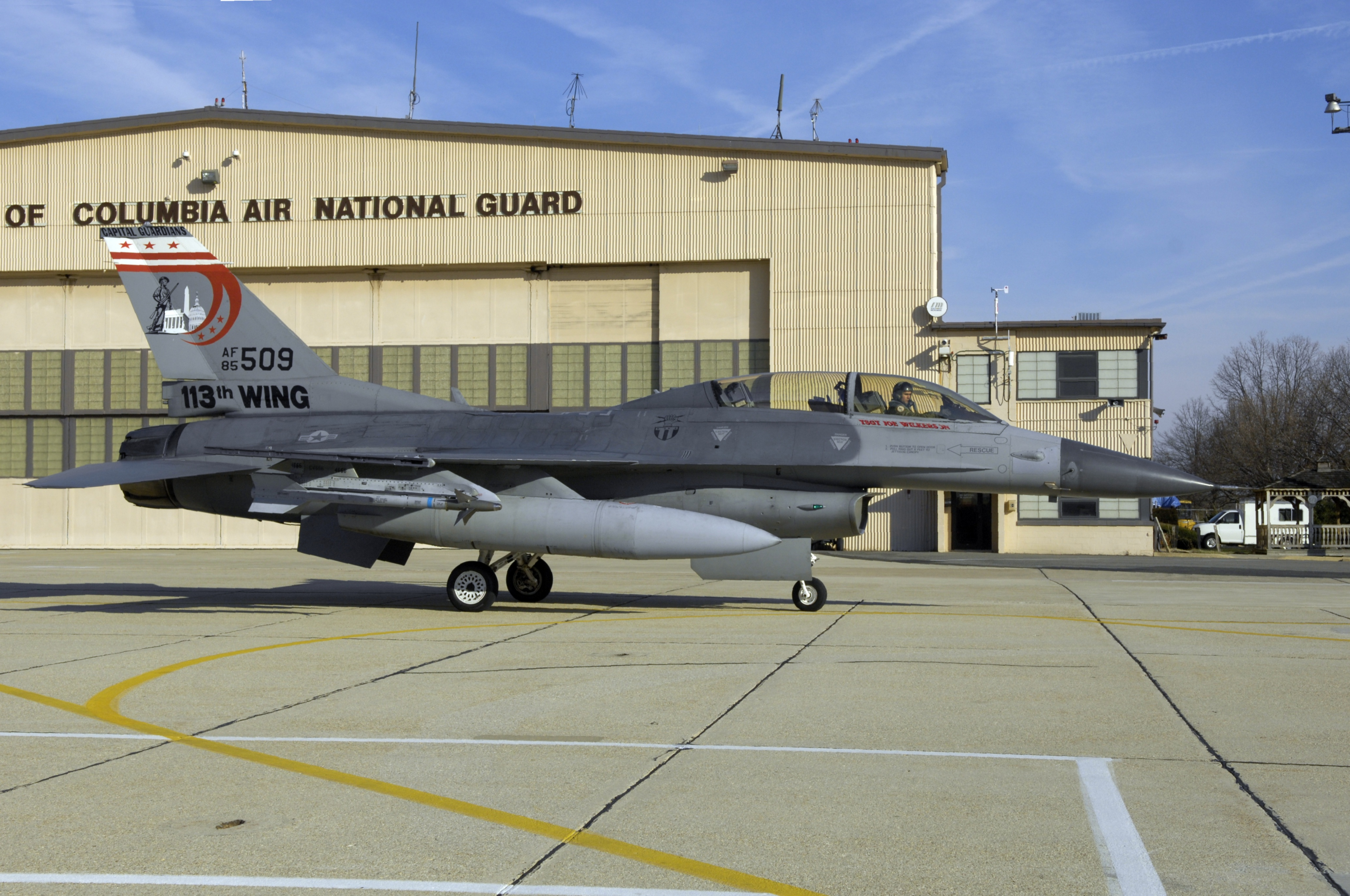
F-16D from the 121st Fighter Squadron at Andrews Air Force Base, January 16, 2008.

After the September 11th, 2001 terrorist attacks on the United States, elements of every Air National Guard unit of the DC ANG were activated in support of the global war on terrorism. Flight crews, aircraft maintenance personnel, communications technicians, air controllers and air security personnel were engaged in Operation Noble Eagle (ONE) air defense overflights of major United States cities. On 11 September 2001, the wing was given authorization for its pilots to shoot down threatening aircraft over Washington DC.

During one of those missions, on 11 May 2005 the squadron scrambled to intercept an aircraft that wandered into the no-fly zone around the White House. Customs officials had also scrambled a Sikorsky UH-60 Black Hawk helicopter and a UC-35B Cessna Citation jet at 11:47 a.m. to intercept the plane. The Customs aircraft gave way when the F-16s arrived. They dipped their wings - a pilot's signal to ‘follow me’ - and tried to raise the pilot on the radio. But the Cessna didn't change course and it was flying too slow for the F-16s. The frustrated pilots had to take turns dropping flares, breaking away and returning to drop more flares. One senior Bush administration counter-terrorism official said it was ‘a real finger-biting period’ because they came very close to ordering a shot against a general aircraft. Finally, when the Cessna came within three miles of the White House - just a few minutes flying time - it altered course.

Also, DC ANG units were deployed overseas as part of Operation Northern and Southern Watch, Operation Enduring Freedom in Afghanistan and Operation Iraqi Freedom in Iraq as well as other locations as directed.

== Special Recognition ==
D.C. Air Guard's 231st CMBTCS won the Air National Guard Mission Support Trophy for the year 1995. The trophy is given annually to the number one non-flying unit in the Air National Guard. It was estimated at the time that 600 Air National Guard units were eligible for the award. The Mission Support Trophy is the equivalent of the Spaatz Trophy for Air National Guard flying units.
