= I. Nelson Rose =

- Born: May 23, 1950 (age 76)
- Education: UCLA, Harvard Law School

I. Nelson Rose (born May 23, 1950) is an internationally known scholar, author, and public speaker recognized for his contributions to gambling and gaming law. He is currently a Professor Emeritus at Whittier College and a Visiting Professor at the University of Macau. Rose is best known for his internationally syndicated blog and column and his 1986 book, Gambling and the Law.

== Impact on legal gambling ==
Rose has been instrumental in protecting underage and problem gamblers. In “Compulsive Gambling and the Law,” Rose described how the views of society, and thus of the law, toward problem gambling are changing. In his writings and public presentations, he explained how courts and lawmakers struggled with the concept that a person might bet too much because they were ill, rather than because they were morally weak. He incorporated the California Council on Problem Gambling, got it tax exempt status, and served as its Legal Vice President for many years. He wrote the bill providing funding for the Texas Counsel on Problem Gambling. In 1995 he presented his research at the North American Think Tank on Youth Gambling at Harvard Medical School on the minimum age to gamble set by jurisdictions around the world. One of his findings was that New York had no minimum age for playing bingo for money. When his paper was published, he was contacted by the New York Council on Problem Gambling, who worked with him and succeeded in having the minimum age set at 18. He testified on behalf of the government of the Czech Republic in a multi-hundred-million-dollar international treaty hearing that some of the main purposes for regulating gambling, including the removal of thousands of slot machines in the country, was to protect minors and problem gamblers. He provided similar testimony to the government of New South Wales in Australia, which adopted his recommendations. In 1990, he argued the case of Erickson v. Desert Palace, Inc., before the Ninth Circuit, on behalf of a 19-year-old boy who was denied a million-dollar slot machine jackpot by Caesars Palace, and asked the U.S. Supreme Court to hear the appeal.

In 1979, while still a student at Harvard Law School, Rose developed the theory of the Third Wave of Legal Gambling. Examining the dates when laws had been enacted in the past, he concluded that legal gambling had twice before swept the nation. He correctly predicted that state lotteries, casinos, and other forms of gambling would once again be made legal in the United States. According to the theory, legal gambling will continue to spread until it is once again outlawed. The Third Wave of Legal Gambling theory inspired both entrepreneurs and governments to expand legal gaming, in part because it showed how much money could be made by the initial operators. “Suppose Prohibition of alcohol had just been repealed. The hypothetical owner of the first and only liquor store in a state would make a fantastic return on investment.” The Third Wave of Legal Gambling theory explains why the states differ so much in their approaches to gaming. Rose showed the legal problems created by prohibitions on lotteries written into state constitutions during the 18th and 19th centuries. For example, in 1990, the Mississippi Supreme Court discussed Rose's Third Wave of Legal Gambling theory in oral argument, concluding that that state's ancient constitutional ban on “lotteries” did not prevent the Mississippi Legislature from legalizing charity bingo. The next year the Legislature authorized casinos, making Mississippi the third leading casino state for a time, after Nevada and New Jersey.

He has testified as an expert witness in trials, including a criminal case in Paris, France, involving Internet gambling, a billion-dollar class action in Québec, and sports betting before the High Court of Justice, Business and Property Courts of England and Wales; international treaty arbitrations, including a multi-hundred-million dollar hearing held in Paris, France, against the government of the Czech Republic; legislative and administrative hearings, including the US Senate Indian Affairs Committee and the US-China Commission; and civil and criminal cases including on the history and meaning of terms such as “poker,” “lottery,” and “casino;” and the impact of a finding of unsuitability on a casino licensee in Nevada and Macau.

Rose was instrumental in the introduction of freemium games, subscription and sweepstakes gaming, and contests of skill. His clients included the largest no-purchase-necessary poker site, Ruth Parasol, inventor of PartyPoker, and King, inventor of Candy Crush®. Rose's testimony led to the introduction of Texas Hold 'Em and Pai Gow Poker into California cardrooms in the 1980s. His work with tribes and suppliers on the Indian Gaming Regulatory Act and in testifying on what is legal on Indian land helped lead to the creation of the modern tribal bingo hall and casino.

In 1999, the California Supreme Court cited Gambling and the Law in striking down Proposition 5, which had won the most expensive initiative campaign battle in the nation's history, and which would have legalized tribal casinos as “lotteries.” In 2006, the first NAFTA tribunal involving gaming adopted Rose's testimony, on behalf of the federal government of Mexico, on what constituted a slot machine as opposed to a game of skill. The North Dakota Supreme Court also adopted his position on what is a slot machine. The California Supreme Court adopted his testimony on what constituted a banking game, closing down the State Lottery's Keno.

Rose is the co-author of Internet Gaming Law (1st and 2nd editions), Blackjack and the Law, and the first casebook on the subject, Gaming Law: Cases and Materials. His work was pivotal in having gaming law recognized as a legitimate field of study, recognized by law publishing’s giant West Publishing when it asked him to co-author a book on the subject for its essential Nutshell series: Gaming Law in a Nutshell in 2012, and the second edition in 2017. Rose was co-editor-in-chief of the Gaming Law Review & Economics for more than 12 years and is now editor emeritus. He is often a featured speaker at gaming law conferences around the world.

== Education and legal practice ==
Rose graduated from UCLA with a B.A. in 1973 and with a J.D. in 1979 from Harvard Law School. Immediately following graduation from Harvard, Rose moved to Hawaii to practice law. He passed the Hawaii and California bars and has also been admitted to practice in federal courts, including Ninth Circuit Court of Appeals and the United States Supreme Court.

While in Hawaii, Rose established the state's first eye bank, the Hawai'i Lions Eye Bank & Makana Foundation, in 1981. He helped get state law changed to allow donor stickers on drivers' licenses and permit trained nurses to harvest tissue. Rose served as legal counsel to the eye bank from 1981-1983.

== Teaching ==
Rose joined what was then named Whittier College School of Law in 1973 as a Visiting Assistant Professor. Over the years, he was promoted to Full Professor with tenure. In Fall 1983, Rose developed and taught the first law school class on Gaming Law. Today there are at least 31 law schools with courses in Gaming Law, as well as graduate business schools and undergraduate colleges, many using the casebook Rose co-authored.

In 1993-1994, Rose became the first Visiting Scholar for the University of Nevada-Reno's Institute for the Study of Gambling and Commercial Gaming. His Gaming Law classes were open to undergraduates, graduate students, and practicing lawyers and regulators. At that time, Nevada had no law school, so Rose was the only person teaching Gaming Law in the nation's leading state for legal gaming.

In 2004, Rose taught a seminar on International Gaming Law for Whittier Law School's Summer Abroad program in China. He taught the same class the following years in Spain and France. He also taught classes on gaming law to the FBI; at colleges in Slovenia; and, at UNR's professional training courses in Reno, Tahoe, and to Macau Polytechnic in Macau. Rose began co-teaching with Professor Jorge Godinho, a post-graduate class in International Gaming Law at the University of Macau in 2007. Rose taught the course every summer, in May or June, through 2021. He also participated as the lead judge for students defending their Masters' theses on issues related to legal gambling.

In 2012 and 2015, Rose served as a Visiting Professor at the University of Melbourne Law School in Australia, teaching the post-graduate course “Gambling, Policy, and the Law” as part of the Melbourne Law Masters program. In addition, Rose delivered presentations on gaming law developments at international trade and gaming law conferences put on by the American Bar Association, International Masters of Gaming Law, International Association of Gaming Advisors (originally National and then International Association of Gaming Attorneys), US Conference of Mayors, National Conference of State Legislatures, International Political Science Association World Congress, National Council on Compulsive Gambling, North American Association of State and Provincial Lotteries, World Lottery Association, National Equine Law Conference, World Poker Industry Conference, and International Association of Gaming Regulators.

== Consultant and expert witness ==
Rose has testified as an expert witness on matters relating to gambling before the United States National Gambling Impact Study Commission and National Research Council of the National Academy of Sciences as well as in other legislative and administrative hearings, civil, and criminal trials, and international treaty arbitrations. He wrote amicus briefs, including to the Alabama Supreme Court, and has given dozens of presentations and classes to regulators, law enforcement, legislators, players, investors, suppliers and operators. He has acted as a consultant to major law firms, international corporations, licensed casinos, Indian tribes, and local, state, and national governments. He has also worked with the largest operators, including Nevada and Atlantic City casinos, California cardrooms, state and national lotteries, racetracks, Indian tribes, and online gambling operators.

Summary of Expert Witness Engagements
Jurisdiction	Entity	Subject Matter
Federal Governments	United States	Dept. of Justice prosecution of Gov. Edwin Edwards
Federal Governments	Canada	Indigenous and Northern Affairs
Federal Governments	Mexico	
Federal Governments	Czech Republic	Purposes of regulating gaming devices
Federal Governments	Japan	Japan Casino Regulatory Commission
Federal Governments	Laos	Suitability of casino licensee, methods of taxing casinos
States and Provinces	Arizona	Arizona Department of Gaming and Office of Problem Gaming
States and Provinces	California	California Gaming Policy Advisory Committee
States and Provinces	Delaware	Delaware Lottery (setting tax rate on sports books)
States and Provinces	Florida	Florida State Senate (Indian gaming compacts)
States and Provinces	Florida	Florida Department of Business and Professional Regulation (definition of poker)
States and Provinces	Hawaii	Hawaii House of Representatives (impact of legalizing casinos on Native Hawaiians' rights)
States and Provinces	Illinois	Illinois Gaming Board (casino applicants' duty of due diligence)
States and Provinces	Michigan	Michigan State Lottery (sweepstakes scam free entries)
States and Provinces	New Jersey	New Jersey Division of Gaming Enforcement ("fair odds" to all players)
States and Provinces	New Mexico	State Gaming Control Board
States and Provinces	Oregon	Governor's Task Force on Gaming
States and Provinces	Texas	Texas Comptroller (regulation of bingo)
States and Provinces	Washington	Washington State Gambling Commission
States and Provinces	British Columbia	British Columbia Attorney General (international lottery sales)
States and Provinces	Ontario	Alcohol and Gaming Commission of Ontario (vetting casino companies)
States and Provinces	Québec	VLTs and compulsive gambling
States and Provinces	New South Wales	Bergin Commission
American Territories	Northern Mariana Islands	Evaluation of casino writing off >$2 billion in bad debt
American Territories	District of Columbia	Gaming devices
American Territories	US Virgin Islands	Evaluation of casino proposal

== Publications ==
Rose began writing his column, “Gambling and the Law”, in 1983 for Gambling Times magazine. He later self-syndicated the column to other publications, both on and off the Internet, directed at laymen and professionals interested in the legal gambling industries.

Rose also writes scholarly journals and books, usually using his trademark Gambling and the Law. Articles include:

- “Daily Fantasy Sports and the Presidential Debate,” co-authored with Martin Owens
- “Casinos at the End of the World”
- “How Insurance Became (Mostly) Not Gambling”
- “How Securities Trading Became Legally Not Gambling”
- “Game on for Internet Gambling,” co-authored with Rebecca Bolin
- “The DOJ Gives States a Gift”
- “The Third Wave of Legal Gambling”
- “Leading Law Cases on Gambling”
- “Internet Gambling and the Law”
- “The International Law of Remote Wagering”
- “The Explosive But Sporadic Growth of Gambling in Asia”

Some of his popular writings include columns and blogs entitled:

- “Pete Rose Wishes He Had a Translator”
- “Casinos on Cruise Ships, Why Not on Airplanes?”
- “Betting on Beanie Babies”
- “Card Counting by Casinos”
- “Prohibition 2.0: The Unlawful Internet Gambling Act of 2006 Analyzed”
