= Debra Opri =

American lawyer

Debra Ann Opri
- Born: New Jersey, United States
- Education: New York University; Whittier Law School
- Occupation: Attorney at Law
- Website: debraopri.com

Debra Ann Opri is an American attorney. Opri's main office is in Los Angeles. Opri is licensed to practice law in California, New York, New Jersey, and the District of Columbia D.C. Opri is best known as a celebrity attorney and guest commentator on divorce and other high-profile cases

== Biography ==
Debra Opri was born in New Jersey. She graduated from New York University and from Whittier Law School, Los Angeles, California. Opri has been practicing law in California for over thirty years

== Attorney ==
Debra Opri is a lawyer who gained a reputation as a celebrity attorney when she successfully represented James Brown against a sexual harassment lawsuit by a former employee. Opri came to international attention as the lawyer who represented the parents of Michael Jackson, Joseph Jackson and Katherine Jackson, who hired Opri to protect their interests after their son was charged with child molestation; as well as Pamela Hasselhoff and Jermaine Jackson in their divorces.

Other high-profile cases included Anna Nicole Smith in a paternity action brought by her ex-boyfriend. Debra Opri was successful in securing the father's paternity rights and in his gaining custody of his daughter, Dannilynn, after Anna Nicole died in February, 2007. Opri also represented Kevin Hart in divorce proceedings, and Liza Marquez in a case against David Caruso. In the Nichelle Nichols case Opri represented Nichols manager Gilbert Bell. Opri also represents the football player, LeGarrette Blount, among other professionals.

Debra Opri is licensed to practice law in California, New York, New Jersey, and the District of Columbia [D.C.], and is the founder of the law firm, Opri & Associates, APLC, located in Beverly Hills, California.

== Media ==
Debra Opri continues to practice law through her law firm and continues to be a media personality on current legal cases and issues, with regular television and radio appearances.

Opri has provided comment to the International Business Times and Life and Style on Angelina Jolie and Brad Pitt's Divorce, The Daily Beast on Justin Bieber, Inside Edition on Jerry Lewis, and to Fox News on the Johnny Depp and Amber Heard breakup.
