= John P. Leedom =

American politician

John Peter Leedom
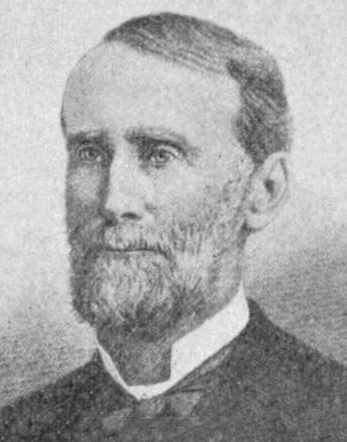

Member of the U.S. House of Representatives from Ohio's 7th district
- In office March 4, 1881 – March 3, 1883
- Preceded by: Frank H. Hurd
- Succeeded by: Henry Lee Morey

Sergeant at Arms of the United States House of Representatives
- In office 1884–1890
- Leader: John G. Carlisle
- Preceded by: George W. Hooker
- Succeeded by: Adoniram J. Holmes

Personal details
- Born: December 20, 1847 Adams County, Ohio, US
- Died: March 18, 1895 (aged 47) Toledo, Ohio, US
- Resting place: Odd Fellows Cemetery, Manchester, Ohio
- Party: Democratic

John Peter Leedom (December 20, 1847 – March 18, 1895) was a U.S. representative from Ohio for one-term from 1881 to 1883.

== Biography ==
Born in Adams County, Ohio, Leedom attended the common schools. He graduated from Smith's Mercantile College, Portsmouth, Ohio, in 1863. He went on to teach in the public schools of Portsmouth, and engaged in agricultural pursuits. Leedom was elected clerk of the court of common pleas of Adams County in 1874 and was reelected in 1877. He served as a member of the Democratic State central committee in 1879.

=== Congress ===
Leedom was elected as a Democrat to the Forty-seventh Congress (March 4, 1881 – March 3, 1883). He was an unsuccessful candidate for reelection in 1882 to the Forty-eighth Congress. He later served as Sergeant at Arms of the House of Representatives from 1884 to 1890. He died in Toledo, Ohio, and is interred in the Odd Fellows Cemetery, Manchester, Ohio.

== See also ==
- List of United States representatives from Ohio

== Sources ==
- United States Congress. "John P. Leedom (id: L000210)". Biographical Directory of the United States Congress.

U.S. House of Representatives
Preceded by Frank H. Hurd	Member of the U.S. House of Representatives from Ohio's 7th congressional district 1881–1883	Succeeded by Henry Lee Morey
Preceded by George W. Hooker	Sergeant at Arms of the United States House of Representatives; 1884–1890	Succeeded by Adoniram J. Holmes
