= George W. Hooker =

American Civil War Medal of Honor recipient

George White Hooker
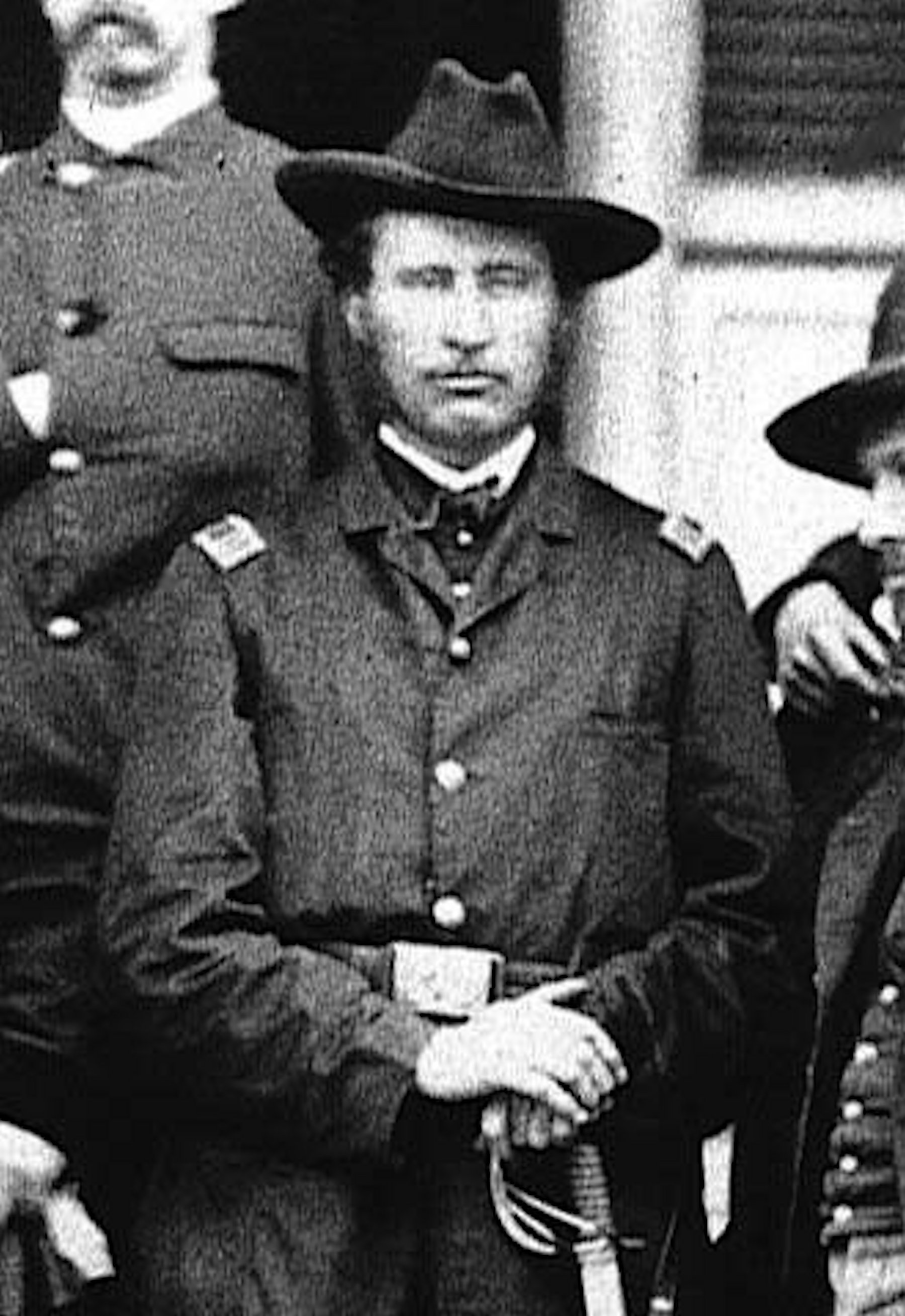
- Hooker in c. 1865

Sergeant at Arms of the United States House of Representatives
- In office December 5, 1881 – December 4, 1883
- Leader: J. Warren Keifer
- Preceded by: John G. Thompson
- Succeeded by: John P. Leedom

Personal details
- Born: February 6, 1838 Salem, New York, U.S.
- Died: August 6, 1902 (aged 64)
- Spouse: Mary G. Fisk
- Awards: Medal of Honor

Military service
- Allegiance: (United States) United States; Union
- Years of service: 1861–1865
- Rank: Lieutenant-colonel
- Unit: Company E, 4th Vermont Volunteer Infantry Regiment
- Battles/wars: Battle of Crampton's Gap, Battle of Cold Harbor

George W. Hooker (February 6, 1838 – August 6, 1902) was an American Civil War veteran who received the Medal of Honor. In 1862 Hooker captured 116 Confederate soldiers along with their colonel and company colors by himself. For this action he was awarded the Medal of Honor. Hooker was elected in 1879 and 1880 as department commander of the Grand Army of the Republic in Vermont. He was also elected as Brattleboro's representative in the Vermont General Assembly, to which he was re-elected in 1882.

== Early life ==
George White Hooker was born in Salem, New York, on February 6, 1838. He received his education at a common school in Londonderry, which was supplemented in West River Academy. After this, he became a clerk in the towns of Jamaica, Bellows Falls, and Londonderry. In 1860, Hooker became a traveling salesman for W. & J. Flint of Boston, where he sold tea and coffee until the beginning of the war.

== Civil War ==
After the outbreak of the Civil War, Hooker enlisted as a private in Company F, Fourth Vermont Regiment in 1861. He rose through the ranks very quickly, being promoted to sergeant-major near the end of 1861, to second lieutenant of Company E in early 1862, and to first lieutenant in mid-1862. He held this rank throughout the Peninsular campaign, and would later become a colonel.

=== Battle of Crampton's Gap ===
On September 14, 1862, General William T. H. Brooks ordered Hooker (who was a lieutenant at the time) to take four companies to take out a Confederate artillery position. When riding ahead of his men, Hooker stumbled across the Confederate 16th Virginia Infantry, who had become disoriented and were mostly out of ammunition. Instead of being shot, captured, or surrendering himself, Hooker boldly told the Confederate commanding officer, Major Francis D. Holladay, that a large mass of Union troops was right behind him, and suggested they surrender to him. Holladay complied, handing over his sword and company colors along with 116 Confederate men. For this action Hooker was awarded the Medal of Honor on September 17, 1891.

=== Other battles ===
In June 1864, Hooker was the adjutant-general for the First Brigade, Second Division, Eighteenth Army Corps, in charge of nine regiments during the Battle of Cold Harbor. Hooker received several serious wounds during the battle: he was shot five times, twice in the legs, twice in the body, once through the left shoulder, and one that shattered his collar bone, leaving the subclavian artery bare. Hooker, however, recovered and was assigned to the Third Division, Twenty-fourth Corps and served with the First Brigade. After the surrender of Richmond and the end of the war, Hooker tendered his resignation but was refused twice. Hooker was able to muster out with the rank of lieutenant-colonel in 1865.

== Post-Civil War ==
After the war, Hooker went back to being a traveling salesman, this time for wholesale grocers Carr, Chase & Raymond. He later became a junior partner with the banker-brokers William A. Belden & Company and was a successful businessman in New York for several years. In 1876, Hooker moved to Brattleboro, Vermont, where he became interested in politics. In 1878, Hooker was named as Governor Redfield Proctor's chief of staff, carrying the rank of colonel. Hooker was elected in 1879 and 1880 as department commander of the Grand Army of the Republic in Vermont, and received a third nomination to be re-elected, which he declined. In 1880, he was part of the national Republican convention in Chicago as a delegate-at-large and also became a member of the national Republican committee. In 1881, Hooker was named as the sergeant at arms for the United States House of Representatives.

One year earlier, he was elected as Brattleboro's representative in the Vermont House of Representatives, to which he was re-elected in 1882. During his first session, he was elected to judge-advocate-general by the Legislature. In his second, he was elected chairman of the ways and means committee. Hooker was also very involved with his community and held several positions, like selectman, bailiff, and road commissioner. He was the president of the Vermont Agricultural Society, Vermont's Horse Breeders' Association, and held office for the Valley Fair Association from its formation in 1886. He was part of forming and raised most of the subscriptions for stock for the Valley Fair Association. During the remainder of his years he was active in the Hooker, Corser & Mitchell Overall Company.

=== Death ===
George W. Hooker died from heart disease on August 6, 1902.

He is buried at Prospect Hill Cemetery, Brattleboro, Vermont.

== See also ==
- List of Medal of Honor recipients

U.S. House of Representatives
Preceded by John G. Thompson	Sergeant at Arms of the United States House of Representatives; December 5, 1881–December 4, 1883	Succeeded by John P. Leedom
