= Florence-Marie Cooper =

American judge (1940–2010)

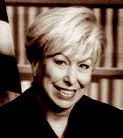

Judge of the United States District Court for the Central District of California
- In office November 15, 1999 – January 15, 2010
- Appointed by: Bill Clinton
- Preceded by: Linda H. McLaughlin
- Succeeded by: John Kronstadt

Judge of the Los Angeles County Superior Court
- In office 1991–1999
- Appointed by: Pete Wilson

Judge of the Los Angeles County Municipal Court
- In office 1990–1991
- Appointed by: George Deukmejian

Personal details
- Born: February 9, 1940 Vancouver, British Columbia, Canada
- Died: January 15, 2010 (aged 69) Santa Monica, California, U.S.
- Education: City College of San Francisco; Whittier College School of Law (JD)

Florence-Marie Cooper (February 9, 1940 – January 15, 2010) was a United States district judge of the United States District Court for the Central District of California.

== Early life and education ==
Cooper was born in Vancouver, British Columbia, Canada and moved to San Francisco, California with her family in 1952. Cooper graduated from high school in 1958 and began working as a legal secretary. She attended night classes at City College of San Francisco for five years, but did not graduate from the school. In 1971, her husband's job was transferred to Los Angeles, and Cooper began attending Beverly Law School under a program for students who had not graduated from college. During that time, Beverly Law School merged into Whittier College School of Law, from which Cooper received her Juris Doctor in 1975 as the top student in her class.

== Legal and academic career ==
Cooper served as law clerk for Judge Arthur Alarcón, Los Angeles Superior Court, Appellate Department (1975–1977). She served as deputy city attorney of Los Angeles, California (1977). She was senior research attorney for Judge Arthur Alarcon, Second Appellate District, California Court of Appeal (1978–1980). She was a senior research attorney for Judge Woods, Second Appellate District, California Court of Appeal (1980–1983). She was an adjunct professor at San Fernando Valley College School of Law (1980–1985).

== Judicial career ==
=== State judicial service ===
Cooper was court commissioner of the Los Angeles Superior Court from 1983 to 1990. She then served as a judge of Los Angeles Municipal Court from 1990 to 1991 and of the Los Angeles Superior Court from 1991 to 1999.

=== Federal judicial service ===
She was nominated by President Bill Clinton on July 14, 1999, to a seat vacated by Linda H. McLaughlin on the United States District Court for the Central District of California. She was confirmed by the United States Senate on November 10, 1999, and received her commission on November 15, 1999. She served as a United States district judge until her death of lymphoma on January 15, 2010, aged 69.

== In popular culture ==
Cooper is portrayed briefly by actress Elizabeth McGovern in the 2015 feature film Woman in Gold.

== See also ==
- List of Jewish American jurists

Legal offices
Preceded by Linda H. McLaughlin	Judge of the United States District Court for the Central District of California; 1999–2010	Succeeded by John Kronstadt
