= Linda Hodge McLaughlin =

American judge (1942–1999)

Judge of the United States District Court for the Central District of California
- In office August 17, 1992 – March 7, 1999
- Appointed by: George H. W. Bush
- Preceded by: Seat established by 104 Stat. 5089
- Succeeded by: Florence-Marie Cooper

Personal details
- Born: February 13, 1942 Los Angeles, California
- Died: March 7, 1999 (aged 57) Santa Ana, California
- Education: Stanford University (BA); UC Berkeley School of Law (LLB)

Linda Hodge McLaughlin (February 13, 1942 – March 7, 1999) was a United States district judge of the United States District Court for the Central District of California.

== Education and career ==
Born in Los Angeles, California, McLaughlin received a Bachelor of Arts degree from Stanford University in 1963 and a Bachelor of Laws from the University of California, Berkeley, Boalt Hall School of Law in 1966. She was in private practice in Los Angeles from 1966 to 1970, and in Newport Beach and Costa Mesa from 1970 to 1980. She was a judge on the California Municipal Court, North Orange County Judicial District from 1980 to 1982, and then on the California Superior Court, Orange County from 1982 to 1992. She was an associate justice pro tempore on the California Supreme Court in 1984, and on the California Court of Appeals, Fourth Appellate Dist., Div. 3, in 1985.

== Federal judicial service ==
On March 20, 1992, McLaughlin was nominated by President George H. W. Bush to a new seat on the United States District Court for the Central District of California created by 104 Stat. 5089. She was confirmed by the United States Senate on August 12, 1992, and received her commission on August 17, 1992. McLaughlin served in that capacity until her death, in 1999, in Santa Ana, California. On January 8, 1999, McLaughlin was injured in a car crash, for which she was hospitalized for an extended period of time. While hospitalized, she developed pneumonia and died, two months after the accident.

== Sources ==
- FJC Bio

Legal offices
Preceded by Seat established by 104 Stat. 5089	Judge of the United States District Court for the Central District of California; 1992–1999	Succeeded by Florence-Marie Cooper
