= Thomas Beverly Randolph =

Thomas Beverly Randolph (1793 – November 12, 1867) was an American military officer who graduated from the United States Military Academy. He served during the War of 1812, resigning from the army in 1815, later returning to military service with the Virginia militia, serving as a cavalry colonel from 1822 until 1829 and as a brigadier general 1829 until 1834. Randolph served as Sergeant at Arms of the United States House of Representatives from 1833 until 1835. He served under Zachary Taylor during the Mexican–American War. Watkins refused a general's commission in the Confederate service while residing at his son's home in Missouri. Missouri Governor Claiborne Fox Jackson and Confederate sympathizer had appointed him as a district/division commander for the state.

== See also ==
- Sergeant at Arms of the United States House of Representatives
- First Families of Virginia
- Randolph family of Virginia

U.S. House of Representatives
Preceded by John O. Dunn	Sergeant at Arms of the United States House of Representatives; 1833–1835	Succeeded by Roderick Dorsey
