= Wilson Livingood =

Sergeant at Arms of the United States House of Representatives (born 1936)

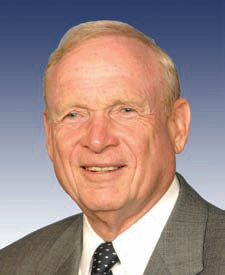

35th Sergeant at Arms of the United States House of Representatives
- In office January 4, 1995 – January 17, 2012
- Leader: Newt Gingrich; Dennis Hastert; Nancy Pelosi; John Boehner
- Preceded by: Werner Brandt
- Succeeded by: Paul D. Irving

Personal details
- Born: October 1, 1936 (age 90) Philadelphia, Pennsylvania, U.S.
- Party: Independent
- Education: Michigan State University

Wilson "Bill" Livingood (born October 1, 1936) is a 33-year veteran of the United States Secret Service who was elected Sergeant at Arms of the United States House of Representatives on January 4, 1995, for the 104th Congress, and served through the 112th Congress. Livingood was the 35th person to hold the post since the U.S. House of Representatives first met in New York City in 1789.

U.S. House of Representatives
Preceded by Werner W. Brandt	35th Sergeant at Arms of the United States House of Representatives; 1995–2012	Succeeded by Paul D. Irving
