= William McFarland (security officer) =

American Policeman

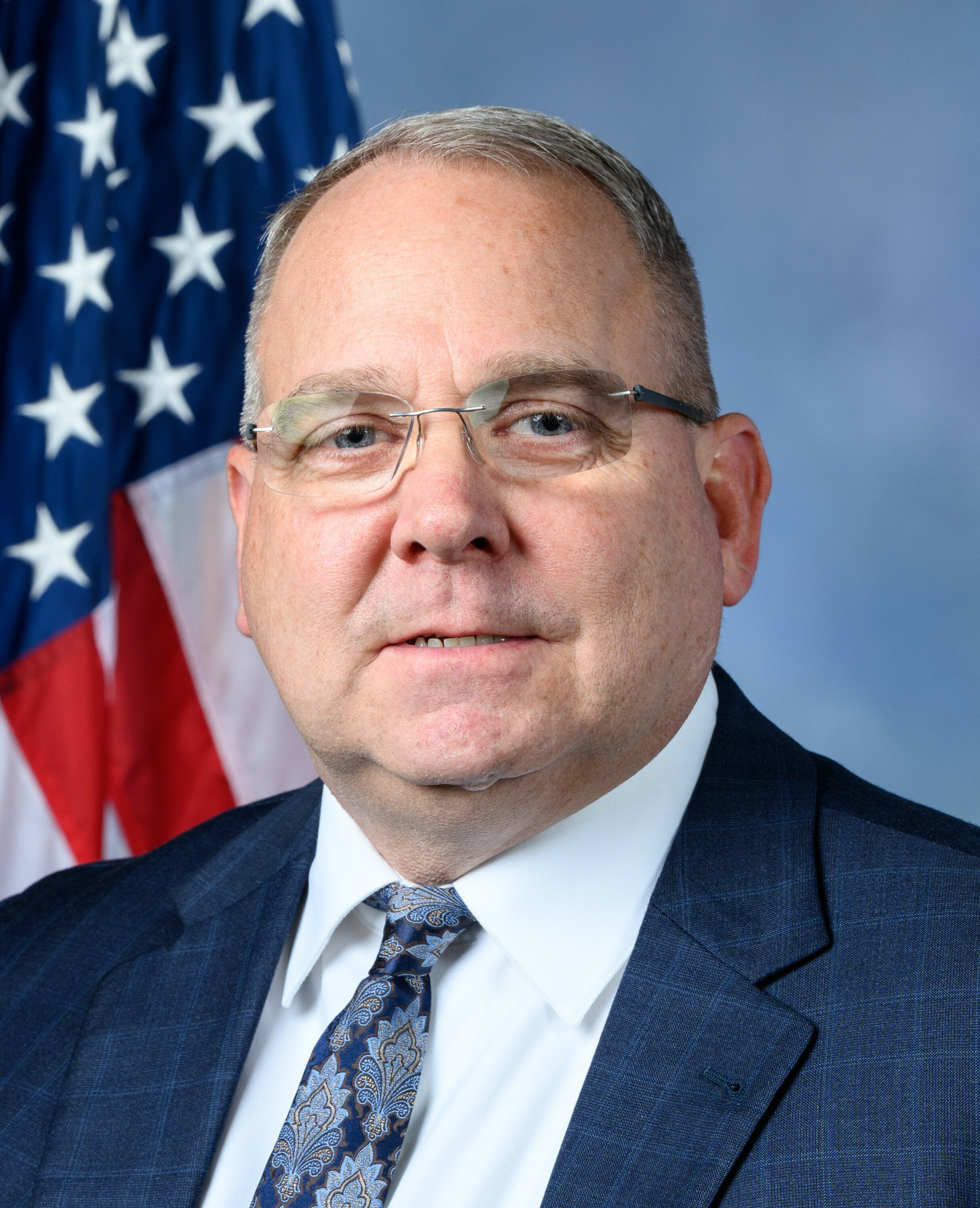
- Official portrait, 2023

38th Sergeant at Arms of the United States House of Representatives
- Incumbent
- Assumed office January 7, 2023
- Leader: Kevin McCarthy; Mike Johnson
- Preceded by: William J. Walker

Personal details
- Born: Severn, Maryland, U.S.
- Education: University of Maryland, College Park (BA); Webster University (MA)

William McFarland is an American law enforcement officer and security official who serves as the current sergeant at arms of the United States House of Representatives, after having been appointed by Speaker Kevin McCarthy on January 7, 2023.

== Biography ==
McFarland began his career working at the National Security Agency in 1990. In 1991 he became a Security Aide for the United States Capitol Police.

McFarland transitioned to the Permanent Select Committee on Intelligence in 1995, where he was Director of Security. From 2005 to 2021, he served as Director of the Office of House Security for the House Sergeant at Arms. McFarland worked in the private sector from 2021 until 2023 until he was sworn in as House Sergeant at Arms.

McFarland holds a Bachelor of Arts in Criminology from the University of Maryland and a Master of Arts in Security Management from Webster University at Bolling Air Force Base.
