= Timothy Blodgett =

American law enforcement officer (born 1966)

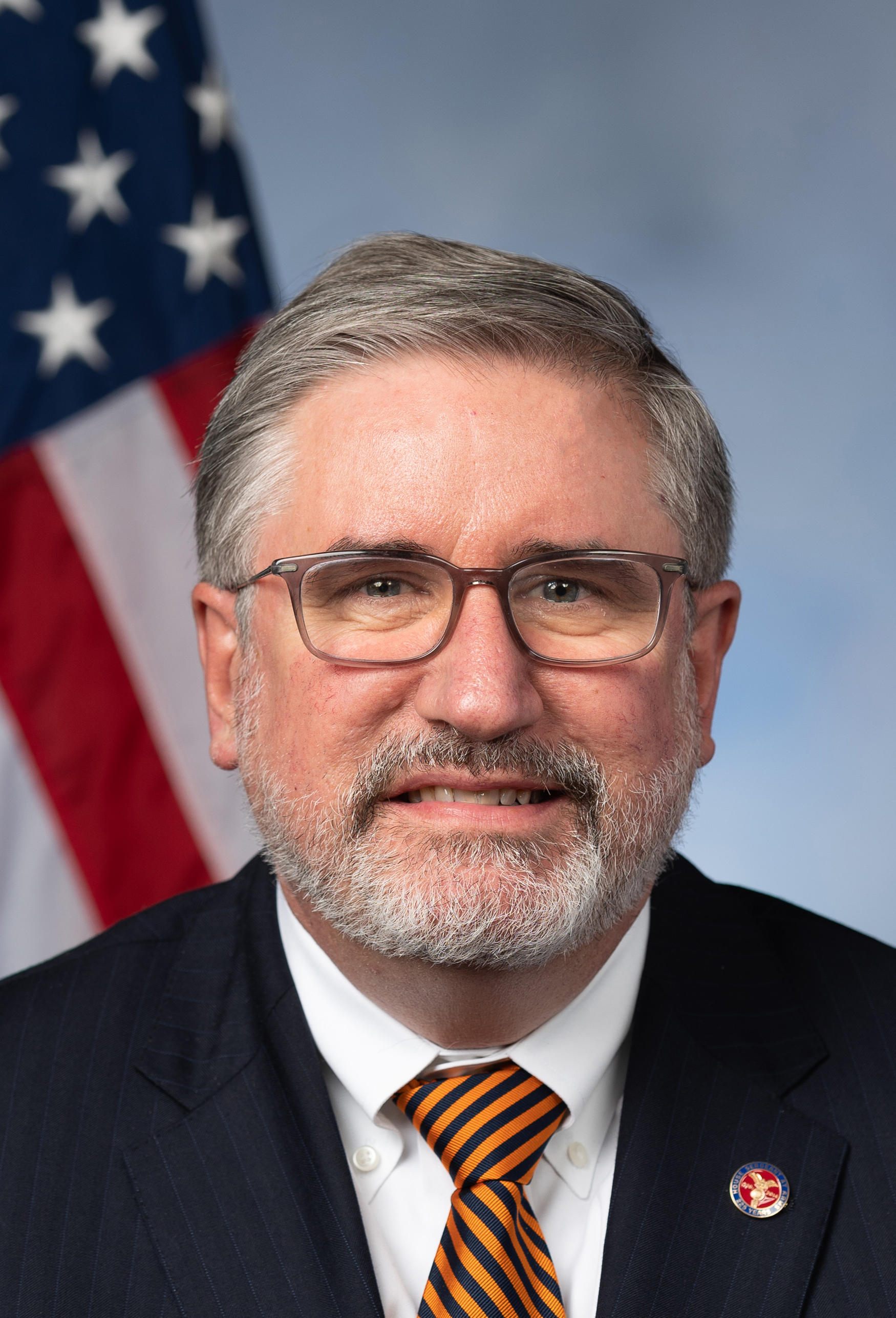

Sergeant at Arms of the United States House of Representatives
- Acting
- In office January 12, 2021 – April 21, 2021
- Leader: Nancy Pelosi
- Preceded by: Paul D. Irving
- Succeeded by: William J. Walker

Personal details
- Born: Timothy Paul Blodgett; June 16, 1966 (age 60) Rochester, New York
- Education: Buffalo State College (BA); American University (JD)

Timothy Paul Blodgett is an American law enforcement officer who served as the Sergeant at Arms of the United States House of Representatives from January to April 2021.

== Early life and education ==
Blodgett was born in Rochester, New York on June 16, 1966. Blodgett attended Buffalo State College earning a B.A. Magna Cum Laude in Political Science and Philosophy 1988 and attended the Washington College of Law at American University earning a J.D. degree in 1992.

== Career ==
=== Early career ===
Blodgett was admitted to the bars of the State of New York, the District of Columbia, the Western District of New York, and the Supreme Court. Blodgett clerked for Associate Chief Administrative Law Judge G. Marvin Bober and the Department of Labor and worked primarily on compensation issues involving Black Lung and Asbestosis from 1991 to 1993. Blodgett was then hired as an associate for Harris, Chesworth, and O’Brien concentrating on labor and employment and municipal issues involving law enforcement agencies from 1994 to 2000. Blodgett then worked as an associate for Krukowski and Costello in Washington, D.C. concentrating on labor and employment matters from 2000 to 2002.

Blodgett began his career on Capitol Hill as a senior attorney and Administrative Counsel for the Chief Administrative Officer of the House from 2002 to 2009. He began with the Office of the Sergeant at Arms as Counsel and served as Deputy from 2009 to 2021.

=== Sergeant at Arms of the United States House of Representatives ===
Blodgett was sworn in as the Sergeant at Arms of the United States House of Representatives on January 12, 2021, following the resignation of Paul D. Irving after the storming of the United States Capitol five days prior.

As an elected officer of the House of Representatives, the Sergeant at Arms is the chief law enforcement and protocol officer of the House of Representatives and is responsible for maintaining order in the House side of the United States Capitol complex. The Sergeant at Arms reviews and implements all issues relating to the safety and security of Members of Congress and the Capitol complex. The Sergeant at Arms also coordinates extensively with the U.S. Capitol Police and various intelligence agencies to assess threats against Members of Congress and the Capitol complex.

He resigned on April 21, 2021, and was succeeded by William J. Walker.

== Personal life ==
Blodgett lives in the state of Virginia.
