= Sergeant at Arms of the United States House of Representatives =

Parliamentary officer

Sergeant at Arms of the U.S. House of Representatives
- Seal of the House of Representatives

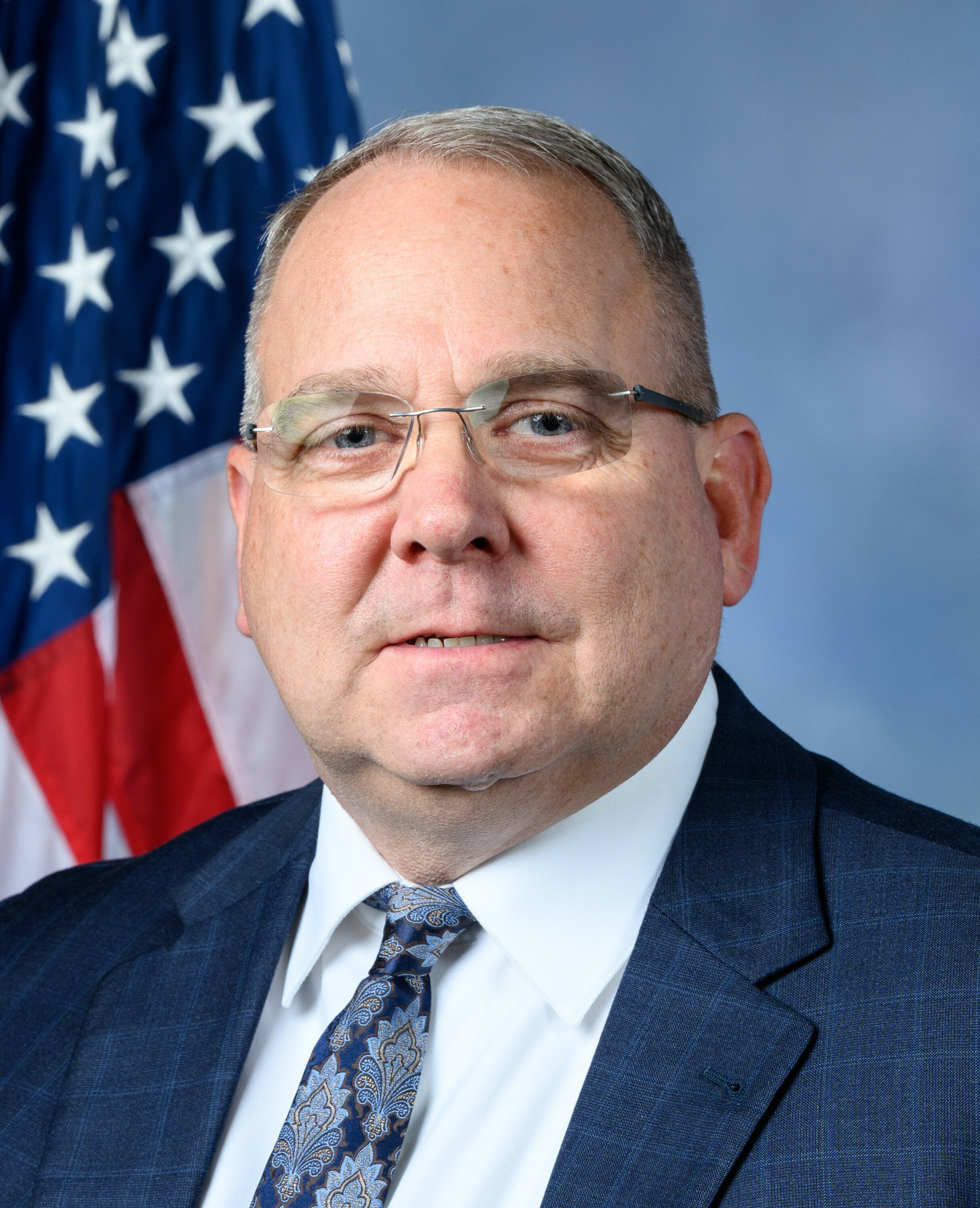
- Incumbent; William McFarland since January 7, 2023
- Nominator: Speaker of the House
- Appointer: Elected by the House
- Term length: Two years
- Inaugural holder: Joseph Wheaton
- Website: www.house.gov/the-house-explained/officers-and-organizations/sergeant-at-arms

The sergeant at arms of the United States House of Representatives is an officer of the House with law enforcement, protocol, and administrative responsibilities. The sergeant at arms is elected at the beginning of each Congress by the membership of the House.

== Duties ==
In one of its first resolutions, the 1st United States Congress (April 14, 1789) established the role of Sergeant at Arms of the United States House of Representatives.

=== Security ===
As the chief law enforcement officer of the House, the sergeant at arms is responsible for security in the House wing of the United States Capitol, the House office buildings, and on adjacent grounds. Under the direction of the speaker of the House or other presiding officer, the sergeant at arms plays an integral role in maintaining order and decorum in the House chamber.

The sergeant at arms is also responsible for ensuring the safety and security of members of Congress, the congressional staff, visiting dignitaries, and tourists. Toward this end, the sergeant at arms works in concert with the Senate sergeant at arms and the Architect of the Capitol. These three officials, along with the chief of the Capitol Police ex officio, comprise the Capitol Police Board.

In 2015, at a House committee hearing chaired by Candice Miller, then House Sergeant at Arms Paul D. Irving said that he gave considerable time to ensuring House members' safety and their staff, and visitors to the House, including threat and intelligence monitoring and analysis by reviewing threats and intelligence directed to House members. He said that he monitored events at the Capitol complex, such as demonstration activity, committee hearings, head of state visits, and major events taking place on the complex. He said that on a daily basis, he dealt with the Senate sergeant at arms about security for the Capitol complex.

=== Protocol and ceremony ===
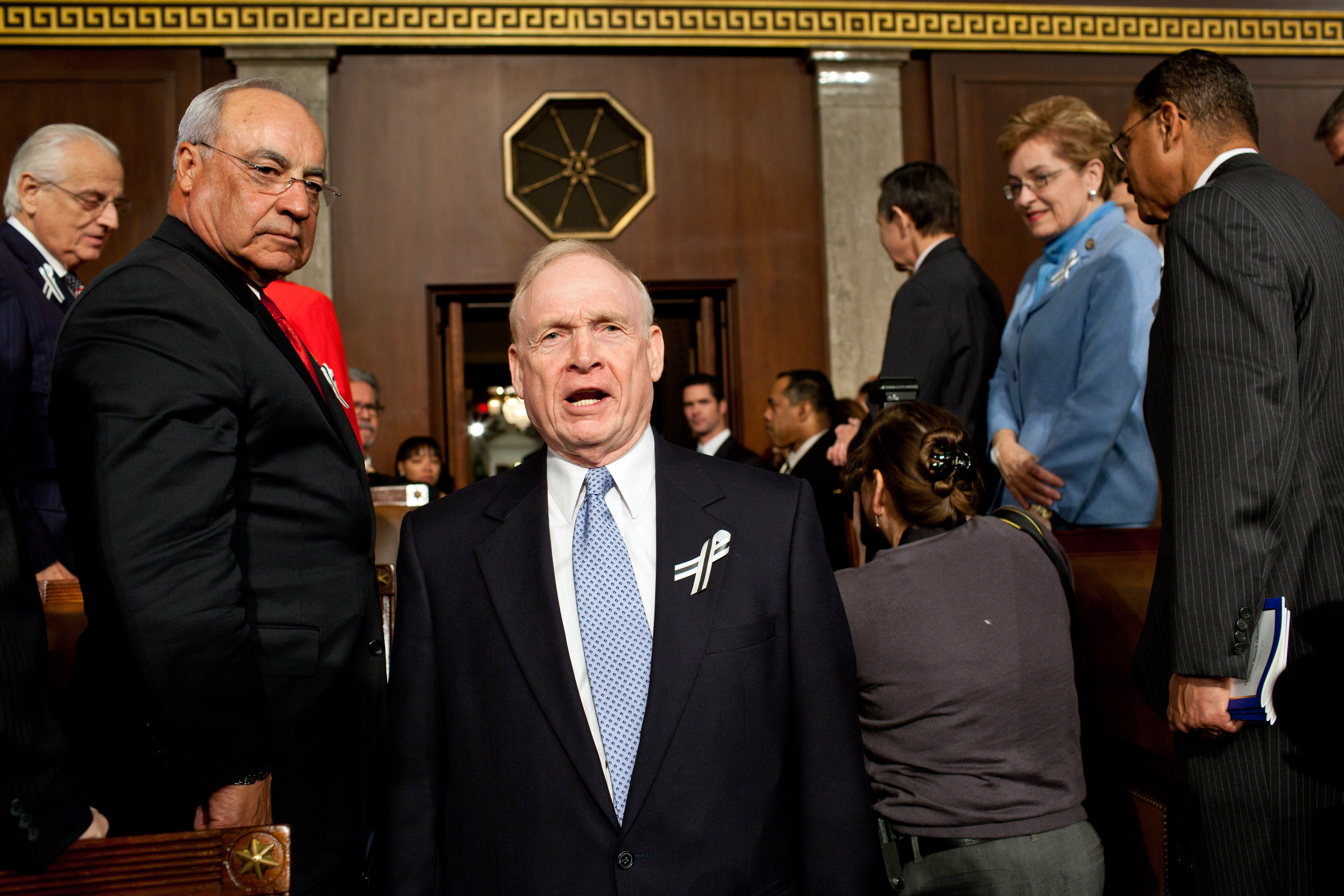
Sergeant at Arms Wilson "Bill" Livingood announces President Barack Obama at the 2011 State of the Union.

Through custom and precedent, the sergeant at arms performs a number of protocol and ceremonial duties. These duties include leading formal processions at ceremonies such as presidential inaugurations, joint sessions of Congress (such as the State of the Union address, prior to 2007), formal addresses to the Congress, greeting and escorting visiting foreign dignitaries, conveying articles of impeachment from the House to the Senate, and to supervise congressional funeral arrangements. In this capacity, the sergeant at arms is most famous for announcing the arrival of the president, a responsibility that he took over from the doorkeeper of the United States House of Representatives when the latter position was abolished in 1995. Custom dictates that he announce the arrival of the Supreme Court, the president's cabinet, and finally the president by proclaiming, "Mister (or Madam) Speaker, the President of the United States!"

=== Unruliness ===
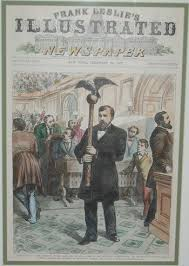
John G. Thompson, sergeant at arms House of Representatives from Dec. 1875 to Dec 1881, holding the mace

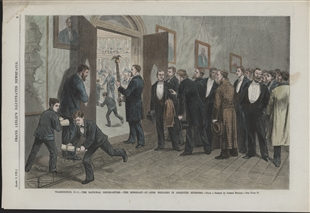
John G. Thompson, sergeant at arms from Dec. 1875 to Dec 1881, holding the mace

For daily sessions of the House, the sergeant at arms carries the silver and ebony mace of the United States House of Representatives in front of the speaker in procession to the rostrum. When the House is in session, the mace stands on a pedestal to the speaker's own right. When the body resolves itself into a Committee of the Whole House on the State of the Union, the sergeant at arms moves the mace to a lowered position, more or less out of sight. In accordance with the Rules of the House, on the rare occasions when a member becomes unruly, the sergeant at arms, on order of the speaker, lifts the mace from its pedestal and presents it before the offenders, thereby restoring order.

=== Other ===
The sergeant at arms also performs administrative services in support of the members, staff, and visitors associated with the security and other operations of the House.

If a quorum is not present, those representatives who are present may vote to order the sergeant at arms to try to round up absent representatives.

In addition to serving on the Capitol Police Board, the sergeant at arms served with the Senate sergeant at arms and the Architect of the Capitol on the Capitol Guide Board. This board oversaw the Capitol Guide Service, which provided tours of the Capitol to visitors and special services to tourists.

== Deputy sergeants at arms ==
The deputy sergeants at arms act as assistants to the sergeant at arms. The sergeant at arms has the duty of making the important decisions under their power, while the deputy sergeant at arms often executes the decisions. The deputy sergeant at arms that served under Paul Irving was Timothy Blodgett. The current Deputy Sergeant at Arms is Sean Keating.

== List of sergeants at arms ==
No.	Image	Sergeant at Arms	State or territory	Term of service	Congress
1		Joseph Wheaton	Rhode Island	May 12, 1789 – October 27, 1807	1st – 9th
2		Thomas Dunn	Maryland	October 27, 1807 – December 5, 1824	10th – 18th
3		John O. Dunn	District of Columbia	December 6, 1824 – December 3, 1833	18th – 22nd
4		Thomas Beverly Randolph	Virginia	December 3, 1833 – December 15, 1835	23rd – 24th
5		Roderick Dorsey	Maryland	December 15, 1835 – June 8, 1841	24th – 27th
6		Eleazor M. Townsend	Connecticut	June 8, 1841 – December 7, 1843	27th – 28th
7		Newton Lane	Kentucky	December 7, 1843 – December 8, 1847	28th – 30th
8		Nathan Sargent	Vermont	December 8, 1847 – January 15, 1850	30th – 31st
9		Adam J. Glossbrenner	Pennsylvania	January 15, 1850 – February 3, 1860	31st – 36th
10		Henry William Hoffman	Maryland	February 3, 1860 – July 5, 1861	36th – 37th
11		Edward Ball	Ohio	July 5, 1861 – December 8, 1863	37th – 38th
12		Nehemiah G. Ordway	New Hampshire	December 8, 1863 – December 6, 1875	38th – 43rd
13		John G. Thompson	Ohio	December 6, 1875 – December 5, 1881	44th – 46th
14		George W. Hooker	Vermont	December 5, 1881 – December 4, 1883	47th
15		John P. Leedom	Ohio	December 4, 1883 – December 2, 1889	48th – 50th
16		Adoniram J. Holmes	Iowa	December 2, 1889 – December 8, 1891	51st
17		Samuel S. Yoder	Ohio	December 8, 1891 – August 7, 1893	52nd
18		Herman W. Snow	Illinois	August 7, 1893 – December 2, 1895	53rd
19		Benjamin F. Russell	Missouri	December 2, 1895 – December 4, 1899	54th – 55th
20		Henry Casson	Wisconsin	December 4, 1899 – April 4, 1911	56th – 61st
21		Uriah Stokes Jackson	Indiana	April 4, 1911 – June 22, 1912	62nd
22		Charles F. Riddell	Indiana	July 18, 1912 – April 7, 1913	62nd
23		Robert B. Gordon	Ohio	April 7, 1913 – May 19, 1919	63rd – 65th
24		Joseph G. Rodgers	Pennsylvania	May 19, 1919 – December 7, 1931	66th – 71st
25		Kenneth Romney	Montana	December 7, 1931 – January 3, 1947	72nd – 79th
26a		William F. Russell	Pennsylvania	January 3, 1947 – January 3, 1949	80th
27		Joseph H. Callahan	Kentucky	January 3, 1949 – January 3, 1953	81st – 82nd
26b		William F. Russell	Pennsylvania	January 3, 1953 – July 7, 1953	83rd
28		Lyle O. Snader	Illinois	July 8, 1953 – September 15, 1953	83rd
29		William R. Bonsell	Pennsylvania	September 15, 1953 – January 5, 1955	83rd
30		Zeake W. Johnson Jr.	Tennessee	January 5, 1955 – September 30, 1972	84th – 92nd
31		Kenneth R. Harding	Virginia	October 1, 1972 – February 29, 1980	92nd – 96th
32		Benjamin J. Guthrie	Virginia	March 1, 1980 – January 3, 1983	96th – 97th
33		Jack Russ	Maryland	January 3, 1983 – March 12, 1992	98th – 102nd
34		Werner W. Brandt	Virginia	March 12, 1992 – January 4, 1995	102nd – 103rd
35		Wilson Livingood	Virginia	January 4, 1995 – January 17, 2012	104th – 112th
36		Paul D. Irving	Florida	January 17, 2012 – January 7, 2021	112th – 117th
–		Timothy Blodgett (acting)	New York	January 11, 2021 – March 26, 2021	117th
37		William J. Walker	Illinois	March 26, 2021 – January 7, 2023	117th
38		William McFarland	Maryland	January 7, 2023 – present	118th

== See also ==
- Sergeant at Arms of the United States Senate
- Serjeant-at-arms
