= 231st Combat Communications Squadron =

Air National Guard unit of Washington, D.C.

The 231st Combat Communications Squadron, District of Columbia Air National Guard, was a tenant unit of the 113th Wing based at Andrews Air Force Base, Maryland, United States.

The squadron used traditional military communications systems such as the Defense Switch Network (DSN), the Automated Digital Network (AUTODIN), and Defense Messaging System (DMS), as well as off-the-shelf commercial communications systems.

== Unit history ==
The 231st began on 1 February 1952, when the 8205th Air Base Squadron was activated. The unit's mission was to receive, maintain, and store equipment as well as provide trained personnel for the soon-to-be formed 231st Airways and Air Communications Service (AACS) Squadron (Mobile) which was to be stationed at Camp Simms, Washington, D.C.). The unit was inactivated on 26 August 1952, when its personnel and equipment were transferred to the 231st AACS Sq (Mobile).

=== Vietnam era ===
On 1 July 1961, the 231st AACS Sq (Mobile) was renamed the 231st Mobile Communications Squadron. The unit kept this name until January 1966, when the unit became the 231st Mobile Communications Squadron (Bare Base). A separate 231st Flight Facilities Flight (FFF) assumed air traffic control functions.

In 1968, the words "Bare Base" were removed from the Squadron designation, and the unit mobilized for the Pueblo Crisis. Activated for two weeks, the 231st was demobilized on 17 April of that year.

In 1969, the 231st saw its first change of command when Lt. Col. Tuckerman retired and was replaced by Maj. Charles Milton. Tuckerman's 17 years as commanding officer was the longest of any commander in the history of the 231st.

By 1971, the 231st had a role in both federal and state support with its participation in the DC National Guard's Task Force Blue. This mission enabled the 231st to provide civil support to the District of Columbia during times of civil disturbance or to aid the Metropolitan Police Department by being deputized for other events. The 231st took part in various civil missions, including the 1961 Nikita Khrushchev visit to the United States, the 1963 Civil Rights March.

In 1972, the Flight Facilities Flight was merged into the 231st, and on 8 December 1972 the unit was inactivated and returned to the National Guard Bureau. The unit was renamed the 231st Mobile Communications Squadron (Tactical Air Base) to reflect its standalone capability.

=== Cold War era ===
In May 1976, the word "Mobile" was replaced by "Combat" in the Squadron's official designation. That year saw another change to the Squadron's operations as it began to move from its 25-acre (100,000 m^{2}) home at Camp Simms to Andrews Air Force Base. The buildings to be occupied by the 231st began construction in July 1976, and they were completed by August 1978.

The unit accomplished its first overseas deployment in 1981 when members of the squadron participated at Exercise Flintlock 81 in England.

The 231st provided the Air National Guard's first radar approach control operations in 1983 at Martinsburg, and it also pioneered the Air Guard's first airspace surveillance support to Camp David beginning in 1983. In 1985, the unit was renamed the 231st Combat Information Systems Squadron. In October 1986, it was renamed again, getting its current designation, the 231st Combat Communications Squadron.

At the end of the Cold War the unit began a new era of operations with Operations Desert Shield and Storm.

During Operational Display Determination in 1991, the unit deployed 20 members to Turkey to support humanitarian assistance to the Kurds in Northern Iraq. In 1999 the unit again responded when the squadron received a Presidential Selective Reserve Call-Up (PSRC) for operations in the NATO Bosnia and Kosovo Campaigns.

=== Twenty-first century ===
During the terrorist attacks on September 11, 2001, the unit was active in setting up a static ground communications system to support the 113th Wing's airfield operations in establishing combat air patrols over the nation's capital.

In January 2003 the unit was called by the 1st Air Force to provide communications command and control in support of the Integrated Air Defense (IAD) of the National Capital Region during the 2003 Presidential State of the Union Address.

Twenty personnel from the unit volunteered to pack up 60 short tons of equipment to support Operations Enduring Freedom and Iraqi Freedom. Three members of the unit were deployed into the combat theater during Operation Iraqi Freedom, while another 12 personnel worked at the Air National Guard's Crisis Action Team from 2001 to 2004 in support of Operation Noble Eagle.

In 2004, the unit began to receive the new Theatre Deployable Communications gear, technology designed to transmit and receive communications anywhere in the world. The system is designed to reduce the communication problems normally associated with airlift and manpower.

During Hurricane Isabel in October 2003, the unit provided equipment to the 911 Emergency Response Center in Baltimore. This was the first time that the DC Air National Guard had provided equipment support outside of the District to another State.

During Hurricane Katrina in September 2005, members of the unit deployed to New Orleans and Pineville, LA to provide communications in support of recovery efforts.

In 2007, the 231st Combat Communications Squadron was designated for inactivation, effective March 2008. During its lifetime, the 231st won 5 Air Force Outstanding Unit Awards.
