= Paul D. Irving =

American law enforcement officer (born 1957)

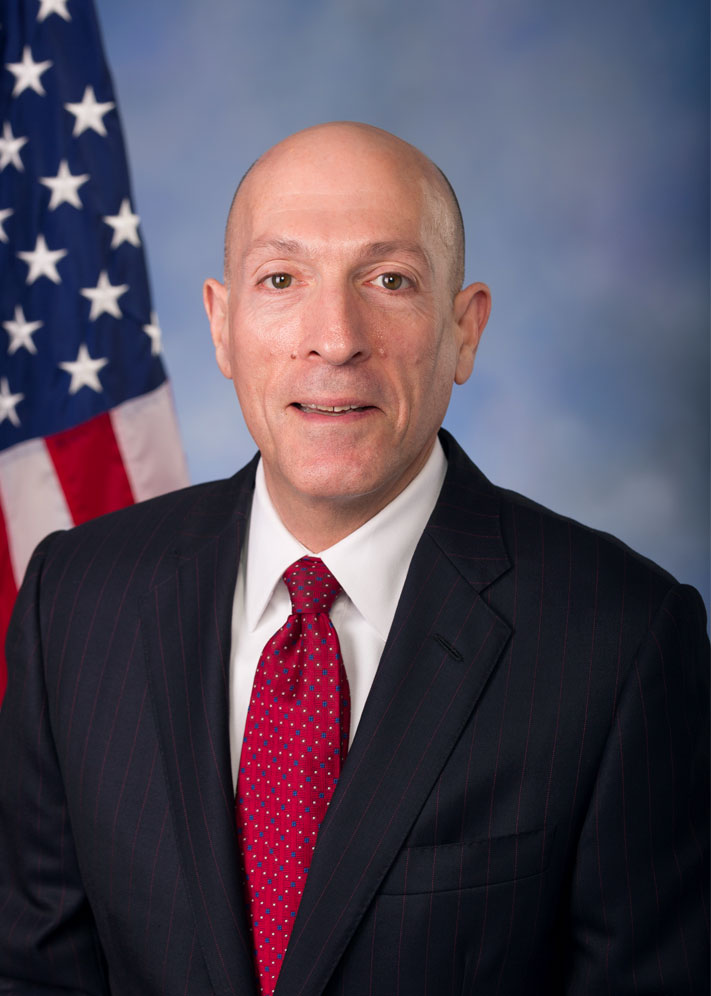
- Official portrait, 2012

36th Sergeant at Arms of the United States House of Representatives
- In office January 17, 2012 – January 7, 2021
- Leader: John Boehner; Paul Ryan; Nancy Pelosi
- Preceded by: Wilson Livingood
- Succeeded by: Timothy Blodgett (acting)

Personal details
- Born: Paul Douglas Irving; August 1957 (age 69) Tampa, Florida, U.S.
- Spouse: Jean Parkinson (m. 1989–2014)
- Education: American University (BA); Whittier Law School (JD)

Paul Douglas Irving (born August 1957) is an American former law enforcement officer who served as the Sergeant at Arms of the United States House of Representatives from January 17, 2012, until January 7, 2021, succeeding Wilson Livingood in that post. He resigned due to his inability to fulfill his duty during the January 6 United States Capitol attack.

== Early life and education ==
Irving was born in Tampa, Florida, in 1957. In 1979, Irving earned a bachelor's degree in justice from American University. In 1982, he earned a J.D. degree from Whittier Law School.

== Career ==
From 1980 to 1983, Irving served as a clerk in the Federal Bureau of Investigation's Los Angeles field office.

In 1983, Irving joined the United States Secret Service, where he served as a supervisory agent in the Presidential Protection Division, as Deputy Assistant Director for Congressional Affairs, and as Assistant Director for Administration.

In 2003, Irving was assigned to the Executive Office of the President at the White House during the Secret Service's transition to the United States Department of Homeland Security. Irving retired from the Secret Service in 2008.

Following his retirement from the Secret Service, Irving became president and managing partner of his family's real estate investment firm, and subsequently joined Command Consulting Group, an international security and intelligence consulting firm, where he was a senior security consultant in the firm's Washington, D.C. headquarters, and managing director of the firm's office in Miami, Florida.

On January 17, 2012, Irving was named the House Sergeant at Arms. Irving rose to prominence after the January 6 United States Capitol attack.

=== Responding to the 2021 Capitol attack ===
On January 4, Capitol Police chief Steven Sund requested additional D.C. National Guard support from Irving and Senate Sergeant-at-Arms Michael C. Stenger. That request was denied. Sund claims Irving's refusal cited concerns about "optics", though Irving disputes this claim.

On January 6 at around 1:00 p.m., hundreds of Trump supporters clashed with officers and pushed through barriers along the perimeter of the Capitol. The crowd swept past barriers and officers, with some members of the mob spraying officers with chemical agents or hitting them with lead pipes. Representative Zoe Lofgren (D–CA), aware that rioters had reached the Capitol steps, was unable to reach Capitol police chief Steven Sund by phone; Irving told Lofgren the doors to the Capitol were locked and "nobody can get in".

At 1:09, Sund called Irving and Stenger and asked them for an emergency declaration required to call in the D.C. National Guard; they both told Sund they would "run it up the chain". Irving called back with formal approval an hour later. Irving would later deny the 1:09 p.m. conversation took place, though the call was substantiated by phone records.

On January 7, 2021, House Speaker Nancy Pelosi announced that Irving would be submitting his resignation as Sergeant at Arms. Sund and Stenger also resigned from their posts.

U.S. House of Representatives
Preceded by Wilson Livingood	36th Sergeant at Arms of the United States House of Representatives; 2012–2021	Succeeded by Timothy Blodgett; Acting
