= Japan Casino Regulatory Commission =

- カジノ管理委員会
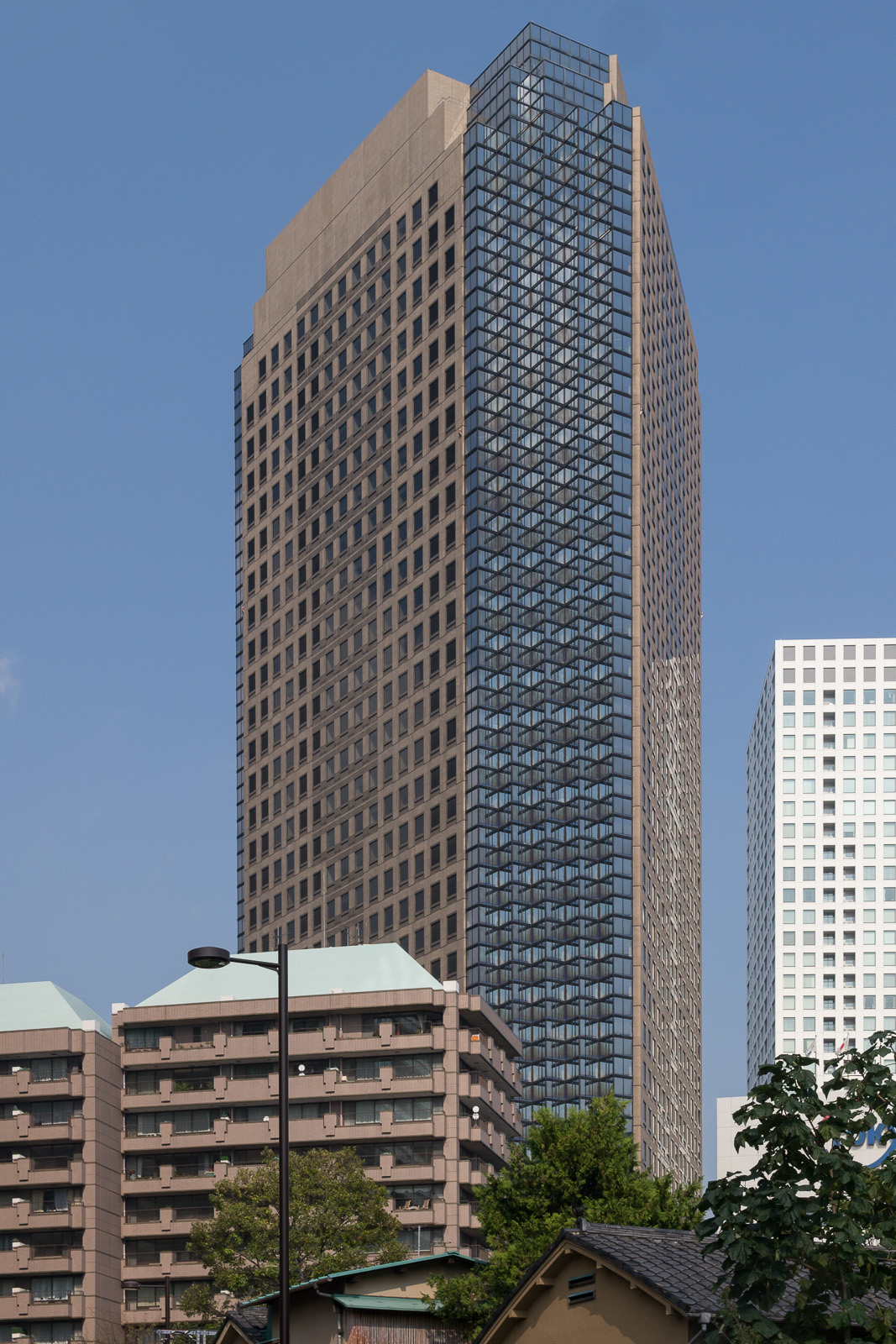
- JCRC Headquarters

Agency overview
- Formed: January 7, 2020
- Jurisdiction: Japan
- Headquarters: 4-3-1 Toranomon, Minato-ku, Tokyo Shiroyama Trust Tower 12th and 13th floors
- Parent agency: Cabinet Office
- Website: www.jcrc.go.jp/index.html (in Japanese)

Japan Casino Regulatory Commission (カジノ管理委員会; JCRC) Is a Japanese government agency. It is a collegial administrative committee established under the jurisdiction of the Prime Minister as an external bureau of the Cabinet Office.

JCRC was established on January 7, 2020.

== Internal organization ==
- Casino Regulatory Commission
  - Chairman (appointed by the Prime Minister with Consent of National Diet. Salary is equivalent to Parliamentary Secretary)
  - Committee members (4 members, 2 of whom are part-time. Both are appointed by the Prime Minister with the consent of both Houses.)
- Secretariat
  - executive director
  - Deputy Secretary General
    - Inspector General
    - General Affairs Planning Department
      - General Affairs Division
      - Dependence Countermeasures Division
      - Planning Division
      - Official Document Manager
    - Supervisory Investigation Department
      - Investigation Division
      - Regulatory Supervision Division
      - Financial Supervision Division

== See also ==
- Ministries of Japan
