= Willard W. Millikan =

US Air Force officer (1918–1978)

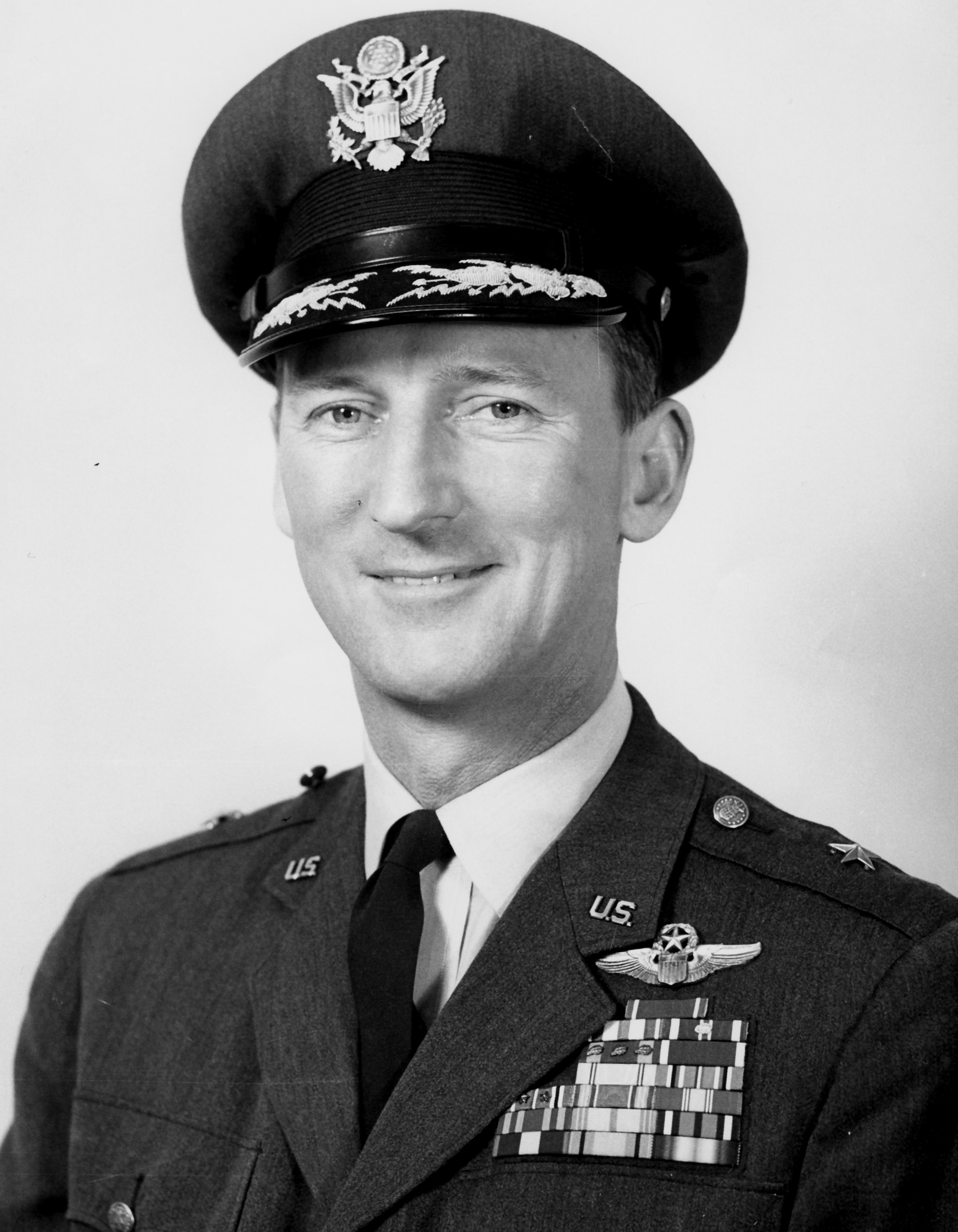
- Born: December 4, 1918; Hamburg, Iowa, U.S.
- Died: October 20, 1978 (aged 59); Alexandria, Virginia, U.S.
- Military career
- Allegiance: United Kingdom; United States of America
- Branch: Royal Air Force; United States Army Air Forces; United States Air Force
- Service years: 1941–1969
- Rank: Major General
- Nickname: "Millie"
- Units: No. 133 Squadron RAF; 4th Fighter Group
- Commands: 339th Fighter Squadron; 121st Fighter Squadron; 33rd Fighter Interceptor Group; 113th Fighter Interceptor Wing; 833rd Air Division
- Conflicts: World War II
- Awards: Distinguished Service Cross; Silver Star; Legion of Merit; Distinguished Flying Cross (6); Purple Heart; Air Medal (4)

Willard Wesley Millikan (December 4, 1918 - October 20, 1978) was a United States Air Force Major General and a flying ace, who was credited with destroying 13 enemy aircraft in aerial combat during World War II. He retired in 1969, after 28 years of distinguished service.

== Early life ==
Millikan was born in 1918 at Hamburg, Iowa, the second of five children of John Reily Millikan and Hattie Mae Moore Millikan. After graduating from high school, he attended at the Nebraska State Teachers College in Peru, Nebraska.

== Military career ==
In 1941, he enlisted in the U.S. Army Air Corps as an aviation cadet at Fort Leavenworth in Kansas. He served as an aviation cadet until October 1941, when he accepted a discharge after failing to pass flight checks. He enlisted in the Royal Air Force at Tulsa, Oklahoma, where he earned his pilot wings and was assigned as a Flying Sergeant. Stationed in England, he flew combat missions in Hawker Hurricane and Supermarine Spitfire fighters with the No. 133 Squadron.

=== World War II ===
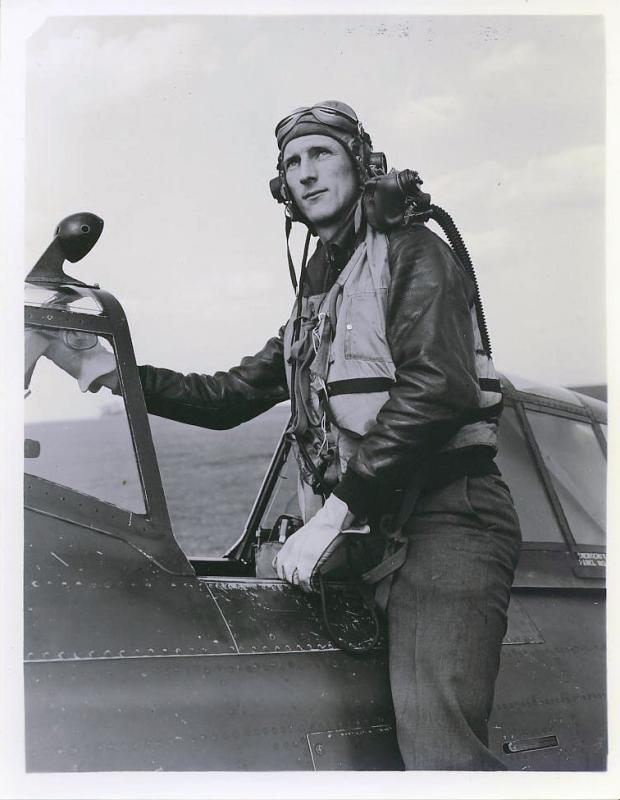
Millikan onboard his P-47 Thunderbolt

After the United States entry into World War II, Millikan was transferred to the U.S. Army Air Forces and commissioned as a second lieutenant in October 1942. In February 1943, he joined the 4th Fighter Group at RAF Debden in England. Flying the P-47 Thunderbolt, he scored his first aerial victory on September 27, 1943, when he shot down a Focke-Wulf Fw 190. He scored further two more victories in the P-47 in December 20, 1943 and February 10, 1944, before the 4th FG converted into North American P-51 Mustangs.

While flying the P-51s, he scored his fourth aerial victory on March 3, 1944. On April 8, 1944, while leading a bomber escort mission over Uelzen, Germany, he led his flight in attacking a formation of 100 German fighters that attempted to intercept the bombers. In the subsequent air battle, Millikan shot down three Messerschmitt Bf 109s and managed to disperse the remaining large flight of enemy fighters. With a total of seven aerial victories, he became a flying ace and received the Distinguished Service Cross for his heroism in the mission.

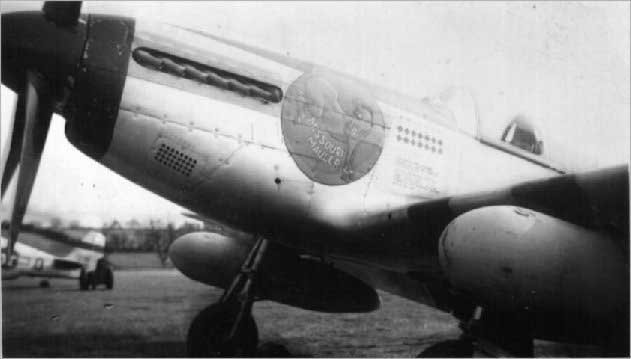
Millikan's P-51B VF-U 'Missouri Mauler'

Progressing from second lieutenant to captain, he became commander of the 336th Fighter Squadron of the 4th Fighter Group in April 1944. On April 19, 1944, he shot down a Bf 109 over Eschwege, his eighth aerial victory. On April 22, he shot down four Bf 109s during a bomber escort over Sachsenhausen, for which he received the Silver Star. On May 22, 1944, he shot down a Bf 109 over Kiel, his 13th and last aerial victory.

On 30 May 1944, he was forced to bail out over Bernburg, Germany, after his P-51 collided with the P-51 of his wingman, Lieutenant Sam Young, who was evading anti-aircraft fire. Captured by Germans, Millikan was held as a prisoner of war until April 1945, when he escaped to friendly forces just before V-E Day in May 1945.

During World War II, Millikan flew over 200 combat missions and was credited with the destruction of 13 enemy aircraft in aerial combat, plus 2 destroyed on the ground while strafing enemy airfields. While serving with the 4th FG, he flew P-47C and P-51B bearing the name "Missouri Mauler".

=== Post war ===
Returning to the United States, he was released from active duty in January 1946 as a major.

He joined the District of Columbia Air National Guard as a captain in October 1946. Upgraded once more to the grade of major, he was appointed commander of the 121st Fighter Squadron in May 1948. Promoted to lieutenant colonel, he commanded the 121st when this unit was activated in February 1951 for Korean War service. In June 1951, he became commander of the 33rd Fighter Interceptor Group at Otis Air Force Base in Massachusetts. He later became Deputy for Operations of the 33rd Fighter Wing at Otis before his release from active duty in October 1952. He assumed command of the 113th Fighter Interceptor Wing (Air Guard) at Andrews Air Force Base in Maryland, on November 1, 1952.

On January 2, 1954, he established a new West to East speed record of four hours and six minutes flying a combat-equipped F-86F Sabre from Los Angeles International Airport to Floyd Bennett Field in New York, with one refueling stop at Offutt Air Force Base in Nebraska. He was a command pilot with more than 5,200 hours of fighter time, 1,500 of these in the F-100 Super Sabre.

On October 1, 1961, Millikan led the 113th Tactical Fighter Wing on active duty when it was federalized in the wake of the Berlin Crisis. The wing, composed of F-100 Super Sabres from Washington, D.C., New York and Colorado, performed with distinction during Swift Strike II, the largest Army and Air Force exercise since the end of World War II. He planned and led the first Air Guard fighter non-stop deployment, utilizing three aerial refuellings to Europe and back in August 1964, for which he received the Legion of Merit and a sixth Distinguished Flying Cross. He also led the unit during the 1968 Pueblo incident.

In April 1968, he was appointed as commander of the 833rd Air Division at Seymour Johnson Air Force Base in North Carolina, serving till his retirement from the Air Force in 1969, at the rank of major general.

== Later life ==
During his civilian life, he worked as director of the Eastern Regional Office of the Norair Division of the Northrop Corporation and as Washington representative of the Goodyear Tire and Rubber Company's aviation products division.

After he retired from the Air Force, Millikan worked as a government relations consultant and served on the Reserve Forces Policy Board. In 1970, he was named special assistant to the commander of the Tactical Air Command for the Air National Guard. Millikan was appointed Air National Guard special assistant to the commander-in-chief for U.S. Air Forces in Europe in 1977, a position he held till his final years.

Millikan died of heart attack on October 20, 1978, at his home in Alexandria, Virginia. He was cremated, and his ashes were scattered over England.

== Personal life ==
While stationed in England during World War II, Millikan married Ruby Samantha Wesson, with whom he would have a daughter named Patricia.

== Aerial victory credits ==
Date	#	Type	Aircraft flown	Unit assigned
27 September 1943	1	Fw 190	P-47C	336 FS, 4FG
20 December 1943	1	Bf 109	P-47C	336 FS, 4FG
10 February 1944	1	Fw 190	P-47C	336 FS, 4FG
3 March 1944	1	Bf 110	P-51B	336 FS, 4FG
8 April 1944	3	Bf 109	P-51B	336 FS, 4FG
19 April 1944	1	Bf 109	P-51B	336 FS, 4FG
22 April 1944	4	Bf 109	P-51B	336 FS, 4FG
22 May 1944	1	Bf 109	P-51B	336 FS, 4FG

SOURCES: Air Force Historical Study 85: USAF Credits for the Destruction of Enemy Aircraft, World War II

== Awards and decorations ==
During his lengthy career, Millikan earned many decorations, including:

USAF Command pilot badge
Distinguished Service Cross
Silver Star
Legion of Merit
Distinguished Flying Cross with silver oak leaf cluster
Purple Heart
Air Medal with three bronze oak leaf clusters
Air Force Presidential Unit Citation
Prisoner of War Medal (retroactive)
Combat Readiness Medal
American Defense Service Medal
American Campaign Medal
European-African-Middle Eastern Campaign Medal with two bronze campaign stars
World War II Victory Medal
National Defense Service Medal with bronze service star
Armed Forces Expeditionary Medal
Air Force Longevity Service Award
Armed Forces Reserve Medal
Defence Medal (United Kingdom)
Atlantic Star (United Kingdom)

- In 1987, an auditorium at Andrews Air Force Base was named Millikan Auditorium, in honor of him.

=== Distinguished Service Cross citation ===

Millikan, Willard W.
First Lieutenant, U.S. Army Air Forces
336th Fighter Squadron, 4th Fighter Group, Eighth Air force
Date of Action: April 8, 1944

Citation:

The President of the United States of America, authorized by Act of Congress July 9, 1918, takes pleasure in presenting the Distinguished Service Cross to First Lieutenant (Air Corps) Willard Wesley Millikan, United States Army Air Forces, for extraordinary heroism in connection with military operations against an armed enemy while serving as Pilot of a P-51 Fighter Airplane in the 366th Fighter Squadron, 4th Fighter Group, Eighth Air Force, in aerial combat against enemy forces on 8 April 1944, in the European Theater of Operations. On this date, First Lieutenant Millikan was leading a flight of four fighters on a bomber escort mission over Germany. In the area of Ulzen, Germany, approximately one hundred enemy fighters in three waves attempted to intercept the bombers. Despite the overwhelming odds against him, Lieutenant Millikan immediately led his flight in attack against the first wave, destroyed one and dispersed the others. During this action, one member of Lieutenant Millikan's flight was lost. Regardless of the enemy superiority he proceeded to intercept the second wave of enemy planes. En route he destroyed an enemy fighter airplane which was attacking a friendly fighter. Reforming his section, he began climbing for altitude to engage the enemy. Observing a friendly fighter being attacked, he viciously engaged the enemy airplane and forced the pilot to bail out after which he once more attacked and dispersed the remaining large flight of enemy planes. By his gallantry and determination to destroy the enemy Lieutenant Millikan rendered conspicuous and valorous service to our nation. First Lieutenant Millikan's unquestionable valor in aerial combat is in keeping with the highest traditions of the military service and reflects great credit upon himself, the 8th Air Force, and the United States Army Air Forces.
