= Lloyd W. Newton =

United States Air Force general

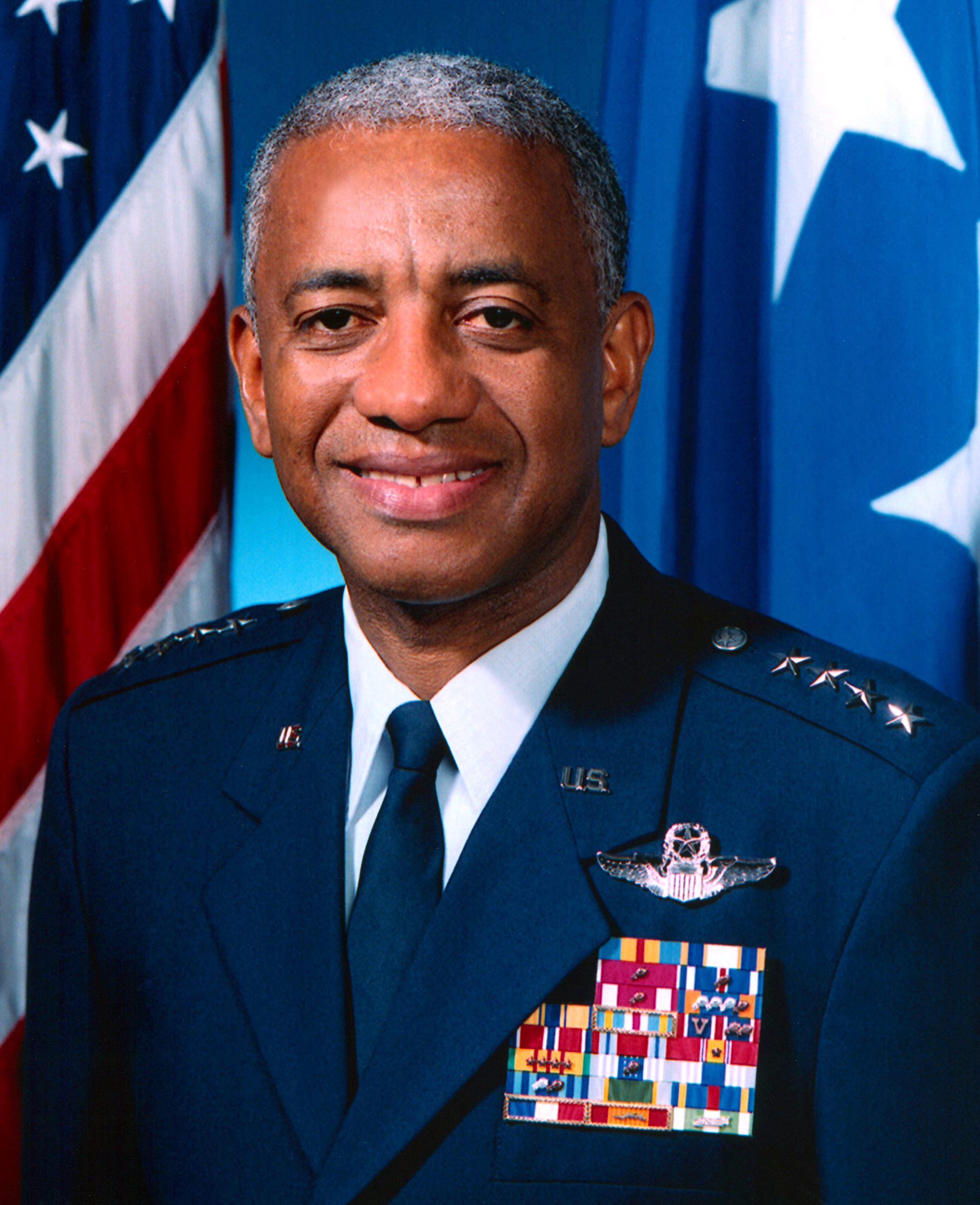
- General Lloyd W. "Fig" Newton
- Born: Lloyd Warren Newton; December 24, 1942 (age 83); Ridgeland, South Carolina, U.S.
- Military career
- Allegiance: United States of America
- Branch: United States Air Force
- Service years: 1966–2000
- Rank: General
- Nickname: Fig
- Commands: Air Education and Training Command; 49th Fighter Wing
- Conflicts: Vietnam War
- Awards: Legion of Merit (2); Distinguished Flying Cross (2); Air Medal (17)

Lloyd Warren "Fig" Newton (born December 24, 1942) is a retired United States Air Force (USAF) four-star general who served as Commander, Air Education and Training Command (COMAETC) from 1997 to 2000. He was also the first African-American pilot in the U.S. Air Force Thunderbirds.

Newton was born in Ridgeland, South Carolina, where he graduated from Jasper High School. He earned a Bachelor of Science degree in aviation education from Tennessee State University in Nashville, where he was commissioned as a distinguished graduate through the Air Force Reserve Officer Training Corps program in 1966.

After completing pilot training at Williams Air Force Base, Arizona, in June 1967, he attended F-4D Phantom qualification training at George Air Force Base, California. He flew 269 combat missions from Da Nang Air Base, South Vietnam, including 79 missions over North Vietnam. Newton was selected to join the USAF Air Demonstration Squadron, the Thunderbirds, in November 1974. He held several positions including narrator, slot pilot and right wingman. From 1978 to 1982 he was assigned as a USAF congressional liaison officer with the U.S. House of Representatives, Washington, D.C. He has commanded three wings and an air division, and held numerous staff positions. From 1993 to 1995 he was director of operations, J-3, United States Special Operations Command. Newton was a command pilot with more than 4,000 flying hours in the T-37, T-38, F-4, F-15, F-16, C-12 and F-117 stealth fighter.

In 2000 Newton joined Pratt & Whitney as the Vice President of Business Development (Military Engines), a position that he held until 2006.

== Personal ==
In 2008 Newton endorsed Barack Obama for president and appeared on stage at the Democratic National Convention at Invesco Field with other former military leaders to lend support to Obama's campaign.

In the 2024 United States presidential election, Newton endorsed Kamala Harris.

== Education ==
- 1966 Bachelor of Science degree in aviation education, Tennessee State University, Nashville
- 1978 Armed Forces Staff College, Norfolk, Virginia
- 1985 Industrial College of the Armed Forces, Washington, D.C.
- 1985 Master of Arts degree in public administration, George Washington University, Washington, D.C.
- 1987 National Security Senior Executives Course, Harvard University, Massachusetts

== Assignments and promotions ==
- Commissioned as a second lieutenant March 23, 1966
- June 1966 – June 1967, pilot training, Williams Air Force Base, Arizona
- June 1967 – April 1968, F-4D qualification training, George Air Force Base, California
  - Promoted to first lieutenant December 12, 1967
- April 1968 – April 1969, F-4D pilot and systems operator, Da Nang Air Base, South Vietnam
- April–November 1969, F-4D upgrade qualification training, George Air Force Base, California
  - Promoted to captain June 12, 1969
- November 1969 – November 1973, F-4D pilot, 523rd Tactical Fighter Squadron, Clark Air Base, Philippines
- November 1973 – November 1974, F-4D flight instructor pilot, Luke Air Force Base, Arizona
- November 1974 – February 1978, narrator and slot pilot, U.S. Air Force Thunderbirds, Nellis Air Force Base, Nevada
- February–June 1978, student, Armed Forces Staff College, Norfolk, Virginia
  - Promoted to major January 1, 1978
- June–December 1978, right wingman and narrator, U.S. Air Force Thunderbirds, Nellis Air Force Base, Nevada
- December 1978 – February 1982, congressional liaison officer, U.S. House of Representatives, Washington, D.C.
  - Promoted to lieutenant colonel October 1, 1980
- February–June 1982, F-16 qualification training, MacDill Air Force Base, Florida
- June 1982 – June 1983, assistant deputy commander for operations, 8th Tactical Fighter Wing, Kunsan Air Base, South Korea
- June 1983 – August 1984, assistant deputy commander for operations, 388th Tactical Fighter Wing, Hill Air Force Base, Utah
  - Promoted to colonel December 1, 1983
- August 1984 – August 1985, student, Industrial College of the Armed Forces, Washington, D.C.
- August 1985 – November 1986, assistant deputy director for operations and training, Headquarters U.S. Air Force, Washington, D.C.
- November 1986 – July 1988, assistant director of special projects, directorate of plans, Headquarters U.S. Air Force, Washington, D.C.
- July 1988 – May 1989, commander, 71st Air Base Group, Vance Air Force Base, Oklahoma
- May 1989 – May 1990, commander, 71st Flying Training Wing, Vance Air Force Base, Oklahoma
- May 1990 – August 1991, commander, 12th Flying Training Wing, Randolph Air Force Base, Texas
  - Promoted to brigadier general August 3, 1991
- August–November 1991, commander, 833rd Air Division, Holloman Air Force Base, New Mexico
- November 1991 – July 1993, commander, 49th Fighter Wing, Holloman Air Force Base, New Mexico
- July 1993 – May 1995, director of operations, J-3, United States Special Operations Command, MacDill Air Force Base, Florida
  - Promoted to major general August 10, 1993
  - Promoted to lieutenant general May 25, 1995
- June 1995 – March 1997, assistant vice chief of staff, Headquarters U.S. Air Force, Washington, D.C.
- March 1997 – 2000, commander, Headquarters Air Education and Training Command, Randolph Air Force Base, Texas
  - Promoted to general April 1, 1997

== Flight information ==
- Rating: Command pilot
- Flight hours: More than 4,000
- Aircraft flown: T-37, T-38, F-4, F-15, F-16, F-117 and C-12
- Pilot wings from: Williams Air Force Base, Arizona

== Major awards and decorations ==
- Defense Distinguished Service Medal
- Air Force Distinguished Service Medal with oak leaf cluster
- Legion of Merit with oak leaf cluster
- Distinguished Flying Cross with oak leaf cluster
- Meritorious Service Medal with oak leaf cluster
- Air Medal with 16 oak leaf clusters
- Air Force Commendation Medal
- Air Force Outstanding Unit Award with "V" device and two oak leaf clusters
- Vietnam Service Medal
- Philippine Presidential Unit Citation
- Republic of Vietnam Campaign Medal

== Other achievements ==
- 1997 Honorary doctorate in aeronautical science, Embry-Riddle Aeronautical University, Daytona Beach, Florida
- 1999 Honorary doctor of science degree, Benedict College, Columbia, South Carolina
- International Air and Space Hall of Fame (2018)
- Order of the Palmetto, presented by Governor Henry McMaster during a ceremony on July 12, 2023, at the statehouse in Columbia, South Carolina.
