= 113th Wing =

113th Wing

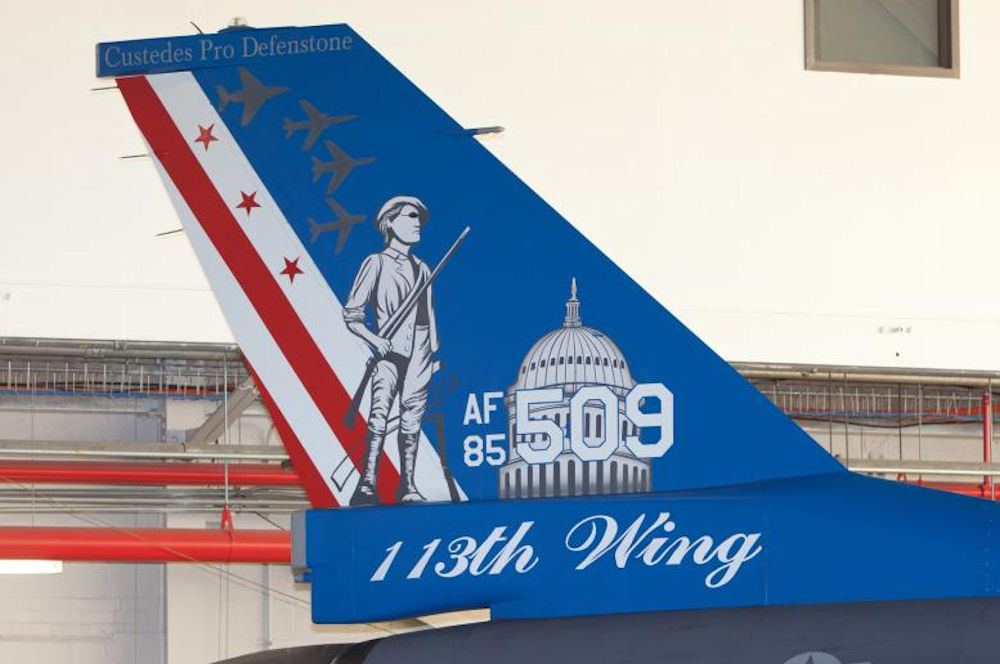
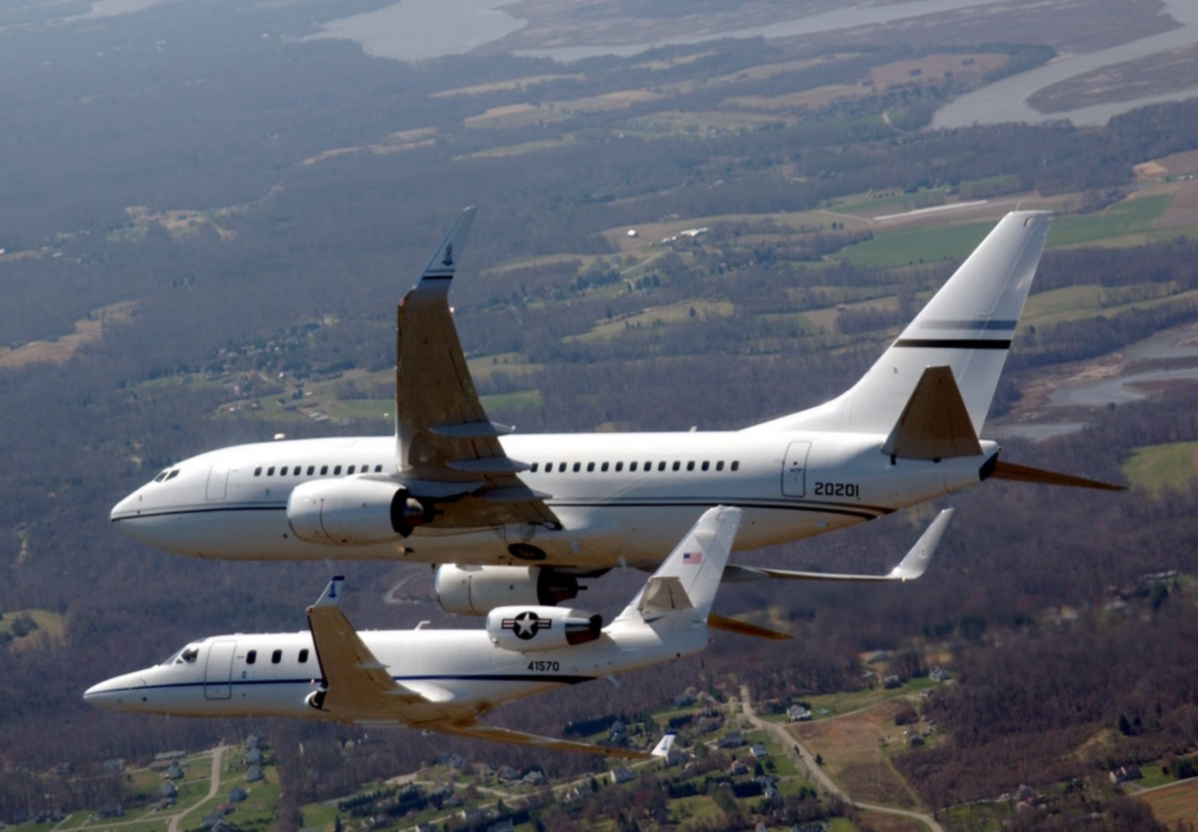
- 121st Fighter Squadron F-16 tail markings (Note: Aircraft is General Dynamics F-16D Fighting Falcon Block 30, serial 85-1509.) C-38A Courier (Note: Aircraft is Gulfstream C-38A Courier, serial 94-1570.) and a C-40C Clipper (Note: Aircraft is Boeing C-40C Clipper, serial 02-0201.) of the 201st Airlift Squadron
- Active: 1950–1952; 1952–present
- Country: United States
- Type: Composite unit
- Role: Fighter and airlift
- Size: 1,400
- Part of: District of Columbia Air National Guard
- Garrison/HQ: Joint Base Andrews, Maryland
- Nickname: Capital Guardians
- Motto: Custodes Pro Defensione (Latin for 'Guardians for Defense')
- Engagements: Gulf War; Iraq War: Operation Iraqi Freedom

Commanders
- Current commander: Brig. Gen. Matthew R. McDonough
- Deputy Commander: Col. Natasha S. Taylor
- Command Chief: CCM Lauren E. Williams
- Notable commanders: Maj. Gen. David F. Wherley Jr. Maj. Gen. Marc H. Sasseville; Maj. Gen. Willard W. Millikan

Insignia
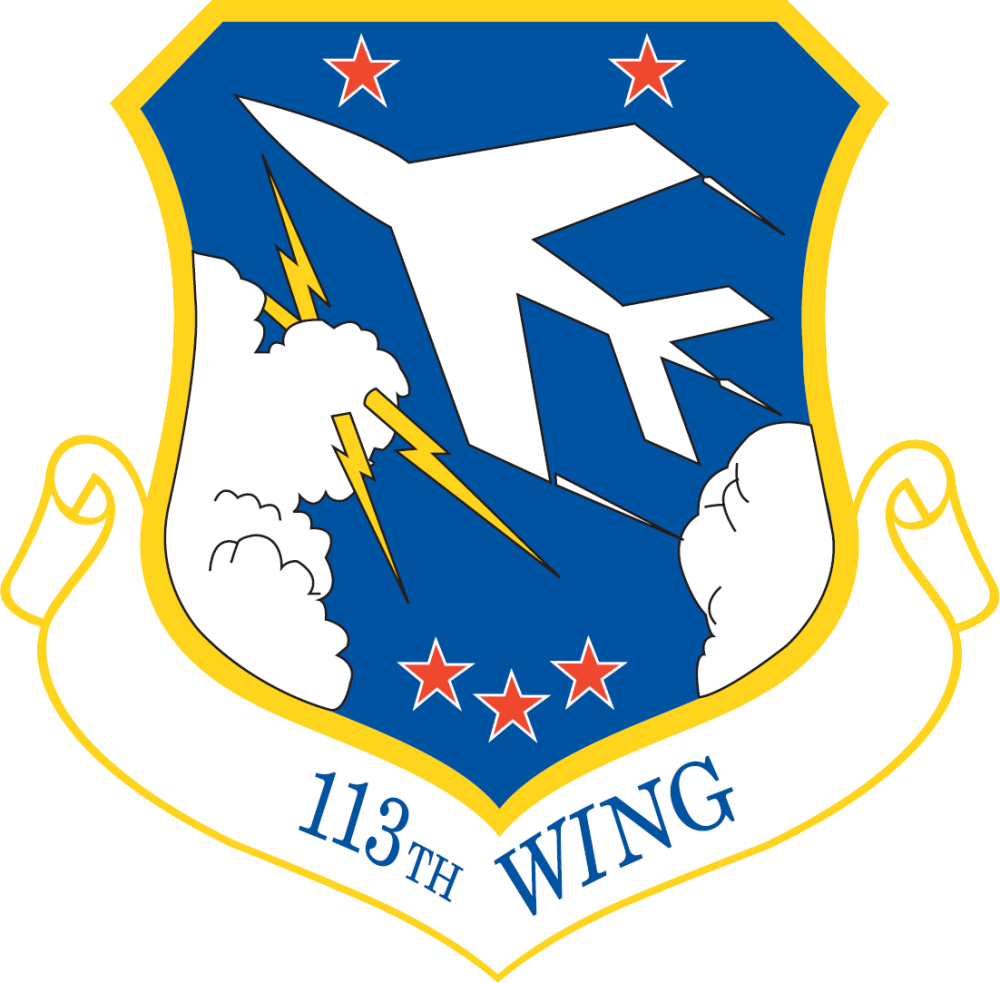
- 113th Wing emblem (Note: Approved 9 March 1954.)
- Tail code: DC
- Tail stripe: Red with stars

The 113th Wing, known as the "Capital Guardians", is a unit of the District of Columbia Air National Guard, stationed at Joint Base Andrews, Maryland. If activated to federal service, the fighter portion of the Wing is gained by the United States Air Force's Air Combat Command, while the airlift portion is gained by Air Mobility Command.

== Mission ==
The 113th's primary mission is training of air combat and operational airlift crews for national defense. The 113th also provides a ready response force of fighters for the defense of the District of Columbia area. Members of the 113th also assist local and federal law enforcement agencies in combating drug trafficking in the District of Columbia on a case by case basis.

The 121st Fighter Squadron, assigned to the wing's 113th Operations Group, is a descendant organization of the 121st Observation Squadron, established on 10 July 1940. It is one of the National Guard observation squadrons formed before World War II

== Units ==
The 113th Wing consists of the following major units:

- 113th Operations Group
  - 121st Fighter Squadron (F-16C/D Fighting Falcon)
  - 201st Airlift Squadron (C-40C)
  - 121st Weather Flight (Army Aviation Support)
  - 213th Maintenance Squadron
- 113th Maintenance Group
- 113th Mission Support Group
- 113th Medical Group

== History ==
=== Korean War activation ===
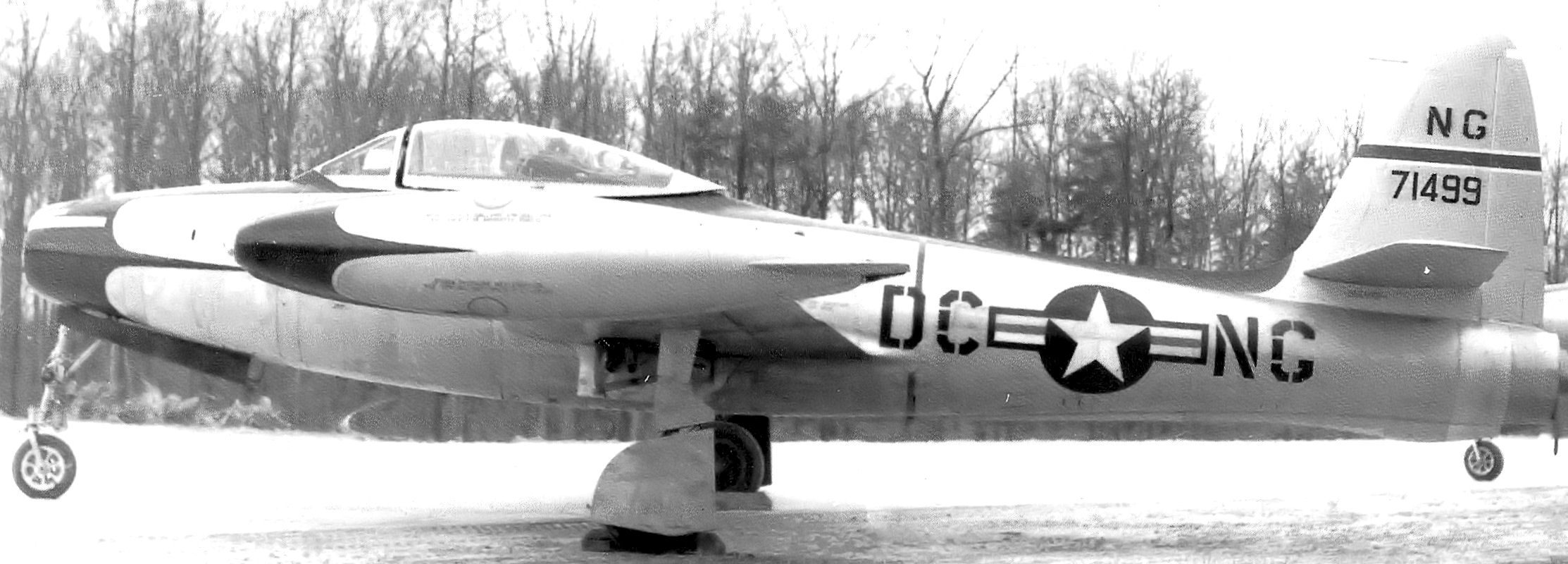
121st Fighter Squadron Republic F-84C Thunderjet 47-1499, about 1950

In the fall of 1950, the Air National Guard implemented the wing base organization ("Hobson Plan") used by the regular air force. The 113th Fighter Wing was formed as the headquarters for the 113th Fighter Group and its supporting units. With the surprise invasion of South Korea on 25 June 1950, and the regular military's lack of readiness, most of the Air National Guard was federalized and the 113th Wing was called to active duty on 1 February 1951. The wing was assigned to Air Defense Command (ADC) and was redesignated as the 113th Fighter-Interceptor Wing. Its 113th Fighter-Interceptor Group was composed of the District of Columbia Air National Guard 121st and Delaware Air National Guard 142d Fighter-Interceptor Squadrons, both equipped with Republic F-84C Thunderjets, along with the Pennsylvania Air National Guard North American F-51D Mustang equipped 148th Fighter Squadron From Spaatz Field, Reading.

On 20 March ADC redesignated the 113th Fighter Wing as the 113th Fighter-Interceptor Wing. The wing was moved from Andrews AFB to join with the 142nd FIS at Newcastle Air Force Base, Delaware. Its mission was the air defense of Delaware Bay and the Delmarva Peninsula.

In April 1951, with the 116th Fighter Squadron at Geiger AFB, Washington slated to switch to F-86As, the 113th FIG sent fifteen pilots to Geiger to obtain their F-84Cs for use by the 148th FIS. These aircraft were considered to be "so poor" that they were all flown to the 113th Maintenance Squadron, then at Dover AFB, Delaware for total refurbishment before they would be accepted by the 148th FIS.

In September 1951 the 113th FIW converted to F-94B Starfires with partial all-weather capabilities. During the six months the newly constituted 113th FIW was operational with the F-84C, each squadron had lost one example in an operational accident. Its federalization period ending, the 113th FIW was released from active duty and returned to District of Columbia control, 1 November 1952.

=== Cold War ===
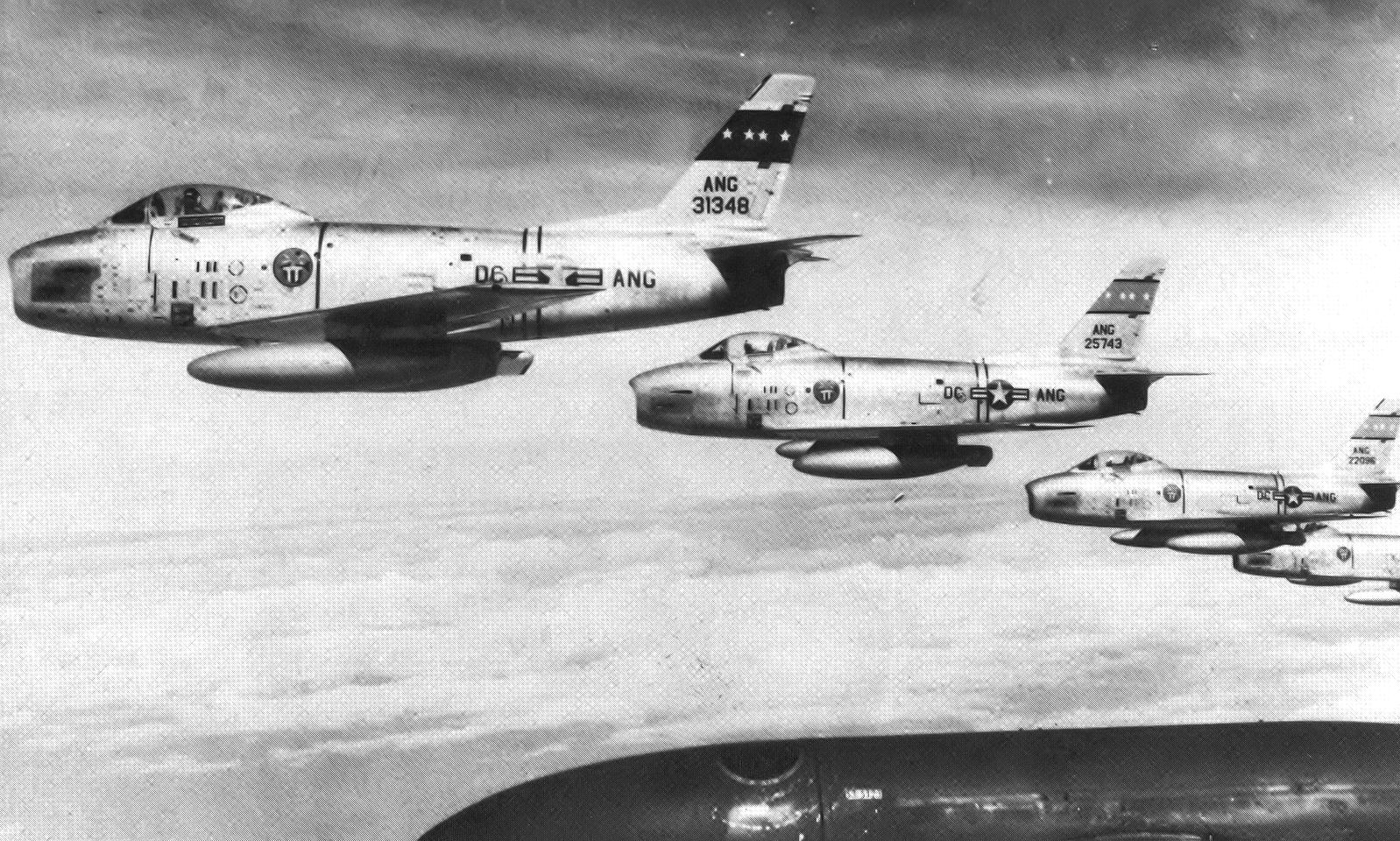
121st FIS 4-ship F-86H formation, 1960.

With its return to District of Columbia control, the 121st Fighter-Interceptor Squadron was re-equipped with propeller-driven F-51H Mustangs and resumed its air defense mission of Washington, D.C. It was not until 1954, with the phaseout of the Mustang and the requirement by ADC that its interceptor squadrons be equipped with jet-powered aircraft that the squadron was upgraded to postwar-era F-86A Sabres that had been refurbished and reconditioned before being received. In August 1954, the 121st began standing daytime air defense alert at Andrews, placing two aircraft at the end of the runway with pilots in the cockpit from one hour before sunrise until one hour after sunset. This ADC alert lasted each and every day until the end of October 1958

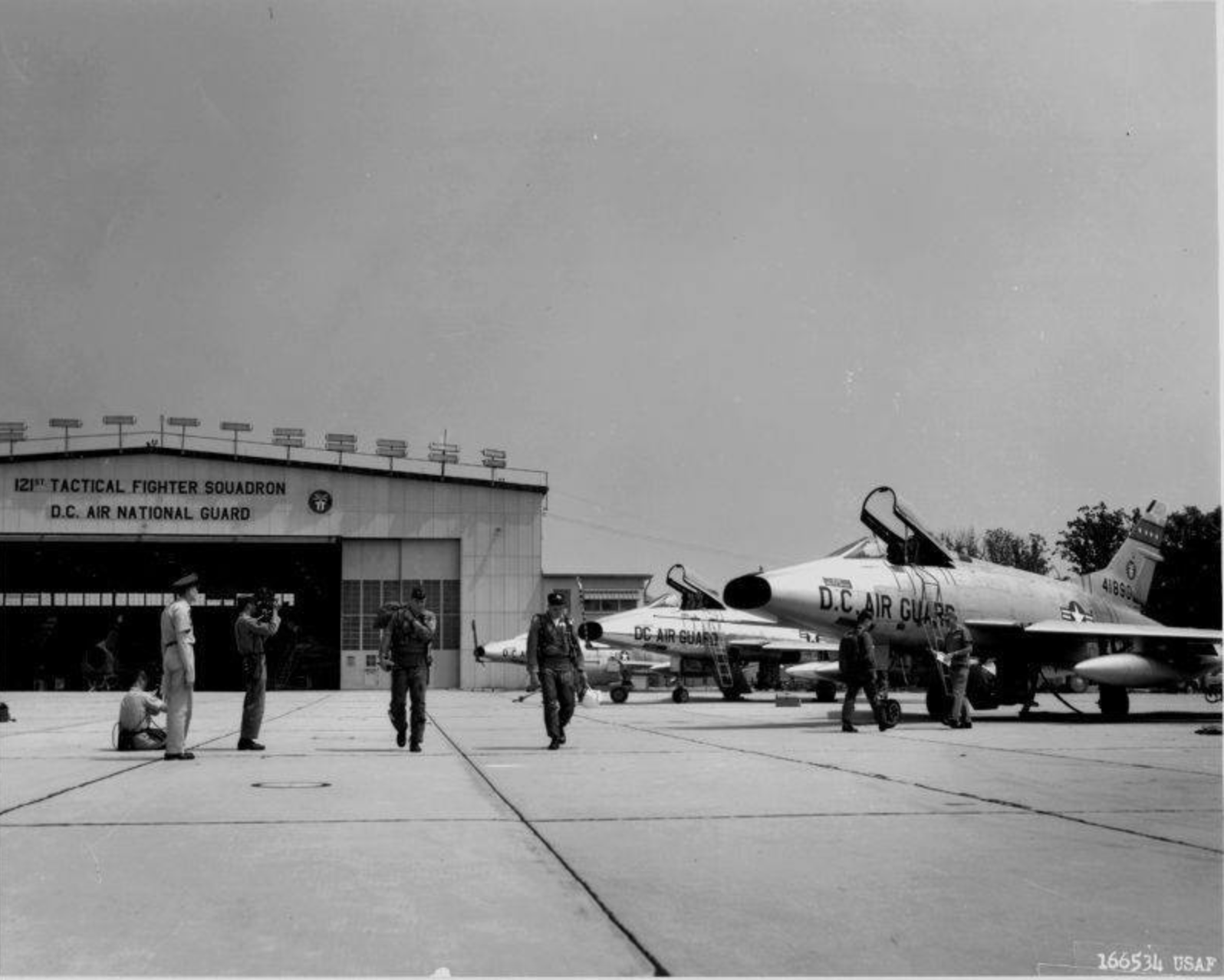
DC Air National Guard at Andrews Air Force Base (1961)

Despite the reconditioning, the F-86A Sabres were aging and required a considerable amount of maintenance to keep in the air. In 1955, the 113th sent them to storage at Davis-Monthan AFB and received F-86E Sabres from active-duty ADC units that were receiving F-89 Scorpion interceptors. In 1957, the F-86H was already being phased out of active service with the USAF, being replaced by the F-100 Super Sabre, and the 121st received F-86H Sabres in late 1957.

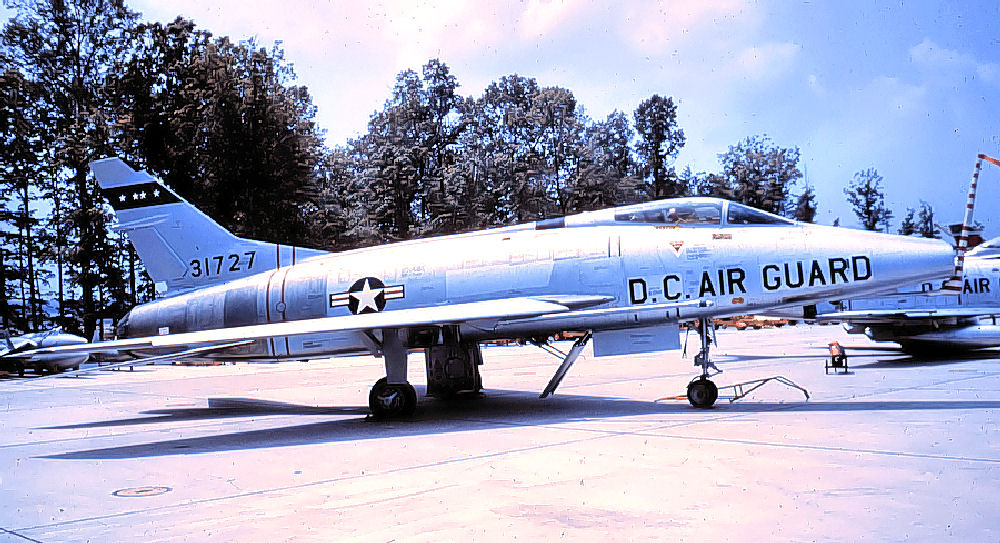
North American F-100C 53-1727 about 1965

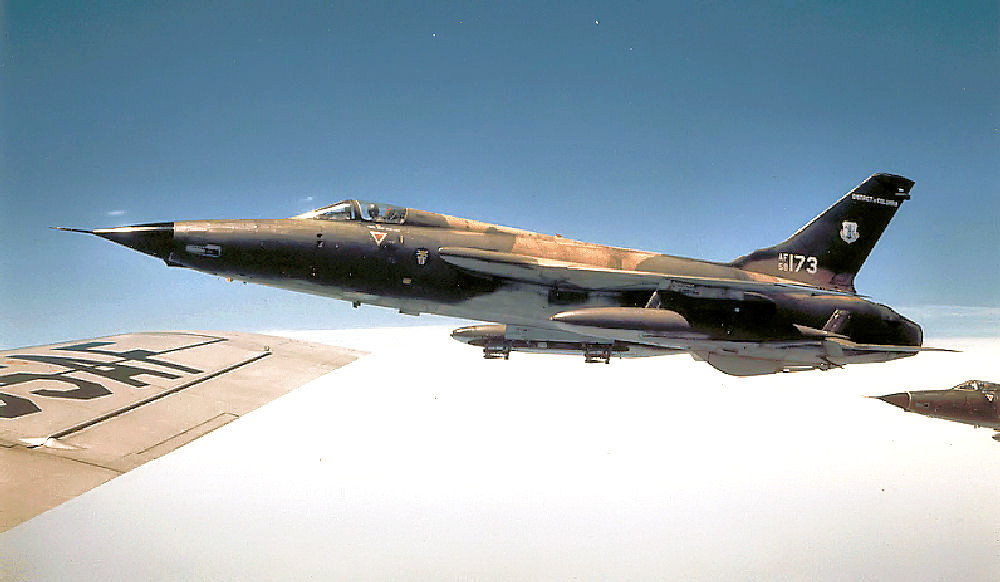
121st Tactical Fighter Squadron F-105D 58-1173 after an air refueling.

In late 1958, the gaining command for the 113th was changed from ADC to Tactical Air Command (TAC) and the mission of the wing was changed to tactical air support, although the air defense of Washington remained as a secondary mission. The Sabres were phased out in 1960 with the receipt of relatively new F-100C Super Sabres from active duty units receiving the F-100D model. The Super Sabre was a major improvement over the F-86H and it gave the wing a major increase in capability as well as it entering the supersonic age.

In January 1968, a new crisis, the seizure of the American ship USS Pueblo by North Korean forces, and again the 113th was called to active duty. The wing was activated to federal service, and its personnel were assigned to Myrtle Beach AFB, South Carolina as a filler unit while the base's permanent unit, the 354th Tactical Fighter Wing was deployed to Kunsan Air Base, South Korea. At Myrtle Beach AFB, the federalized NJ ANG 119th Tactical Fighter Squadron joined the 121st TFS on active duty. However, not all wing personnel were sent to Myrtle Beach, as personnel were spread throughout the United States, Taiwan, Korea, and South Vietnam.

The 113 TFW returned to Andrews AFB in June 1969, and transitioned into the F-105D Thunderchief (AKA "Thud") in 1971, receiving Vietnam War veteran aircraft that were being withdrawn from combat. The 113th was one of four Air National Guard units to receive the F-105, which was a very large and complex aircraft.

The 113th was fortunate to have many Vietnam Veteran airmen in its ranks by 1970, many of whom had F-105 experience. The Thud was the first USAF supersonic tactical fighter-bomber that was developed from scratch. All others before it were adaptations of aircraft that had originally been developed as pure fighters.

In December 1974, the 113th Tactical Fighter Group was inactivated, with the 121st TFS being assigned directly to the 113th Tactical Fighter Wing.

In 1981 at the end of its service life, the F-105s were retired, with the 113th TFW receiving F-4D Phantom IIs, again receiving Vietnam War veteran aircraft from active-duty units receiving F-15A and F-16A/B next-generation fighter aircraft. With the F-4, the 113th returned to the air defense mission, becoming part of Air Defense, Tactical Air Command (ADTAC), a named unit at the Numbered Air Force echelon of TAC. ADTAC had taken over the mission of Aerospace Defense Command in 1979 when the command was inactivated; the D.C. Air National Guard using the Phantoms for Washington, D.C. air defense.

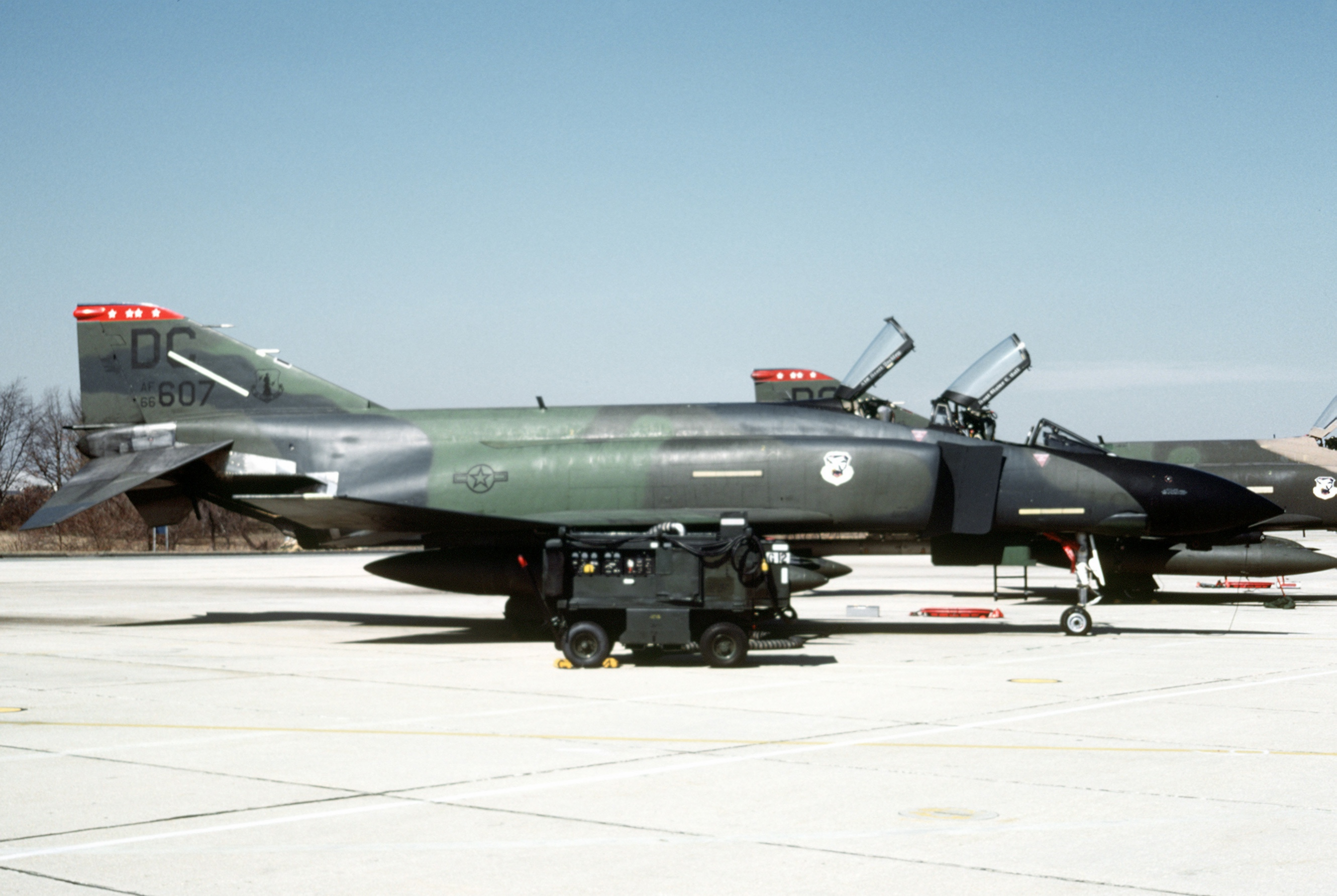
F-4D 66-7607 from the 121st Tactical Fighter Squadron, 1987

The 113th operated the Phantoms throughout the 1980s, retiring the Phantoms at the end of their service life in 1989. In turn, the 121st FS started receiving F-16A/B Fighting Falcons in September 1989. These were block 5 and 10 models coming from various regular USAF units converting to more modern F-16C/D models. The Wing retained its air defense and attack mission, however the early block 5 and 10 models really designed to do. In the air defense role these models lacked any BVR capability, limiting them only to close range combat with their gun and Sidewinder missiles. In the attack role these aircraft were able to deploy bombs, but with their smaller stabs the center of gravity of these aircraft was far from ideal making it quite a challenge for the pilots to fly these missions.

The 113th Tactical Fighter Wing was not mobilized during the 1991 Gulf Crisis, remaining in the United States with its air defense mission. D. C. Air National Guard volunteers, however were deployed to CENTAF during the crisis and subsequent combat operations as part of Operation Desert Storm.

=== Air Combat Command ===
After the collapse of the Soviet Union in 1990 and Operation Desert Storm, Air Force planners reorganized the major command structure and the organization of its units to reflect the new reality of the 1990s and also a smaller force after the end of the Cold War. Tactical Air Command was replaced by Air Combat Command (ACC) as the gaining command for the 113th effective 1 June 1992. On 15 March 1992, the 113th adopted the new Air Force Objective Organization, which re-designated the wing as the 113th Fighter Wing. The 113th Tactical Fighter Group was reactivated as the 113th Operations Group, and the 121st Fighter Squadron was transferred to the 113th OG. Other support groups under the Objective Wing organization are the 179th Maintenance Group, 179th Mission Support Group and the 179th Medical Group.

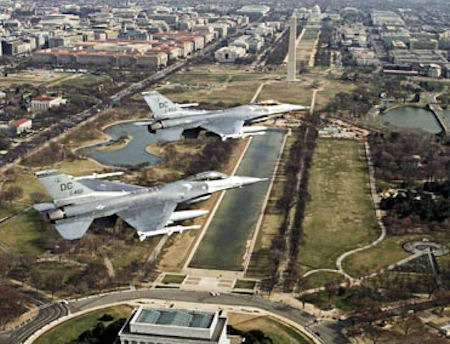
121st Fighter Squadron F-16s over Washington DC

On 20 June 1992, Detachment 1 HQ, District of Columbia Air National Guard was re-designated as the 201st Airlift Squadron, District of Columbia Air National Guard. The 201st Airlift Squadron provides short notice worldwide transportation for the Executive Branch, Congressional Members, Department of Defense officials and high-ranking U.S. and foreign dignitaries in support of the 89th Airlift Wing. The continuing efforts to upgrade and expand the squadron’s worldwide capabilities led to the acquisition of two C-38As in 1998 and two C-40Bs (Boeing 737) in 2002.

In 1994 the 121st traded its early F-16A/B aircraft for Block 30 F-16C/D Fighting Falcon which upgraded its capabilities considerably. In May 1996, the 121st Fighter Squadron deployed personnel and aircraft to Al Jaber Air Base, Kuwait to support Operation Southern Watch (OSW). The 121st FS was the first Air National Guard unit to fly OSW. Operation Southern Watch was an operation which was responsible for enforcing the United Nations mandated no-fly zone below the 32nd parallel north in Iraq. This mission was initiated mainly to cover for attacks of Iraqi forces on the Iraqi Shi’ite Muslims. In July 1996, the squadron returned to Andrews AFB.

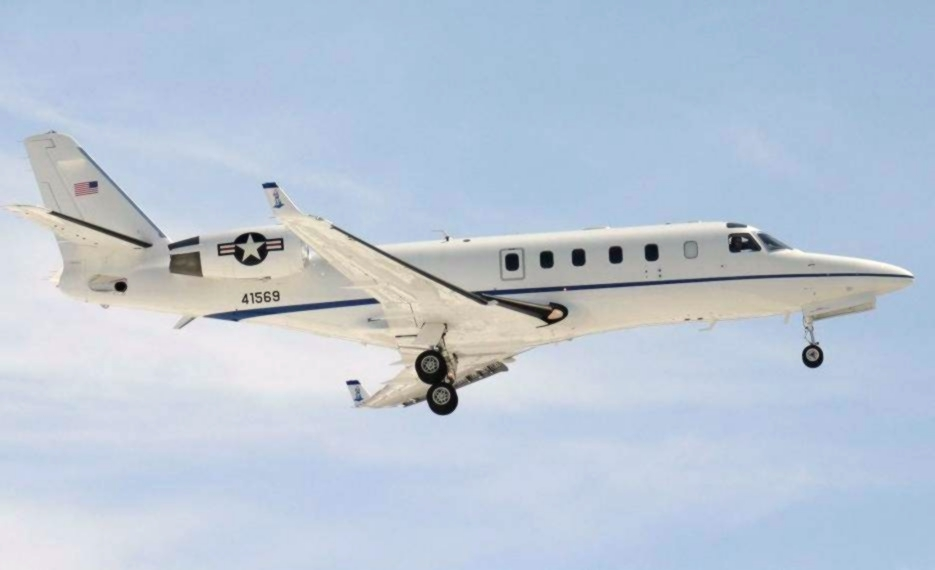
C-38A Courier (s/n 94-1569) of the 201st Airlift Squadron in flight.

In mid-1996, the Air Force, in response to budget cuts, and changing world situations, began experimenting with Air Expeditionary organizations. The Air Expeditionary Force (AEF) concept was developed that would mix Active-Duty, Reserve and Air National Guard elements into a combined force. Instead of entire permanent units deploying as "Provisional" as in the 1991 Gulf War, Expeditionary units are composed of "aviation packages" from several wings, including active-duty Air Force, the Air Force Reserve Command and the Air National Guard, would be married together to carry out the assigned deployment rotation.

In February 1997 the 121st Expeditionary Fighter Squadron (121st EFS) was first formed from 113th personnel and aircraft and deployed to Incirlik Air Base, Turkey in support of Operation Northern Watch (ONW). Operation Northern Watch was a US European Command Combined Task Force (CTF) who was responsible for enforcing the United Nations mandated no-fly zone above the 36th parallel north in Iraq. This mission was a successor to Operation Provide Comfort which also entailed support for the Iraqi Kurds. The 121st EFS returned to Andrews in April 1997. The 121st EFS was again formed in January 1998 when the Wing was tasked with a second Operation Northern Watch deployment to Incirlik Air Base. This time the deployment was only for a month with less than 100 personnel being deployed.

=== Post 9/11 ===
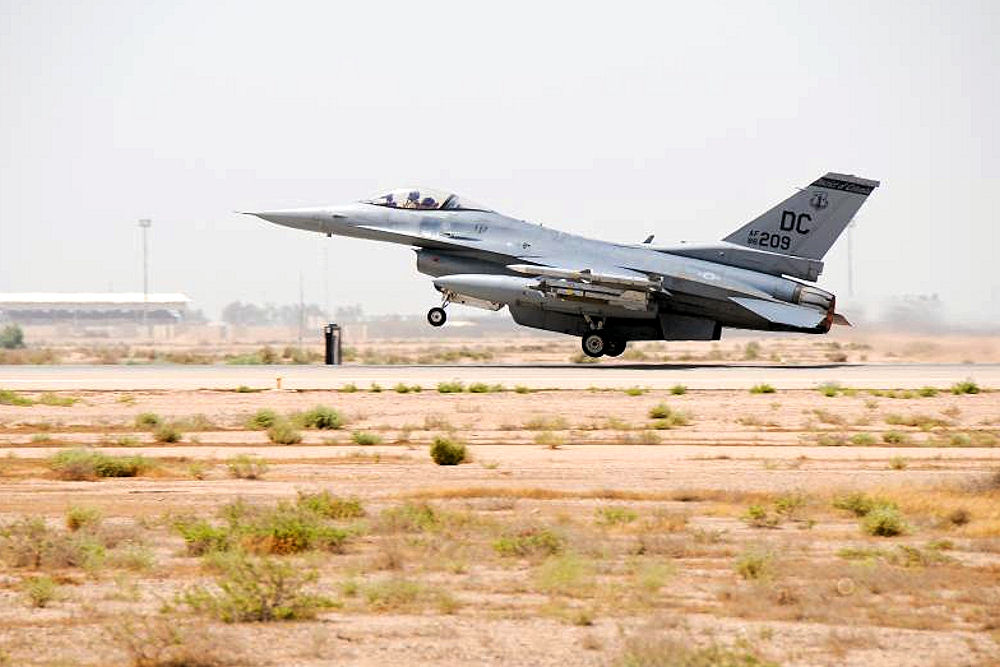
121st Expeditionary Fighter Squadron F-16C Fighting Falcon 86-0209 lifts off the runway at Balad AB, Iraq

On 11 September 2001, the wing was given authorization for its pilots to shoot down threatening aircraft over Washington, D.C.

After the events of 11 September 2001 the squadron took on an Air Sovereignty Alert Detachment role, stationing a number of aircraft at air force bases around the country to fly alert missions as part of Operation Noble Eagle (ONE).

During one of those missions, on 11 May 2005 the squadron scrambled to intercept an aircraft that wandered into the no-fly zone around the White House. Customs officials had also scrambled a Sikorsky UH-60 Black Hawk helicopter and a UC-35B Cessna Citation jet at 11:47 a.m. to intercept the plane. The Customs aircraft gave way when the F-16s arrived flew on the wing tips of the little plane. They dipped their wings – a pilot's signal to 'follow me' – and tried to raise the pilot on the radio. But the Cessna didn't change course and it was flying too slow for the F-16s. The frustrated pilots had to take turns dropping flares, breaking away and returning to drop more flares. One senior Bush administration counter-terrorism official said it was 'a real finger-biting period' because they came very close to ordering a shot against a general aircraft. Finally, when the Cessna came within three miles of the White House – just a few minutes flying time – it altered course.

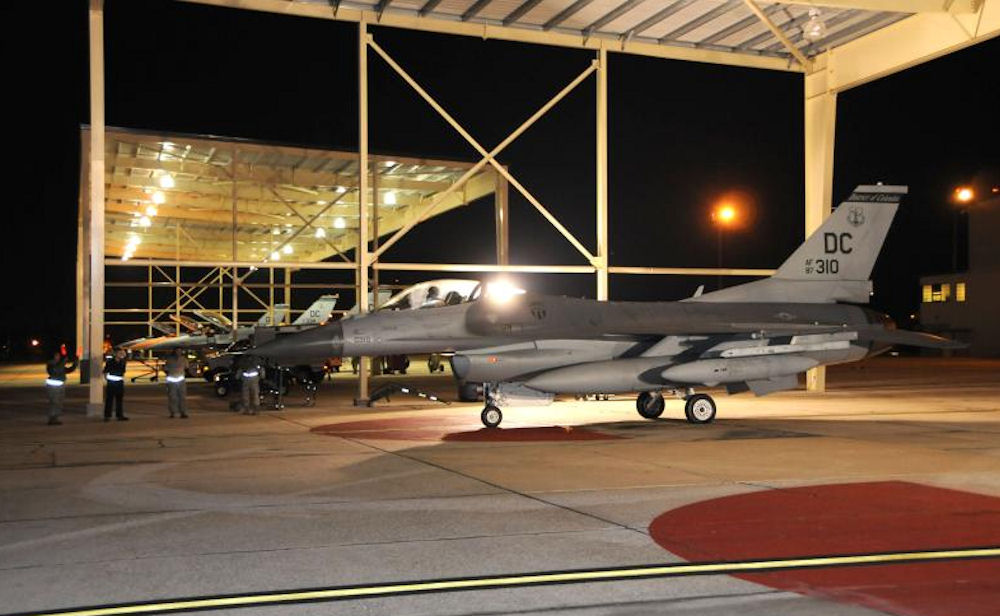
F-16C block 30#87-0310 from the 121st FS is ushered out onto the runway before heading out for its deployment to Afghanistan on 11 October 2011

In its 2005 BRAC Recommendations, the DoD recommended that Cannon Air Force Base be closed. As a result, it would distribute the 27th Fighter Wing’s F-16 Fighting Falcons to the 113th Wing (nine aircraft) and several other installations. The committee said that this move would sustain the active/Air National Guard/Air Force Reserve force mix by replacing aircraft that retire in the 2025 Force Structure Plan. However, the base was temporarily removed from closure 26 August 2005, pending review of new mission assignment.

On 6 May 2008, the squadron flew its 2000th scramble since the events of 11 September 2001. Most scrambles do not lead to such stories as noted above.

The 121st Expeditionary Fighter Squadron has been formed and deployed numerous times as part of the global war on terrorism. Supporting Operation Iraqi Freedom (OIF), the 121st EFS deployed to Balad Air Base, Iraq, in 2003, 2007 and 2010. A deployment to Bagram Air Base, Afghanistan in support of Operation Enduring Freedom (OEF) was made between October 2011 and January 2012.

== Lineage ==
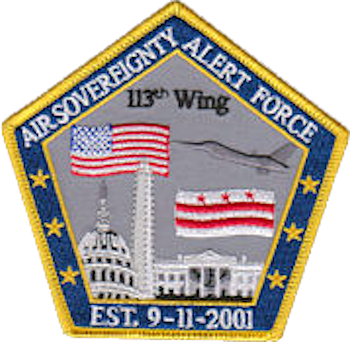
113th Wing Air Sovereignty Alert Force (Operation Noble Eagle, 2001

- Established as the 113th Fighter Wing, extended federal recognition and activated on 1 November 1950
- Called into active service on 1 February 1951
- Redesignated 113th Fighter-Interceptor Wing on 10 February 1951

Inactivated on 6 February 1952
Released from active duty, returned to District of Columbia control and activated on 1 November 1952

- Redesignated 113th Fighter-Bomber Wing on 1 December 1952
- Redesignated 113th Fighter-Interceptor Wing on 1 July 1955

Redesignated 113th Tactical Fighter Wing on 1 November 1958
Federalized and ordered to active service on 26 January 1968
Released from active duty and returned to District of Columbia control on 18 June 1969
Redesignated 113th Fighter Wing on 15 March 1992
Redesignated 113th Wing on 20 June 1992

=== Assignments ===
- District of Columbia Air National Guard, 1 November 1950
- Eastern Air Defense Force, 1 February 1951
- District of Columbia Air National Guard, 1 November 1952
- 833d Air Division, 26 January 1968
- District of Columbia Air National Guard, 18 June 1969
- Gaining Commands

Air Defense Command, 1 November 1952
Tactical Air Command, 1 November 1958
Air Combat Command, 1 June 1992 – present

=== Stations ===
- Andrews Air Force Base, 1 November 1950
- Newcastle Air Force Base, 16 February 1951 – 6 February 1952
- Andrews Air Force Base, 1 November 1950
- Myrtle Beach Air Force Base, 26 January 1968
- Andrews Air Force Base (later Joint Base Andrews), 18 June 1969 – present

=== Components ===
Groups

- 113th Fighter Group (later 113th Fighter-Interceptor Group, 113th Fighter-Bomber Group, 113th Fighter-Interceptor Group, 113th Tactical Fighter Group, 113th Operations Group), 1 November 1950 – 9 December 1974, 1 January 1993 – present

Squadrons

- 121st Fighter Squadron (later 121st Fighter-Interceptor Squadron, 121st Tactical Fighter Squadron, 121st Fighter, Squadron), 9 December 1974 – 1 January 1993
- 201st Airlift Squadron, 20 June 1992 – 1 January 1993

=== Aircraft ===
- Republic F-84C Thunderjet, 1950–1951
- Lockheed F-94B Starfire, 1951–1952
- North American F-51H Mustang, 1952–1954
- North American F-86A Sabre, 1954–1955
- North American F-86E Sabre, 1955–1957
- North American F-86H Sabre, 1957–1960
- North American F-100C Super Sabre, 1960–1971
- North American F-100F Super Sabre, 1960–1971
- Republic F-105D Thunderchief, 1971–1982
- Republic F-105F Thunderchief, 1971–1982
- McDonnell F-4D Phantom II, 1981–1990
- F-16A Fighting Falcon, 1989–1994
- F-16B Fighting Falcon, 1989–1994
- F-16C Fighting Falcon, 1994 – present
- F-16D Fighting Falcon, 1994 – present
- Gulfstream C-38A Courier, 1998–2015
- Boeing C-40 Clipper, 2004 – present
