= 833d Air Division =

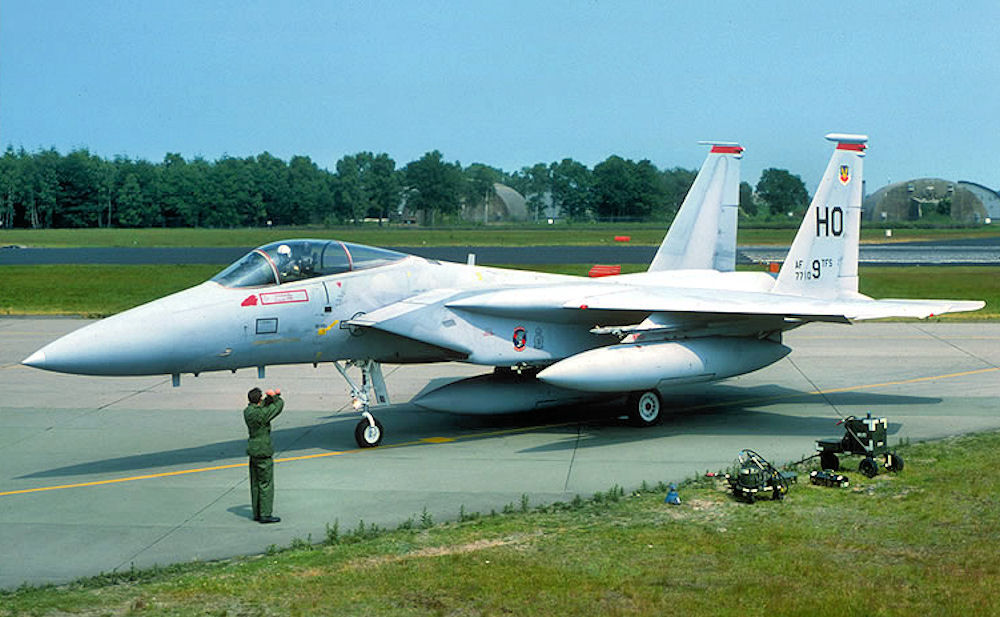
- F-15 Eagle of the 49th Tactical Fighter Wing (Note: Aircraft is McDonnell Douglas F-15A-19-MC Eagle, serial 77-0109. This airplane was retired to Aerospace Maintenance and Regeneration Center on 4 March 2008.)
- Active: 1964–1969; 1980-1991
- Country: United States
- Branch: United States Air Force
- Role: Command of tactical fighter forces

Commanders
- Notable commanders: Gen Chuck Horner; Maj. Gen. Willard W. Millikan; Gen Lloyd W. Newton (Note: In addition to these former commanders who received four stars, Col Murphy, Brig Gen Carson and Brig Gen Record were all later promoted to Lieutenant General.)

Insignia
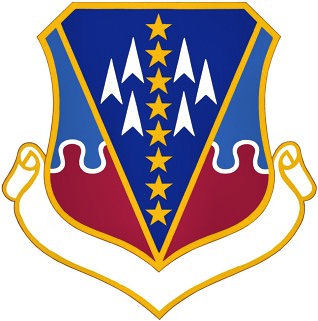
- 833d Air Division emblem (Note: Approved 20 May 1966. Description: Medium blue, a base nebuly gules fimbriated argent, overall on a pile azure fimbriated or, eight mullets in pale of the like [color] between six flight symbols ascending palewise three and three per chevron, two and one, of the third [color mentioned], all within a diminished bordure or.)

The 833d Air Division is an inactive United States Air Force (USAF) organization. Its last assignment was with Tactical Air Command (TAC), assigned to Twelfth Air Force at Holloman Air Force Base, New Mexico. It was inactivated on 15 November 1991.

The division was first activated in late 1964 at Seymour Johnson Air Force Base, North Carolina and assumed command of tactical fighter wings and a tactical reconnaissance wing located in the Carolinas. Its subordinate units participated in the response to the Dominican Republic crisis of 1965–1966.

During the Vietnam War, its subordinate wings trained aircrews in fighter and reconnaissance aircraft. Its 363d Tactical Reconnaissance Wing maintained detachments in Southeast Asia and trained squadrons that transferred to fly combat operations, while its 354th Fighter Wing transferred its last combat squadron to the Pacific in 1968 and became non-operational.

During the Pueblo crisis in 1968, its 4th Tactical Fighter Wing deployed to the Pacific, while three Air National Guard groups were mobilized and assigned to the 833d. The division was inactivated in 1969 and its wings transferred to Ninth Air Force.

The 833d was activated again in 1981, when it replaced Tactical Training, Holloman as the headquarters for TAC units stationed at Holloman. It trained pilots in the McDonnell F-15 Eagle and conducted fighter lead in training in the Northrop T-38 Talon. During Operation Desert Storm, most of its strength deployed to the Middle East, while activated reservists took their places at Holloman. In 1991 the division was inactivated when the USAF conducted the Objective Wing reorganization, which placed all units on a single base into a single wing.

== History ==
=== Seymour Johnson Air Force Base ===
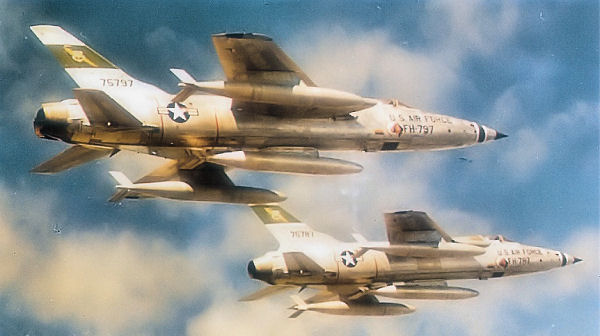
4th Tactical Fighter Wing F-105s

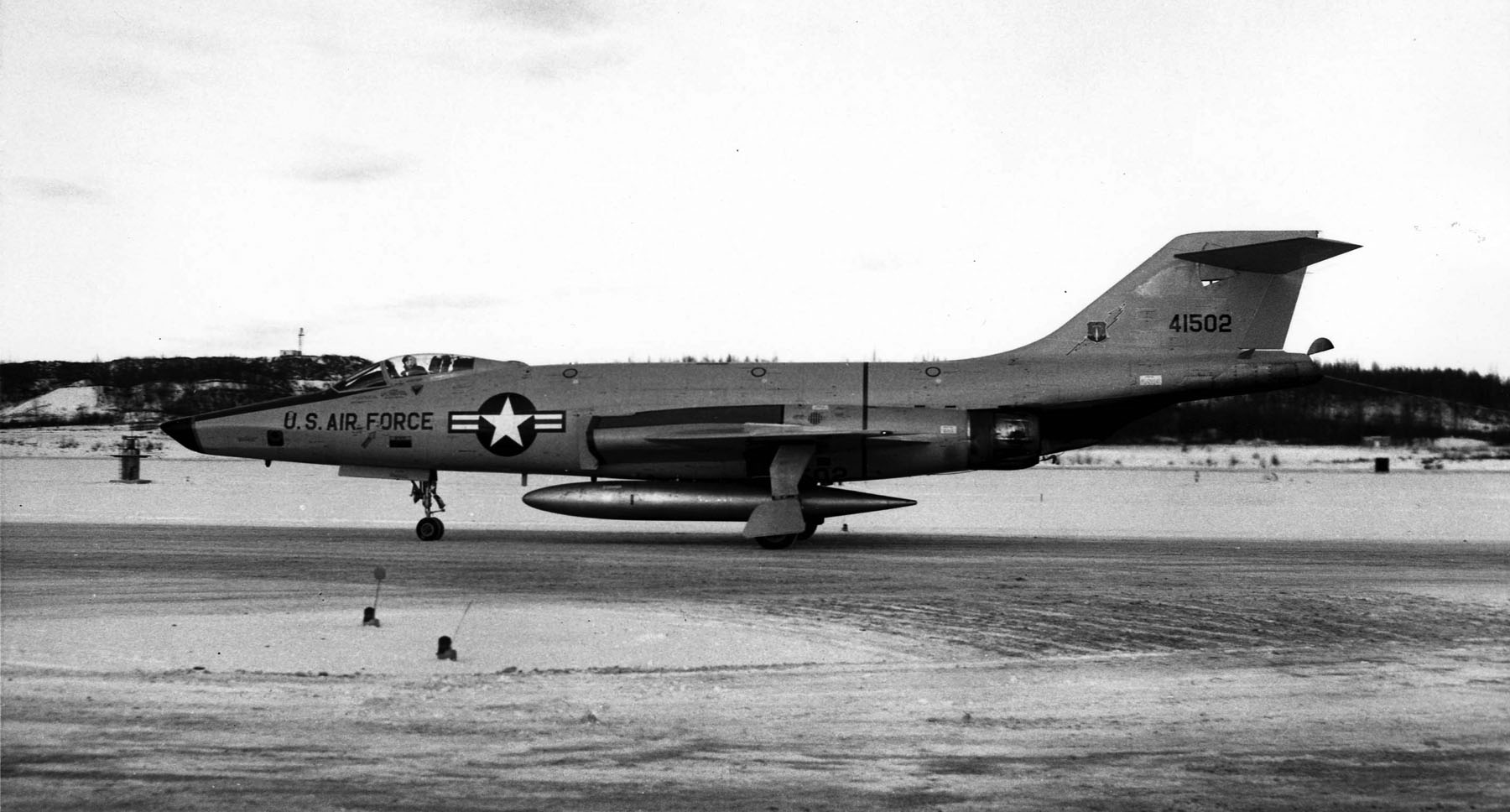
363d Tactical Reconnaissance Wing RF-101 (Note: Aircraft is McDonnell RF-101A-25-MC, serial 54-1502, deployed to Elmendorf Air Force Base, Alaska.)

The 833d Air Division was organized by Tactical Air Command (TAC) on 1 October 1964 at Seymour Johnson Air Force Base, North Carolina, although it did not receive its first manning until a week later. The division was originally assigned the 4th Tactical Fighter Wing at Seymour Johnson, the 354th Tactical Fighter Wing at Myrtle Beach Air Force Base, South Carolina and the 363d Tactical Reconnaissance Wing at Shaw Air Force Base. South Carolina. The 4th Wing flew the Republic F-105 Thunderchief, while the 354th Wing was equipped with North American F-100 Super Sabres. The 363d had a variety of reconnaissance aircraft and in addition to its reconnaissance mission, performed a number of test projects for the Tactical Air Reconnaissance Center, which was also located at Shaw.

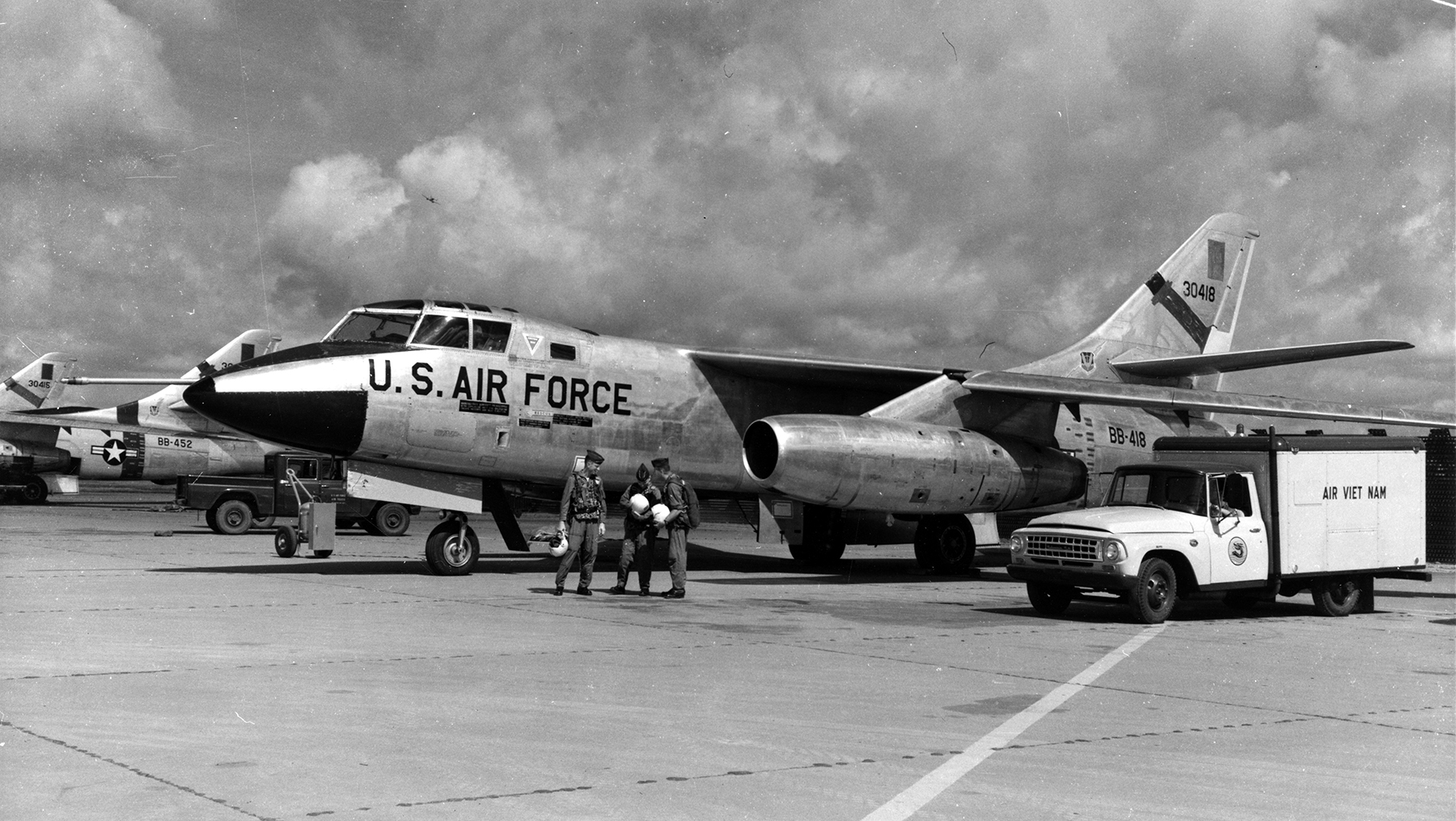
363d Wing RB-66B deployed to Vietnam (Note: Aircraft is Douglas RB-66B-DL Destroyer serial 53-418, taken at Tan Son Nhut Airport in 1965. This plane went to the Military Aircraft Storage and Disposition Center on 11 December 1969, was declared excess on 16 February 1970 and scrapped on 3 September 1975. Baugher, Joe (5 August 2023). "1953 USAF Serial Numbers". Joe Baugher..)

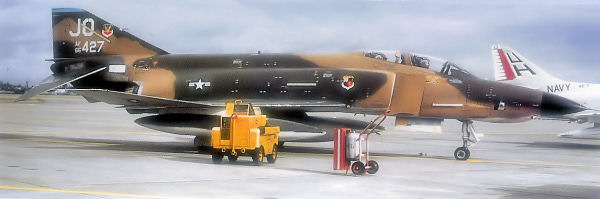
363d TRW RF-4C at Shaw AFB

Between 1964 and 1969, the division supported USAF operations in Southeast Asia. Its 4th Wing conducted replacement training for F-105 pilots. The 354th Wing deployed all but one of its squadrons overseas by April 1966. The 363d Wing deployed detachments to Southeast Asia and trained reconnaissance squadrons that moved to the Pacific after becoming combat ready. Later the 363d focused on replacement training of tactical reconnaissance and electronic warfare aircrews.

During the Dominican Republic crisis of 1965–1966, the division's 363d Tactical Reconnaissance Wing flew the greatest part of reconnaissance missions. and division personnel and aircraft deployed to Ramey Air Force Base, Puerto Rico, and San Isidro Air Base, Dominican Republic.

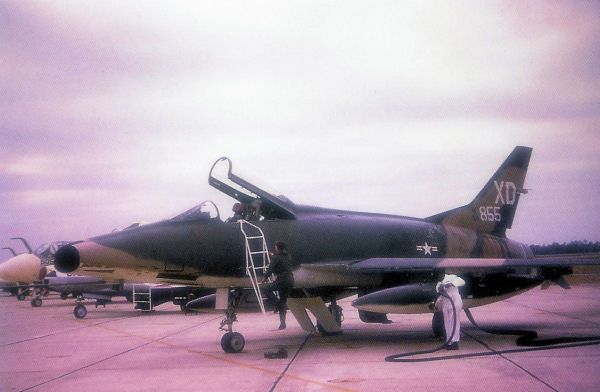
Air National Guard F-100 at Myrtle Beach AFB

The seizure of the USS Pueblo on the high seas by the North Koreans in January 1968 saw elements of the division's assigned wings deployed to the Far East. With the departure of the 4th Wing from Seymour Johnson for Korea, the division assumed command of the 4th Combat Support Group and responsibility for managing support activities on the base for six months. In April, a number of Air National Guard organizations were called to extended service and incorporated into the 833d's training program. Four groups were assigned to the division, and an additional seven augmented the division's wings. Brigadier General Willard W. Millikan of the District of Columbia Air National Guard assumed command of the 833d. As the Guard units were mobilized, the 354th Wing transferred its last operational squadron to Viet Nam, becoming non-operational as it turned its remaining resources over to the 113th Tactical Fighter Wing, which became the host for Myrtle Beach. In July, the 354th moved on paper to Korea, where it took over the deployed resources of the 4th Wing and Guard units and was reassigned.

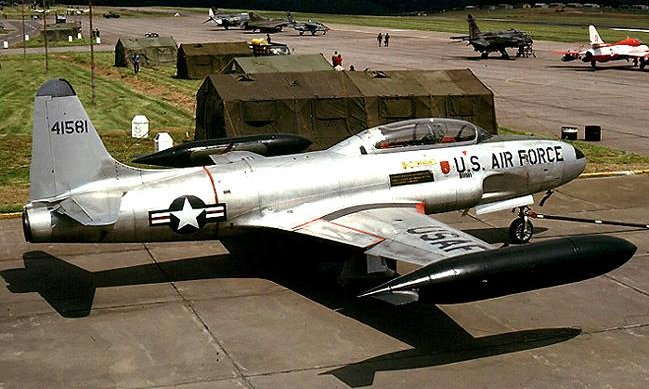
4554th CCTW T-33A

In late May 1969 in preparation for the return to state control of the Air National Guard units that had been federalized for the Pueblo Crisis, TAC activated the 4554th Combat Crew Training Wing at Myrtle Beach. The 4554th focused on fighter lead in training using Lockheed T-33 T-Bird armed trainers, including for foreign students who were trained in the T-Bird under the Military Assistance Program. The 4554th also began actions for becoming the first Air Force wing to operate the LTV A-7 Corsair II, although it did not receive its first A-7s until after the division inactivated. On 18 June, all mobilized Guard units had been relieved from the wing and returned to state control. A little more than six months later, on 24 December 1969, the 833d was inactivated and its assigned units transferred to Ninth Air Force.

=== Holloman Air Force Base ===
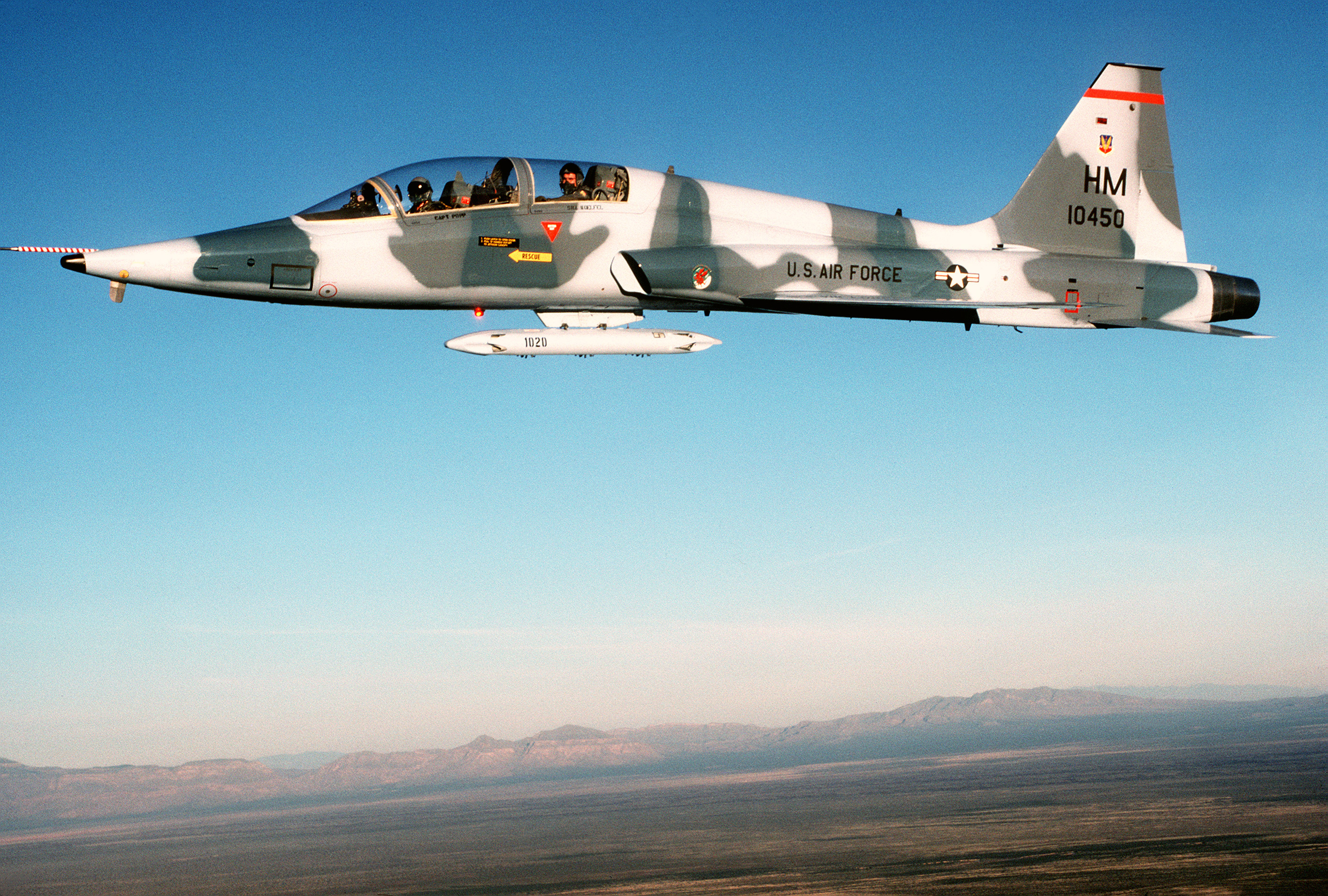
479th Tactical Training Wing AT-38B (Note: Aircraft is Northrop T-38B-60-NO Talon serial 65-10450, later converted to an AT-38. Taken in 1987 over Holloman AFB.)

The 833d was reactivated in December 1980 and assigned to Twelfth Air Force, replacing Tactical Training, Holloman as the headquarters for TAC units at Holloman Air Force Base, New Mexico. The division supervised two assigned wings at Holloman. The division's subordinate units maintained proficiency in the McDonnell F-15 Eagle air superiority fighter and trained aircrews from allied countries. Its subordinate units screened recent pilot training graduates for fighter aptitude and provided academic and flight training in the tactics, techniques and operation of fighter aircraft. The wings also conducted training courses for jet currency, instructor pilot upgrade, and forward air controller orientation. The division also participated in numerous tactical exercises in the Middle East.

Personnel of the 49th Wing's 4449th Mobility Support Squadron, which controlled all of Tactical Air Command's bare base assets, deployed in Operation Urgent Fury, the replacement of the revolutionary government of Grenada with the constitutionally elected government.

In May 1988, the division's 479th Tactical Training Wing maintenance was transferred from squadrons of the wing to a civilian contractor, DynCorp. Downsizing of the 479th continued and in July 1991 the wing was inactivated and replaced by the smaller 479th Fighter Group.

In addition to the deployment of combat units, during Operation Desert Storm subordinate units of the division deployed forces, many of whom were replaced by reservists called to active duty. The 833d Combat Support Group deployed security police personnel, while the medical group sent an air transportable hospital forward. The 4449th Mobility Support Squadron conducted the largest single unit deployment for the first Gulf War.

In July 1991, when the 479th Tactical Training Wing was inactivated, the division had only a single wing under its command. Activities at Holloman were consolidated under the 49th Fighter Wing, which was reorganizing under the Objective Wing model, which called for a single wing on each Air Force Base and the division was inactivated.

== Lineage ==
- Established as the 833d Air Division and activated on 14 September 1964 (not organized)

Organized on 1 October 1964
Inactivated on 24 December 1969

- Activated on 1 December 1980

Inactivated on 15 November 1991

=== Assignments ===
- Tactical Air Command, 14 September 1964 (not organized)
- Ninth Air Force, 1 October 1964 – 24 December 1969
- Twelfth Air Force, 1 December 1980 - 15 November 1991

=== Stations ===
- Seymour Johnson Air Force Base, North Carolina, 1 October 1964 – 24 December 1969
- Holloman Air Force Base, New Mexico, 1 December 1980 – 15 November 1991

=== Components ===
==== Wings ====
- 4th Tactical Fighter Wing: 1 October 1964 – 24 December 1969 (attached to Fifth Air Force ADVON, 29 January - c. 29 July 1968) (Note: All components were stationed with division headquarters, except as noted.)
- 49th Tactical Fighter Wing (later 49th Fighter Wing): 1 December 1980 – 1 October 1991
- 113th Tactical Fighter Wing: 26 January 1968 – 18 June 1969

Myrtle Beach Air Force Base, South Carolina

- 354th Tactical Fighter Wing: 1 October 1964 – 5 July 1968 (not operational after 22 April 1968)

Myrtle Beach Air Force Base, South Carolina

- 363d Tactical Reconnaissance Wing: 1 October 1964 – 24 December 1969

Shaw Air Force Base, South Carolina

- 479th Tactical Training Wing: 1 December 1980 – 26 July 1991
- 4554th Combat Crew Training Wing: 27 May - 24 December 1969

Myrtle Beach Air Force Base, South Carolina

==== Groups ====
- 4th Combat Support Group: 1 January 1968 – 1 July 1968
- 49th Combat Support Group: 1 December 1980 - 1 October 1981
- 107th Tactical Fighter Group: 22 April 1968 – 11 June 1969
- 113th Tactical Fighter Group: 22 April 1968 – 18 June 1969

Myrtle Beach Air Force Base, South Carolina

- 121st Tactical Fighter Group: 22 April 1968 – 18 June 1969

Lockbourne Air Force Base, Ohio

- 177th Tactical Fighter Group: 22 April 1968 – 18 June 1969

Myrtle Beach Air Force Base, South Carolina

- 479th Fighter Group: 26 July - 15 November 1991
- 833d Combat Support Group: 1 October 1981 - 1 October 1991
- 833d Medical Group (see USAF Hospital, Holloman)

==== Other ====
- USAF Hospital, Holloman (later 833d Medical Group), 1 December 1980 - 1 November 1991
- 833d Tactical Hospital, 15 March 1987 - 1 November 1991
- 1877th Communications Squadron, 1 October 1980 - 1 October 1991

=== Aircraft ===
- North American F-100 Super Sabre, 1964–1969
- Republic F-105 Thunderchief, 1964–1966
- Douglas RB-66 Destroyer, 1964–1965

Douglas EB-66 Destroyer, 1966–1969

- McDonnell RF-101 Voodoo, 1966–1969

McDonnell TF-101 Voodoo, 1964–1969

- McDonnell F-4 Phantom II, 1967–1969

McDonnell RF-4 Phantom II, 1965–1969

- Lockheed T-33 T-Bird, 1969
- Lockheed AT-33 T-Bird, 1969
- McDonnell Douglas F-15 Eagle, 1980–1991
- Northrop T-38 Talon, 1980–1991

=== Commanders ===
- Col John R. Murphy, 8 October 1964
- Col Franklin A. Nichols, 1 June 1965
- Brig Gen Charles W. Carson Jr., 1 June 1966
- Col Franklin H. Scott, 4 March 1968
- Brig Gen Willard W. Millikan, 22 April 1968
- Brig Gen Robert V. Spencer, 19 June - 24 December 1969
- Brig Gen Thomas S. Swalm, 1 December 1980
- Brig Gen Charles A. Horner, 10 August 1981
- Brig Gen Peter T. Kempf, 20 May 1983
- Brig Gen James F. Record, 23 September 1985
- Brig Gen James S. Allen, 29 January 1988
- Brig Gen Travis E. Harrell, 28 August 1989
- Brig Gen Lloyd W. Newton, August - 15 November 1991

== See also ==
- List of United States Air Force air divisions
- List of F-100 units of the United States Air Force
- List of F-105 units of the United States Air Force
- List of F-4 Phantom II operators
- List of F-15 operators
