= 121st Fighter Squadron =

121st Fighter Squadron

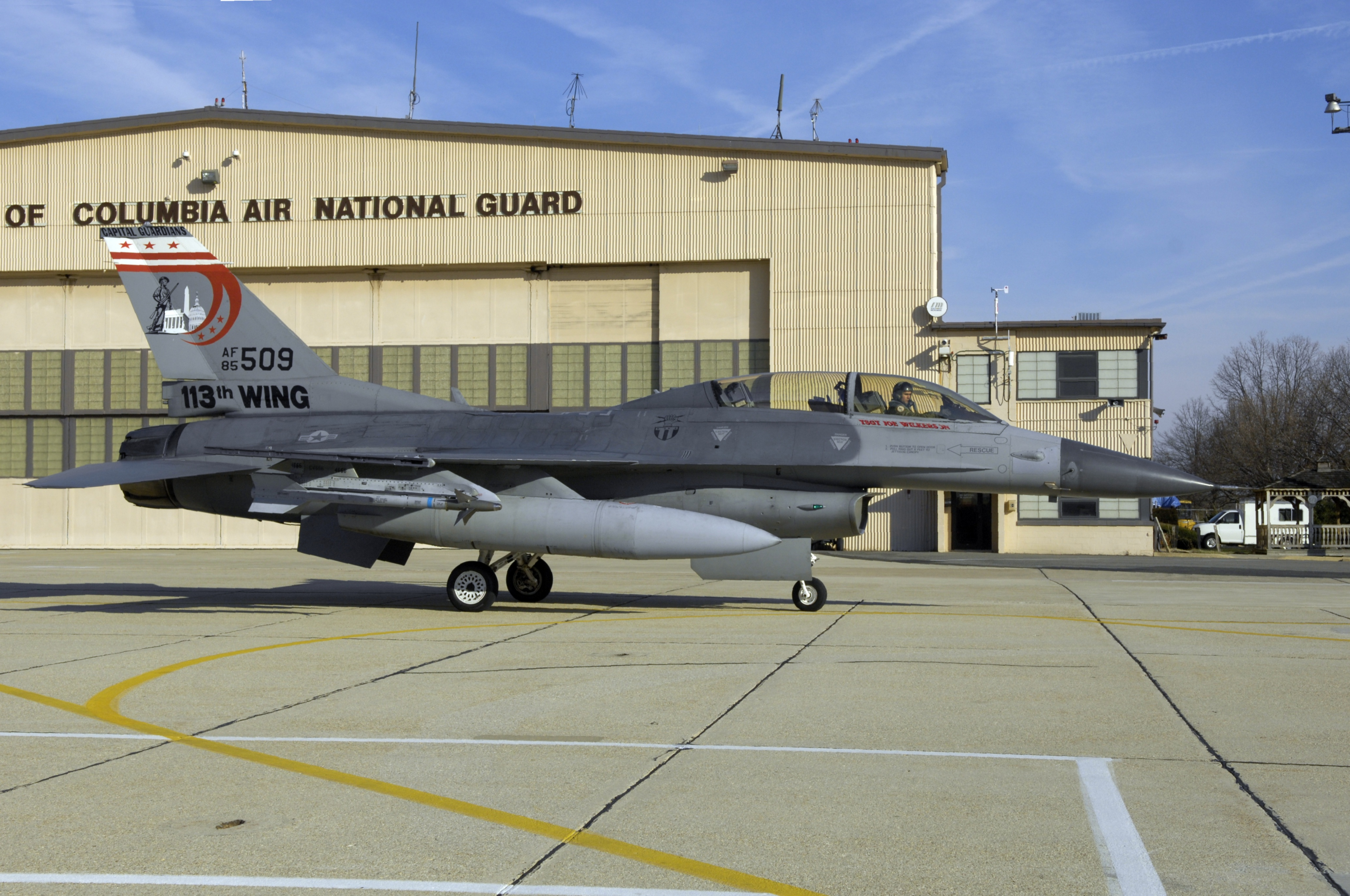
- F-16D Fighting Falcon from the 121st Fighter Squadron (Note: Aircraft is General Dynamics F-16D Block 30 Fighting Falcon, serial 85-1509.)
- Active: 1941–1942; 1943–1945; 1946–1952; 1952–present
- Country: United States
- Branch: Air National Guard
- Type: Squadron
- Role: Fighter
- Part of: District of Columbia Air National Guard
- Garrison/HQ: Joint Base Andrews, Maryland
- Nickname: Capital Guardians
- Engagements: Mediterranean Theater of Operations; Operation Southern Watch; Operation Northern Watch; Operation Iraqi Freedom; Operation Enduring Freedom

Insignia
- 121st Fighter Squadron emblem

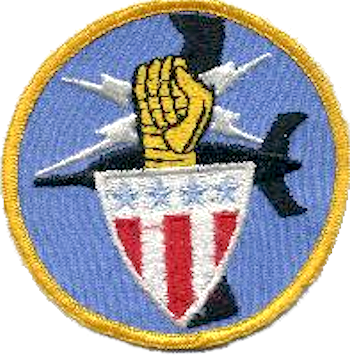
- Patch with 121st Fighter-Interceptor Squadron emblem (Note: Approved 4 September 1951. Description: On a light blue disc, over a stylized aircraft black, a shield, white, thereon four stars, light blue in its upper division; the lower division of the shield, divided equally into three red stripes and two white stripes, above the shield a hand in armor, yellow grasping two lightning flashes white.)

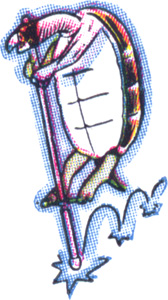
- 121st Liaison Squadron emblem (Note: Approved 1943. Description: A caricatured tan and brown turtle proper, riding a "pogo" stick, leaving a trail of hops and impact marks black, all outlined light turquoise blue. Significance: The turtle depicts slow but sure travel, as characterized by the story of the Tortoise and the Hare in Aesop's Fables. The short hops and limited range of liaison airplanes are depicted by the short hops the turtle is making on the pogo stick.)
- Tail code: DC
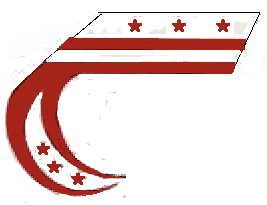
- Tail stripe

The 121st Fighter Squadron is a unit of the District of Columbia Air National Guard 113th Wing located at Joint Base Andrews, Maryland. The 121st is equipped with the Block 30 F-16C/D Fighting Falcon.

The squadron is a descendant organization of the 121st Observation Squadron, established July 10th 1940. It is one of the 29 original National Guard Observation Squadrons of the United States Army National Guard formed before World War II.

== History ==
=== Origins ===
The squadron was established as the 112th Observation Squadron and allotted to the District of Columbia National Guard in July 1940. It was formed in Washington D.C., without aircraft assigned, and was not organized until April 1941.

=== World War II ===
The unit was ordered to active duty in April 1941 as part of the buildup of the Army Air Corps after the Fall of France. The unit was first assigned to Bolling Field, D.C., and equipped with light observation aircraft. The unit was then transferred to the Third Air Force in September 1941, in which they began flying anti-submarine flights over the South Carolina coastline from airfields in the Columbia area. They were then moved to the First Air Force at Langley Field, Virginia, again engaging in anti-submarine patrols over the Maryland, Virginia, and upper North Carolina coasts and the approaches to Chesapeake Bay. Finally, it was moved to Birmingham, Alabama in October 1942 and then inactivated. The squadron personnel were reassigned to other units and aircraft and transferred to other duties.

The squadron was reactivated in April 1943 as the 121st Liaison Squadron, with a mission to support Army ground units by flying observation missions, performing battlefield reconnaissance for enemy ground forces, and spotting for artillery fire. They were deployed to the Twelfth Air Force in Algeria in March 1944, engaging in liaison and courier operations for Headquarters, Army Air Forces, Mediterranean Theater of Operations (MTO). They were equipped with various light observation aircraft, mostly A-20 Havoc light bombers used for aerial photo-reconnaissance and modified A-24 Banshee dive bombers taken out of combat and modified into RA-24 photo-reconnaissance aircraft.

They were again assigned to the Fifth Army in Italy in September, where they engaged in combat reconnaissance and photo-reconnaissance in Italy as part of the Italian Campaign. The squadron was then broken up, with elements of the squadron transferred to the Seventh Army in Southern France, where they performed combat reconnaissance as part of the Southern France Campaign. Other parts of the squadron remained attached to the Ninth Air Force and Sixth United States Army Group during the Rhineland Campaign and the Western Allied invasion of Germany. The remaining elements of the squadron stayed in Italy as part of the Fifth Army as it advanced north and enemy forces withdrew north of Rome. They were stationed near Florence until the end of the war.

The squadron was returned to the United States at Drew Field, Florida, in August 1945. Most personnel were demobilized although the unit remained active until being inactivated in Oklahoma in November 1945.

=== District of Columbia Air National Guard ===
The squadron was redesignated the 121st Fighter Squadron, and allotted to the National Guard on 24 May 1946. It was organized at Andrews Field, Maryland, and was extended federal recognition on 20 October 1946. The squadron was equipped with P-47D Thunderbolts and was assigned to 113th Fighter Group, also a DC guard unit and was initially gained by Air Defense Command.

The mission of the 121st Squadron was the air defense of the District of Columbia, along with southern Maryland and northern Virginia. Parts were no problem and many of the maintenance personnel were World War II veterans, so readiness was quite high and the planes were often much better maintained than their USAF counterparts. In some ways, the postwar Air National Guard was almost like a flying country club and a pilot could often show up at the field, check out an aircraft and go flying. However, the unit also had regular military exercises that kept up proficiency and in gunnery and bombing contests they would often score at least as well or better than active-duty USAF units, given the fact that most ANG pilots were World War II combat veterans.

In December 1949 the 121st Fighter Squadron converted from its P-47s to F-84C Thunderjets as the first Air National Guard squadron to be equipped with jet aircraft. It was not to be a happy relationship. During 1950, the 121st had lost four Thunderjets in accidents, and two more to undetermined other causes.

On 30 August 1950 the squadron lost a single Republic F-84 Thunderjet during a routine weather training mission of two aircraft. After passing southbound near Gettysburg, Pennsylvania, the F-84C exploded in mid-air at tree height, left a large crater in a field, and scattered wreckage over 3 acres (1.2 ha) of the Hilbert cornfield near the Maryland intersection of the Harney and Bollinger School roads. Along with small parts of the aircraft, a few remains of the pilot were recovered; and the element leader in the lead F-84, 1st Lt. William L. Hall, reported "Alkire had not radioed of any difficulty before the explosion".

==== Korean War activation ====
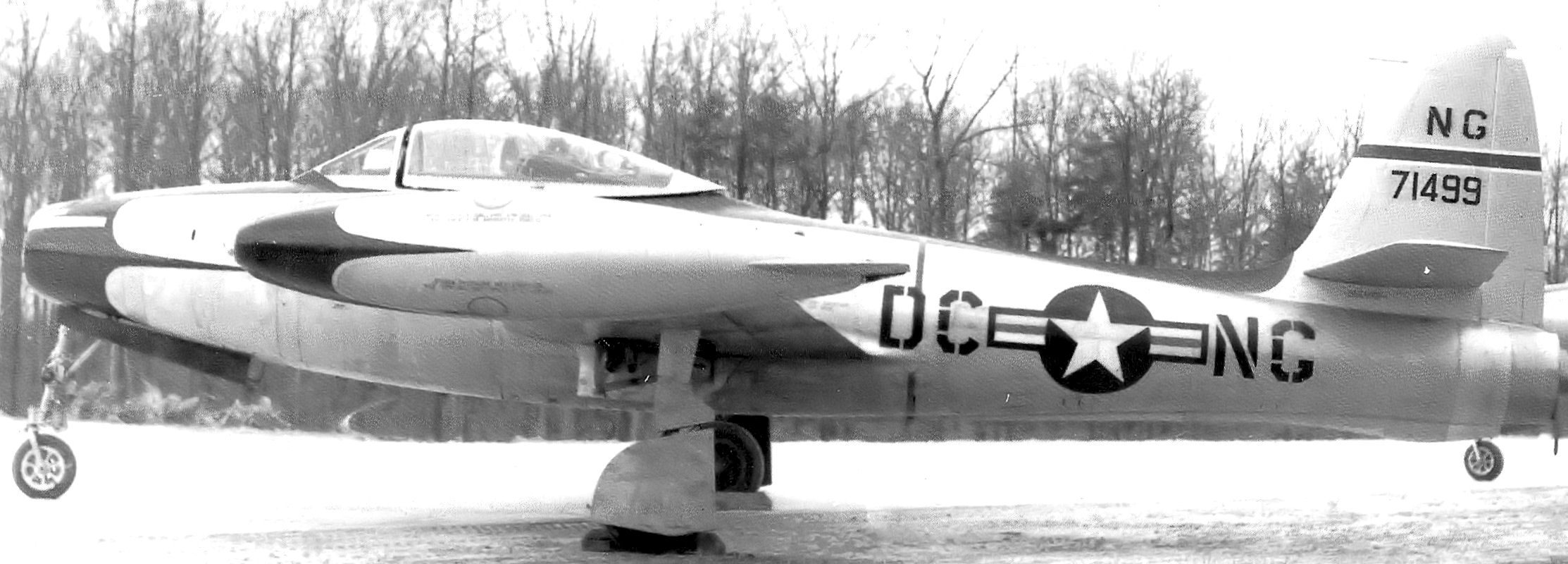
121st Fighter Squadron Republic F-84C Thunderjet 47-1499, about 1950

With the surprise invasion of South Korea on 25 June 1950, and the regular military's lack of readiness, most of the Air National Guard was called to active duty, including the 121st, which was activated on 1 February 1951. The 121st Fighter Squadron became an element of Air Defense Command (ADC) and was redesignated as the 121st Fighter-Interceptor Squadron. The squadron was joined in the 113th Fighter-Interceptor Group by the Delaware ANG 142d Fighter-Interceptor Squadrons, also equipped with F-84Cs, and the Pennsylvania ANG 148th Fighter Squadron equipped with World War II era F-51D Mustangs at Spaatz Field, Reading.

ADC moved the 113th group and its parent 113th Fighter-Interceptor Wing from Andrews to New Castle Air Force Base, Delaware, where they replaced the 4th Fighter-Interceptor Wing and group, which deployed to the Pacific, but the squadron remained at Andrews. The squadron mission was the air defense of the Delaware Bay and the Delmarva Peninsula.

In September 1951 the squadron converted to airborne-interception radar-equipped F-94B Starfires with partial all-weather capabilities. ADC's was experiencing difficulty under the existing wing base organizational structure in deploying its fighter squadrons to best advantage. In February 1952, the 113th wing and group were inactivated and replaced by the regional 4710th Defense Wing. The squadron remained assigned to the wing until it was released from federal service in November 1952, and its mission, personnel, and equipment reassigned to the 95th Fighter-Interceptor Squadron, which activated the same day.

==== Cold War ====
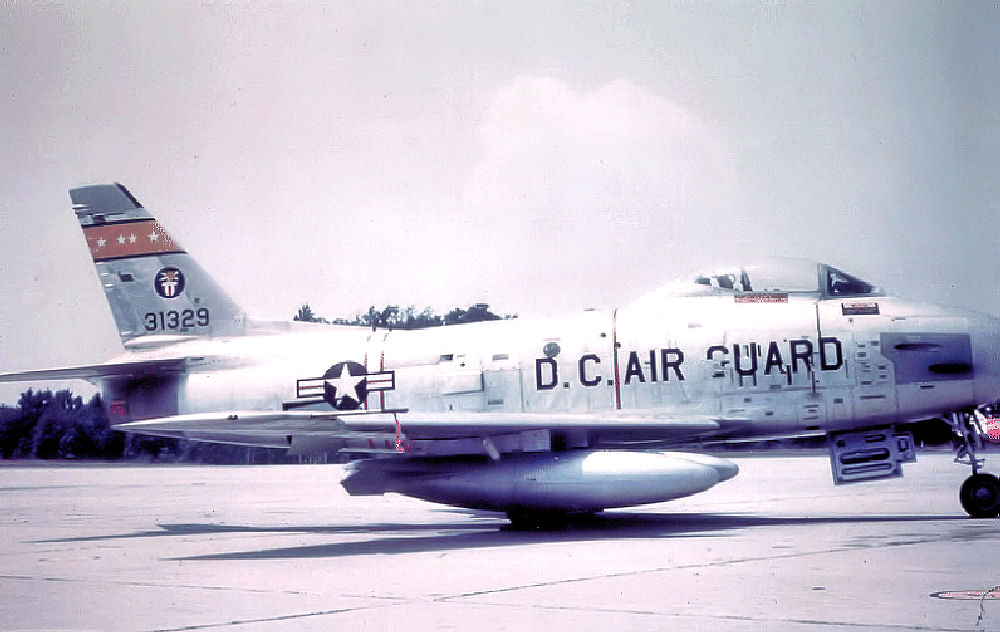
121st TFS F-86H 53-1329

With its return to District of Columbia control, the 121st Fighter-Interceptor Squadron was re-equipped with propeller-driven F-51H Mustangs and resumed its air defense mission of Washington, D.C. It was not until 1954, with the phaseout of the Mustang and the requirement by Air Defense Command that its interceptor squadrons be equipped with jet-powered aircraft that the squadron was upgraded to postwar-era F-86A Sabres that had been refurbished and reconditioned before being received. In August 1954, the 121st began standing daytime air defense alert at Andrews, placing two aircraft at the end of the runway with pilots in the cockpit from one hour before sunrise until one hour after sunset. This ADC alert lasted each and every day until the end of October 1958.

Despite the reconditioning, the F-86A Sabres were weary and required a considerable amount of maintenance to keep in the air. In 1955, the 113th sent them to storage at Davis-Monthan Air Force Base and received F-86E Sabres from active-duty ADC units that were receiving F-89 Scorpion interceptors. In 1957, the F-86H was already being phased out of active service with the USAF, being replaced by the F-100 Super Sabre, and the 121st received F-86H Sabres in late 1957.

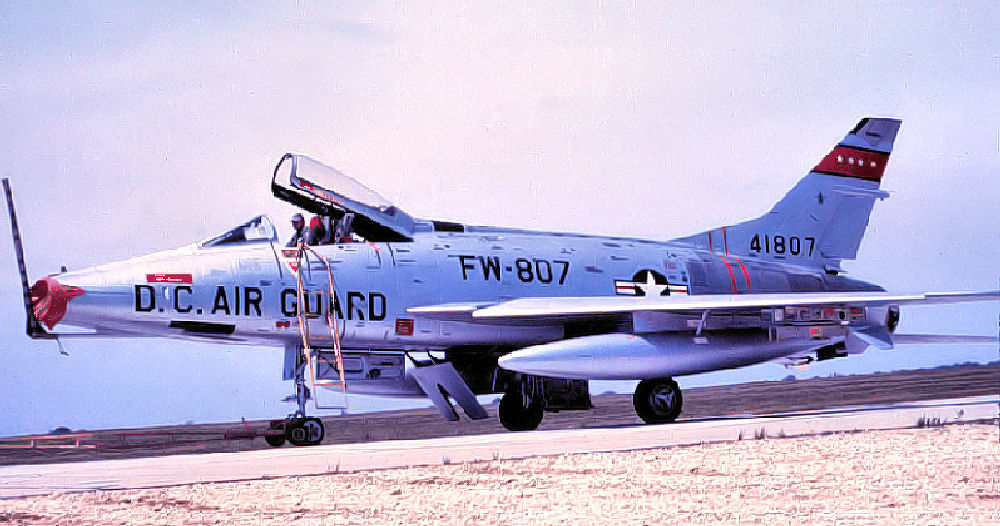
North American F-100C 54-1807 about 1965

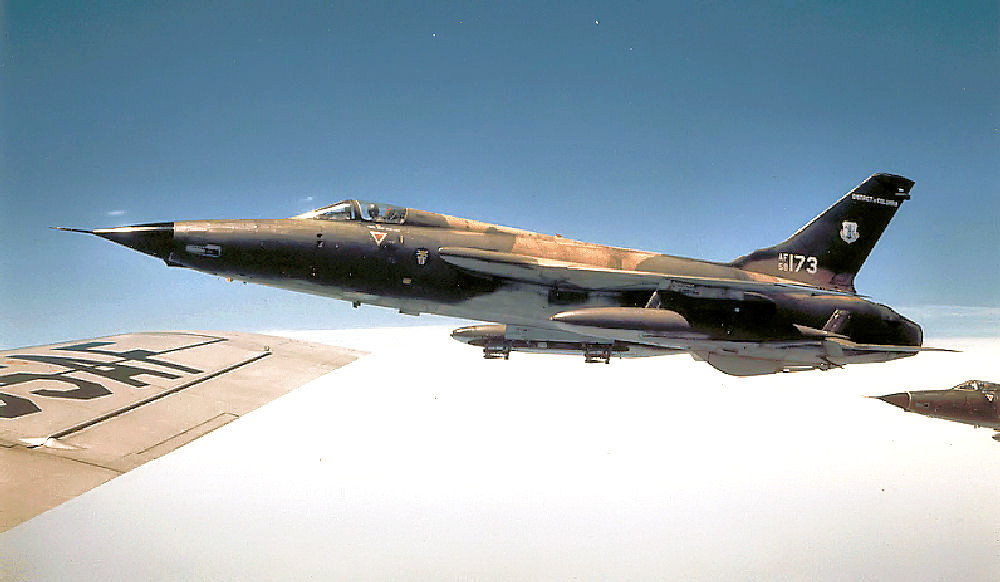
121st Tactical Fighter Squadron F-105D 58-1173 after an air refueling.

In late 1958, the gaining command for the 113th was changed from ADC to Tactical Air Command (TAC) and the mission of the wing was changed to tactical air support, although the air defense of Washington remained as a secondary mission. The Sabres were phased out in 1960 with the receipt of relatively new F-100C Super Sabres from active duty units receiving the F-100D model. The Super Sabre was a major improvement over the F-86H and it gave the wing a major increase in capability as well as it entering the supersonic age.

In January 1968, a new crisis, the seizure of the American ship USS Pueblo by North Korean forces, and again the 113th was called to active duty. The wing was activated to federal service, and its personnel were assigned to Myrtle Beach Air orce Base, South Carolina as a filler unit while the base's permanent unit, the 354th Tactical Fighter Wing was deployed to Kunsan Air Base, South Korea. At Myrtle Beach, the federalized New Jersey Air National Guard 119th Tactical Fighter Squadron joined the 121st on active duty.

The squadron returned to Andrews in June 1969, and transitioned into the F-105D Thunderchief (AKA "Thud") in 1971, receiving Vietnam War veteran aircraft that were being withdrawn from combat. The 113th was one of four Air National Guard units to receive the F-105. A very large and complex aircraft, the 113th was fortunate to have many Vietnam Veteran airman in its ranks by 1970 which had F-105 experience. The Thud was the first USAF supersonic tactical fighter-bomber that was developed from scratch. All others before it were adaptations of aircraft that had originally been developed as pure fighters.

In December 1974, the 113th Tactical Fighter Group was inactivated, with the 121st being assigned directly to the 113th Tactical Fighter Wing.

In 1981 at the end of its service life, the F-105s were retired, with the 113th TFW receiving F-4D Phantom IIs, again receiving Vietnam War veteran aircraft from active-duty units receiving F-15A and F-16A next-generation fighter aircraft. With the F-4, the 113th returned to the air defense mission, becoming part of Air Defense, Tactical Air Command (ADTAC), a named unit at the Numbered Air Force echelon of TAC. ADTAC had taken over the mission of Aerospace Defense Command in 1979 when the command was inactivated; the D.C. Air National Guard using the Phantoms for Washington, D.C. air defense.

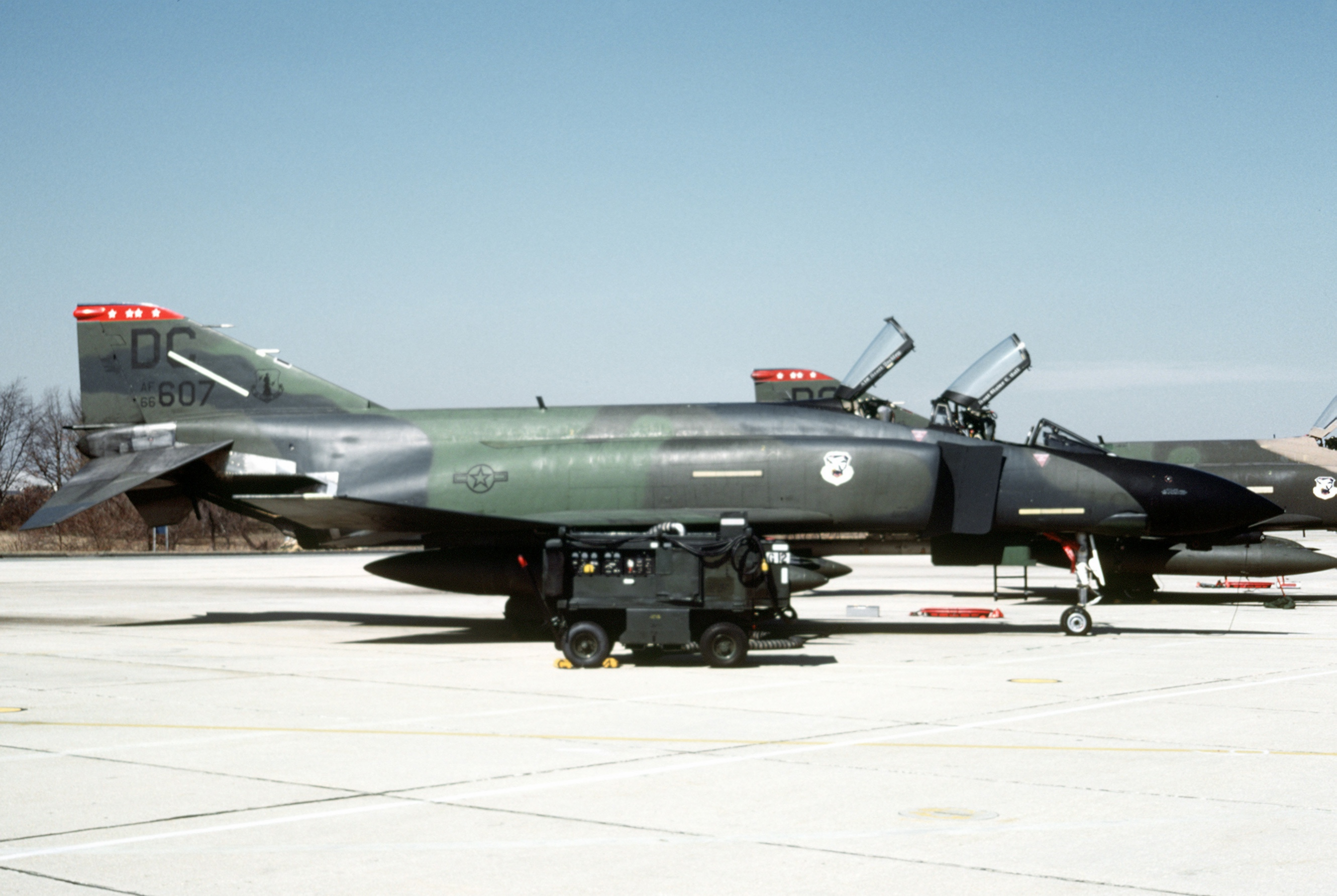
F-4D 66-7607 from the 121st Tactical Fighter Squadron, 1987

The 113th operated the Phantoms throughout the 1980s, retiring the Phantoms at the end of their service life in 1989. In turn, the 121st FS started receiving F-16A Fighting Falcons in September 1989. These were block 5 and 10 models coming from various regular USAF units converting to more modern F-16C/D models. The Wing retained its air defense and attack mission, however the early block 5 and 10 models really designed to do. In the air defense role these models lacked any BVR capability, limiting them only to close range combat with their gun and Sidewinder missiles. In the attack role these aircraft were able to deploy bombs, but with their smaller stabs the center of gravity of these aircraft was far from ideal making it quite a challenge for the pilots to fly these missions.

The 113th Tactical Fighter Wing was not mobilized during the 1991 Gulf Crisis, remaining in the United States with its air defense mission. D. C. Air National Guard volunteers, however were deployed to CENTAF during the crisis and subsequent combat operations as part of Operation Desert Storm.

==== Air Combat Command ====
After the collapse of the Soviet Union in 1990 and Operation Desert Storm, Air Force planners reorganized the major command structure and the organization of its units to reflect the new reality of the 1990s and also a smaller force after the end of the Cold War. Tactical Air Command was replaced by Air Combat Command (ACC) as the gaining command for the 113th effective 1 June 1992. On 15 March 1992, the 113th adopted the new Air Force Objective Organization, which re-designated the wing as the 113th Fighter Wing. The 113th Tactical Fighter Group was reactivated as the 113th Operations Group, and the 121st Fighter Squadron was transferred to the 113th OG. Other support groups under the Objective Wing organization are the 179th Maintenance Group, 179th Mission Support Group and the 179th Medical Group.

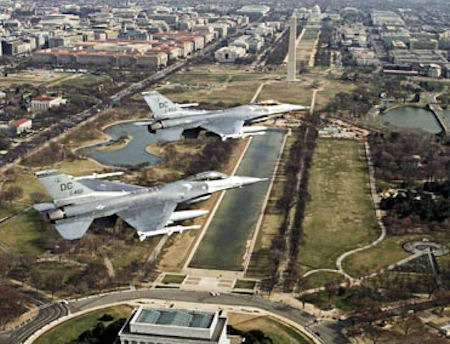
121st Fighter Squadron F-16s over Washington DC

In 1994 the 121st traded its early F-16A aircraft for Block 30 F-16C/D Fighting Falcon which upgraded its capabilities considerably. In May 1996, the 121st Fighter Squadron deployed personnel and aircraft to Al Jaber Air Base, Kuwait to support Operation Southern Watch (OSW). The 121st FS was the first Air National Guard unit to fly OSW. Operation Southern Watch was an operation which was responsible for enforcing the United Nations mandated no-fly zone below the 32nd parallel north in Iraq. This mission was initiated mainly to cover for attacks of Iraqi forces on the Iraqi Shi’ite Muslims. In July 1996, the squadron returned to Andrews AFB.

In mid-1996, the Air Force, in response to budget cuts, and changing world situations, began experimenting with Air Expeditionary organizations. The Air Expeditionary Force (AEF) concept was developed that would mix Active-Duty, Reserve and Air National Guard elements into a combined force. Instead of entire permanent units deploying as "Provisional" as in the 1991 Gulf War, Expeditionary units are composed of "aviation packages" from several wings, including active-duty Air Force, the Air Force Reserve Command and the Air National Guard, would be married together to carry out the assigned deployment rotation.

In February 1997 the 121st Expeditionary Fighter Squadron (121st EFS) was first formed from 113th personnel and aircraft and deployed to Incirlik Air Base, Turkey in support of Operation Northern Watch (ONW). Operation Northern Watch was a US European Command Combined Task Force (CTF) who was responsible for enforcing the United Nations mandated no-fly zone above the 36th parallel north in Iraq. This mission was a successor to Operation Provide Comfort which also entailed support for the Iraqi Kurds. The 121st EFS returned to Andrews in April 1997. The 121st EFS was again formed in January 1998 when the Wing was tasked with a second Operation Northern Watch deployment to Incirlik Air Base. This time the deployment was only for a month with less than 100 personnel being deployed.

On 11 September 2001, the wing was given authorization to shoot down threatening aircraft over Washington, D.C.

After the events of 11 September 2001 the squadron took on an Air Sovereignty Alert Detachment role, stationing a number of aircraft at air force bases around the country to fly alert missions as part of Operation Noble Eagle (ONE).

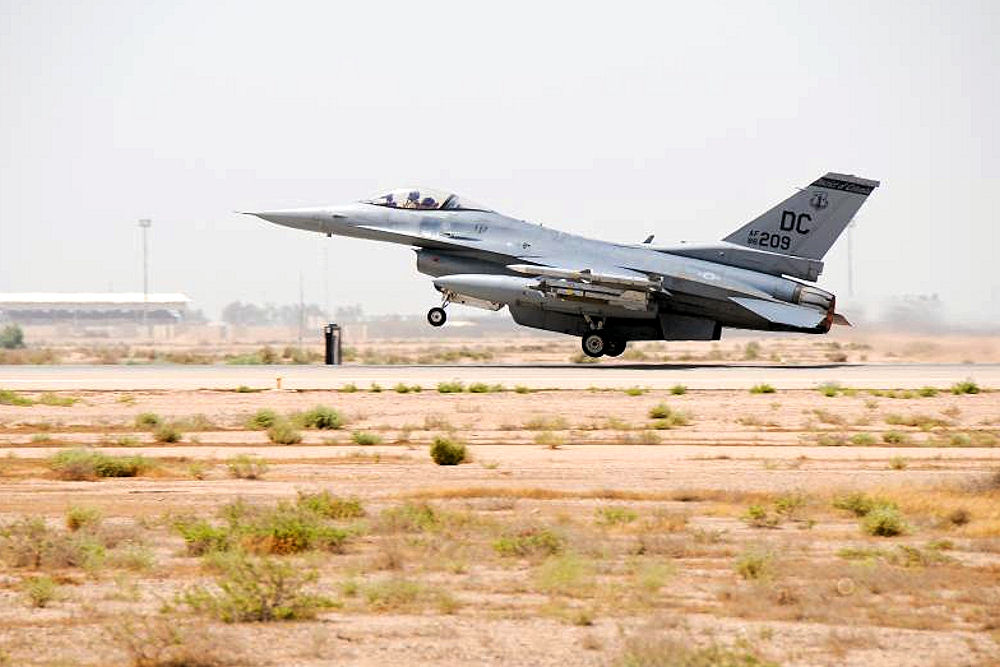
121st Expeditionary Fighter Squadron F-16C Fighting Falcon 86-0209 lifts off the runway at Balad AB, Iraq

During one of those missions, on 11 May 2005 the squadron scrambled to intercept an aircraft that wandered into the no-fly zone around the White House. Customs officials had also scrambled a Sikorsky UH-60 Black Hawk helicopter and a UC-35B Cessna Citation jet at 11:47 a.m. to intercept the plane. The Customs aircraft gave way when the F-16s arrived flew on the wing tips of the little plane. They dipped their wings – a pilot's signal to 'follow me' – and tried to raise the pilot on the radio. But the Cessna didn't change course and it was flying too slow for the F-16s. The frustrated pilots had to take turns dropping flares, breaking away and returning to drop more flares. One senior Bush administration counterterrorism official said it was 'a real finger-biting period' because they came very close to ordering a shot against a general aircraft. Finally, when the Cessna came within three miles of the White House – just a few minutes flying time – it altered course.

In its Base Realignment and Closure, 2005 recommendations, the Department of Defense recommended that Cannon Air Force Base, New Mexico be closed. As a result, it would distribute the 27th Fighter Wing's F-16s to the 113th Wing (nine aircraft) and several other installations. The committee claimed that this move would sustain the active/Air National Guard/Air Force Reserve force mix by replacing aircraft that retire in the 2025 Force Structure Plan. However, the base was temporarily removed from closure 26 August 2005, pending review of new mission assignment.

On 6 May 2008 the squadron flew its 2000th scramble since the events of 11 September 2001. Most scrambles do not lead to such stories as noted above.

The 121st Expeditionary Fighter Squadron has been formed and deployed numerous times as part of the global war on terrorism. Supporting Operation Iraqi Freedom (OIF), the 121st EFS deployed to Balad Air Base, Iraq, in 2003, 2007 and 2010. A deployment to Bagram Air Base, Afghanistan in support of Operation Enduring Freedom was made between October 2011 and January 2012.

=== Lineage ===
- Constituted as the 121st Observation Squadron in the National Guard 30 July 1940 and allotted to the District of Columbia

Organized and Federally recognized on 10 April 1941
Ordered to active service on 1 September 1941
Redesignated 121st Observation Squadron (Light)' on 13 January 1942
Redesignated 121st Observation Squadron on 4 July 1942
Inactivated on 18 October 1942

- Redesignated 121st Liaison Squadron on 2 April 1943

Activated on 30 April 1943
Inactivated on 7 November 1945

- Redesignated 121st Fighter Squadron, Single Engine and allotted to District of Columbia National Guard on 24 May 1946

Extended federal recognition on 26 October 1946
Redesignated 121st Fighter Squadron, Jet in December 1949
Federalized and ordered to active service on: 1 February 1951
Redesignated 121st Fighter-Interceptor Squadron on 1 February 1951
Released from active duty and returned to District of Columbia control, 1 November 1952
Redesignated 121st Tactical Fighter Squadron on 1 November 1958
Federalized and ordered to active service on: 26 January 1968
Released from active duty and returned to District of Columbia control, 18 June 1969
Redesignated 121st Fighter Squadron on 15 March 1993

=== Assignments ===
- District of Columbia National Guard, 10 April 1941
- 65th Observation Group, 1 September 1941 – 18 October 1942
- 76th Reconnaissance Group, 30 April 1943
- I Air Support Command (later I Tactical Air Division), 11 August 1943
- Army Air Forces, MTO, Mar 1944

Attached to United States Fifth Army after 30 September 1944
Two flights assigned to: United States Strategic Air Forces in Europe, 1 November 1944
Two flights assigned to: Ninth Air Force, 29 November 1944
Two flights assigned to: First Tactical Air Force [Prov], 22 December 1944 – 1 March 1945
Further attached to: Sixth United States Army Group, Sep 1944-1 Mar 1945

- Twelfth Air Force, 25 February 1945

Attached to: United States Fifth Army to c. July 1945

- Third Air Force, 25 Aug-7 Nov 1945
- 113th Fighter Group (later 113th Fighter-Interceptor Group), 24 May 1946
- 4710th Defense Wing, 6 February 1952
- 113th Fighter-Interceptor Group (later 113th Tactical Fighter Group), 1 November 1958
- 113th Tactical Fighter Wing, 9 December 1974
- 113th Operations Group, 15 March 1992 – present

=== Stations ===
- 743 14th Street, NW, Washington, D.C., 10 April 1941
- Bolling Field, Washington, D.C., 1 September 1941
- Owens Field, South Carolina, 23 September 1941
- Lexington County Airport, South Carolina, 8 December 1941
- Langley Field, Virginia, 26 December 1941
- Birmingham Army Air Field, Alabama, 18 October 1942
- Vichy Army Air Field, Missouri, 30 April 1943
- Morris Field, North Carolina, 8 May 1943
- Raleigh-Durham Army Air Field, North Carolina, 27 August 1943 – 18 February 1944
- Oran Tafraoui Airport, Algeria, 20 March 1944
- Telergma Airport, Algeria, 17 Apr-9 Jul 1944
- Pomigliano Airfield, Italy, 24 July 1944

A flight located at: Saint-Tropez, France, 1 September 1944
A flight located at: Lyon, France 15 September 1944
A flight located at: Vittel, France, 3 October 1944 – 1 March 1945
D flight located at: Vittel, France, 7 October 1944 – 1 March 1945
Other flights at various points in Italy during period Sep 1944 – May 1945

- Peretola Airport, Florence, Italy, 6 October 1944
- Verona Airfield, Italy, 3 May 1945
- Manerba Airfield, Italy, 16 May 1945
- Peretola Airport, Florence, Italy, 16 Jul–Aug 1945
- Drew Field, Florida, 25 August 1945
- Muskogee Army Airfield, Oklahoma, 13 Sep-17 Nov 1945
- Andrews Field (later Andrews Air Force Base), 20 October 1946
- New Castle County Air Force Base, Delaware, 1 February 1951 – 1 November 1952
- Andrews Air Force Base (later Joint Base Andrews), 1 November 1952 – present

==== District of Columbia National Guard Deployments ====
- Korean War
- 1968 Pueblo Crisis

Operated from: Myrtle Beach AFB, South Carolina, 26 January 1968 – 18 June 1969

- Operation Southern Watch

Al Jaber Air Base, Kuwait, May–July 1996

- Operation Northern Watch (AEF)

Incirlik Air Base, Turkey, February–April 1987
Incirlik Air Base, Turkey, 11 January – 6 February 1998

- Operation Iraqi Freedom (AEF)

Balad Air Base, Iraq, March–29 April 2003
Balad Air Base, Iraq, August–October 2007
Balad Air Base, Iraq, January–April 2010

- Operation Enduring Freedom (AEF)

Bagram Air Base, Afghanistan, 7 October 2011 – January 2012

- Operation Inherent Resolve, Operation Spartan Shield, Operation Enduring Freedom (AEF)

Prince Sultan Air Base, Saudi Arabia, July 2021 – October 2021

=== Aircraft ===
- Douglas O-38, 1941–1942
- North American O-47, 1941–1942
- Curtiss O-52 Owl, 1941–1942
- L-4 Grasshopper, 1943–1944
- L-5 Sentinel, 1943–1944
- L-6 Grasshopper, 1943–1944
- RA-24 Banshee, 1943–1944
- A-20 Havoc, 1944–1945
- UC-78 Bobcat, 1945
- L-17A Navion, 1947-1949
- P-47D Thunderbolt, 1947–1949
- F-84C Thunderjet, 1949–1951
- F-94B Starfire, 1951–1952
- F-51H Mustang, 1952–1954
- F-86A Sabre, 1954–1955
- F-86E Sabre, 1955–1957
- F-86H Sabre, 1957–1960
- F-100C/F Super Sabre, 1960–1971
- F-105D/F Thunderchief, 1971–1982
- F-4D Phantom II, 1981–1990
- Block 5/10 F-16A Fighting Falcon, 1989–1994
- Block 30 F-16C/D Fighting Falcon, 1994 – present

== See also ==
- List of observation squadrons of the United States Army National Guard
