= Aaron Dean =

Aaron Dean may refer to:

- Aaron R. Dean II, US Army general and Adjutant General of the District of Columbia National Guard
- Aaron Dean, former police officer accused of shooting and killing Atatiana Jefferson in Fort Worth, Texas

== See also ==
- Erin Dean, American actress
