= District of Columbia National Guard Honor Guard =

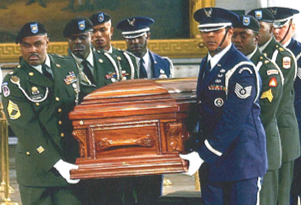
- The DCNG Honor Guardsmen and Airmen were the first to be selected by Congresswoman, Eleanor Holmes Norton, to support the funeral viewing of Rosa Parks (civil rights activist), held October 30–31, 2005.
- Active: 1802 - present
- Country: United States
- Allegiance: District of Columbia
- Branch: United States Army
- Type: Honor Guard
- Role: Public Duties
- Part of: District of Columbia Army National Guard
- Garrison/HQ: DCNG, JFHQ
- Colors: ASU Blues

Commanders
- Current commander: CPT Ashley Callahan, DCNG JFHQ
- First Sergeant: 1SG Clifford Thompson, DCNG JFHQ

The District of Columbia Army National Guard Honor Guard is the Army National Guard's official Honor Guard program for the District of Columbia. The mission of the DCARNG Honor Guard is to provide military funeral honors (MFH) to qualifying veterans and participate in ceremonial and special events. Based on the mission and support needed, selected members of the Air National Guard's Honor Guard program are required to work jointly with the DCARNG to support missions that fall under the DCNG as a whole. The DCARNG Honor Guard program is assigned to the District of Columbia National Guard (DCNG) Joint Force Headquarters (JFHQ) Command.

== Overview ==
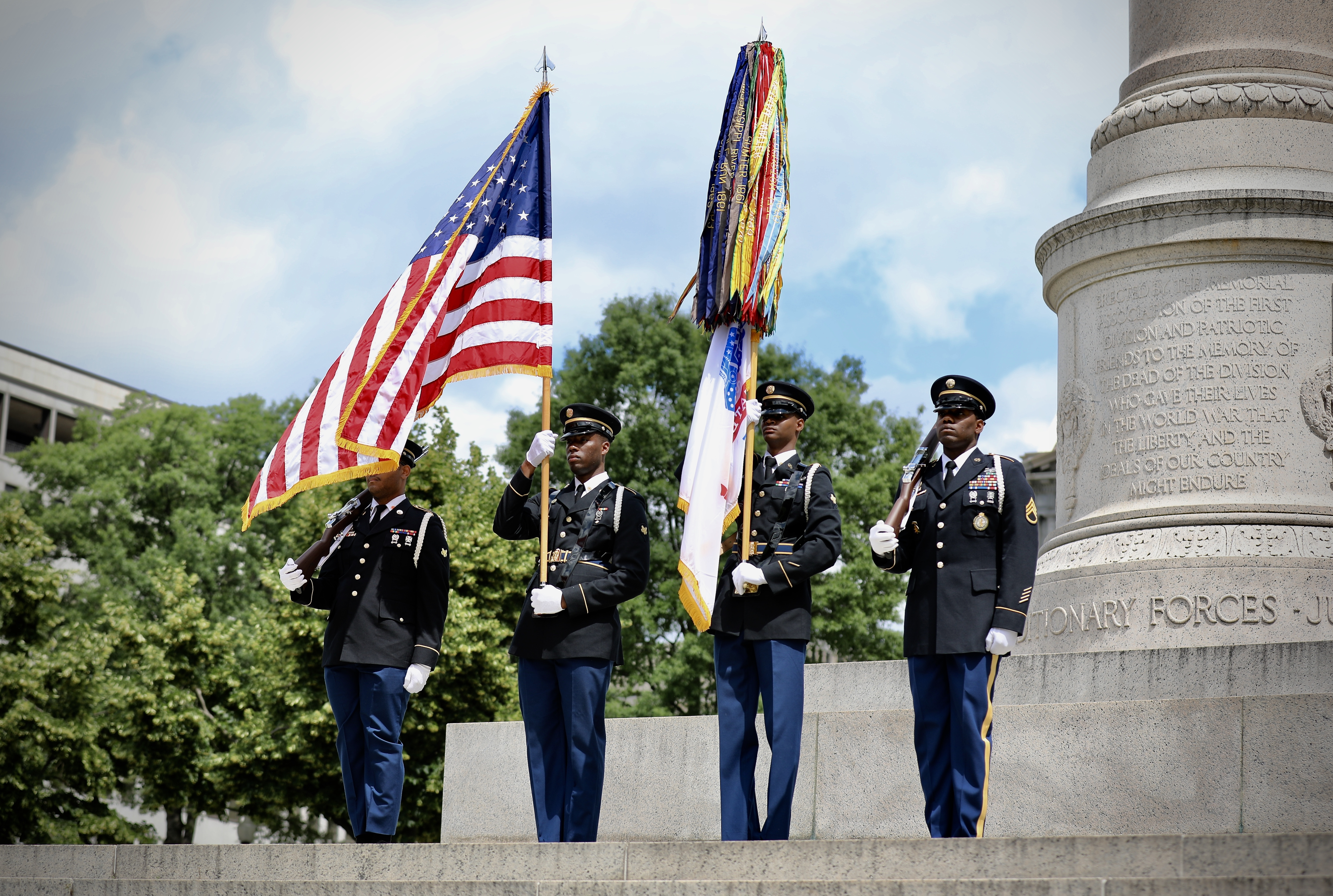
DCARNG Honor Guardsmen display US Flag, May 27, 2019, during Memorial Day ceremony. (photo: SFC Ron Lee, DCNG)

The DCNG is a joint command. It has both DCARNG (Army) and Air National Guard (DCANG) components. Both Guard components have an Honor Guard program established to support its members. When directed by the Commanding General of the DCNG, both Guardsmen and Airmen Honor Guard components perform jointly to support required missions.

The DCARNG Honor Guard program serve several purposes. One is to provide MFH support for fallen Soldiers/Airmen, while the other is to participate in national ceremonies and special events when requested by the Commanding General of the DCNG. The Department of Defense (DoD) is the authority for ensuring all branches of the military services, provide MFH support to eligible veterans. DoD releases the guidelines and policies for all branches of the military to follow when providing military funeral honors. DoD policies state that, at minimum, MFH support will consist of two uniformed service members. One service member will administer the playing of "Taps", while the other present the US flag to family members.

The DCARNG Honor Guard program follows the traditional protocol when presenting or bearing the US flag during selected ceremonies and events, such as the Fourth of July, Veteran's Day, or Memorial Day. The US flag is also displayed during official district/municipal or federal functions.

The picture above depicts the DCARNG Honor Guard members presenting the US flag during a Memorial Day ceremony held on May 27, 2019. The ceremony was in support of the 1st Infantry Division and was held on the grounds of the White House, in President's Park.

== History ==
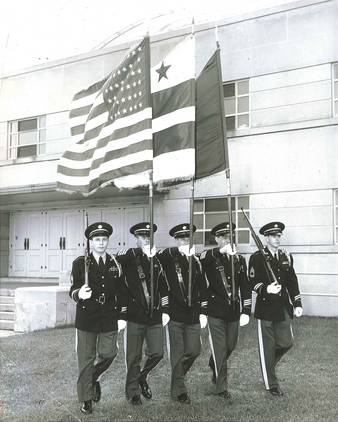
DCARNG Honor Guard members practicing for a ceremony in front of the DC armory during the 1940s.

The DCARNG Honor Guard, along with other branches of the military, has been providing honor and military funeral support to its members as far back as 1899. In 1899, President William McKinley gave full military honors to 336 Soldiers that died in the Spanish–American War. On April 6, 1899, the military escorts for this funeral procession included artillery and cavalry troops from the Washington barracks in Fort Myer, Virginia, a Marine Battalion from the Navy Yard in DC., and the entire District of Columbia Army National Guard. During the procession, each casket included eight pallbearers. At the gravesite, "Taps" was played, and a three-volley salute was fired. The deceased Soldiers were buried in Arlington National Cemetery.

During the 1940s, the DCNG recruited members from various units to participate in performing the Honor Guard protocol. In the picture to the right, five members of the DCARNG, are shown practicing ceremonial flag carry in front of the DCNG armory, located in Washington, DC.

The DCNG Honor Guardsmen and Airmen are the only Guard components in the history of the US to fall under the direct Command and Control of the President of the United States. Although the use of the Honor Guard has been delegated to the Secretary of the Army, and then to the Commanding General of the DCNG. Though these authorities, the DCNG is able to support requests from the DC mayor's office and other agencies within the District of Columbia, such as the DC Metropolitan Police Department.

Upon the death of US citizens that are considered distinguished and have made significant contributions to the US, Congress approves the use of the US Capitol Rotunda for viewing and tribute by the public. In August 2005, US Congresswomen, Eleanor Holmes-Norton (House of Representatives, District of Columbia) secured the use of the DCNG Honor Guard for use in the "lay-in-honor" viewing of Rosa Parks. Rosa Parks was the catalyst that changed the efforts of the civil rights movement during the 1960s.

Eleanor Holmes-Norton also requested the support of the DCNG Honor Guard components for another prominent US citizen, Dorothy Irene Height. Ms. Height's funeral service was held at the US National Cathedral in Washington, DC. on April 29, 2010. Ms. Height was awarded the Congressional Gold Medal by previous President George W. Bush in 2004, the Presidential Medal of Freedom by previous President Bill Clinton in 1994 and was known for her contributions as a civil rights leader.

== Honor Guard Composition ==
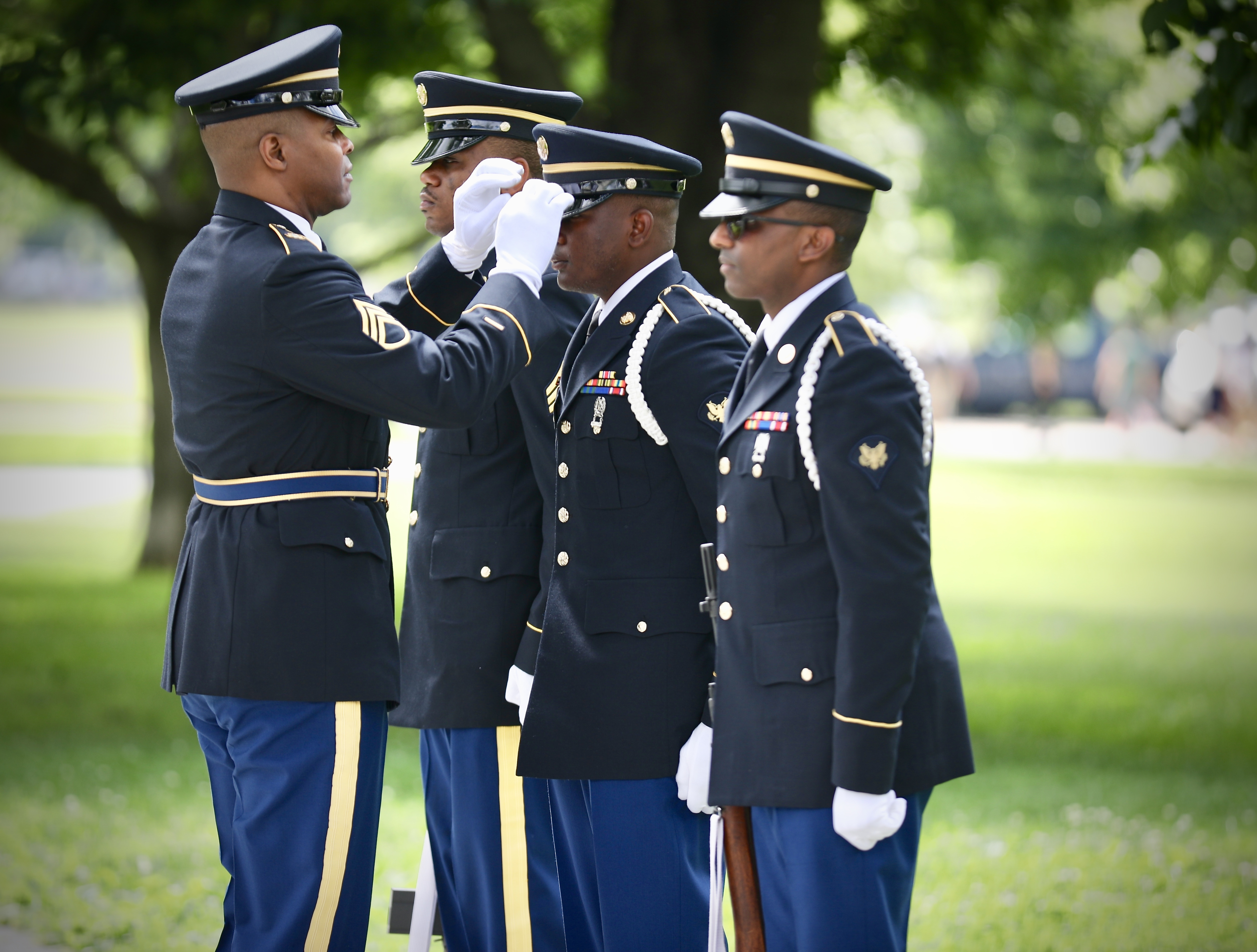
Lead, straightens hat of fellow Soldier prior to ceremony.(photo: SFC Ron Lee, DCNG)

The DCARNG Honor Guard program follows the details outlined within the ARNG-MFH handbook to build its Honor Guard composition. The DCARNG uses a full-time technician, an Honor Guard NCOIC (Non-commissioned officer in charge), and a team leader to implement its Honor Guard program.

Members of the Honor Guard are all volunteers from all ranks. The volunteers are solicited from different commands under the 74th Troop Command such as the 372nd Military Police (MP) Battalion, the different MP companies, 547th Transportation Company, and the 104th Maintenance Company within the DCARNG. The volunteers are screened and selected based on appearance, conduct and ability to execute drill and ceremony commands.

== Gallery ==
=== Funeral Service Support for Notable U.S. Citizens ===
==== Services for Dorothy Height ====
The photographs below show the DCARNG Honor Guardsmen and Airmen participating jointly in the funeral service of civil rights activist, Dorothy Height. The service was held on April 29, 2010, at the US National Cathedral building, Washington, DC. The eulogy was performed by former US President Barack Obama. The Honor Guard composition depicts a 6-man pallbearer team.

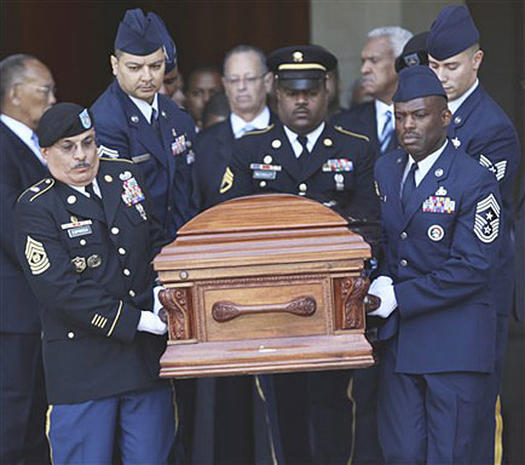

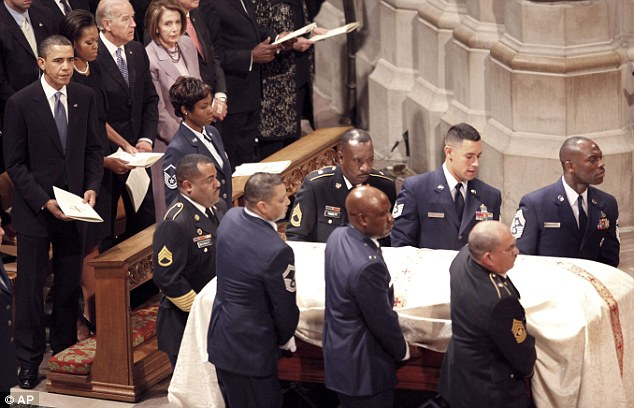

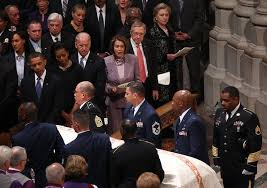

==== Viewing for Rosa Parks ====
Below, the photographs show Guardsmen and Airmen Honor Guards from DCNG, participating jointly in the funeral service of the civil rights activist, Rosa Parks. Ms. Parks, was best known as a civil rights pioneer. Her "lay-in-honor" viewing was held October 30–31, 2005 at the US Capitol Rotunda building, Washington, DC. The joint service Honor Guard composition below depicts an 8-man pallbearer team.

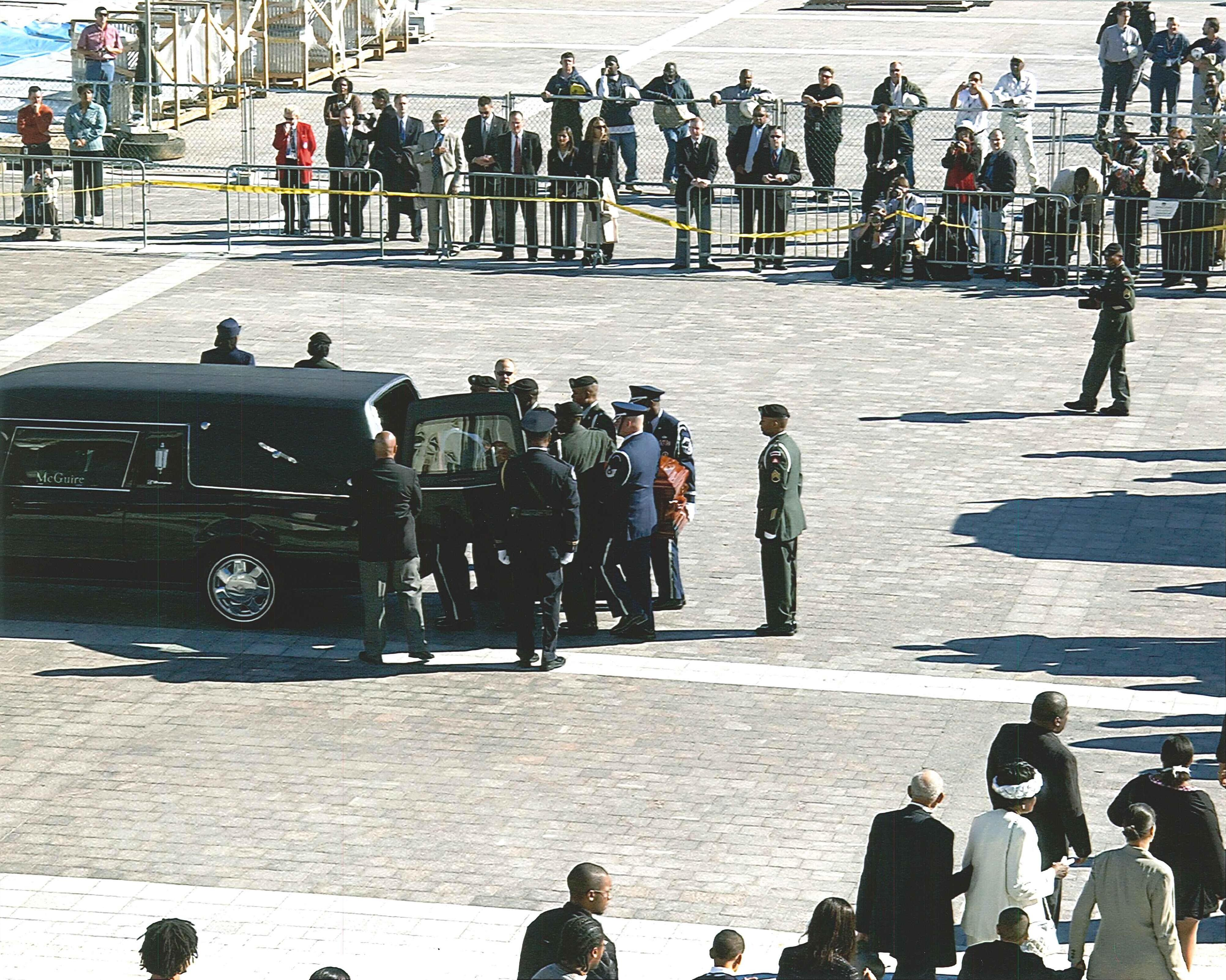

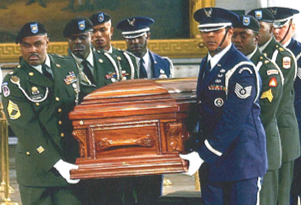

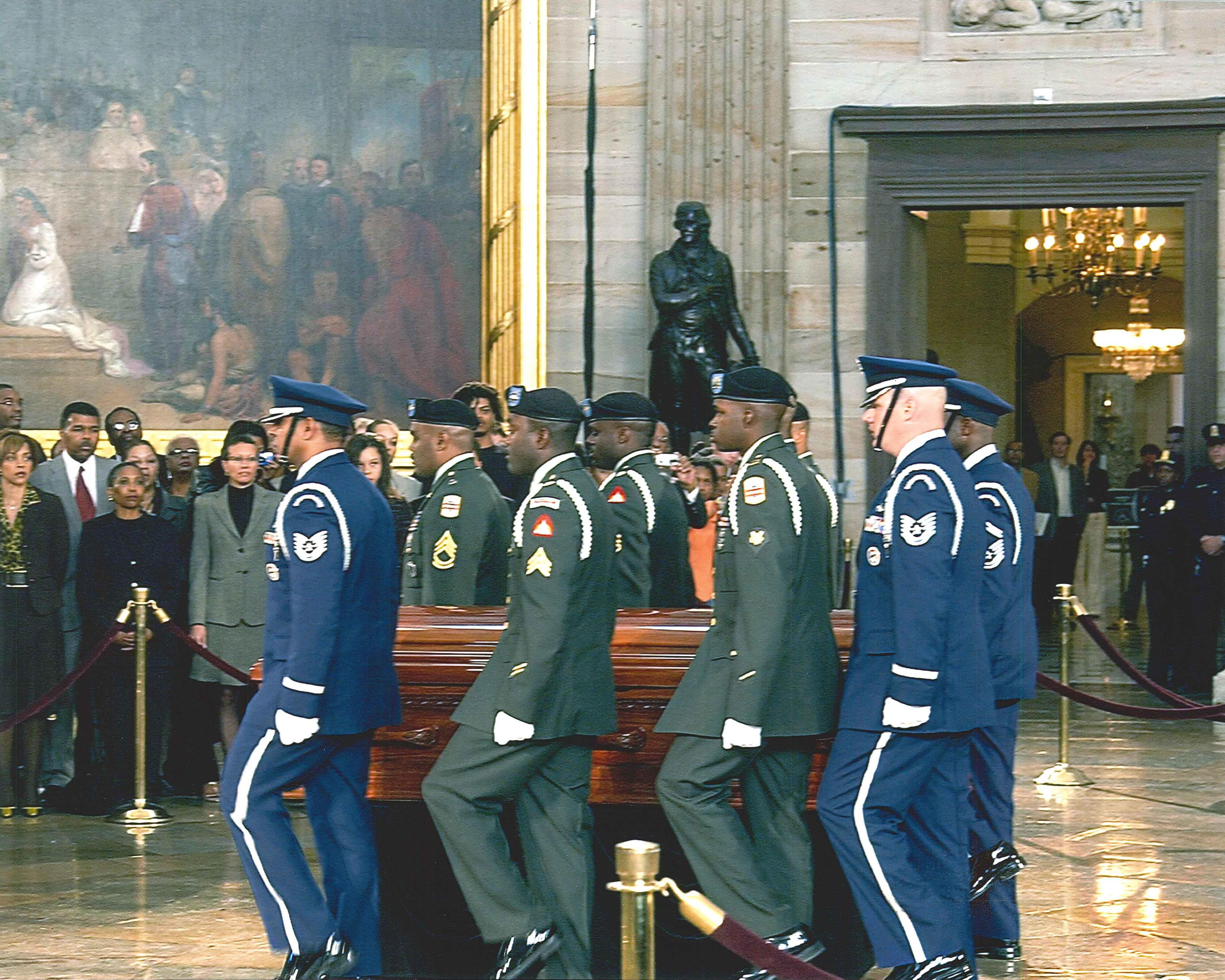

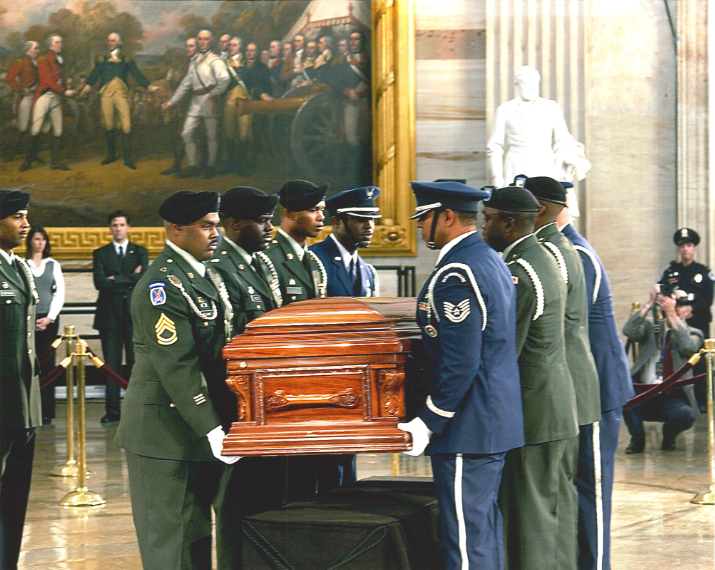

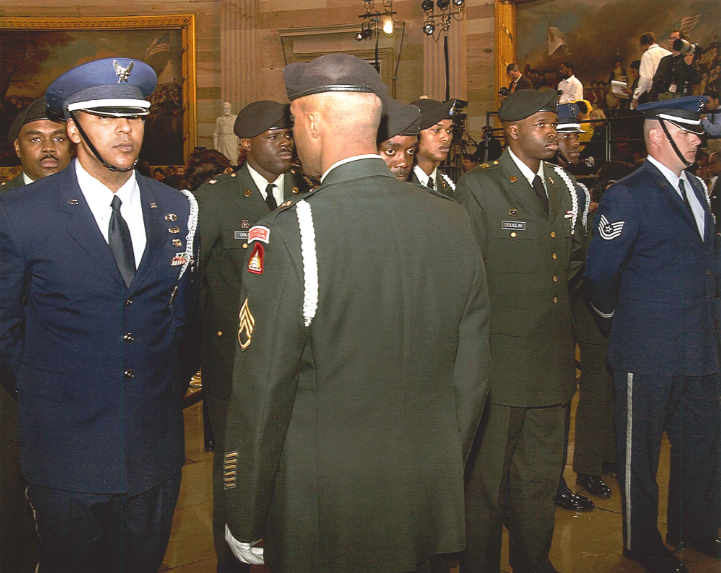

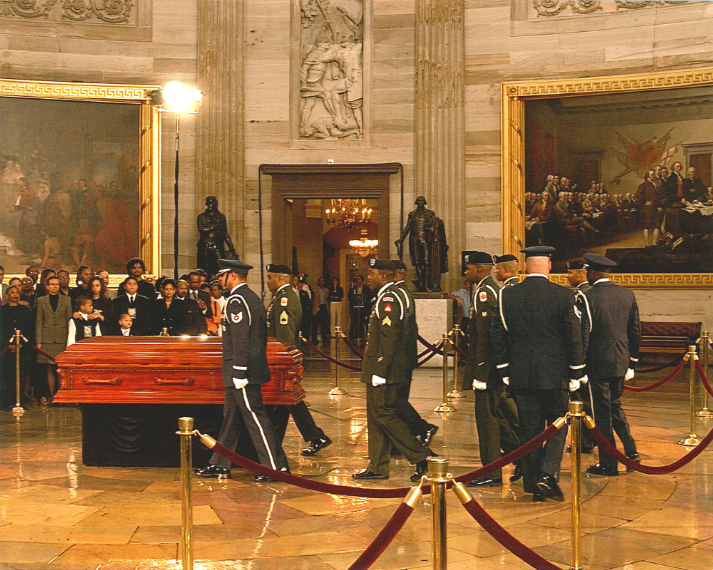

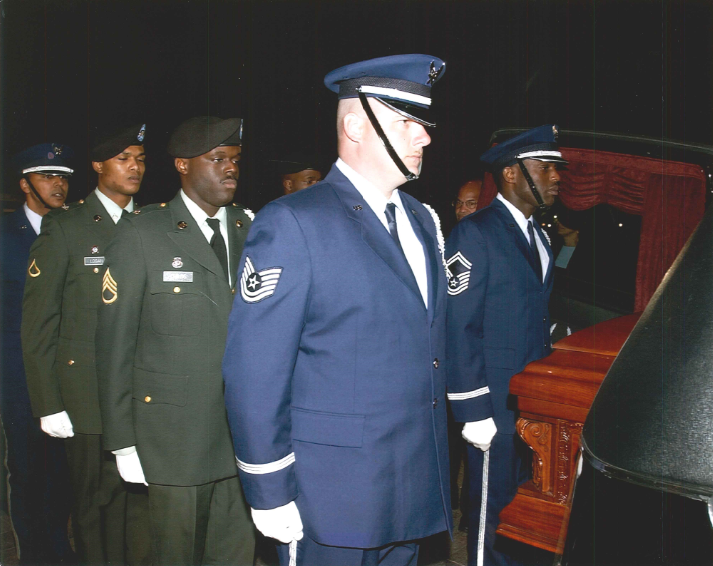

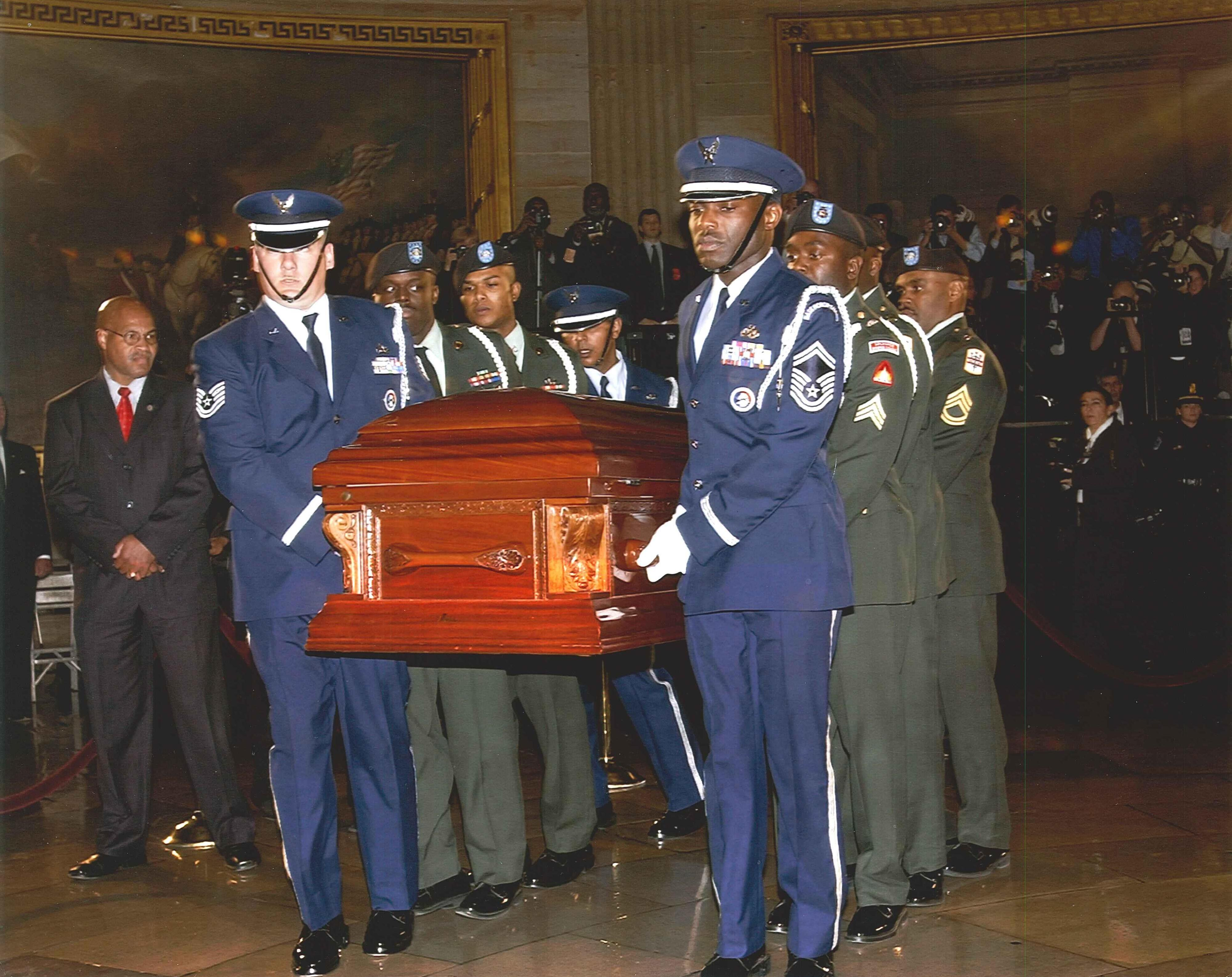

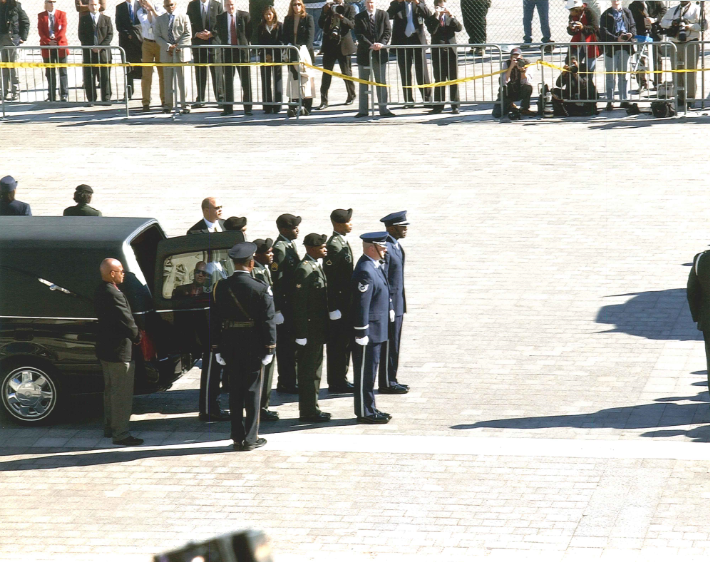

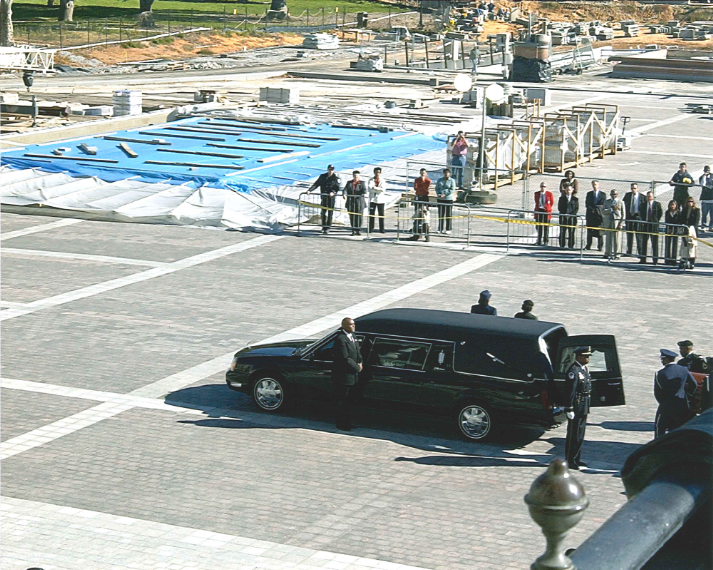

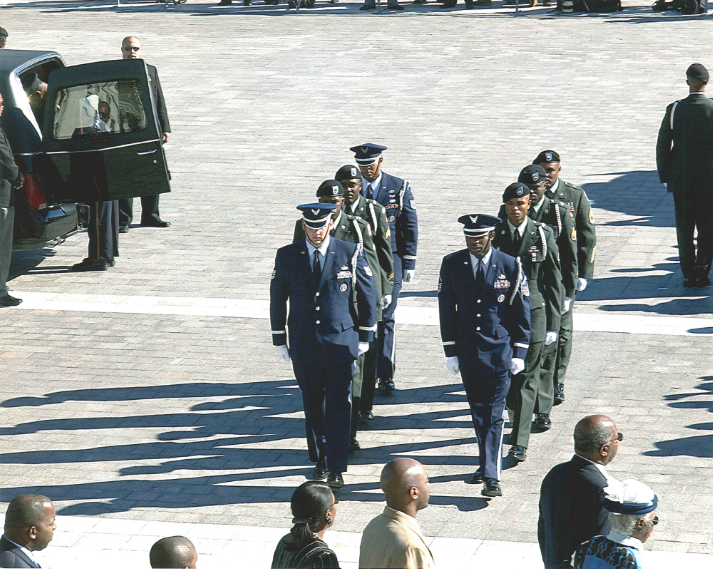

=== Ceremonial Participation ===
==== Memorial Day Ceremony ====
The pictures below depict the DCARNG Honor Guard participating in Memorial Day ceremonies, held at President's Park, in Washington, DC, during 2018 and 2019. The DCARNG Honor Guard supported the 1st Infantry Division's Memorial Day annual ceremony. In a few pictures shown below, Honor Guardsmen are playing "Taps", giving a three-volley salute, and standing ready to give military honors to fallen comrades.

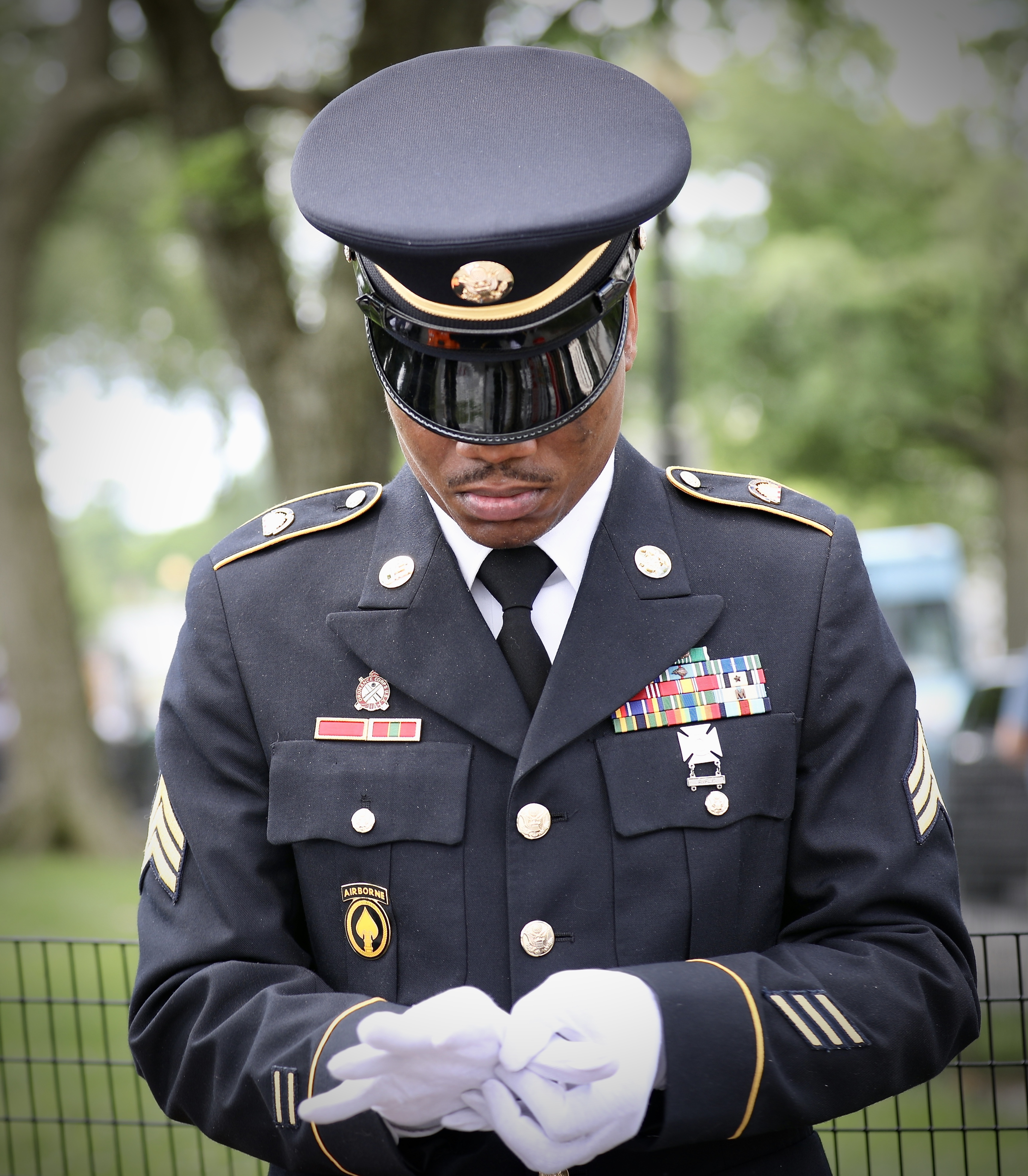

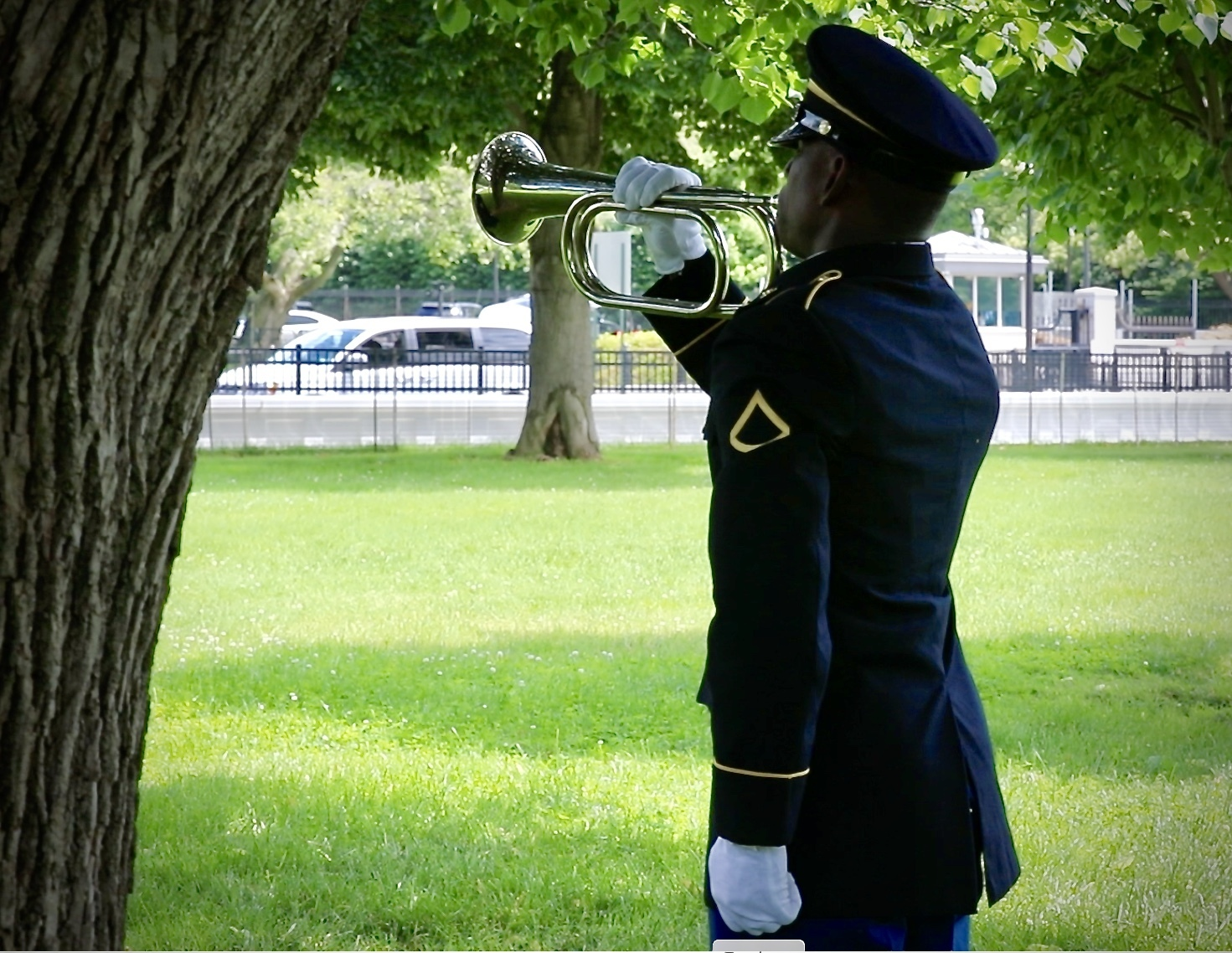

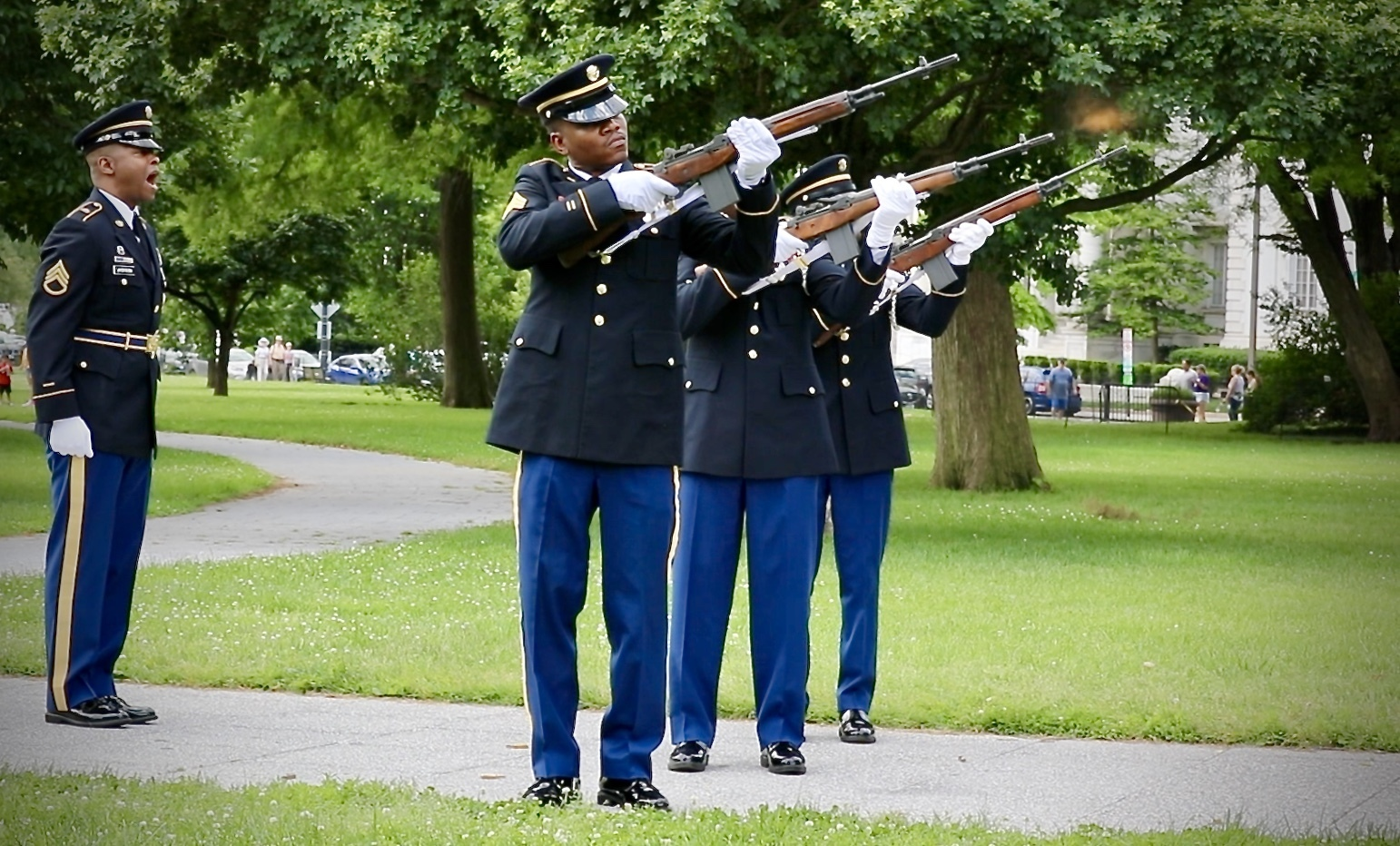

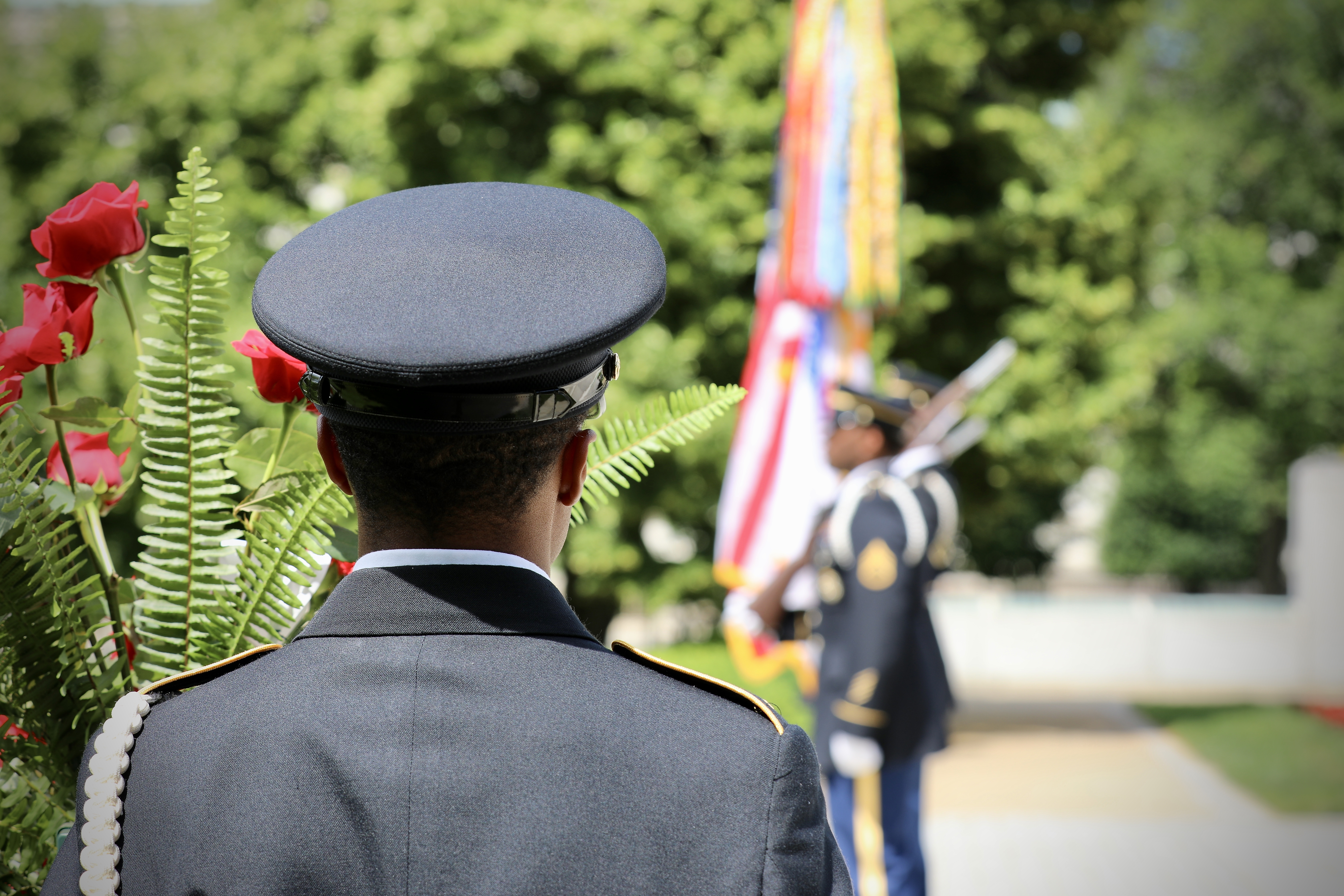

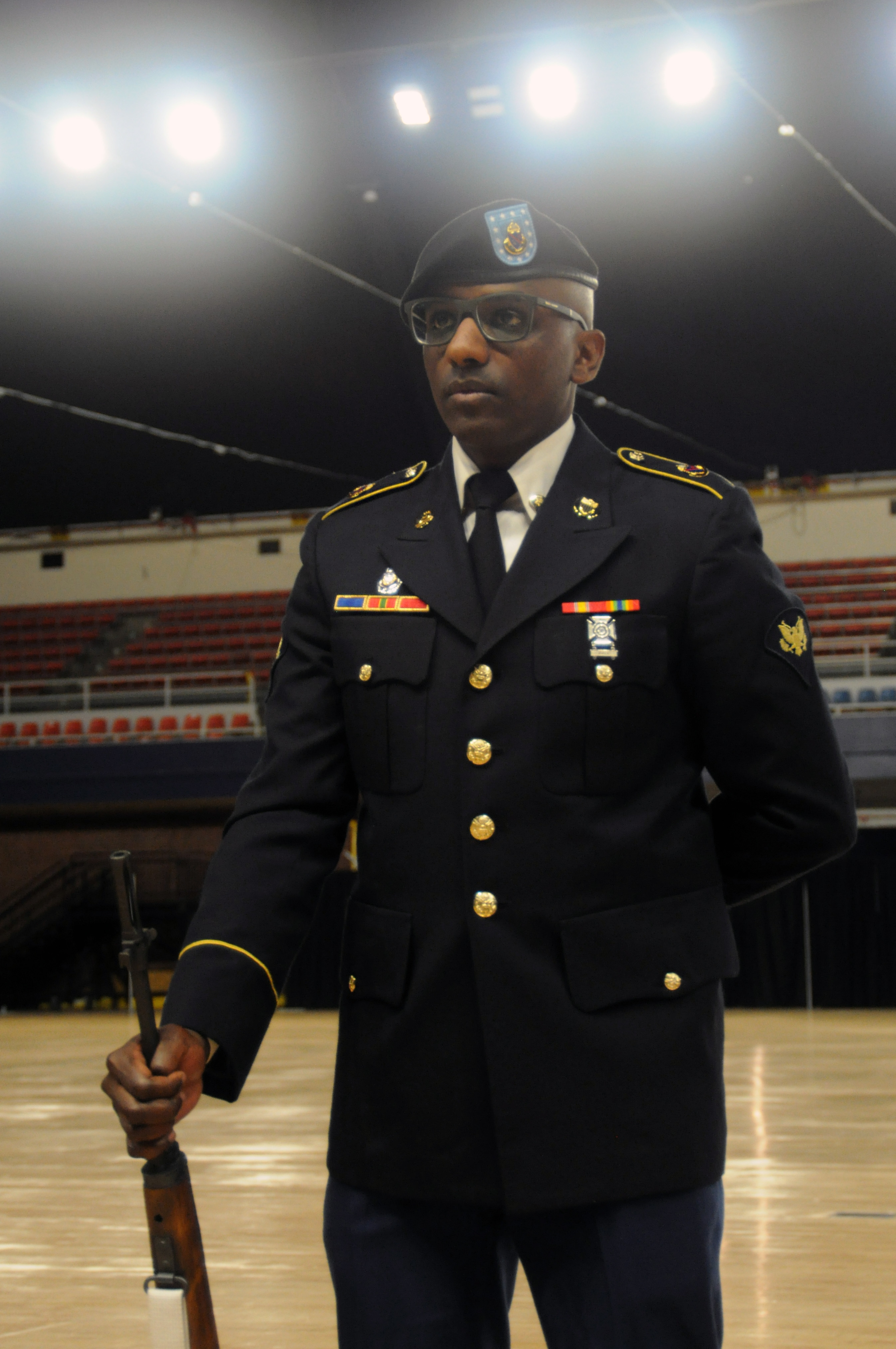

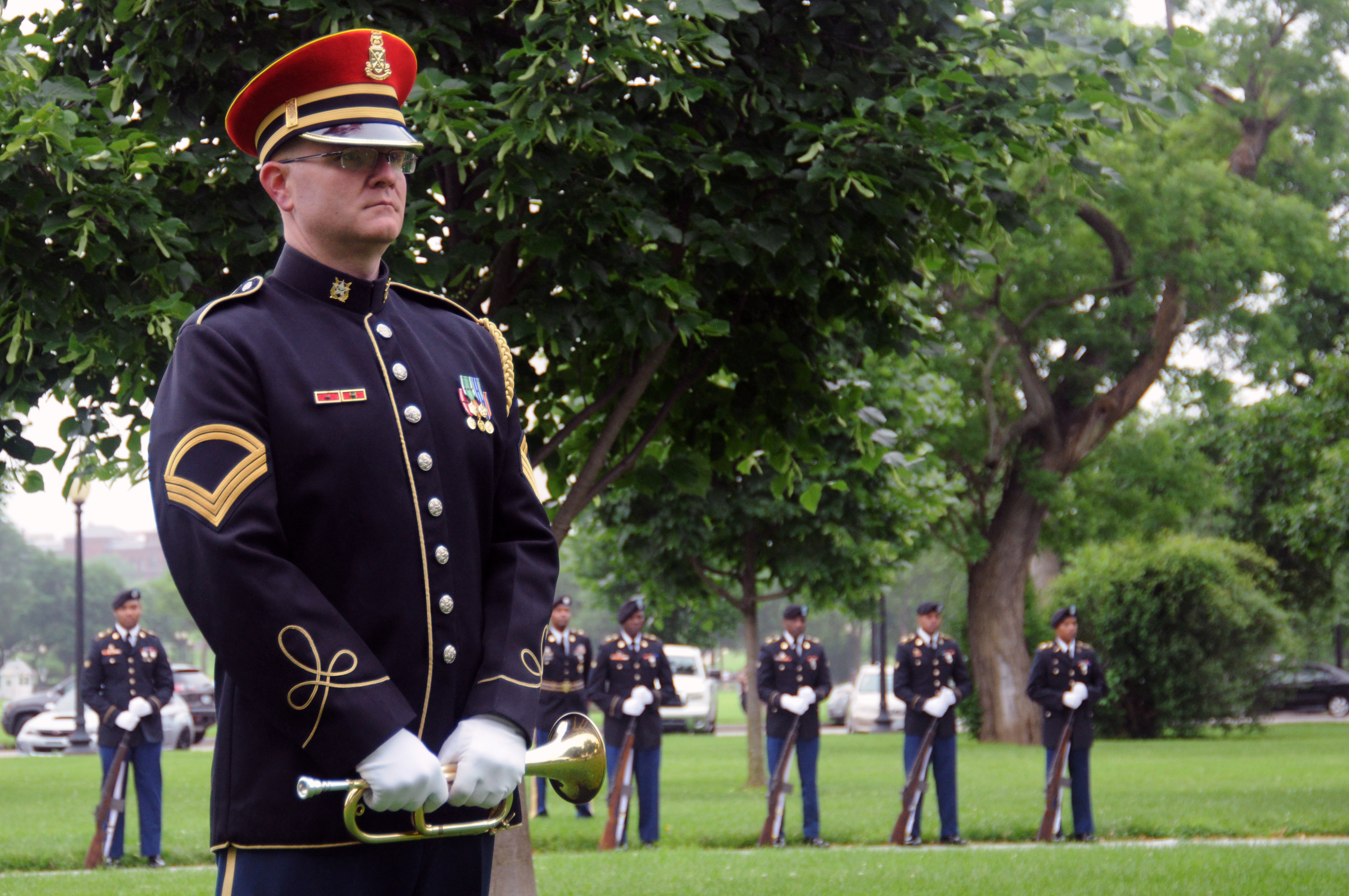

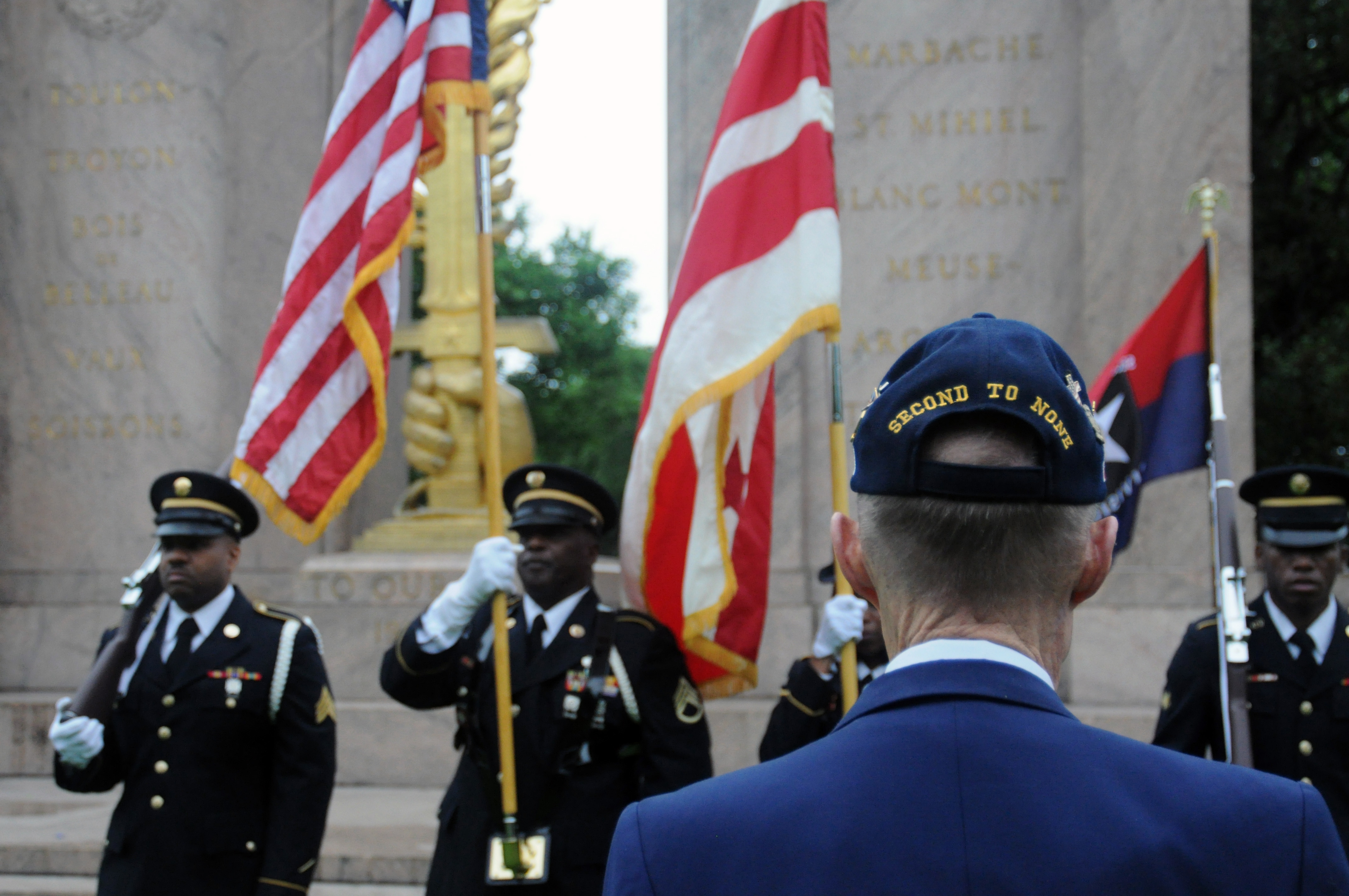

== See also ==
- Guardsmen and Airmen from DCNG participated in Rosa Parks Capitol Arrival - video
