= 260th Brigade =

260th Brigade may refer to:

- 260th Brigade, Royal Field Artillery, United Kingdom
- 260th Special Purpose Brigade, United States
