= 260th Military Police Command (United States) =

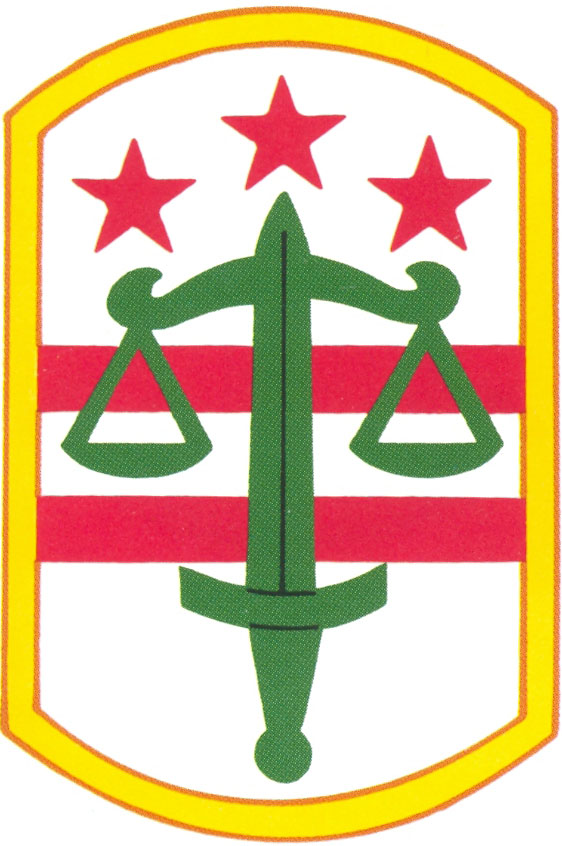
- Active: 1888-2011
- Country: United States
- Allegiance: District of Columbia
- Branch: Army National Guard
- Role: Military Police
- Size: Command (Brigade)
- Garrison/HQ: Washington, DC
- Motto: Peace Law Order

Insignia
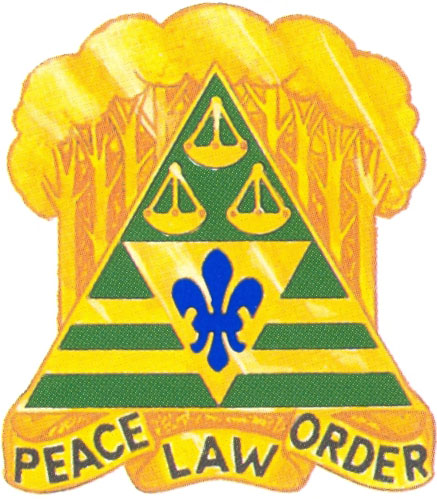
- 260th Military Police Command DUI

The 260th Military Police Command (260th MPC) was a unit of the District of Columbia National Guard until 2011.

== History ==
The unit has a long lineage beginning in 1888 when it was raised as Battery A, Light Artillery District of Columbia National Guard which was deactivated in 1900. The unit was redesignated 1st Battery, Field Artillery in 1903. It was reorganized in 1915 as Batteries A and B, Field Artillery.

The unit was federalized in 1916 at Fort Myer and reorganized several times for World War I service earning two battle streamers at St. Mihiel and Meuse-Argonne. It was mustered out in 1919 as a part of the 29th Infantry Division.

It became parts of the 60th Artillery and the 100th Artillery regiments ultimately becoming the 260th Coast Artillery. It was federalized for World War II service in 1941 serving first as coastal artillery and in 1943 as the 260th Antiaircraft Artillery Group.

After the war it was reorganized several times including in 1959 being redesignated HHC 260th Military Police Group. In 1985 the group was converted into the 260th Military Police Brigade. In 1992 the Brigade was converted into the 260th Military Police Command.

The command was deployed to the US Capitol in November 2001 to assist Capitol Police with round-the-clock patrols after the September 11 Attacks. The unit was deactivated in 2011.

In March, 2026, the 260th Special Purpose Brigade was established to continue the mission of the 260th MPC to coordinate the protection of the capital.
