= Aaron R. Dean II =

United States Army brigadier general

Aaron R. Dean, II
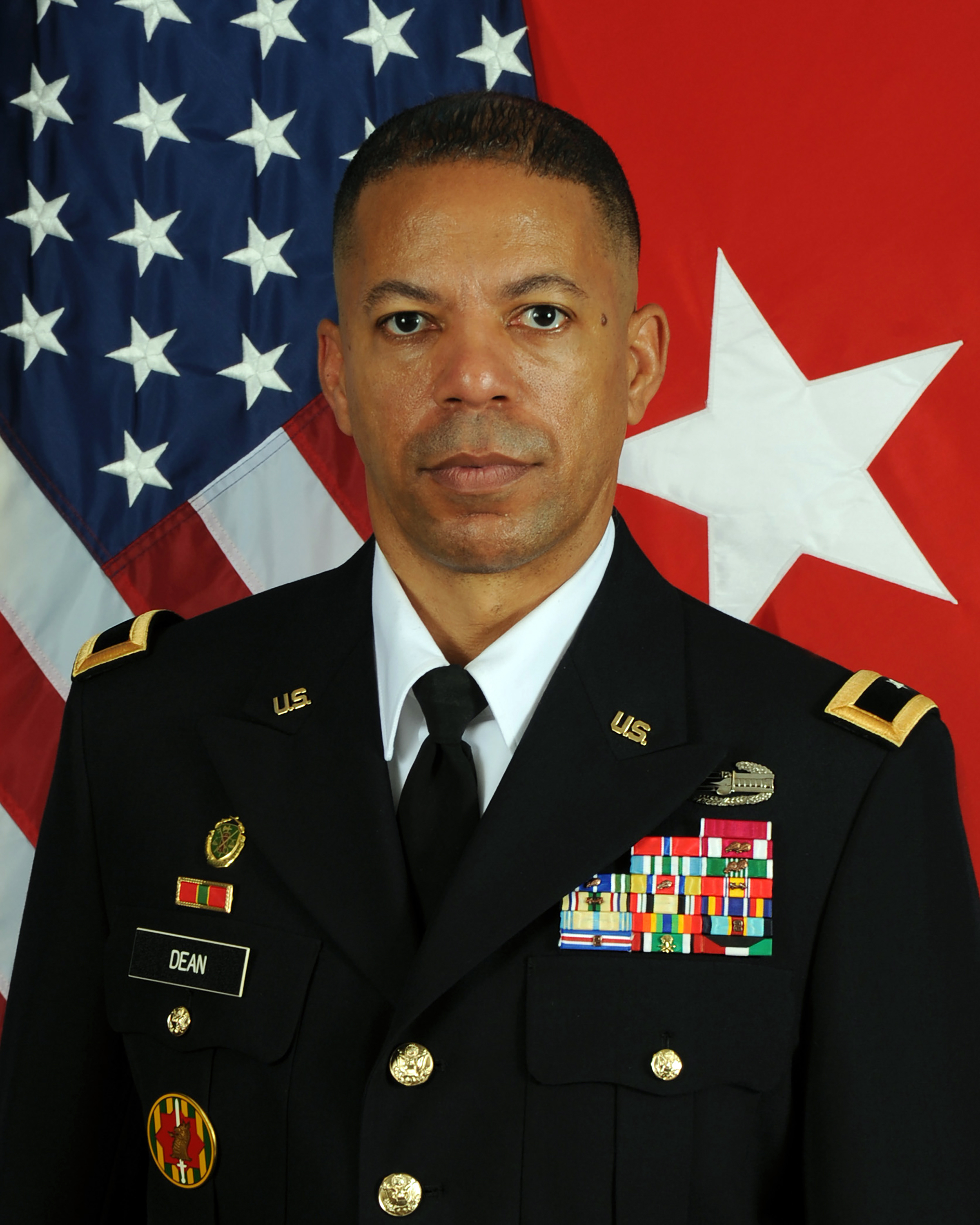
- Brigadier General Aaron R. Dean, II
- Born: May 20, 1964 (age 62); Fort Lewis, Washington
- Military career
- Allegiance: United States of America
- Branch: United States Army
- Service years: 1984–2024
- Rank: Brigadier General
- Commands: District of Columbia National Guard: Cdr, Land Component CMD: 2017; Cdr, 74th Troop CMD: 2011–2013; Cdr, 372nd MP BN: 2005–2006, Iraq War; Cdr, 274th MP CO: 1989–1992
- Conflicts: Operation Desert Storm; Iraq War
- Awards: Combat Action Badge; Legion of Merit; Bronze Star; (see awards section for additional)
- Website: Biography of BG Aaron R. Dean, II

Aaron R. Dean II (born May 20, 1964) is a retired United States Army brigadier general (BG) and the former adjutant general (TAG) of the District of Columbia National Guard (DCNG). As the TAG for the DCNG, Dean was responsible for providing personnel support to both Army and Air National Guard components. Dean acted as the auxiliary support to the commanding general of the DCNG, while concurrently carrying out many responsibilities associated with the District of Columbia's constitution and directives. In addition to this, he was responsible for managing the assets of the entire DCNG.

== Education ==
BG Dean received a Bachelor of Arts degree in criminal justice from Washington State University in 1987. He received two master's degrees. Dean received a Masters of Public Administration from Troy State University in 2002 and a Master of Science degree from the National Defense University within the school of National Security Strategy, in 2008.

List of military schools attended:

- National Defense University: 2008
- National War College: 2008
- Command General Staff College: 2000
- Combined Armed Services School: 1995
- Military Police Officer Advanced Course: 1994
- Military Police Officer Basic Course: 1987

== Military career ==
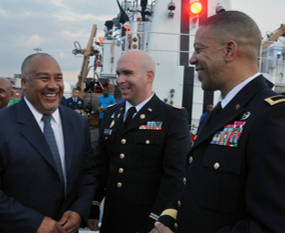
On the left, key leadership from the Jamaica State Partnership Program, and centered is MAJ Jason Hanslovan, bilateral affairs officer, DCNG, and BG Dean on the right. The three share a laugh while on board the U.S. Coast Guard Cutter Resolute in Kingston, Jamaica, March 19, 2018. (Photo by SPC Kevin Valentine, DCNG, 715th PAD ).

BG Dean received an Army ROTC Commission from the Washington State University in 1984. Upon commissioning, he was appointed to the Washington Army National Guard (WAARNG) as an Air Defense Section Leader.

Dean joined the DCNG in 1985. His first assignment as a commander came in 1989, with the 274th Military Police company. In the earlier part of 1991, the DCNG was mobilized along with other National Guard units in order to participate in the Persian gulf conflict. Captain (CPT) Dean, during that time period, along with other unit commanders within the DCNG, prepared many troops to participate in the battle to liberate Kuwait. This conflict occurred due to Iraq's refusal to respond to the United Nations (UN) deadline.

Dean continued to serve within the DCNG after the Persian gulf conflict. He was later assigned to serve as the commander for other units within the DCNG. Many of his other assignments are listed within the military assignments section on this page.

Dean supports numerous events and programs, such as -residential inaugurations, the DCNG Warrant Officer's 100-year history celebration event and critical partnerships, such as the Jamaica Defense Force and the Jamaica State Partnership Program. Dean was second in charge during the DC National Guard response to the January 6th Insurrection.

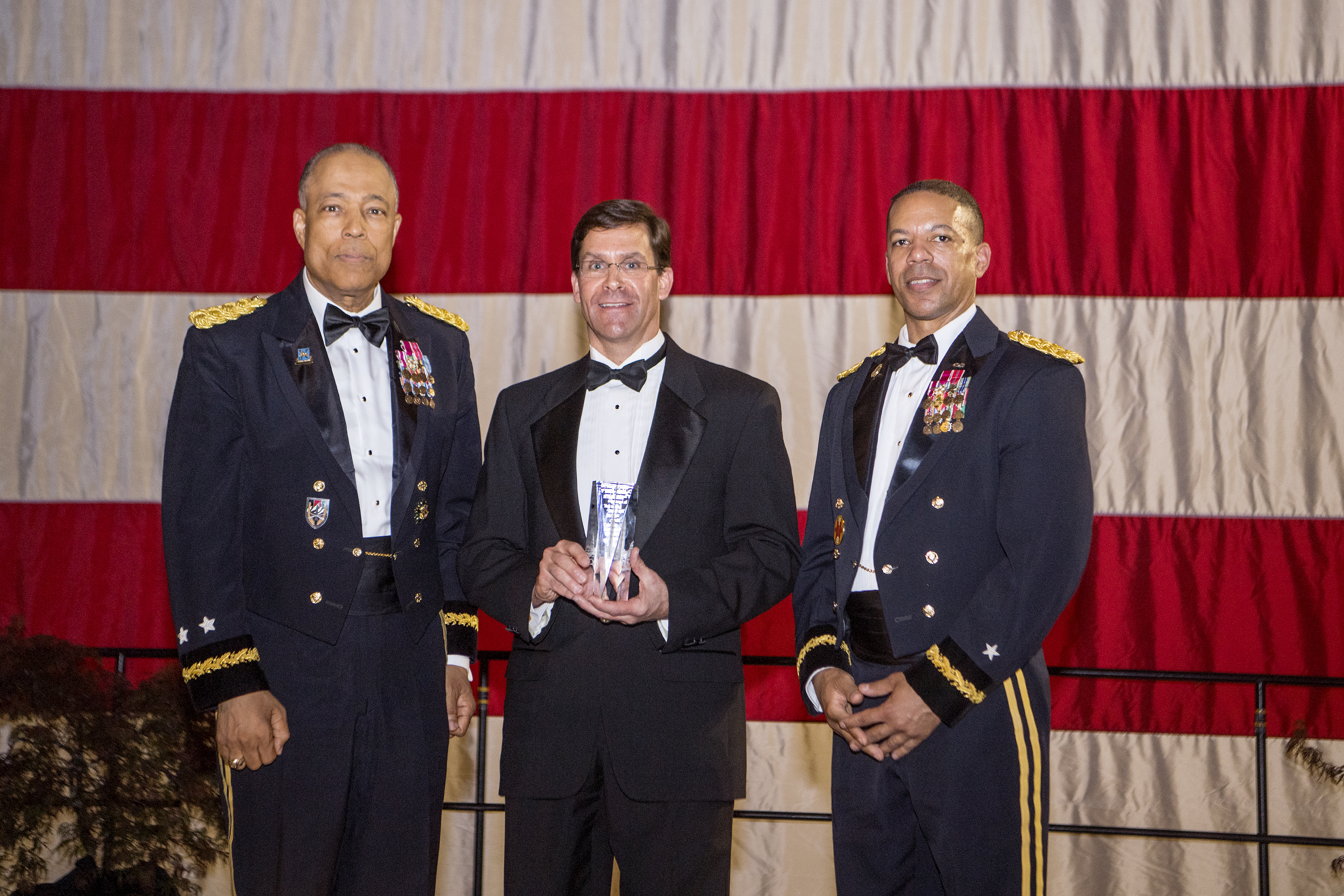
Secretary of the Army Mark T. Esper attends and speaks at the 2018 D.C. National Guard Military Ball, Washington, D.C., May 5, 2018. From left: Major General (MG) William J. Walker, Esper, and BG Aaron R. Dean II.

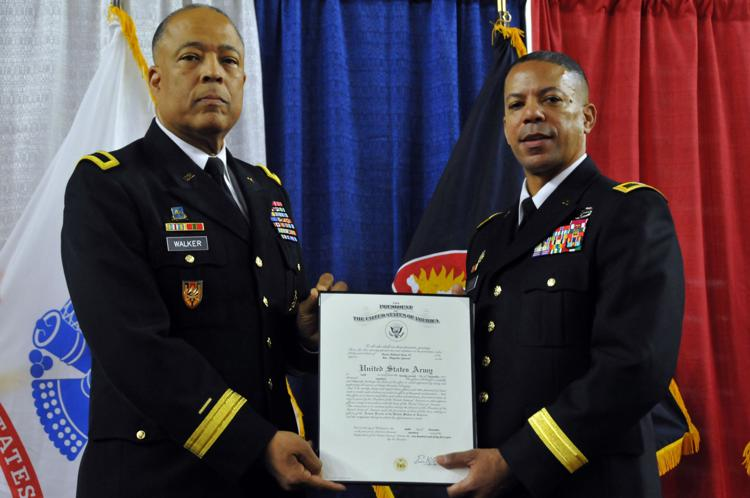
MG William J. Walker and BG Aaron R. Dean II at Dean's promotion ceremony, November 9, 2017, on the DCNG drill floor.

He retired in March 2024.

== Military assignments ==
- 2018–2024: The Adjutant General, DCNG, Washington, DC
- 2017–2018: Commander, Headquarters and Headquarters Detachment, Area Mobilization Command, Washington, District of Columbia
- 2017–2017: Commander, Land Component Command (Acting), DCNG, Washington, DC
- 2015–2017: Chief of Staff, DC Army National Guard, Washington, DC
- 2014–2015: G3, Deputy Chief of Staff for Operations, DCNG, Washington, DC
- 2013–2014: Director of Plans Operations and Training (J3), JFHQ-DC, DCNG, Washington, DC
- 2011–2013: Commander, 74th Troop Command, DCNG, Washington, DC
- 2009–2011: Director of Plans and Operations and Training (J3), Military Support, JFHQ-DC, DCNG, Washington, DC
- 2008–2009: Deputy J3, Armed Forces Inaugural Committee, DCNG, Washington, DC
- 2007–2008: National War College
- 2005–2006: Commander, 372nd Military Police Battalion (Combat Tour in Iraq)
- 2002–2004: Chief, Training Division, JFHQ-DC, DCNG, Washington, DC
- 2001–2002: Executive Officer, 372nd Military Police Battalion, DCNG, Washington, DC
- 1998–2001: Plans and Operations Officer, 260th Military Police Command, DCNG, Washington, DC
- 1996–1998: S-3, 372nd Military Police Battalion, DCNG, Washington, DC
- 1992–1996: Rear Battle Officer, 372nd Military Police Battalion, DCNG, Washington, DC
- 1989–1992: Commander, 274th Military Police Company (active duty Desert Storm)
- 1988–1989: Platoon leader, 273rd Military Police Company, DCNG, Washington, DC
- 1985–1988: Military police platoon leader Detachment 1, WAARNG

== Awards and decorations ==
BG Dean's federal awards include:

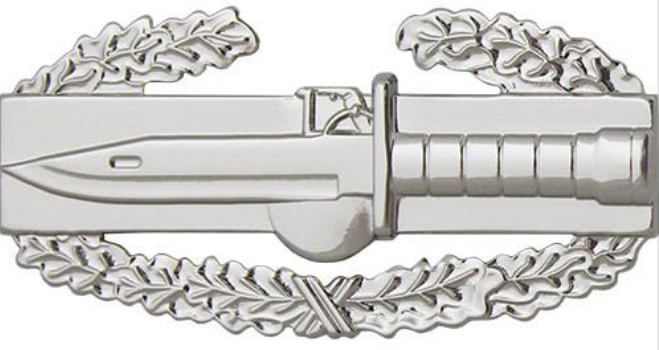
Combat Action Badge
- Army Superior Unit Award
- Legion of Merit
- Bronze Star
- Meritorious Service Medal with two oak leaf clusters (OLC)
- Joint Service Commendation Medal
- Army Commendation Medal with two OLC
- Army Achievement Medal with OLC
- Army Reserve Achievement Medal with one bronze OLC
- National Defense Service Medal with bronze star
- Southwest Asia Service Medal with campaign star
- Iraq Campaign Medal with campaign star
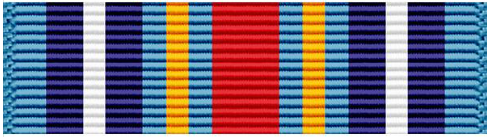
- Global War on Terrorism Expeditionary Medal
- Armed Forces Reserve Medal with bronze hourglass, 'M' device, and numeral two
- Army Service Ribbon
- Overseas Service Ribbon
- Army Reserve Component Overseas Training Ribbon
- Kuwait Liberation Medal Saudi Arabia
- Kuwait Liberation Medal Government of Kuwait

DCNG Awards:

- District of Columbia Distinguished Service Medal
- District of Columbia Meritorious Service Medal

BG Dean also received the Major General Charles Southward Leadership award and the Army Physical Fitness Badge.

== Dates of promotions ==
Promotions
Insignia	Rank	Date
	Brigadier General	September 22, 2017
	Colonel	May 3, 2011
	Lieutenant Colonel	January 28, 2003
	Major	April 27, 1998
	Captain	April 27, 1990
	First Lieutenant	July 25, 1987
	Second Lieutenant	July 27, 1984

== Civilian service ==
During his civilian service, BG Dean, served as the director of the Enrollment Division for Blue Cross and Blue Shield of the National Capital Area in Washington, D.C. The company is responsible for ensuring over 2 million people in the region. Dean also served on the school board, as the treasurer, for the Imagine Hope Public Charter School, located in D.C., during 2016-2017. He is currently a member of Kappa Alpha Psi fraternity.
