= District of Columbia Army National Guard =

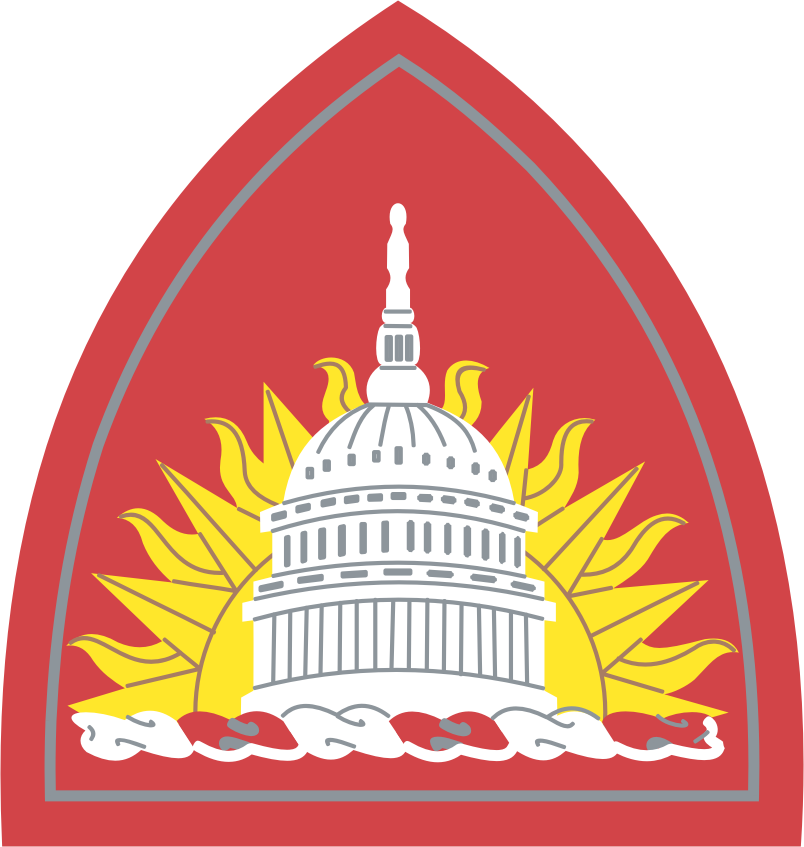
- Distinctive shoulder insignia
- Active: March 2, 1802 – present
- Country: United States
- Branch: United States Army
- Type: District Army National Guard
- Size: 1,350
- Part of: District of Columbia National Guard
- Garrison/HQ: D.C. Armory
- Anniversaries: March 3rd, 1802

Commanders
- Current commander: Brigadier General Robert K. Ryan

Insignia
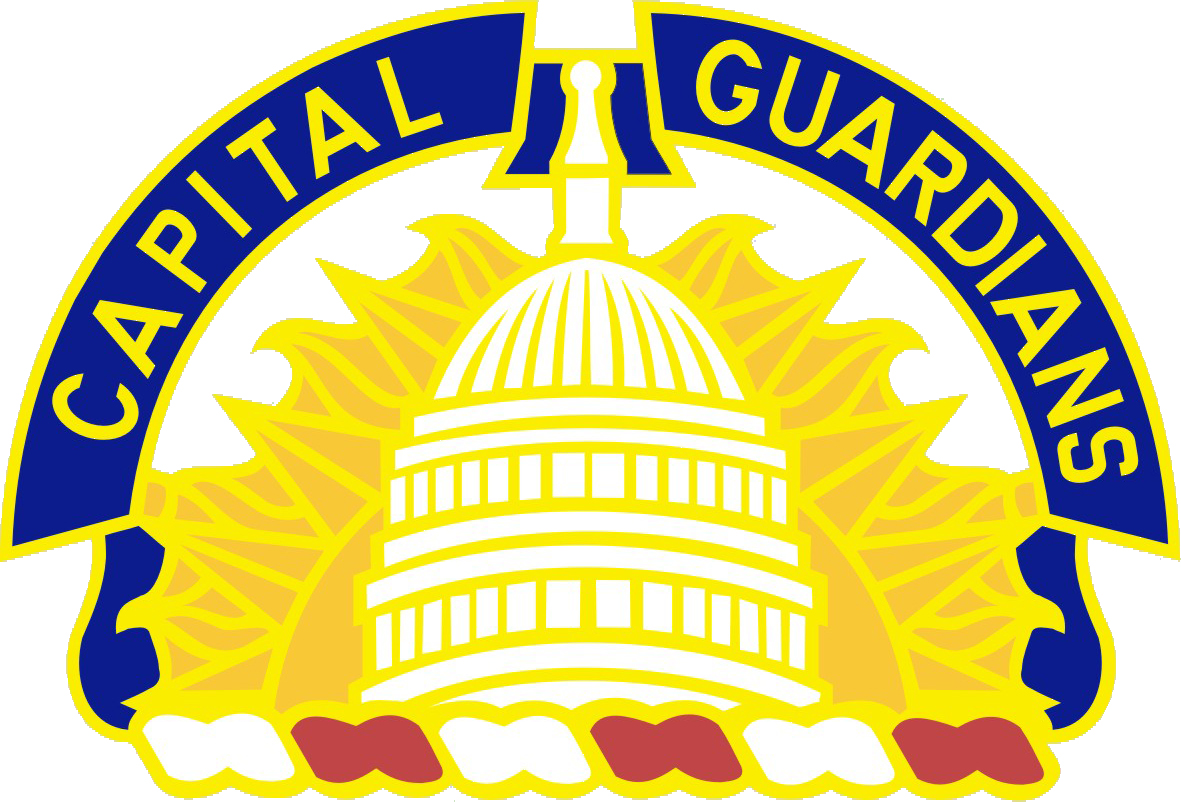
- District of Columbia National Guard STARC DUI

- District of Columbia National Guard Crest

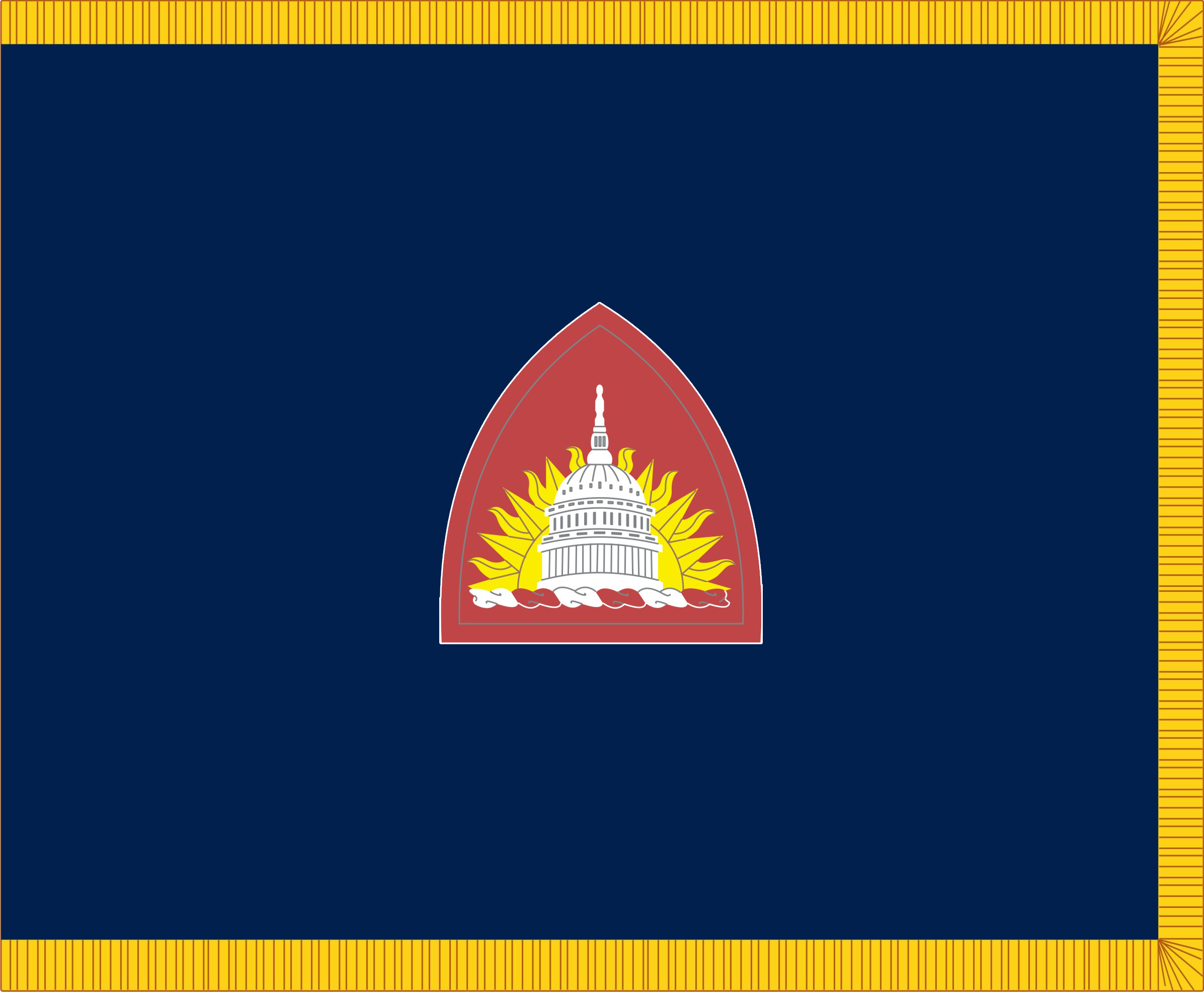
- District of Columbia National Guard Headquarters Flag

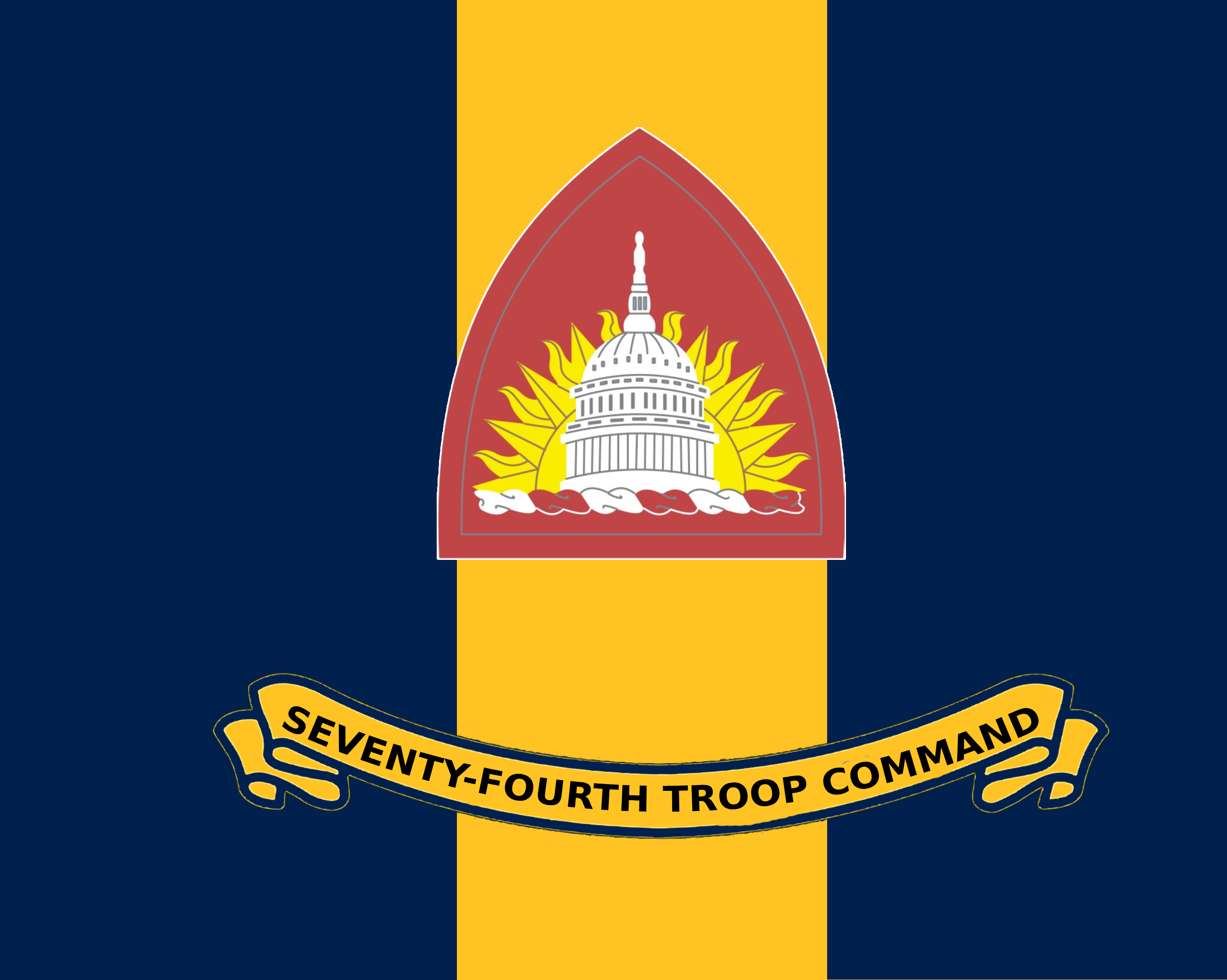
- District of Columbia National Guard 74th Troop Command Flag

The District of Columbia Army National Guard is the Army component of the District of Columbia National Guard. As the District of Columbia is a federal district and not a state, the guard is placed under the authority of the president of the United States, unlike most other National Guard units which are headed by their state's governor.

The District of Columbia Army National Guard was formed in 1802 by President Thomas Jefferson to defend the newly created District of Columbia. It has always been led by a Commanding General as opposed to an adjutant general and is the only Army National Guard state-level organization activated by the president of the United States for natural and civil emergencies. The mayor of the District of Columbia may request assistance of the National Guard assets for local purposes after consulting with the president.

District of Columbia Army National Guard units are trained and equipped as part of the United States Army. The same ranks and insignia are used and national guardsmen are eligible to receive all United States military awards. The District of Columbia National Guard also bestows a number of state awards for local services rendered in or to the District of Columbia.

== Organization ==
As of February 2026 the District of Columbia Army National Guard consists of the following units:

- Joint Force Headquarters-District of Columbia, Army Element
  - Headquarters and Headquarters Detachment, Joint Force Headquarters-District of Columbia, Army Element
  - Multi-Agency Augmentation Command
    - Headquarters and Headquarters Detachment, Multi-Agency Augmentation Command
  - District of Columbia Recruiting & Retention Battalion
  - 33rd Civil Support Team (WMD)
  - 257th Army Band
  - District of Columbia National Guard Honor Guard
  - Army Aviation Support Facility #1, at Davison Army Airfield
  - Company D (MEDEVAC), 1st Battalion (Security & Support), 224th Aviation Regiment, at Davison Army Airfield (UH-72A Lakota)
  - Detachment 1, Company A, 1st Battalion (Security & Support), 224th Aviation Regiment, at Davison Army Airfield (UH-72A Lakota)
  - Detachment 2, Company G (MEDEVAC), 2nd Battalion (General Support Aviation), 104th Aviation Regiment, at Davison Army Airfield (HH-60M Black Hawk)
  - Detachment 4, Operational Support Airlift Activity, at Davison Army Airfield (C-26E Metroliner)
  - Combined Support Maintenance Shop #1
  - Field Maintenance Shop #1
  - 74th Troop Command
    - Headquarters and Headquarters Detachment, 74th Troop Command
    - 104th Ordnance Company (Support Maintenance)
    - Company D, 223rd Military Intelligence Battalion (Linguist) (part of 300th Military Intelligence Brigade (Linguist))
    - 547th Transportation Company (Light-Medium Truck), at Joint Base Anacostia–Bolling
    - 715th Public Affairs Detachment
    - 1946th Financial Management Support Detachment
    - District of Columbia Medical Detachment
    - 372nd Military Police Battalion
      - Headquarters and Headquarters Detachment, 372nd Military Police Battalion
      - 273rd Military Police Company (Combat Support)
      - 276th Military Police Company (Detention)
  - 260th Regiment, Regional Training Institute, at Fort Belvoir (VA)
  - 260th Special Purpose Brigade, at D.C. Armory

== History, Lineage and Honors of the Headquarters, District of Columbia National Guard ==
Permanent Order 1-1. Approved 18 February 1986. Calvin G. Franklin, Commanding General

The District of Columbia National Guard traces its lineage to January 1776 as Headquarters 25th Battalion, Georgetown and Headquarters 29th Battalion, Bladensburg in the Maryland Militia before the District of Columbia was created. These initial units were mobilized in March and July 1776 to repel marauders. Mobilized January 1777 for services at Trenton and Princeton, and in October 1777 for combat service in Germantown.

In April 1781, the 25th Battalion remobilized for defense of the Potomac River Valley, and in May 1781 for defense of Georgetown. The unit saw further service at Fredericktown and Old Fort Frederick through 1781.

The Act of December 1793 reconstituted the 29th Battalion and officially recognized it on 18 June 1794 as the 14th and 18th Regiments, Maryland Militia, and Headquarters 4th Brigade, Maryland Militia, with headquarters in Georgetown.

=== Organization and history ===
The units were established as Headquarters, District of Columbia Militia by Act of the Congress in March 1802, and organized during May and June 1802 as a Brigade Headquarters. Reorganized by Act of the Congress 3 March 1803.

The Militia was mobilized in federal service from 1–4 July 1863 to resist Confederate forces. The unit was immediately demobilized after the fight was completed on 4 July 1863. Again, a year later the Federal government called upon the militia to resist Confederate attacks in July 1864 on the District of Columbia.

The unit was further reorganized under the Territorial Act of 1871 with the position of commanding general eliminated and the position of Adjutant General established as commander of military forces. However, 16 years later, in 1887 under the Act of 1803 the position of Commanding General was reestablished.

The Militia was reconstituted as the National Guard of the District of Columbia under the Act of the Congress, 1 March 1889 with the headquarters retaining the designation as Headquarters, District of Columbia Militia, with the command of the District of Columbia National Guard. The act specified that the unit have no more than twenty-eight companies of infantry organized into regiments, battalions, and unattached companies as may be deemed expedient; one battery of light artillery; one signal corps; one ambulance corps; one band of music; and one corps of field music.

The District of Columbia National Guard was brought into federal service April 1898 to fight in the Spanish–American War.

The organization of the District of Columbia National Guard modified by Act of the Congress, 11 May 1898 to provide for organization of a naval battalion to consist of not more than four companies of naval militia.

The DC National Guard was mustered into federal service at Fort Myer, Virginia 20 June 1916 to mobilize units for Mexican Border Service. However the units were soon discharged again on 21 October 1916. Furthermore, between 25 March 1917 and 25 July 1917, all elements and personnel, less headquarters mobilized for federal service. Their commanding general was later mustered into Federal service on 5 August 1917.

The unit was further Reorganized between October and December 1917 to include Companies A & B, 4th DC Infantry (units never established), and the 2nd Separate Battalion (Colored) to consist of retired and discharged veterans and exempt men to provide a “home guard” for the defense of the District of Columbia. Further reorganized on 5 March 1918 established the 5th DC Infantry and the 2nd Separate Battalion (Colored).

On 19 December 1919 the DC Guard was reorganized to consist of one battalion and two companies of infantry, one headquarters company, one field artillery battery, and one signal company. Only Headquarters, 5th Infantry and companies A and C were established. Furthermore, the Fifth Infantry was reorganized and redesignated 31 December 1920 as the Engineer Regiment (Federal recognition as 121st Engineers, 1 January 1921 creating a separate lineage). Reorganized 19 January 1922 with the 260th Coast Artillery (separate lineage) and elements of the 29th Division (separate lineages) added.

On 16 October 1923, the commanding general of the District of Columbia Militia was appointed, Commanding General, 29th Division with Headquarters, 29th Division allocated to the District of Columbia National Guard. However, the 29th Division transferred to the Maryland National Guard on 10 April 1934. From October 1940 until July 1941, the commanding general of the District of Columbia Militia was brought to active duty and appointed District of Columbia director of Selective Service. Soon however, the commanding general of the District of Columbia Militia was appointed Commander of the Washington Provisional Brigade (precursor of the Military District of Washington) in July 1941 serving in this capacity until May 1942 when appointed Provost Marshal of the District of Columbia (with jurisdiction over trial of five German saboteurs). He remained Provost Marshal until October 1942 when he was relieved from active duty and returned to command of the District of Columbia National Guard.

Supervision and control of District of Columbia National Guard passed from the president of the United States to the secretary of defense pursuant to Executive Order 10030, 26 January 1949 with authority given to the Secretary to designate officials of the National Military Establishment to administer affairs of the District of Columbia National Guard. The Secretary of the Army was directed to act for the secretary of defense in all matters pertaining to the ground component, and Secretary of the Air Force directed to act in all matters pertaining to the air component of the District of Columbia National Guard by Secretary of Defense memorandum, 2 February 1949.

By Act of the Congress, 2 September 1957 the commanding general of the Militia of the District of Columbia was authorized to hold the rank of major general or brigadier general.

The DC National Guard was placed into federal service from 5 to 16 April 1968 to aid civil authorities and again in May 1971.

=== Distinctive unit insignia ===
A gold color metal and enamel device consisting of the dome of the United States Capitol in white in front of a gold rising sun and supported by a torse of six twists alternately of white and red; on a blue scroll arched above the dome, the motto, Capital Guardians, in gold.

=== Symbolism ===
The dome of the United States Capitol typifies the District of Columbia. The rising sun is adapted from the District of Columbia Seal and signifies the ascendancy of the National Capitol and the country it represents. Because the District of Columbia lies within the original thirteen English Colonies, the twists of the wreath are accordingly in white and red.

=== Shoulder sleeve insignia ===
On a red three-sided background, the crest of the National Guard of the District of Columbia, proper. Approved 7 June 1948 by The Institute of Heraldry (TIOH).

=== Distinguished flag ===
A blue rectangular field, centered thereon the crest of the National Guard of the District of Columbia, proper. Below the crest, Headquarters, District of Columbia National Guard inscribed in blue on white ribbons edged in gold. Approved 1930 by TIOH.

=== History of the 260th Regiment ===
The 260th Regiment (United States) (Regional Training Institute)(formerly 260th Coast Artillery(?)) - Battery A, 110th Field Artillery, was demobilized 4 June 1919 at Camp Lee, Virginia. It was reconstituted 17 June 1924 in the DC National Guard, and concurrently consolidated with Battery D, 60th Artillery, 5th Company, Coastal Defenses of the Potomac, and Batteries B and C, 110th Field Artillery to form the 260th Coast Artillery. It was organized from 17 June 1924 to 1 April 1939, during which time its headquarters was federally recognized on 20 December 1935 at Washington DC. It was inducted into federal service on 6 January 1941 at Washington; but then HQ and HQ Battery, 260th Coast Artillery, was reorganized and redesignated HHB, 260th AAA Group, with the remainder of the 260th Coast Artillery from then on having a separate lineage. Inactivated 1944 in Texas; reorganized and federally recognized 3 October 1946 at Washington; ordered into active federal service 1950-52. Converted and redesignated 1 March 1959 as HHD 260th MP Group; reorganized and redesignated 1 March 1985 as HHC 260th MP Brigade. Became 260th Military Police Command 1 February 1992. 260th MP Command was active as late as September 2006 in the DC ARNG.

== See also ==
- District of Columbia National Guard
- District of Columbia Air National Guard
- 74th Troop Command
