= 260th Special Purpose Brigade =

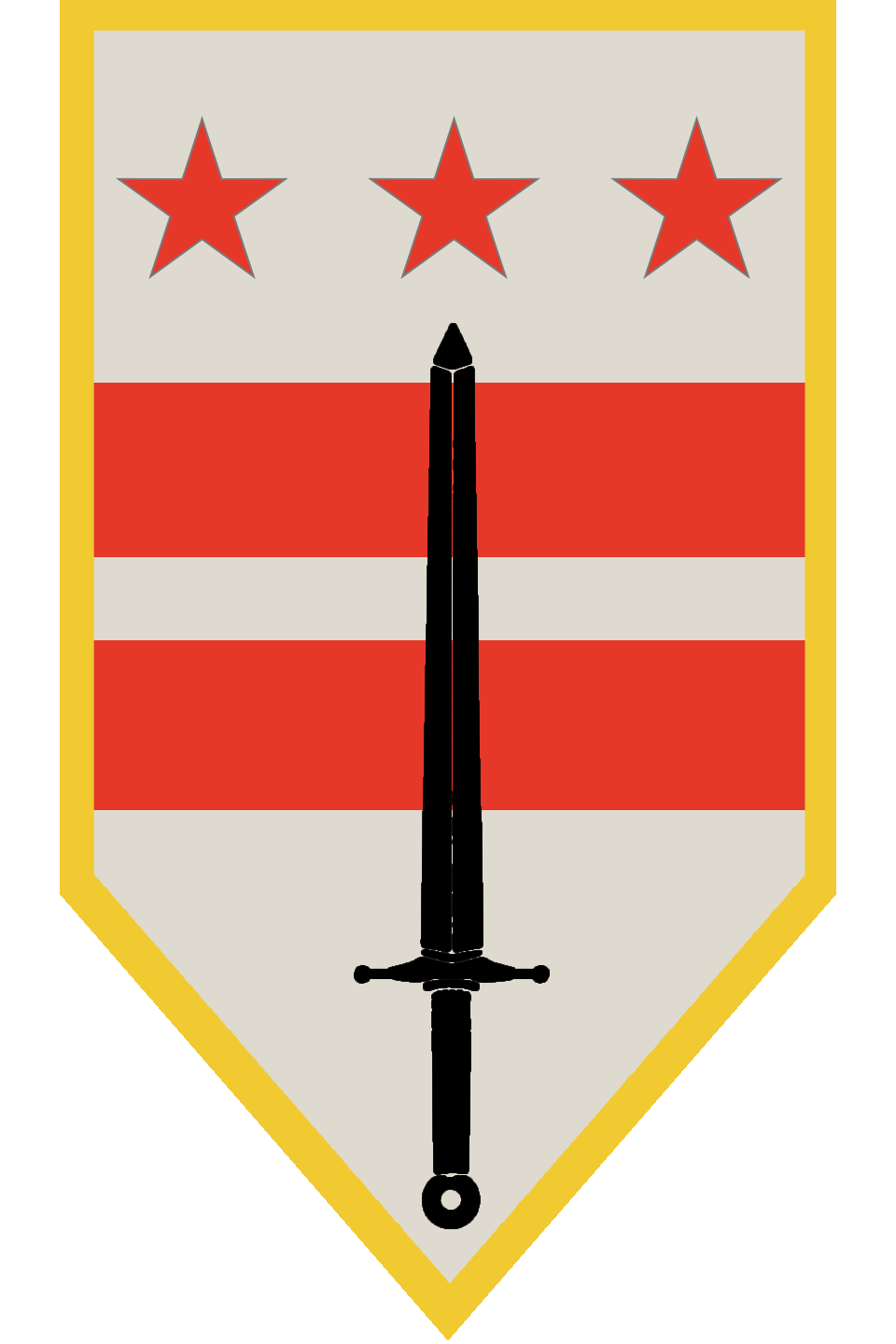
- Active: March 7, 2026 - present
- Country: United States
- Branch: United States Army National Guard
- Role: Special Purpose
- Size: Brigade
- Part of: District of Columbia Army National Guard
- Garrison/HQ: D.C. Armory, Washington, D.C.

Commanders
- Current commander: Col. Lawrence Doane
- Command Sergeant Major: CSM Kimberly Ricketts

The 260th Special Purpose Brigade is a unit of the District of Columbia Army National Guard that was activated at the D.C. Armory on March 7, 2026. The brigade was created in response to Executive Order 14339 to be the command-and-control headquarters for military and civil response to potential threats in the U.S. capital. The brigade will report directly to the U.S. president and not to the D.C. Mayor.

Col. Lawrence Doane will be the first commander of the new unit. The Department of Defense released a promotional video for the new unit on DVIDS in conjunction with the ceremony at the D.C. Armory.

The unit will partner with the U.S. Marshals Service and the District of Columbia National Guard.

In 2026, the 260 SPB added Polaris MRZR vehicles and a Harbor Security Boat (HSB) to its subordinate unit, the 547th Transportation Company. The new vehicles are intended to assist the brigade in enhancing security at events in the capital as well as providing assistance to law enforcement during emergencies.

== Insignia ==
The unit's insignia is designed on the coat of arms of George Washington. It is similar to the insignia used by its predecessor, the 260th Military Police Command, which was deactivated in 2011.
