= 74th Troop Command (United States) =

- District of Columbia District Area Command insignia
- Country: United States
- Allegiance: United States
- Branch: United States Army
- Type: Brigade Headquarters
- Part of: District of Columbia National Guard
- Garrison/HQ: Washington, DC

Commanders
- Current commander: Colonel Lawrence M. Doane

The 74th Troop Command is a brigade-level command of the District of Columbia Army National Guard that provides logistical and administrative support for nonorganic deploying MTOE units in the District that are not structured under another formation headquarters (HQ). It is the largest direct reporting unit in the District of Columbia Army National Guard. The Command is a subordinate of Joint Force Headquarters, District Area Command.

== Current mission ==
As a separate STARC headquarters detachment in accordance with National Guard Regulation 10–2, the primary mission of the 74th Troop Command is to command, control, and supervise Army National Guard units attached to the troop command and to provide manned, trained and equipped units capable of immediate expansion to war strength and available for service in time of war or national emergency or when appropriate to augment the active army.

== History ==
Comprising some of the most acclaimed units in the Army's rich history, the Command has heritage dating back to the DC Militia of the 18th century and its Revolutionary War roles. The command's subordinate units trace their roots back to the Civil War.

=== World War I to World War II ===
The DCNG's all black 1st Separate Infantry Battalion was one of World War I's most trusted fighting units. This unit became a part of the 372d Infantry Regiment, which fell under the French 157th "Red Hand" Infantry Division, and saw extensive combat in World War I. The 1st Separate Infantry was hand selected to be a part of the Red Hand Division because they were known as extremely loyal.

DC National Guard units also joined the neighboring 29th Infantry Division of the Virginia and Maryland National Guards throughout battles in World Wars I and II.

=== The Cold War Era ===
The 715th Truck Company saw combat in Korea. Naming their company orderly room "Blair House," they flew a DC flag over the Korean peninsula on 8 December 1951. 74th Troop Command heritage continued to deploy overseas to every major conflict in support of the United States Army throughout the Cold War era.

=== The Global War on Terror ===
Each MTOE unit within the 74th Troop Command has deployed, in some capacity (either as an organic element in its entirety, or in the form of a forward detachment), to the U.S. Central Command area of responsibility in support of Operations Enduring Freedom (OEF) and Iraqi Freedom (OIF).

All eleven individual units within the Command's current force structure have deployed more than half of their soldiers in support of OEF/OIF, making it the most deployed force in the DC National Guard.

== Organization ==
- 74th Troop Command
  - Headquarters and Headquarters Detachment, 74th Troop Command
  - 104th Ordnance Company (Support Maintenance)
  - Company D, 223rd Military Intelligence Battalion (Linguist) (part of 300th Military Intelligence Brigade (Linguist))
  - 547th Transportation Company (Light-Medium Truck), at Joint Base Anacostia–Bolling
  - 715th Public Affairs Detachment
  - 1946th Financial Management Support Detachment
  - District of Columbia Medical Detachment
  - 372nd Military Police Battalion
    - Headquarters and Headquarters Detachment, 372nd Military Police Battalion
    - 273rd Military Police Company
    - 276th Military Police Company
