= List of motions =

The following is a list of motions in parliamentary procedure and their classification according to authorities such as Robert's Rules of Order, The Standard Code of Parliamentary Procedure, and Demeter's Manual of Parliamentary Law and Procedure.

- Main motion

== Subsidiary motions ==
(Descending order of Precedence)§§§§§

Robert's Rules of Order Newly Revised (RONR)

- Lay on the table
- Previous question
- Limit or extend limits of debate
- Postpone to a certain time (or postpone definitely)
- Commit or refer
- Amend
- Postpone indefinitely

The Standard Code of Parliamentary Procedure (TSC)

- Postpone temporarily, or table
- Close debate
- Limit or extend debate
- Postpone to a certain time
- Refer to committee
- Amend

Demeter's Manual of Parliamentary Law and Procedure (Demeter)

- Lay on the table
- Previous question
- Limit or extend debate
- Postpone to a definite time
- Refer to a committee
- Amend the main motion
- Postpone indefinitely

== Privileged motions ==
(Descending order of Precedence)

RONR

- Fix the time to which to adjourn
- Adjourn
- Recess
- Raise a question of privilege
- Call for the orders of the day

TSC

- Adjourn
- Recess
- Raise a question of privilege

Demeter

- Fix the day to which to adjourn
- Adjourn
- Recess
- Raise a question of privilege
- Call for the orders of the day

== Incidental motions ==
(No order of Precedence)

- Point of order
- Appeal (motion)
- Suspend the rules
- Objection to the consideration of a question
- Division of a question
- Consideration by paragraph or seriatim
- Division of the assembly
- Motions relating to methods of voting and the polls
- Motions relating to nominations
- Request to be excused from a duty
- Requests and inquiries
  - Parliamentary inquiry
  - Request for information
  - Request for permission to withdraw or modify a motion
  - Request to read papers
  - Request for any other privilege

== Motions that bring a question again before the assembly ==
Bring a Question back motions (RONR)

- Rescind or amend something previously adopted
- Discharge a committee
- Reconsider
- Take from the table

Restorative motions (TSC)

- Amend a previously action
- Ratify
- Reconsider
- Rescind
- Resume Consideration

Restoratory motions (Demeter)

- Ratify
- Expunge
- Rescind
- Reconsider and Enter
- Reconsider
- Take from the table
