= Appeal (motion) =

In parliamentary procedure, a motion to appeal from the decision of the chair is used to challenge a ruling of the chair.

== Explanation and use ==
Appeal (RONR)
- Class: Incidental motion
- In order when another has the floor?: Yes, at time of appealed ruling
- Requires second?: Yes
- Debatable?: Yes, but debate on the motion must be confined to its merits only, and cannot go into the main question except as necessary for debate of the immediately pending question
- May be reconsidered?: Yes
- Amendable?: No
- Vote required: Majority in negative required to reverse chair's decision

The most common occasions for the motion to appeal are when the chair misassigns the floor or incorrectly recognizes a member; when the chair rules on a motion as not within the scope of the organization's purposes; when the chair rules on germaneness of an amendment; when they rule on points of order and questions of privilege; when they rule on the interpretation of words, phrases, provisions, etc.; and when the chair misapplies the rules of a motion (especially in reference to the rankings of motions).

According to Robert's Rules of Order Newly Revised (RONR), members have no right to criticize a ruling of the chair unless they appeal from their decision. Demeter's Manual of Parliamentary Law and Procedure states that an appeal "protects the assembly against the arbitrary control of the meeting by its presiding officer." Mason's Manual of Legislative Procedure states, "In some states the ruling of the chair by tradition is given great weight, and appeals are not made lightly." RONR states that in some cases, the chair may welcome an appeal because it takes the onus off of them.

An appeal must be made at the time of the chair's ruling. After any debate or other business, it is too late to make an appeal.

In stating the appeal, the presiding officer uses the form, "Those in favor of sustaining the decision of the chair..." rather than a biased form such as "Those in favor of sustaining the bylaws..." Appeals are debatable unless they relate to indecorum, the priority of business, or an undebatable question. According to The Standard Code of Parliamentary Procedure, if the reasons given for the appeal are convincing, the presiding officer may change their ruling accordingly, in which case the appeal is automatically dropped.

== Improper uses ==
RONR states that "when the chair rules on a question about which there cannot possibly be two reasonable opinions, an appeal would be dilatory and is not allowed." Demeter's Manual recommends using the mnemonic devices F, T, R, L and J, O, D to remember that no appeals can be taken from the chair's rulings which arise out of known Facts, evident Truths, established Rules or operative Laws, but can be taken only from rulings which are based on their personal Judgment, Opinion or Discretion. Demeter explains:

...should you waste the assembly's time or affront its intelligence by submitting such absurd appeals to the members to back up your rulings – that there are seven days in the week, or twelve months in the year, or the main motion can be debated, or any other law or rule, or any self-evident and incontestable facts?

An assembly cannot contravene a bylaws provision by raising an appeal and voting to interpret the provision to mean something different than its clear meaning. If such an appeal is moved, the chair should rule it out of order immediately, without opening it to debate or putting it to a vote.

== See also ==
- Nuclear option
- Point of order
