= Objection to the consideration of a question =

Type of motion in parliamentary procedure

Objection to the consideration of a question (RONR)
- Class: Incidental motion
- In order when another has the floor?: When another has been assigned the floor, until debate has begun or a subsidiary motion has been stated by the chair
- Requires second?: No
- Debatable?: No
- May be reconsidered?: Negative vote (sustaining objection) only
- Amendable?: No
- Vote required: Two-thirds against consideration sustains objection

In parliamentary procedure, an objection to the consideration of a question is a motion that is adopted to prevent an original main motion from coming before the assembly. This motion is different from an objection to a unanimous consent request.

== Explanation and use ==
If a member feels that an original main motion should not be considered, an objection to the consideration of a question could be made. It is often used to prevent an embarrassing question from being introduced and debated in the assembly.

According to Robert's Rules of Order Newly Revised (RONR), this motion is not debatable and requires a two-thirds vote against consideration. This objection may be applied only to an original main motion, that is, a motion that brings a new substantive issue before the assembly. The objection may be raised only before debate has begun on the motion, as the purpose is to completely suppress debate on the motion.

According to Mason's Manual of Legislative Procedure, the purpose of the objection to consideration is to bar from discussion or consideration "any matter that is considered irrelevant, contentious or unprofitable, or that, for any reason, is thought not advisable to discuss."

This motion is different from an objection to a unanimous consent request.

The Standard Code of Parliamentary Procedure does not have this motion and provides alternative motions for accomplishing the same purpose.

== Improper use of tabling a motion ==
Using the rules in RONR, a main motion is improperly killed by tabling it. In this case, before debate has begun, it would have been proper to make an objection to the consideration of the question.

== See also ==
- Debate (parliamentary procedure)
- Postpone indefinitely
- Previous question
- Table (parliamentary procedure)
