= Adjournment =

Parliamentary procedure to officially end a meeting

In parliamentary procedure, an adjournment ends a meeting. It could be done using a motion to adjourn. A time for another meeting could be set using the motion to fix the time to which to adjourn.

== Law ==
In law, to adjourn means to suspend or postpone a proceeding.

== Parliamentary procedure ==
In deliberative assemblies, an adjournment ends a meeting. Under Robert's Rules of Order Newly Revised (RONR), if no time or method has been fixed to reconvene the assembly, the adjournment has the effect of dissolving the body.

=== Motion to adjourn ===
Adjourn (RONR)
- Class: Privileged motion
- In order when another has the floor?: No
- Requires second?: Yes
- Debatable?: No
- May be reconsidered?: No
- Amendable?: No
- Vote required: Majority

A motion to adjourn is a privileged motion, unless it is qualified in any way (such as "adjourn at 10 p.m."), the time for adjourning is already established, or unless adjournment would dissolve the assembly (in these cases, it is a main motion). The privileged motion to adjourn is used to end the meeting immediately without debate. If it is a main motion, it cannot interrupt pending business, and is amendable and debatable.

If there is any unfinished business at the time of adjournment, it is carried over to the next meeting if that meeting is within a quarterly time interval.

When a body has completed the scheduled order of business at a meeting and there is no further business for the assembly to consider at that time, the chair may simply declare the meeting adjourned without a motion having been made.

Along with the motion to fix the time to which to adjourn, recess, and taking measures to obtain a quorum, it is one of the only motions allowed in the absence of a quorum.

The Standard Code of Parliamentary Procedure (TSC) treats the motion to adjourn as a privileged motion but under fewer circumstances. Like RONR, TSC considers it a privileged motion (and thus non-debatable) when business is pending. As a privileged motion, however, TSC allows the motion to be amended to a limited extent to establish the time when the interrupted meeting will continue. Unlike under RONR, however, it is considered a main motion (debatable and amendable) when no business is pending.

=== Motion to Fix the time to which to adjourn ===
Fix the time to which to adjourn (RONR)
- Class: Privileged motion
- In order when another has the floor?: No
- Requires second?: Yes
- Debatable?: No
- May be reconsidered?: Yes
- Amendable?: Yes
- Vote required: Majority

The motion to fix the time to which to adjourn is used to set the time (and possibly the place) for another meeting to continue business of the session. If it is moved while a question is pending, it is the highest ranking privileged motion. Otherwise, it is an incidental main motion.

=== Adjourned meeting ===
An adjourned meeting is a term used in parliamentary procedure to mean a meeting that is continued from the previous meeting. The motion to fix the time to which to adjourn sets up an adjourned meeting, which is part of the same session (series of related meetings).

Despite the name, an adjourned meeting is not related to the act of adjourning (i.e. "an adjourned meeting" does not mean "a meeting that has been adjourned"). To reduce this confusion, an adjourned meeting is sometimes called a "continued meeting".

An adjourned meeting is set up to complete the business of the assembly. After an adjourned meeting is scheduled, an item of business could be postponed to that meeting.

The adjourned meeting must be scheduled before the next regular meeting of the assembly.

== United States Congress ==
In the United States Congress, an adjournment of more than three days requires the consent of both houses (the United States Senate and the United States House of Representatives).

=== Controversial adjournment ===
In March 1835, there was controversy on whether Congress could stay in session past the end of the term without adjourning. It was debated on whether the motion to adjourn was valid. Eventually there was an adjournment. This issue was resolved when the Twentieth Amendment to the United States Constitution set a specific date and time for the start of a new session.

== See also ==
- Adjournment debate
- Adjournment sine die
- Recess (motion)
