= Raise a question of privilege =

Motion in parliamentary procedure

Raise a question of privilege (RONR)
- Class: Privileged motion
- In order when another has the floor?: Yes, but should not interrupt a person who has begun to speak, unless unavoidable
- Requires second?: No, but if the question of privilege thereby raised is in the form of a motion, the motion must be seconded
- Debatable?: No
- May be reconsidered?: No
- Amendable?: No
- Vote required: Admissibility of question is ruled upon by chair

In parliamentary procedure, a motion to raise a question of privilege is a privileged motion that permits a request related to the rights and privileges of the assembly or any of its members to be brought up.

== Explanation and use ==
In Robert's Rules of Order Newly Revised (RONR), questions of privilege affecting the assembly may include matters of comfort, amplification, or safety. For example, it may be difficult to hear the speaker. In this case, a question of privilege could be raised to close the doors and windows. A question of privilege can only be interrupted by the motions to take a recess, adjourn, or fix the time to which to adjourn, or any incidental motions that must be disposed of at that time.

An example of a question of privilege is a motion to go into executive session. A question of privilege cannot interrupt a vote or the verification of a vote.

When a question of privilege affects a single member (rather than the entire assembly), it is called a question of personal privilege. Such a question may include a need for assistance, to be excused for illness or personal emergency, or the need to immediately answer a charge of misconduct made by another member. The member rises immediately and without waiting to be recognized states, "Mr. Chairman, I rise on a question of personal privilege," or similar words. If the member has interrupted a speaker, the chair must determine if the matter is of such urgency as demands immediate attention; otherwise, the member will have the floor immediately after the current speaker is finished. According to RONR, questions of personal privilege "seldom arise in ordinary societies and even more rarely justify interruption of pending business".

A question of privilege (not personal) has precedence over questions of personal privilege, should they conflict.
