= Voting methods in deliberative assemblies =

Methods of voting on motions

Deliberative assemblies – bodies that use parliamentary procedure to arrive at decisions – use several methods of voting on motions (formal proposal by members of a deliberative assembly that the assembly take certain action). The regular methods of voting in such bodies are a voice vote, a rising vote, and a show of hands. Additional forms of voting include a recorded vote and balloting.

== Regular methods ==
=== Voice vote ===
Robert's Rules of Order Newly Revised (RONR) states that a voice vote (viva voce) is the usual method of voting on any motion that does not require more than a majority vote for its adoption. It is considered the simplest and quickest of voting methods used by deliberative assemblies. The chair of the assembly will put the question to the assembly, asking first for those in favor of the motion to indicate so verbally ("aye" or "yes"), and then ask those opposed to the motion to indicate so verbally ("no"). The chair will then estimate which side had more members.

=== Rising vote ===
A simple rising vote (in which the number of members voting on each side rise to their feet) is used principally in cases in which the chair believes a voice vote has been taken with an inconclusive result, or upon a motion to divide the assembly. A rising vote is also often the normal method of voting on motions requiring a two-thirds vote for adoption. It can also be used as the first method of voting when only a majority vote is required if the chair believes in advance that a voice vote will be inconclusive. The chair can also order the rising vote to be counted. Another use is on a resolution honoring or in memory of a notable person, when the assembly stands in honor or remembrance.

=== Show of hands ===
A show of hands is a method of public voting, often used in small boards, committees or also informal gatherings, or some larger assemblies. Members raise their hands to indicate support for the motion, then for opposition to it. The chairperson assesses which side had the most hands, sometimes by counting them individually. This method is more precise than a voice vote and ensures that each member's vote is counted equally (no advantage for shouting louder). However, it is not a full division of the assembly, and can produce a larger number of abstentions than a rising vote.

In some national legislatures and public organizations, members instead use their credentials or membership cards.

== Recorded vote ==
A recorded vote is a vote in which the votes (for or against) of each member of the assembly are recorded (and often later published). RONR explains:

Taking a vote by roll call (or by yeas and nays, as it is also called) has the effect of placing on the record how each member, or sometimes each delegation, votes; therefore, it has exactly the opposite effect of a ballot vote. It is usually confined to representative bodies, where the proceeds are published, since it enables constituents to know how their representatives voted on certain measures. It should not be used in a mass meeting or in any assembly whose members are not responsible to a constituency.

Recorded votes may either be taken by actually calling the roll (a task typically ordered by the chair and performed by the secretary) or, in some assemblies, by electronic device.

=== Signed ballot ===
A signed ballot is sometimes used as a substitute for a roll call vote. It allows the members' votes to be recorded in the minutes without the chair having to call the names of each member individually. A motion to use a signed ballot is one of the motions relating to methods of voting and the polls.

== Balloting ==
=== Repeated balloting ===
Repeated balloting or the majority rule is the standard election method for most parliamentary elections. In it, a candidate is elected if they receive support from a majority of the voters. At no point are any candidates involuntarily eliminated, as they would under instant-runoff voting or the exhaustive ballot. Mason's Manual states, "In the absence of a special rule, a majority vote is necessary to elect officers and a plurality is not sufficient. A vote for the election of officers, when no candidate receives a majority vote, is of no effect, and the situation remains exactly as though no vote had been taken." Demeter's Manual states, "The fact that a majority (or a plurality) of the votes are cast for an ineligible candidate does not entitle the candidate receiving the next highest number of votes to be declared elected. In such a case, the voters have failed to make a choice, and they proceed to vote again."

Repeated balloting allows a dark horse or compromise candidate, who received few votes in the first round, to become the candidate that opposing factions agree to settle on. Moreover, it can prevent a candidate who is opposed by the majority of the electorate from being elected, as might happen under plurality.

A disadvantage is that if no one drops out of the race, and the voters are unwilling to switch sides, balloting can theoretically go on forever. In the U.S. presidential election of 1800, Thomas Jefferson and Aaron Burr were tied at 73 electoral votes each, and in accordance with the Constitution the election was determined via a contingent election in the House of Representatives, where it took six days of debate and 36 ballots to elect Jefferson as the winner.

Between rounds of balloting, members can make motions to help the assembly complete the election within a reasonable time. For instance, the assembly may vote to drop the candidate having the lowest vote after each successive vote, or reopen nominations for the office in order to secure a candidate on whom the majority can agree. This can help break a deadlock. In the 1855-56 election for Speaker of the House, the chamber, which had been deadlocked for 129 ballots, adopted a plurality rule stating that, if after three more ballots no one garnered a majority of the votes, the person receiving the highest number of votes on the next ensuing ballot would be declared speaker. On the decisive 133rd ballot, Nathaniel P. Banks received the most votes, 103 votes out of 214, or five less than a majority, and was elected speaker.

=== Nonstandard rules ===
==== Runoff and elimination rules ====
Preferential voting allows members to vote on more than one proposal or candidate at a time, and to rank the various options in order of preference.

Robert's Rules of Order recommends using ranked voting when it is not possible to use repeated ballots, but prefers repeated ballots over instant-runoff voting where possible because the latter "affords less freedom of choice than repeated balloting, because it denies voters the opportunity of basing their second or lesser choices on the results of earlier ballots, and because the candidate or proposition in last place is automatically eliminated and may thus be prevented from becoming a compromise choice". In any case, preferential voting can be used only if the bylaws specifically authorize it. It is worth noting that elimination of the candidate with fewest votes is a feature of instant-runoff voting, but not of most modern ranked voting methods (which, by the median voter theorem, will tend to elect compromise candidates in a single round of voting).

RONR advises against any such voting rule, saying that "The nominee receiving the lowest number of votes is never removed from the ballot unless the bylaws so require, or unless he withdraws – which, in the absence of such a bylaw, he is not obligated to do. The nominee in lowest place may turn out to be a 'dark horse' on whom all factions may prefer to agree". In social choice, this procedure by which elimination rules tend to eliminate consensus candidates is called the center squeeze effect.

==== Multiwinner voting ====
RONR discusses cumulative voting, a procedure that allows electors to divide a single vote between multiple candidates into k parts; the case where k=1 is called single non-transferable vote. RONR notes that "A minority group, by coordinating its effort in voting for only one candidate who is a member of the group, may be able to secure the election of that candidate as a minority member of the board". Similar, but more proportional, rules include Thiele's method or Phragmen's rules.

== Motions relating to methods of voting and the polls ==
Motions relating to methods of voting and the polls (RONR)
- Class: Incidental
- In order when another has the floor?: No
- Requires second?: Yes
- Debatable?: No
- May be reconsidered?: To close polls, no; to reopen polls, negative vote only; all others, yes
- Amendable?: Yes
- Vote required: Majority, except two-thirds for motion to close polls

Motions relating to methods of voting and the polls are incidental motions used to obtain a vote on a question in some form other than by voice or by division of the assembly; or to close or reopen the polls. For instance, a motion can be made to vote by ballot.

These motions generally cannot be used to specify alternative forms of voting such as cumulative voting or preferential voting. Those methods can only be done through a provision in the bylaws. Likewise, proxy voting is generally prohibited, except in situations in which membership is transferable, as in stock corporations and even then, only by authorization in the bylaws.

== Voting systems in legislatures ==
Many legislative bodies use electronic voting systems for recorded votes.

=== Ancient Rome ===
In the various types of legislative assemblies (comitia) of the Roman Republic, the voting was preceded by a contio (public meeting at which issues or candidates were presented). After the presiding magistrate called an end to this, citizens were dispersed into roped-off areas and were called forth in groups across raised gangways. Initially, each voter gave his vote orally to an official who made a note of it on an official tablet, but later in the Republic, the secret ballot was introduced, and the voter recorded his vote with a stylus on a wax-covered boxwood tablet, then dropped the completed ballot in the sitella or urna (voting urn), sometimes also called cista.

=== United States ===
==== United States House of Representatives ====
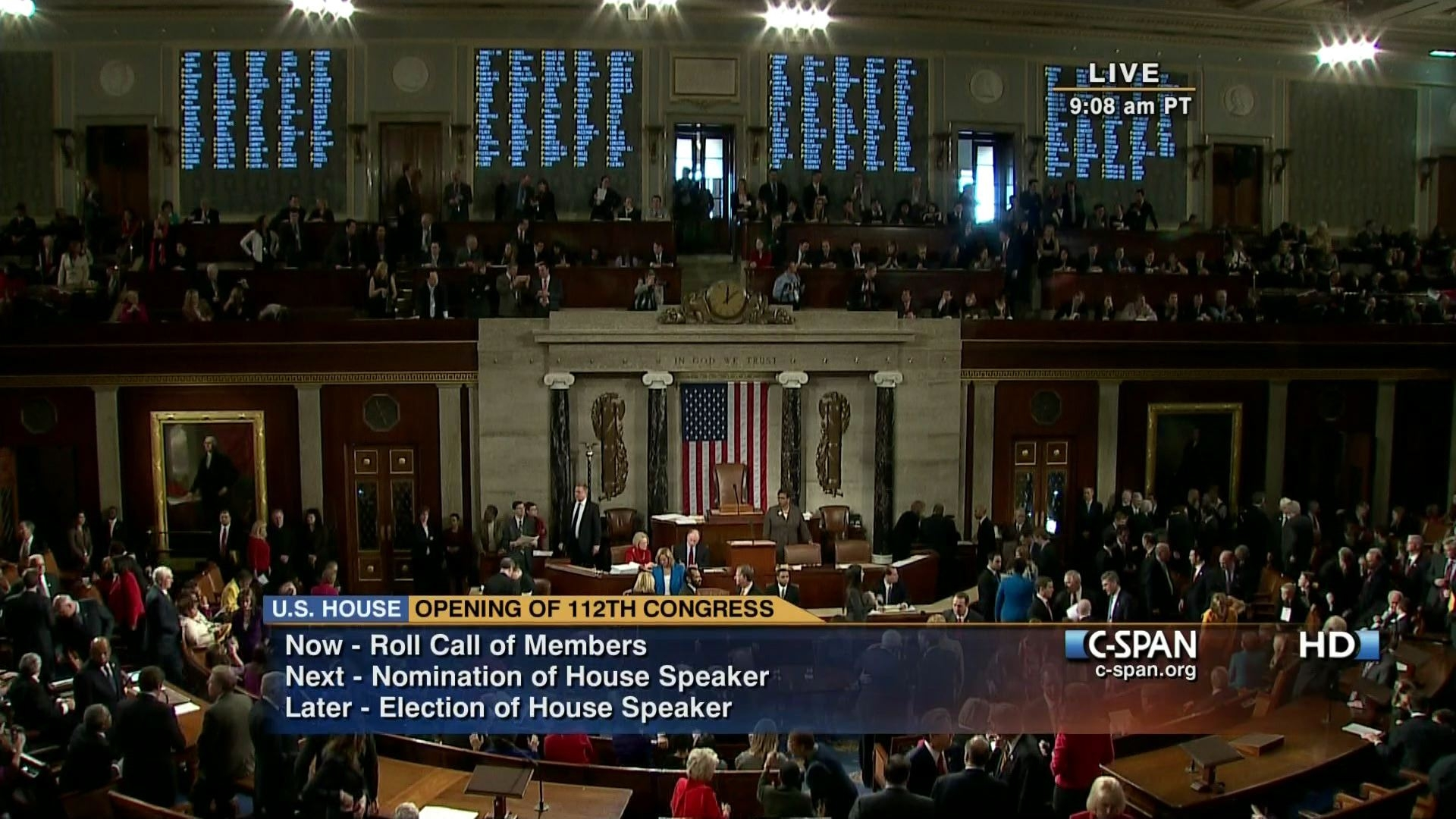
The U.S. House of Representatives taking a roll-call vote to elect its speaker for the 112th Congress, as broadcast by C-SPAN.

In 1869, Thomas Edison filed for a patent on the first electric vote recorder, and demonstrated the system to the United States Congress. The first proposal for automated voting in Congress was made in 1886. Over the next 84 years, fifty bills and resolutions to establish an automatic, electrical, mechanical, or electronic voting system in Congress were introduced. The Legislative Reorganization Act of 1970 authorized electronic voting for the first time. Electronic voting was first used in the House on January 23, 1973, to record a quorum call.

Under the system implemented in the 1970s, members of the House may vote at any one of a number of stations located throughout the chamber. Each member has a small plastic card, punched identically on either end. To cast a vote, the representative inserts the card into the station in any direction and presses one of three buttons: "Yea," "Nay," or "Present."

The representative's vote is then displayed in two summary panels above the press gallery seats and to the right and left of the speaker's dais. The panel shows the member's name and a light corresponding to how that member voted (green for yea, red for nay, and amber for present), keeps a running count of vote casts, and displays time remaining for a vote (most votes are held open for at least fifteen minutes). The system as used today is much the same as that used in the 1970s, although today, member's voting cards are magnetic stripe cards that contain identification information. Once a representative has voted, he or she may check the vote by reinserting the card and seeing which light is illuminated at the voting station. For the first ten minutes of a vote, a representative may also change their vote by reinserting the card to change the vote. If a representative wants to change their vote in the last five minutes of a fifteen-minute vote, the representative must use a teller card in the well of the House. A tally clerk then manually enters the vote into the electronic voting system.

In 1977, the electronic voting system was updated to be compatible with the House's newly installed closed-circuit television system showing the House chamber. The updates enabled in-progress voting counts to be displayed on the closed-circuit TV system. In-progress vote counts are now also shown on C-SPAN.

==== United States Senate ====
The three means of voting in the Senate are voice, division, and "the yeas and nays" (recorded votes or roll-call votes).

On a voice vote, the presiding officer first asks those in favor to say "aye", and then opposed to say "no". The presiding officer then announces who appeared to win the vote ("The ayes [noes] appear to have it."). One variation of a voice vote is for the presiding officer to state: "Without objection the amendment [bill, resolution, motion, etc.] is agreed to [or not agreed to]." If any senator objects to the presiding officer's determination, a vote will occur by another method (usually a recorded vote).

A division vote (taken by having each side stand) is rare in the Senate, but may be requested by any senator or ordered by the presiding officer if the outcome of the voice vote is doubtful. Like the voice vote, a division does not provide a record of how each senator voted. The chair announces the result of a division vote. As in a voice vote, any senator may ask for a recorded vote.

The third method is a recorded vote ("the yeas and nays"), currently taken by a roll call. The clerk calls the roll of senators alphabetical by name, and each Senator individually responds. Following the call, the clerk then identifies those who voted in the affirmative and those in the negative. The time limit for roll-call votes is nominally fifteen minutes as set by unanimous consent at the start of a two-year Congress, but votes are sometimes held open for longer so that senators may arrive.

Unlike the House, the Senate does not use electronic voting. In December 2013, Senate Majority Leader Harry Reid suggested that he would not be opposed to setting up an electronic system similar to that used in the House, but also stated that he didn't see any change occurring "in the near future". Use of an electronic system would make it possible for the Senate to vote more quickly during "vote-a-rama" sessions on amendments to budget resolutions.

S. Res. 480, a Senate resolution passed in 1984, created a standing order of the Senate requiring that each senator vote from their assigned desk. The resolution was sponsored by Democratic Senator Jennings Randolph of West Virginia. However, the rule is widely ignored, and senators typically vote while milling about the Senate chamber. All senators do vote from their desks, however, when asked to do so by the Senate majority leader. This typically is done on particularly solemn or important votes. The Senate Historical Office maintains a list of occasions when senators voted from their desks: these occasions included the passages of both the Affordable Care Act and Health Care and Education Reconciliation Act, the confirmation votes of Supreme Court justices, and votes on articles of impeachment.

==== State legislatures ====
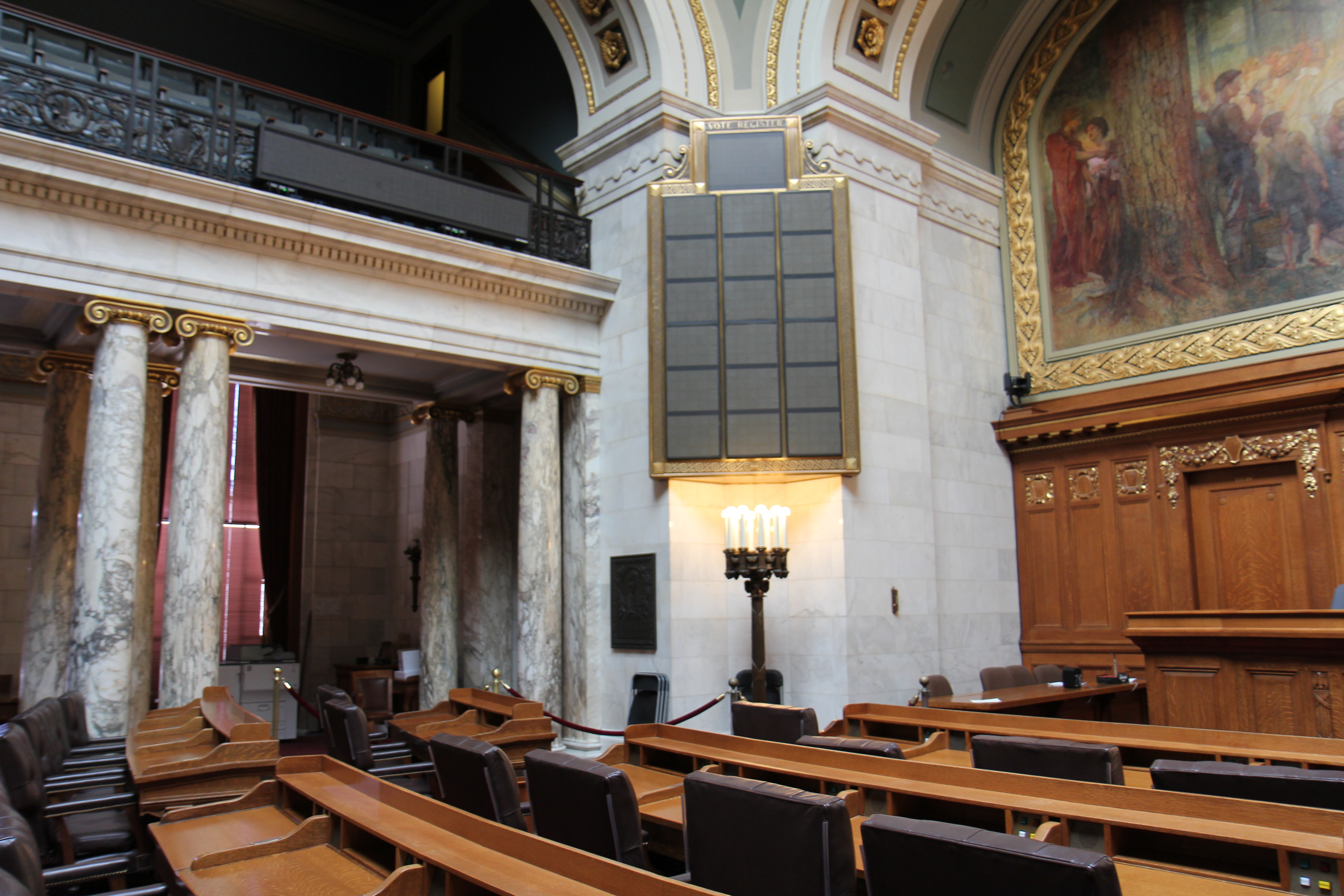
The Wisconsin State Assembly chamber, with the electronic vote board on the wall. In 1917, the Wisconsin State Assembly became the first state legislative chamber to adopt an electronic voting system.

Many state legislatures use electronic voting systems for recorded votes. The first state legislative chambers to install electronic voting systems were the Wisconsin State Assembly (1917), Texas House of Representatives (1919), and Virginia House of Delegates (1923). Electronic voting systems continued to spread, and by 1980, nearly half of legislatures used such a system.

Today, almost two-thirds of the legislative bodies have installed electronic voting systems. About 40 percent of chambers have made updates to their system since 1990.

Electronic voting systems typically have voting controls at the front desk and running vote total displays. The National Conference of State Legislatures has reported on various differences in state electronic voting-systems:

- In more than half of chambers, the clerk or secretary opens and closes the roll-call system. In seventeen chambers, the presiding officer opens and closes the system; in five chambers, the reading clerk opens and closes the system, and in nine chambers, some other legislative staffer opens and closes the system.
- In 36 chambers, electronic roll-call votes are not subject to change. In one-third of chambers, however, changes are allowed if requested at the time of the vote. Seventeen chambers allow a roll-call vote to be changed upon a member's request at a later time.
- In 42 chambers, a running vote total is displayed to the chamber; running vote totals appear on the presiding officer's monitor in 62 chambers and on the clerk's monitor in 59.

More sophisticated electronic voting systems are sometimes linked to other technology to assist the legislatures in their work:

- In 48 chambers, the voting system is linked to journal production.
- In 40 chambers, the voting system is linked with the calendar.
- In 24 chambers, the system has a debate timer.
- In ten chambers, the presiding officer has a monitor displaying which legislators wish to speak and the order of the requests.

A minority of state legislative chambers do not use an electronic voting system. Fourteen chambers use a traditional manual roll-call system in which the clerk calls the roll orally, records each member's vote on paper, and then tallies the ayes and nays. Twelve chambers use a hybrid system in which the clerk orally calls the roll, but each member's vote is then entered into a system.

=== United Kingdom ===
==== Parliament of the United Kingdom ====
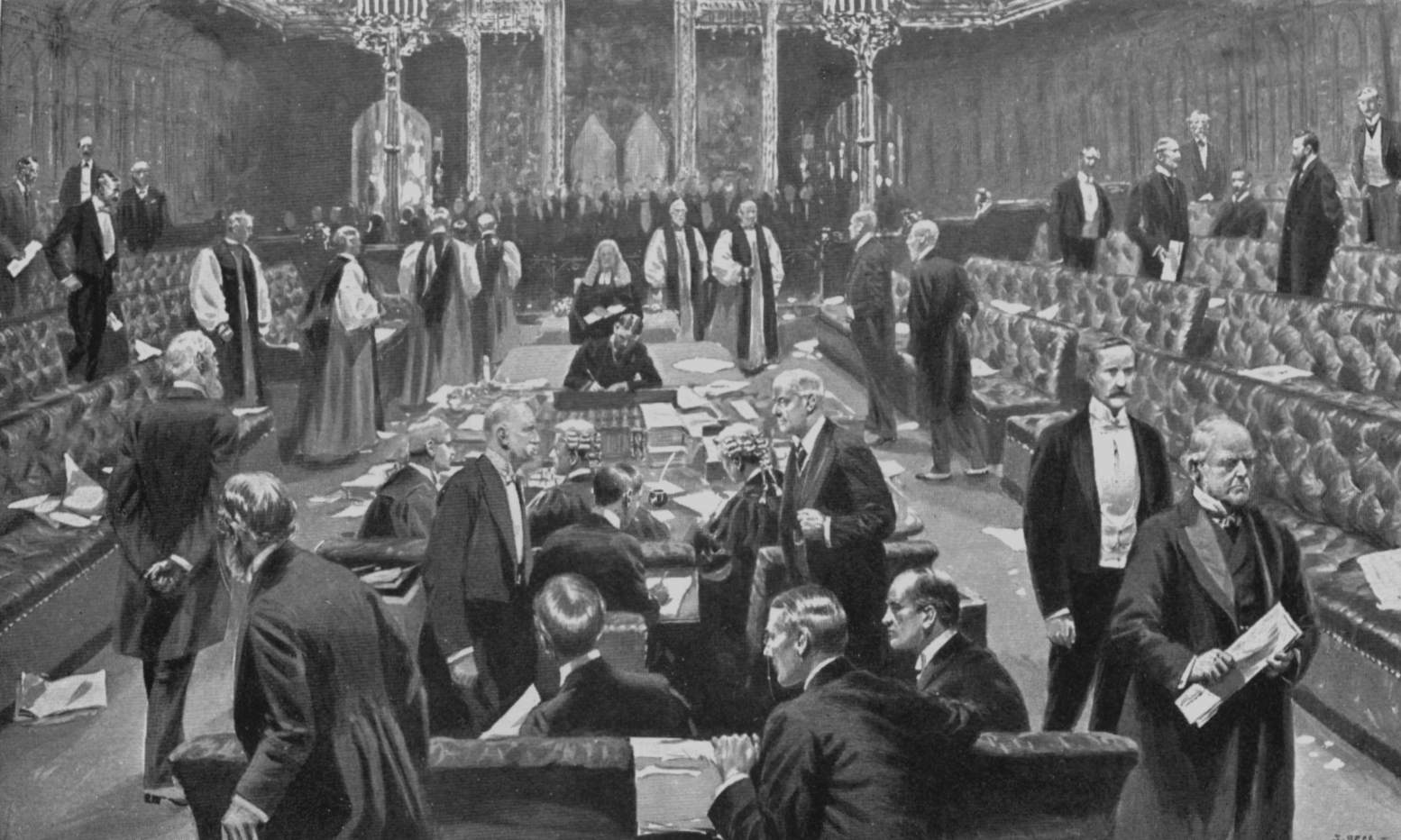
The House of Lords votes on the Parliament Act 1911

In the Parliament of the United Kingdom (Westminster), at the close of debate, the presiding officer of the chamber—the Speaker of the House of Commons or the Lord Speaker of the House of Lords—"puts the motion" by asking members to call out their votes, typically saying "As many as are of that opinion, say 'aye'". The supporters of the measure shout "aye". The Speaker then says, "Of the contrary, 'no'" and the opponents of the measure shout "no". The Speaker then makes a determination of which side has won ("I think the Ayes [or Noes] have it.").

If the result of the vote is unclear (or challenged by any member of the house), the Speaker will call for a division of the house. Once a division has been called, the order "Clear the Lobby" is given in the Commons, and division bells ring out throughout the Parliamentary Estate to alert members that a vote is to take place. Members then physically separate themselves into the division lobbies, the Aye lobby to the Speaker's right and the No lobby to the Speaker's left. As members pass through the lobbies, clerks record their names and they are counted by tellers. Members have eight minutes to vote before the doors to the division lobbies are locked. In the Commons, the tally is complete, the tellers approach the presiding officer and announce the tally, and then the Speaker or Lord Speaker announces the result.

Some votes are "deferred" and instead conducted by means of an open ballot done at a convenient time for members. This is typically done for minor or technical legislation and is not permitted to be done for Bills.

The House of Lords follows are similar procedure, though the words "aye" and "no" are replaced by "content" and "not content" and the order given before a division is "Clear the Bar". Since the COVID-19 pandemic, the Lords now vote electronically but members must be physically present in Parliament in order to do so, unless special dispensation is obtained.

Before 2020, proposals to adopt electronic voting in Parliament were considered but rejected. For a temporary period between 22 April and 20 May 2020 due to COVID-19, Parliament sat virtually and both houses conducted electronic voting known as "virtual divisions". Although this no longer applies in the House of Commons, the count in that house is now counted and verified by electronic means of members scanning their passes as they enter a division lobby.

==== Devolved assemblies ====
Among the devolved assemblies, the Northern Ireland Assembly uses the Westminster mode of voting; members use "Aye" and "No" lobbies unless a unanimous voice vote is taken. By contrast, the Scottish Parliament (Holyrood), Senedd and States of Jersey use electronic voting systems.

=== European Parliament ===
In the European Parliament, decisions are usually made by show of hands. If the show of hands leads to a doubtful result, the vote is taken by standing and sitting. If this, too, leads to a doubtful result, the vote is taken by roll call. (A roll-call vote is also taken if any political group or any 21 members request). The president of the European Parliament may also decide to hold a vote using the Parliament's electronic voting system. Electronic voting systems are installed in each of the European Parliament's two locations: Strasbourg and Brussels.

If at least 20% of the Parliament requests it before voting begins, the vote will be taken by secret ballot.

=== Russian State Duma ===
In the Russian State Duma, relatively few roll call votes have been published that identify individual deputies' votes. The votes of individuals are recorded only if the voting is open and the electronic method is used. While not all votes are officially roll call votes, every time a deputy electronically votes a computer registers the individual deputy's vote.

== See also ==
- Keypad polling
- Voting system (disambiguation)
