= Recess (motion) =

Short intermission in a meeting of a deliberative assembly

Motion to recess
- Class: Privileged motion
- In order when another has the floor?: No
- Requires second?: Yes
- Debatable?: No
- May be reconsidered?: No
- Amendable?: Yes
- Vote required: Majority

In parliamentary procedure, a recess refers to a short intermission in a meeting of a deliberative assembly. The members may leave the meeting room, but are expected to remain nearby. A recess may be simply to allow a break (e.g. for lunch) or it may be related to the meeting (e.g. to allow time for vote-counting).

Sometimes the line between a recess and an adjournment can be fine. A break for lunch can be more in the nature of a recess or an adjournment depending on the time and the extent of dispersion of the members required for them to be served. But at the resumption of business after a recess, there are never any "opening" proceedings such as reading of minutes; business picks up right where it left off. The distinction of whether the assembly recesses or adjourns has implications related to the admissibility of a motion to reconsider and enter on the minutes and the renewability of the motion to suspend the rules.

Under Robert's Rules of Order Newly Revised, a motion to recess may not be called when another person has the floor, is not reconsiderable, and requires a second and a majority vote. When adopted, it has immediate effect.

If made when business is pending, it is an undebatable, privileged motion. It can be modified only by amendment of the length of the break.

== Stand at ease ==
Stand at ease is a brief pause without a recess in which the members remain in place but may converse while waiting for the meeting to resume.

== Use by legislatures ==
=== Brazil ===
In the National Congress of Brazil, a recess is a break in congressional activities. During every year-long session, the congress has two scheduled recess periods: a mid-winter break between 17 July and 1 August, and a summer break between 22 December and 2 February of the following year.

=== United States Congress ===
In the United States Congress, a recess could mean a temporary interruption or it could mean a longer break, such as one for the holidays or for the summer.
