= Requests and inquiries =

Parliamentary motions to obtain information

In parliamentary procedure, requests and inquiries are motions used by members of a deliberative assembly to obtain information or to do or have something done that requires permission of the assembly. Except for a request to be excused from a duty, these requests and inquiries are not debatable nor amendable.

== Explanation and use ==
At a meeting, members may want to obtain information or request to do something that requires permission from the assembly. These requests and inquiries are in order when another has the floor if they require immediate attention. The requests and inquiries include a parliamentary inquiry, request for information, request for permission to withdraw or modify a motion, request to read papers, and request for any other privilege. Also, a member could request to be excused from a duty.

== Parliamentary inquiry ==
Parliamentary inquiry (RONR)
- Class: Incidental motion
- In order when another has the floor?: Yes
- Requires second?: No
- Debatable?: No
- May be reconsidered?: No
- Amendable?: No
- Vote required: Is not voted on, but is responded to by chair

When a member is unsure about the rules or procedures applying to a certain situation in a meeting, the member can ask the chairperson a parliamentary inquiry. The primary purpose is to enable members to obtain the chair's guidance so they can take the appropriate action.

A parliamentary inquiry is sometimes used as a tactful alternative to a call for the orders of the day, or a point of order.

Mason's Manual of Legislative Procedure states, "It is not, however, the presiding officer's duty to answer general questions concerning parliamentary law." The chair is also not obligated to answer hypothetical questions. This motion is made by saying, "Ms. Chairperson, I rise to a parliamentary inquiry."

== Request for information ==
Request for information (RONR)
- Class: Incidental motion
- In order when another has the floor?: Yes
- Requires second?: No
- Debatable?: No
- May be reconsidered?: No
- Amendable?: No
- Vote required: Is not voted on

In parliamentary procedure, a request for information is a request directed to the chair, or through the chair to another person, for information relevant to the business at hand. Prior to the 11th edition of Robert's Rules of Order Newly Revised, this device was known as "point of information." The change was made to avoid the common misconception that this motion was to provide information instead of correctly being a request.

The information sought in the request generally pertains to the substantive matter under discussion, and therefore the request is distinct from a parliamentary inquiry, which requests information related to parliamentary procedure. If another member responds to the question, then any time he spends doing so is taken out of his allowed time. Accordingly, if a request for information is used to interrupt someone's speech to ask them a question, the chair asks the member if he is willing to be interrupted. A request for information can be used to remind a member of a point to be made in argument or with the intention of rebutting his position, but it must always be put in the form of a question.

Mason's Manual of Legislative Procedure states, "If members desire to ask a question of other members, they may do so through the presiding officer, but it is discourteous and a strict violation of parliamentary rules to ask questions directly of a member...If the first reply does not fully answer the question, it is the practice to permit a limited number of further questions to be asked." Further restrictions are that questions addressed to members may be related only to a question before the body; that a question reflecting upon the character or conduct of any member or upon the executive or another official, or inquiring as to what course a member proposes to follow, is not permitted; and that purpose of the question must be to obtain information and not to supply it to the body. Accordingly, a question may not contain statements of fact unless they are necessary to make the question intelligible, and can be authenticated. Nor may a question contain arguments. A question, then, is distinct from debate. A member is entitled to inquire concerning the meaning or purpose or effect of an undebatable motion.

== Request for permission to withdraw or modify a motion ==
Request for permission to withdraw or modify a motion (RONR)
- Class: Incidental motion
- In order when another has the floor?: If not granted by unanimous consent, can be moved by person requesting permission, or by another while the former has the floor
- Requires second?: Yes, if motion is made by person requesting permission; no, if made by another member
- Debatable?: No
- May be reconsidered?: As to withdrawal, negative vote only; as to modification, yes
- Amendable?: No
- Vote required: Majority

In a deliberative assembly, the motion to request for permission to withdraw or modify a motion is made if the maker of the motion wishes to withdraw or change it after it has been stated by the chair.

Using Robert's Rules of Order Newly Revised (RONR), before a motion has been stated by the chair, permission is unnecessary for the maker of the motion to withdraw it or modify it. After a motion is placed before the assembly, permission from the assembly is required to withdraw it or modify it.

Sometimes a "friendly amendment" is requested on a pending motion. If the motion is before the assembly, only the assembly (not the maker of the motion) could modify it. However, it can be settled by unanimous consent.

If a main motion is withdrawn, all adhering motions (such as amendments) are no longer before the body as well.

== Request to read papers ==
Request to read papers (RONR)
- Class: Incidental motion
- In order when another has the floor?: If not granted by unanimous consent, can be moved by person requesting permission or by another while the former has the floor
- Requires second?: Yes, if motion is made by person requesting permission; no, if made by another member
- Debatable?: No
- May be reconsidered?: Yes
- Amendable?: No
- Vote required: Majority

The motion to request to read papers is used to allow a member of a deliberative assembly to read from a paper, book, manuscript, newspaper, or other document as part of his speech.

Normally, this motion is handled as a matter of unanimous consent. The reason for requiring this motion to be made is to prevent such readings from being done as a dilatory tactic.

Under Demeter's Manual of Parliamentary Law and Procedure, a member can read from such documents, but must stop if an objection is made, seconded, and adopted by majority vote. Referring to one's notes does not constitute reading, and the reading of written or printed reports of officers or committees from paper, yearbook, etc. is not subject to such objection.

Mason's Manual of Legislative Procedure states:

A member has no right to read, or have the clerk read, from any paper or book, or to use any electronic recording as a part of a speech, without the permission of the body. However, this rule is never rigorously enforced except where there is an intentional or gross abuse of the time and patience of the body. It is customary, however, to allow members to read printed extracts as part of their speeches, as long as they do not abuse the privilege. Members do not have the right to read their own written speeches, without permission of the body. This also is to prevent the abuse of time, and therefore should not be refused except where the privilege is abused. Members are entitled to speak from notes.

== Request for any other privilege ==
Request for any other privilege (RONR)
- Class: Incidental motion
- In order when another has the floor?: Yes
- Debatable?: No
- May be reconsidered?: Yes
- Amendable?: No
- Vote required: Majority vote, although usually handled by unanimous consent

In a deliberative assembly, a request for any other privilege is used when one wishes to, for instance, make a presentation when no motion is pending.

Generally, these requests are handled by unanimous consent. Otherwise, a majority vote would grant the request.

Demeter's Manual of Parliamentary Law and Procedure states that requests for any unallowable purpose need unanimous consent, and a single objection defeats consent, unless the organization's laws or the assembly's usual practices allow otherwise. An example might be a request to have a nonmember address the body. In addition, Demeter states:

To prevent delays which can arise out of such requests, but yet to give ear to meritorious ones, sagacious and alert members can rise and say: "Mr. Chairman, reserving the right to object, for what purpose does he want the floor," or "What will Mr. X discuss?" He is thus qualified to object if the purpose is not meritorious.

== Request to be excused from a duty ==
Request to be excused from a duty (RONR)
- Class: Incidental motion
- In order when another has the floor?: Yes
- Requires second?: Yes, if motion is made by member to be excused, no, if made by another member
- Debatable?: Yes
- May be reconsidered?: Negative vote only
- Amendable?: Yes
- Vote required: Majority

A request to be excused from a duty is used when a member of a deliberative assembly wishes to be excused from attending a certain number of meetings, preparing talks or papers, serving on committees, or any other duties that may be imposed on the member. It could also be called a resignation and could be from an officer position or even from the organization itself.

A non-compulsory duty can be declined at the time the member is named to it (or first learns of it) but if the member remains silent, that member is regarded as accepting it. At that point, if the member is unable or unwilling to discharge the duty, that person generally submits a resignation in writing to the secretary or appointing power, and the chair assumes a motion that the resignation be accepted. Unlike the other requests and inquiries, this motion is debatable and amendable. The member should not abandon the duties until the resignation has been accepted or there has been a reasonable opportunity for it to be accepted.

Sometimes a member wants to withdraw the resignation. This could be done at any time before the resignation is placed before the accepting body. After it is placed before the assembly, it can only be withdrawn by the consent of that body.

A majority vote is required to accept the request, although it is usually accepted by unanimous consent.
