= Previous question =

Motion in US parliamentary procedure

In US parliamentary procedure, the previous question (also known as "calling for the question", "calling the question", "close debate", "calling for a vote", "vote now", or other similar forms) is generally used as a motion to end debate on a pending proposal and bring it to an immediate vote. The meaning of this specialized motion has nothing to do with any question previously considered by the assembly.

In the United States Senate and Commonwealth parliaments, a motion for "cloture", or "closure", is used instead to end debate. In those bodies, the "previous question" has a different use and is rarely used or not used at all.

== History ==
=== English Parliament ===
The first instance of the "previous question" being used in the English Parliament dates back to 25 May 1604. At that time, use of this motion was intended not to end debate, but to suppress the main question for the rest of the sitting (similar to an objection to the consideration of a question). It could be debated and when put to a vote, an affirmative vote on the previous question would put the main motion to an immediate vote, while a negative vote on the previous question would end consideration of the main motion altogether for the day.

=== United States Congress ===
==== House of Representatives ====
In the United States House of Representatives, the previous question originally served the same purpose as it did in the English Parliament. In the 1800s, the House of Representatives altered the rules governing the way the previous question could be used: in 1805, it was deemed non-debatable, and in 1841, the fraction of votes needed to pass it was lowered from 2/3 to 1/2, allowing for it to be invoked by a simple majority. These changes made it effectively equivalent of a motion of closure.

==== Senate ====
In 1806, the United States Senate eliminated the previous question motion as part of a rules consolidation suggested by Aaron Burr.

== Explanation and use ==
To end debate, a motion for the previous question could be adopted. It is often proposed by a member saying, "I call [for] the question", although the formal wording is, "I move the previous question." The motion for the "previous question" has nothing to do with the last question previously considered by the assembly.

Another use of this motion could be to stop the moving of amendments on any amendable motion. It also prevents the making of other subsidiary motions like commit or postpone.

Previous question (RONR)
- Class: Subsidiary motion
- In order when another has the floor?: No
- Requires second?: Yes
- Debatable?: No
- May be reconsidered?: Yes, but if vote was affirmative, only before any vote has been taken under it. A negative vote on this motion can be reconsidered only until such time as progress in business or debate has made it essentially a new question.
- Amendable?: No
- Vote required: Two-thirds

=== Robert's Rules of Order Newly Revised (RONR) ===
Under Robert's Rules of Order Newly Revised (the book used by most organizations in the United States), when a motion for the previous question is made (whether formally or in a nonstandard form such as "calling the question", "close debate", or "calling for a vote"), a two-thirds vote (or unanimous consent) is required to end debate. A single member cannot force the end of debate. Also, interrupting someone by yelling out "Question!" or "Call the question!" is not appropriate (it has to be made by obtaining the floor like other motions).

This motion is not debatable because having debate on such a motion would defeat its purpose.

In ordinary societies, the rationale for a two-thirds vote to end debate and move to a vote on the pending question is to protect the rights of the minority.

=== Mason's Manual of Legislative Procedure ===
Most state legislatures in the United States use Mason's Manual of Legislative Procedure. This book also provides for the motion of the previous question.

== The Standard Code of Parliamentary Procedure ==
The Standard Code of Parliamentary Procedure does not have the "previous question". Instead this book has the motion to "close debate", the motion to "vote immediately", or the motion to "close debate and vote immediately". Regardless of the terminology, a two-thirds vote is required to end debate.

== Use in the United States Congress ==
In the United States House of Representatives, the previous question may be used to end debate on the proposal under consideration at the time the motion is made. If any Member moves the previous question, the Speaker must immediately put the question on such motion. If a simple majority of Members present and voting votes in favour of the previous question, the main motion is immediately put up to a vote.

Instead of a motion for the previous question, the United States Senate uses a motion to limit debate, called cloture. This requires three-fifths of the total number of Senators. It does not immediately end debate on the pending question, but rather imposes strict limitations on debate.

== Use in other legislative bodies ==
In the House of Commons of the United Kingdom, in the Senate of Australia and in the Parliament of Canada, the previous question is used for its original purpose (that is, to postpone consideration of the question), while motions which have the aim of immediately ending debate are called closure motions.

=== United Kingdom ===
In the House of Commons, the previous question takes the form of a motion "that the Question be not now put"; its adoption results in debate on the main motion being postponed, while its rejection results in the main motion being immediately put up to a vote. A motion "that the question be not now put" is debatable and may be itself subject to a motion of closure. The Select Committee on the Modernisation of the House of Commons criticized this procedure as "totally incomprehensible", and proposed in its place a simplified motion to "proceed to the next business".

== See also ==
- Debate (parliamentary procedure)
- Table (parliamentary procedure) – a term that also has different meanings in British and American use
