= Nomination =

Selecting a candidate for public office or to receive an honor/award

Nomination is part of the process of selecting a candidate for either election to a public office, or the bestowing of an honor or award. A collection of nominees narrowed from the full list of candidates is a short list.

== Political office ==
In the context of elections for public office, a candidate who has been selected to represent or is endorsed by a political party is said to be the party's nominee. The process of selection may be based on one or more primary elections or by means of a political party convention or caucus, according to the rules of the party and any applicable election laws. In some countries the process is called preselection.

Public statements of support for a candidate's nomination are known as endorsements or testimonials.

In some jurisdictions the nominee of a recognized political party is entitled to appear on the general election ballot paper. Candidates who are endorsed by a political party may be required to submit a nominating petition in order to gain ballot access. In others all candidates have to meet nomination rules criteria to stand.

== Parliamentary procedure ==
In parliamentary procedure, a nomination is basically a motion to fill a blank in a motion "that _____ be elected." Nominations are used to provide choices of candidates for election to office. After nominations have been made, the assembly proceeds to its method of voting used for electing officers.

=== Motions relating to nominations ===
Motions relating to nominations
- Class: Incidental motion
- In order when another has the floor?: No
- Requires second?: Yes
- Debatable?: No
- May be reconsidered?: Yes, except motion to close nominations or affirmative vote on motion to reopen nominations
- Amendable?: Yes
- Vote required: Majority vote, except motion to close nominations requires a two-thirds vote

There are a number of motions relating to nominations. They include the motions to make, close, and reopen nominations, and motions to designate the method of making nominations. The motion to select a method of nominating is also treated as filling a blank, in which votes are taken on suggested methods of nomination in the following order:

- by the chair
- from the floor (open nominations)
- by a committee
- by ballot
- by mail
- by petition

Not all of these methods may be suitable for a particular organization.

=== Legitimate use of closing nominations ===
Normally, nominations are closed when no one else wants to make a nomination. This is done without a motion (using a form of unanimous consent). A motion to close nominations cannot be used to prevent a member from making a nomination. A legitimate use of a motion to close nominations is that some members are obviously delaying the election by nominating persons who have no chance of being elected. It takes a two-thirds vote to close nominations, but only a majority vote to reopen them.

== Awards and honours ==
The rules of a number of awards or honours require the nomination of candidates. The rules for who and how candidates are nominated vary with each award or honour, as do the processes of selecting from the candidates.

For some awards and honours, being nominated or shortlisted is itself considered an honour, as in the case of the Academy Awards and other similar events, and with events such as book and arts awards. In 2015 there were 273 candidates nominated for the Nobel Peace Prize, while 9000 are nominated for the more satirical Ig Nobel Prizes every year.
