= Postpone to a certain time =

In parliamentary procedure in the United States, a motion to postpone to a certain time (or postpone definitely or postpone) is used to delay action on a pending question until a different day, meeting, hour or until after a certain event. Then, when that time comes, the consideration of the question is picked up where it was left off when it was postponed.

== Explanation and use ==
Postpone to a certain time (RONR)
- Class: Subsidiary motion
- In order when another has the floor?: No
- Requires second?: Yes
- Debatable?: Yes
- May be reconsidered?: Yes
- Amendable?: Yes
- Vote required: Majority, unless it makes the question a special order, in which case a two-thirds vote is required

Using Robert's Rules of Order Newly Revised (RONR), action on a pending question may be postponed to another time. Alternatively, a motion can be postponed until after a specific event has occurred, such as after an officer makes a relevant report. A postponed question becomes an order of the day (a general order or a special order in the order of business) for the time to which it is postponed. Postponing a motion is permitted so long as:

- There is a meeting on the date the motion is postponed to. For example, a main motion cannot be postponed to a day where there is no regular meeting or where a special meeting has not been planned yet.
- The date to which the main motion is being postponed is not too late for it to be effective. For example, if the main motion proposes that there be a picnic on September 3, the motion cannot be postponed to September 5, because that would be too late for it to be carried out.

Under Demeter's Manual, if a motion to postpone definitely specifies a time that falls after the next regular meeting, or after a certain event which will not occur until after the next regular meeting, then it is treated as a motion to postpone indefinitely, which effectively ends consideration of the pending question.

A motion to postpone an action or event that was previously scheduled is distinct from the subsidiary motion to postpone to a certain time, and is a type of the motion to amend something previously adopted.

Generally, a motion to postpone is applied to a main motion and not to other motions alone.

Debate on the motion to postpone to a certain time should be brief and confined only to the reasons for and time of the postponement. Amendments to it may only relate to the desired date that the assembly will resume consideration or if the question is to be a special order.

The Standard Code of Parliamentary Procedure (TSC) treats the motion to postpone to a certain time similar to that in RONR. A difference is that TSC does not allow this motion to be reconsidered.

== Improper use of tabling a motion ==
Frequently, a motion is improperly "tabled" until the next meeting. In this case, the proper procedure would have been to postpone the motion to the next meeting.
