= Committee of the whole =

Legislative assembly acting as a committee

A committee of the whole is a meeting of a legislative or deliberative assembly using procedural rules that are based on those of a committee, except that in this case the committee includes all members of the assembly. As with other (standing) committees, the activities of a committee of the whole are limited to considering and making recommendations on matters that the assembly has referred to it; it cannot take up other matters or vote directly on the assembly's business. The purpose of a committee of the whole is to relax the usual limits on debate, allowing a more open exchange of views without the urgency of a final vote. Debates in a committee of the whole may be recorded but are often excluded from the assembly's minutes. After debating, the committee submits its conclusions to the assembly (that is, to itself) and business continues according to the normal rules.

In legislative assemblies in the Commonwealth of Nations, the committee stage of important bills is typically conducted by the committee of the whole, whereas lesser bills may be considered in smaller committees. Outside the Commonwealth (for example, in continental European parliaments), the practice of committees of the whole does not exist – meetings of the entire membership are held according to the plenary sitting's rules, and the section-by-section vote on bills occurs in the plenum of the chamber.

== Australia ==
Since 1994, the Australian House of Representatives no longer has a committee of the whole in the same vein as other legislatures in the Commonwealth. After the second reading, bills that were considered in a committee of the whole prior to 1994 instead proceed to a consideration in detail stage in which amendments to the bill may be similarly considered. The key difference with this change is that amendments are now considered by the plenary of the chamber, which means that the usual Westminster parliamentary conventions on committee stages do not apply (e.g. the Speaker is permitted to chair the committee stage and may remain in the Speaker's chair) and there is no subsequent report stage. Bills may still be referred to other committees, including the then-newly established Federation Chamber (then called the "Main Committee"), in which case the usual committee procedures are unchanged.

In the Australian Senate, the committee of the whole remains in use for consideration of bills and is provided for by chapter 21 of the standing orders. It is presided over by the Chairman of Committees.

Subnationally, most of the states have adopted the "consideration in detail" method for their lower houses, as have both self-governing territories. The South Australian House of Assembly and Tasmanian House of Assembly continue to use the committee of the whole procedure, as do all the extant upper houses.

== Canada ==
In the House of Commons of Canada, a Committee of the Whole (French: comité plénier) is chaired by the deputy speaker or the deputy chair of committees. In the past, the Committee of the Whole considered a majority of bills, with few bills being sent to parliamentary committees. The increased workload of MPs has led to a decline in this use of the Committee of the Whole. Now the Committee of the Whole is used mostly for monetary bills and on rare occasions to expedite the passage of other legislation.

On June 11, 2008, Prime Minister Stephen Harper formally apologized in the House of Commons for the government's historical role in the Canadian residential school system. A Committee of the Whole was used, so that aboriginal leaders (who were not Members of Parliament) could be allowed to respond to the apology on the floor of the House.

At the provincial and territorial level, committees of the whole continue to be frequently used by jurisdictions with smaller legislative assemblies.

== Hong Kong ==
In the Legislative Council of Hong Kong, when the debate of the second reading resumes, members debate the general merits and principles of the bill. At the committee stage, the Legislative Council becomes a "Committee of the whole Council" and goes through the bill clause by clause, making amendments where necessary. After the bill has passed through Committee with or without amendments, it proceeds to the third reading for passage by the Council.

== Philippines ==
Each chamber of the Congress of the Philippines constitutes itself to a committee on a whole acting upon a bill or resolution. The House of Representatives has constituted itself to a committee of the whole to tackle the 2019 budget, extension of martial law in Mindanao, and proposing constitutional amendments.

== United Kingdom ==
In the House of Commons of the United Kingdom, the Committee of the whole House is used instead of a standing committee for the clause-by-clause debate of important or contentious bills. The Chairman of Ways and Means presides in this instance. The Committee originated as means to consider legislation without the presence of royal officers and without a formal record being made of the proceedings. The Speaker was not only relieved of his chair but also excluded from the chamber since he was then regarded as partial to the Crown.

In the House of Lords, the Committee of the Whole House examines the majority of bills.

== United States ==
The United States House of Representatives has one Committee of the Whole, called the "Committee of the Whole House on the State of the Union", with original consideration of all bills that include tax increase or outlay provisions. This committee also receives the President's State of the Union message and historically was responsible for dividing it among other committees, but that is no longer the case. The Speaker of the House designates a member to preside over the Committee, who is normally a member of the majority party who does not hold the chair of a standing committee. Other committees of the whole have existed historically but have been discontinued.

The United States Senate considered matters in Quasi-Committee of the Whole (described below) for 197 years from the 1st Congress in 1789 and ceased using it in 1986 during the 99th Congress.

== Non-legislative use and variants ==
Under Robert's Rules of Order an assembly may move to commit to the committee of the whole, or simply to go into a committee of the whole at the suggestion of the presider and without objection. Upon a successful motion to go into a committee of the whole, the presiding officer designates a member to preside over the committee and yields the chair. The committee may proceed on the referred subject by debating it, considering amendments, or adopting recommendations. To conclude its proceedings, the committee votes to "rise and report". The presiding officer of the assembly then resumes the chair and accepts a report from the presiding officer of the committee. The more relaxed committee debating rules are enforced, for example, members may speak on a question more than once in a committee of the whole, but members who have not already spoken have priority. While sitting as a committee of the whole, an assembly can consider only that matter (or matters) referred to it: unrelated motions are out of order.

Smaller assemblies can avoid the formalities of committing and reporting by considering a matter as if in a committee of the whole, or by considering it informally. Either option opens debate in the manner of the committee of the whole, but the presiding officer retains the chair. In the former case, also called a quasi-committee of the whole, all amendment adoptions are tentative and open debate ends when the assembly adopts a motion other than an amendment. The chair then announces the amendments that were adopted in quasi-committee, which are subject to a confirming vote. In the latter option, votes are binding on the assembly and any successful motion to dispose of the current main motion ends the informal debate.

Going into a committee of the whole or quasi committee of the whole are alternatives to taking a straw poll (which is not allowed according to Robert's Rules).

The Standard Code of Parliamentary Procedure rejects both the committee of the whole and quasi committee of the whole procedures as being outdated, and instead recommends the motion to consider informally in their place.
