= Agenda (meeting) =

List of items to be taken up during a meeting

An agenda is a list of meeting activities in the order in which they are to be taken up, beginning with the call to order and ending with adjournment. It usually includes one or more specific items of business to be acted upon. It may, but is not required to, include specific times for one or more activities. An agenda may also be called a docket, schedule, or calendar. It may also contain a listing of an order of business.

== Etymology ==
Agenda is an abbreviation agenda sunt or agendum est, gerundive forms in plural and singular respectively of the Latin verb ago, agere, egi, actum "to drive on, set in motion", for example of cattle. The meaning is "(those things/that thing) which must be driven forward". What is now known in English as an agenda is a list of individual items which must be "acted upon" or processed, usually those matters which must be discussed at a business meeting. Although the Latin word is in a plural form, as a borrowed word in English, the word is singular and has a plural of "agendas".

== Explanation ==
An agenda lists the items of business to be taken up during a meeting or session. It may also be called a "calendar". A meeting agenda may be headed with the date, time and location of the meeting, followed by a series of points outlining the order in which the business is to be conducted. Steps on any agenda can include any type of schedule or order the group wants to follow. Agendas may take different forms depending on the specific purpose of the group and may include any number of the items.

In business meetings of a deliberative assembly, the items on the agenda are also known as the orders of the day. Optimally, the agenda is distributed to a meeting's participants prior to the meeting, so that they will be aware of the subjects to be discussed, and are able to prepare for the meeting accordingly.

In a workshop, the sequence of agenda items is important, as later agenda steps may be dependent upon information derived from or completion of earlier steps in the agenda. Frequently in standard meetings, agenda items may be "time boxed" or fixed so as not to exceed a predetermined amount of time. In workshops, time boxing may not be effective because completion of each agenda step may be critical to beginning the next step.

In parliamentary procedure, an agenda is not binding upon an assembly unless its own rules make it so, or unless it has been adopted as the agenda for the meeting by majority vote at the start of the meeting. Otherwise, it is merely for the guidance of the chair.

If an agenda is binding upon an assembly, and a specific time is listed for an item, that item cannot be taken up before that time, and must be taken up when that time arrives even if other business is pending. If it is desired to do otherwise, the rules can be suspended for that purpose.

== Order of business ==
In parliamentary procedure, an order of business, as the name may suggest, is the sequence of items that is to be taken up during a meeting. This sequence may be a standard order of business or a sequence listed on an agenda that the assembly has agreed to follow.

=== Standard Order of Business ===
Robert's Rules of Order Newly Revised (RONR) has the following standard order of business:

1. Reading and approval of minutes
2. Reports of officers, boards and standing committees
3. Reports of special committees
4. Special orders
5. Unfinished business and general orders
6. New business

The above standard order of business has been found to be appropriate for meetings in most organizations.

The "special orders" and "general orders" refer to items of business that usually come from a previous meeting (the word "order" in these two cases do not refer to "sequence" but instead is more like a "command" in its meaning). Usually items become special orders or general orders by adoption of the motion to postpone. A difference between these orders is that, in general, a special order can interrupt other business when the time comes for its consideration, while a general order waits until the pending business is taken care of. For example, say a motion is being considered and then postponed to the next meeting. This postponed motion becomes a general order for the next meeting. When the time for "general orders" comes up in the order of business, consideration of the postponed motion is resumed.

"New business" is where the bulk of the discussion as well as decisions in the meeting usually takes place. If a group has not adopted an agenda or an order of business, all of its business would be considered "new business".

=== Optional headings ===
Organizations may have the following optional headings in their order of business:

- Opening ceremonies - Items may include invocation, singing of the national anthem, reciting of the pledge of allegiance, reading of the mission of the organization, recognition of dignitaries, etc.
- Roll call (taking of attendance)
- Review and adoption of the agenda
- Consent calendar - tool used by deliberative assemblies with a heavy workload to consider a series of items in bulk with a single vote
- Good of the order, General Good and Welfare, or Open Forum - for other issues to allow a participant to raise another point for discussion
- Announcements - may include review of key points, discussion of assignments, communications plan for what to tell others not in the meeting, and confirmation of the next meeting, if any
- Program (such as an educational talk, film, or guest speaker)

An agenda may list any of the above items.

Call for the orders of the day (RONR)
- Class: Privileged motion
- In order when another has the floor?: Yes
- Requires second?: No
- Debatable?: No
- May be reconsidered?: No
- Amendable?: No
- Vote required: A single member can demand it without a vote; Two-thirds vote to set aside the orders of the day

== Call for the orders of the day ==
A call for the orders of the day, in parliamentary procedure, is a motion to require a deliberative assembly to conform to its agenda or order of business.

In Robert's Rules of Order Newly Revised (RONR), the "call" may be made by one member, and does not require a second. The chair must then proceed to the scheduled item of business, unless the assembly decides otherwise by a two-thirds vote.

The Standard Code of Parliamentary Procedure does not have this motion and instead suggests that a member can request that the body take up the scheduled item of business, or make a more formal point of order.

In historical writing, the expression "order of the day", as in "abolition meetings became the order of the day", refers to an activity that was widespread, replacing other activities, at a particular moment in history.

== See also ==
- Minutes
