= Postpone indefinitely =

Postpone indefinitely (RONR)
- Class: Subsidiary motion
- In order when another has the floor?: No
- Requires second?: Yes
- Debatable?: Yes; debate can go into main question
- May be reconsidered?: Affirmative vote only
- Amendable?: No
- Vote required: Majority

In parliamentary procedure, the motion to postpone indefinitely is a subsidiary motion used to kill a main motion without taking a direct vote on it. This motion does not actually "postpone" it.

== Explanation and use ==
In Robert's Rules of Order Newly Revised (RONR), the effect of the motion, if adopted, is not to "postpone" the main motion, but rather to prevent action on it for the duration of the current session. It can be used when the assembly does not wish to adopt a motion, but explicitly rejecting it would perhaps be embarrassing, such as a motion to endorse a candidate for a political office.

The motion to postpone indefinitely is the lowest-ranking of all motions other than the main motion, and therefore it cannot be made while any other subsidiary, privileged or incidental motion is pending.

Because debate on the motion to postpone indefinitely may go into the merits of the pending main motion, it may provide members of the assembly with additional opportunities to debate the main motion beyond the number of speeches normally permitted by the rules. It can also be used by opponents of a main motion to test whether they have the votes needed to defeat the main motion, without risking a direct vote. If the motion to postpone indefinitely is defeated, direct consideration of the main motion is resumed, and opponents of the motion may then determine whether to continue in their effort to defeat the main motion.

== Improper use of tabling a motion ==
Using the rules in RONR, a main motion is improperly killed by tabling it. In this case, it would have been proper to make a motion to postpone indefinitely.

The Standard Code of Parliamentary Procedure (TSC) does not have the motion to postpone indefinitely, and instead recommends use of this book's version of the motion to table (this version of "table" is different from that in RONR), which under these circumstances would require a two-thirds vote.
