= Meeting (parliamentary procedure) =

In parliamentary procedure, gathering of a group of people to make decisions

A meeting is a gathering of a group of people to make decisions. This sense of "meeting" may be different from the general sense in that a meeting in general may not necessarily be conducted for the purpose of making decisions.

Each meeting may be a separate session or not part of a group of meetings constituting a session. Meetings vary in their frequency, with certain actions being affected depending on whether the meetings are held more than a quarterly time interval apart. There are different types of meetings, such as a regular meeting, special meeting, or annual meeting. Each meeting may have an agenda, which lists the business that is to come up during the meeting. A record of the meeting is summarized in the minutes.

== Session ==
A session can be a meeting or series of connected meetings devoted to a single order of business, program, agenda, or announced purpose. An organization's bylaws may define a specific meaning of the term "session." In most organizations, each session consists of only a single meeting (i.e. "session" and "meeting" are equivalent terms in this case).

The significance of a session is that one session generally cannot make decisions that bind a group at a future session. A session has implications for the renewability of motions. The same or substantially the same question cannot be brought up twice in the same session except by means of the motions that bring a question again before the assembly.

== Quarterly time interval ==
A quarterly time interval represents a time limitation on the taking or postponement of certain actions. No more than a quarterly time interval between two sessions exists when "the second session begins at any time during or before the third calendar month after the calendar month in which the first session ends." For example, if a meeting takes place in January, the other meeting is within a quarterly time interval when the previous meeting is on or after 1 October of the preceding calendar year or when the next meeting occurs on or before 30 April of the current year.

A motion may not be postponed to the next meeting if that meeting is scheduled for more than a quarterly time interval away. If a body's next meeting is more than a quarterly time interval away, it is customary to appoint a board or committee to approve the minutes of the current meeting. A motion which has been laid on the table at a meeting and not taken from the table before the end of the meeting will die if the next meeting is more than a quarterly time interval away, whereas if the next meeting is within a quarterly time interval, the motion may be taken from the table at that meeting.

== Types of meetings ==
Robert's Rules of Order Newly Revised describes the following types of meetings:

- Regular meeting – a meeting normally scheduled by the organization at set intervals. For example, it could be a weekly or monthly meeting of the organization.
- Special meeting – a meeting scheduled separately from a regular meeting, as the need arises.
- Adjourned meeting – a meeting that is continued from a regular meeting or a special meeting (also called a "continued meeting"). This meeting is scheduled by a motion to do so.
- Annual meeting – a meeting held every year. This meeting may be different from the regular meetings in that there may be elections or annual reports from officers that only take place at such a meeting.
- Executive session – a meeting in which the proceedings are secret, or confidential.
- Public session – a meeting, usually of a governmental body, that is open to the general public. For government bodies, such meetings may be required to be open to the public due to open meeting laws.
- Electronic meetings – a meeting held by electronic means, such as the internet. Any of the above types of meetings could also be held as an "electronic" meeting.

Groups may also gather at conventions which may have several meetings over a day or a week or more. The conventions may be held in connection with the organization's annual meeting.

== Call of the meeting ==
A "call" of the meeting is a notice of the time and place which is sent in advance to inform the members. Usually the secretary of the organization is responsible for sending out the call. The call may also include an agenda or a listing of items of business to come up at the meeting. Organizations may have a requirement of how much notice is needed for the call. For example, a call may be required to be sent at least 30 days in advance of the meeting.

This sense of a "call" of the meeting is distinct from "calling the meeting to order", which means that the meeting is beginning.

== Agenda ==
An agenda is a list of meeting activities in the order in which they are to be taken up, beginning with the call to order and ending with adjournment. It usually includes one or more specific items of business to be acted upon. It may, but is not required to, include specific times for one or more activities.

== Procedures for conducting a meeting ==
Organizations have their own rules on conducting meetings. Most organizations in the United States use Robert's Rules of Order as a supplemental guide to their rules. Outside of the United States, organizations may follow rules that are similar to those in Parliament.

== Minutes ==
Minutes, also known as protocols or, informally, notes, are the instant written record of a meeting or hearing. They typically describe the events of the meeting and may include a list of attendees, a statement of the issues considered by the participants, and related responses or decisions for the issues.

== See also ==
- Deliberative assembly
- Legislative session
