= Bonser method =

The Bonser method is used to prioritize motions proposed in a democratic meeting. Voters cast red, yellow or green votes for each motion. Red means "I understand this motion and am opposed to it", green means "I understand this motion and am in favour of it", and, yellow means either "I wish to learn more about this motion" or "I do not like this motion's present wording, but I think the concept has merit."

In a Bonser method vote the proportion of green votes required to adopt a motion and the proportion of red votes required to reject a motion is more than 60% of votes cast. Motions voted yellow are typically sent to a workshop for refinement and improvement.

This method was named after its inventor, Canadian Greg Bonser.

Greg Bonser introduced his colour-coded voting system at a Green Party of Ontario convention in 2003 held in Toronto, Canada. He explained to the delegates that his voting system would facilitate counting the yea (green) and then the nay(red) votes for each policy in an orderly and accurate manner, but it would also open the door for policies that were worthy of consideration, but not as presented, and could be sent to workshop (yellow), and then they could be reintroduced for voting by the delegates. The delegates voted unanimously in favour of Greg's new voting system, and all delegates were handed a packet of green, red, and yellow sheets of paper.

Surprisingly, as a result of the Bonser Method, policies were speedily voted on in an orderly fashion, unlike previous conventions. With the extra time available, delegates volunteered to workshop the policies that had been voted yellow. The workshop groups reported back to the delegates on the modified policies before the end of the day, and were voted green (yea) or red (nay) by the delegates.

The Bonser Method has been adopted by the other political parties in Canada, and possibly elsewhere as it is a voting system that works well as well as encouraging collaboration.
