= Point of order =

Parliamentary procedure drawing attention to a rules violation

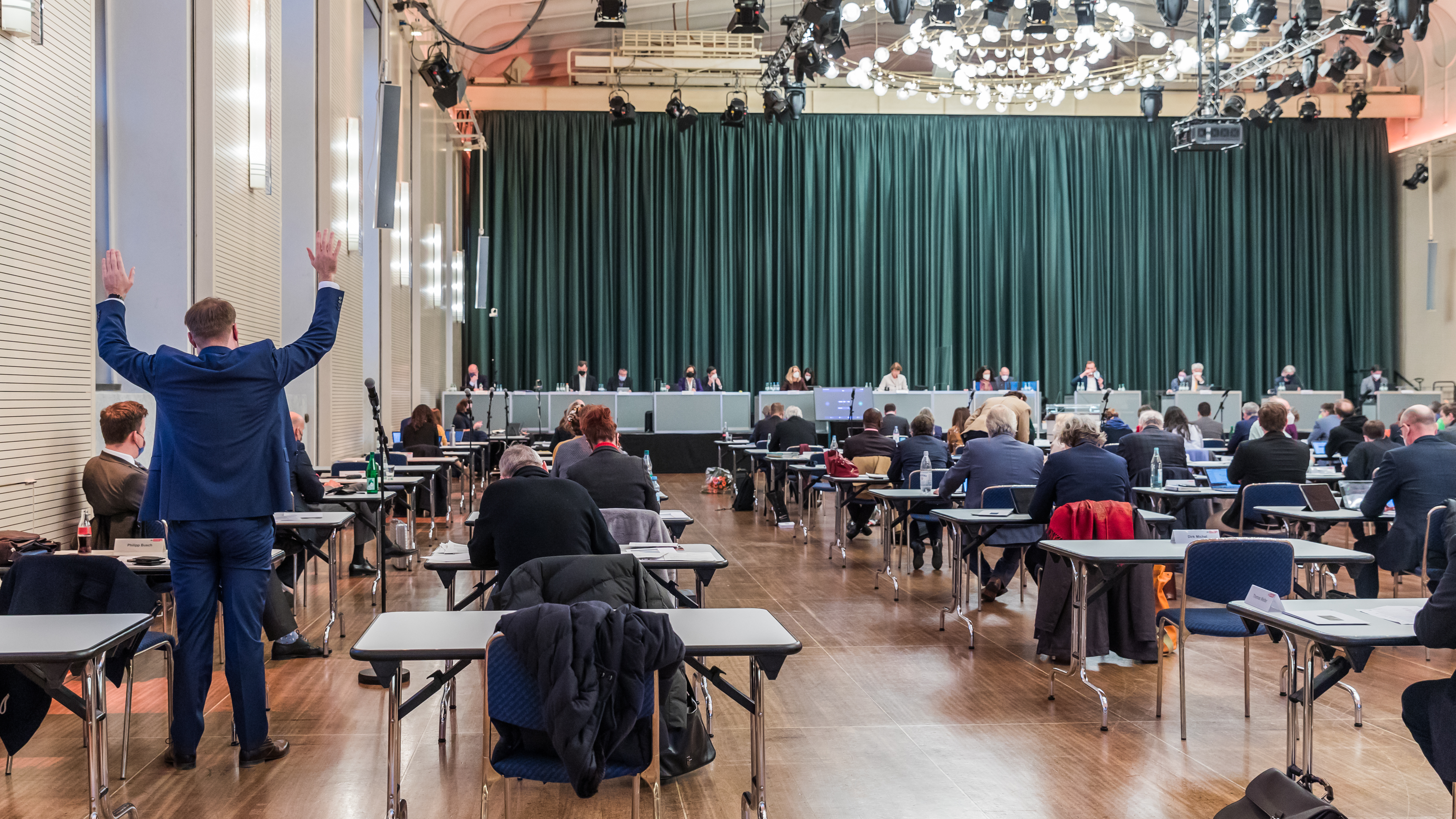
A member of the Cologne City Council holds up two hands, indicating he wishes to raise a point of order.

In parliamentary procedure, a point of order occurs when someone draws attention to a rules violation in a meeting of a deliberative assembly.

== Explanation and uses ==
Point of order (RONR)
- Class: Incidental motion
- In order when another has the floor?: Yes
- Requires second?: No
- Debatable?: No (but chair can permit explanation), unless it is submitted to the assembly for a vote
- May be reconsidered?: No, unless it is submitted to the assembly for a vote
- Amendable?: No
- Vote required: Is ruled by the chair, unless it is submitted to the assembly for a vote (then it requires a majority vote)

In Robert's Rules of Order Newly Revised (RONR), a point of order may be raised if the rules appear to have been broken. This may interrupt a speaker during debate, or anything else if the breach of the rules warrants it. The point is resolved before business continues.

The point of order calls upon the chair to make a ruling. The chair may rule on the point of order or submit it to the judgment of the assembly. If the chair accepts the point of order, it is said to be ruled "well taken". If not, it is said to be ruled "not well taken".

Generally, a point of order must be raised at the time the rules are broken or else it would be too late. For example, if a motion was made and discussion began on it, it would be too late to raise a point of order that the motion was not seconded. If such a motion was adopted without a second, it remains valid and not having a second becomes irrelevant.

Exceptions to the rule that a point of order must be raised at the time of violation include that a point of order may be raised at any time a motion was adopted in violation of the bylaws or applicable law, in conflict with a previously adopted motion (unless adopted by the vote to rescind it), or in violation of a fundamental principle of parliamentary law.

The ruling of the chair may be appealed to the assembly in most cases. A majority vote against the chair's ruling is required to overturn it.

A point of order is sometimes erroneously used to present a request for information or a parliamentary inquiry. If a member asks such a question, the chair should treat the question as the appropriate request.

== Legislative use ==
=== Australia ===
In the Australian House of Representatives a member may raise a point of order with the speaker at any time, including interrupting another member who is speaking. Once raised a point of order results in the suspension of all other business until the speaker has given a ruling. A member may dissent from the ruling of a speaker, which must be declared at once, a motion submitted in writing to that effect and the motion must be seconded. The speaker must then propose the question, which is debatable.

Deriving from British practice, and due to the requirement to remain seated during a division, in the Australian House of Representatives it continues to be customary for a member raising a point of order while the House is voting to hold a sheet of paper over the top of their head.

=== India ===
In the Indian Parliament, both the Lok Sabha and the Rajya Sabha, a point of order can raised in relation to the business before the House by any member of the parliament. The decision of the chair is final and no debate is allowed on the point of order, though the chair may hear members before giving the decision.

=== Ireland ===
In the Irish Oireachtas (parliament), a point of order can be used in relation to order in the assembly. However, the ruling of the chair in this assembly cannot be appealed.

=== United Kingdom ===
Until 1998 in the British House of Commons, it was required that a member raising a point of order while the House is voting must speak "seated and covered", i.e. wearing a hat. Two opera hats were maintained in the House for this purpose, with members of parliament sometimes covering their head with an Order Paper while the hat was retrieved. This practice was abolished in accordance with the findings of the Select Committee on the Modernisation of the House of Commons, who said that the practice "has almost certainly brought the House into greater ridicule than almost any other, particularly since the advent of television".

=== United States ===
In the United States Senate, the chair's ruling on a point of order may be appealed by any senator. Points of order with regard to the Budget Act or annual budget resolution may be waived by 3/5 of the Senate's entire membership. Rule XVI, which prohibits normal legislation in appropriations legislation, may be waived by 2/3 of the Senate.

The United States House of Representatives also allows points of order and appeals, although they are very rare following the abolishment of open rules in 2016, as they are routinely waived by the United States House Committee on Rules.

== See also ==
- Appeal (motion)
- Nuclear option
