= Legislative motion =

The term legislative motion has different meanings in different legislatures, and may refer to:

- Bill (proposed law)
- Motion (parliamentary procedure)
- Private member's bill
