= Directors register =

In corporate law, the directors register is a list of the directors elected by the shareholders, generally stored in the company's minute book. By law, companies are required to keep this list up to date to remove those directors who are deceased or resign, and to add those who have been elected by the shareholders However, the register must also list any person who had been a director indefinitely. The record must indicate the dates a director started and stopped holding office. As directors carry certain personal legal obligations to a corporation (for example, being responsible for any money held in trust for another person, e.g. sales taxes not remitted to a government), those seeking recourse against directors are allowed to rely on the directors register as proof that a director held office on any particular day.

In many jurisdictions, corporations are required to keep the list of directors up to date with the corporate affairs office where the corporation was incorporated. This is so that both government agencies and interested third parties may be aware of the name and address of directors (for example, in order to serve a statement of claim on the corporation).

Publicly traded corporations are usually required to notify the appropriate securities and exchange commission about any change to their directors register.
