= Parliamentary inquiry =

Parliamentary inquiry may refer to:

- Parliamentary inquiry (parliamentary procedure), a question about procedure
- Parliamentary inquiry committee, a legislative commission that investigates and reports on particular events or topics

== See also ==
- Public inquiry
- Royal commission
