= Battle for the Paddle =

American college football rivalry

- Nicholls Colonels Texas State Bobcats
- Sport: Football
- First meeting: October 4, 1980; Nicholls State, 24–21
- Latest meeting: September 20, 2025; Texas State, 35–3
- Trophy: Paddle Trophy

Statistics
- Total meetings: 32
- All-time series: Texas State leads, 17–15
- Largest victory: Nicholls State, 63–37 (1993)
- Longest win streak: 3 games, three times by Nicholls, and three times by Texas State
- Current win streak: Texas State, 3 (2011–present)

Locations of Nicholls and Texas State

The Battle for the Paddle is an American college football rivalry game played between the Texas State Bobcats and the Nicholls Colonels. The rivalry began between the two schools as an in-conference rivalry, first in the Gulf Star Conference and then the Southland Conference. The name for the rivalry originated as a result of a game postponement during the 1998 season. Prior to the game, heavy rains flooded San Marcos, Texas and the field at Texas State. Athletic directors and coaches from both schools decided to postpone the game and coined the annual contest the "Battle for the Paddle," joking that fans and athletes needed to use a boat and paddle to get to the game. The game eventually took place on November 28, 1998, with Texas State prevailing 28–27 to win the Paddle Trophy.

Nicholls head coach and offensive guru Charlie Stubbs brought controversy to the rivalry in 2011, when he refused to bring the Paddle Trophy to San Marcos due to Texas State having a scholarship advantage as an FCS transitional school, stating "we ain't bringing the damn thing." Texas State won the Battle for the Paddle 38–12. Since Texas State's ascension to the FBS, the teams do not meet as frequently. The two teams met in 2019, with Texas State winning 24–3. Their last meeting was on Sep. 20, 2025 in San Marcos. The Bobcats won that matchup 35–3.

Texas State leads the overall series, 17–15.

== Game results ==
Nicholls victories	Texas State victories

No.	Date	Location	Winner	Score
1	October 4, 1980	Thibodaux, LA	Nicholls State	24–21
2	September 18, 1982	San Marcos, TX	Southwest Texas State	14–7
3	November 10, 1984	San Marcos, TX	Nicholls State	30–14
4	October 26, 1985	Thibodaux, LA	Nicholls State	20–12
5	October 25, 1986	San Marcos, TX	Nicholls State	35–21
6	October 24, 1987	Thibodaux, LA	Southwest Texas State	31–16
7	October 29, 1988	San Marcos, TX	Nicholls State	13–10
8	October 21, 1989	Thibodaux, LA	Nicholls State	22–21
9	September 29, 1990	San Marcos, TX	Southwest Texas State	33–30
10	September 28, 1991	Thibodaux, LA	Southwest Texas State	19–10
11	October 3, 1992	San Marcos, TX	Southwest Texas State	38–13
12	October 23, 1993	Thibodaux, LA	Nicholls State	63–37
13	October 22, 1994	San Marcos, TX	Southwest Texas State	27–26
14	October 21, 1995	Thibodaux, LA	Southwest Texas State	35–25
15	September 21, 1996	San Marcos, TX	Nicholls State	49–36
16	October 11, 1997	Thibodaux, LA	Nicholls State	29–28
17	November 28, 1998	San Marcos, TX	Southwest Texas State	28–27

No.	Date	Location	Winner	Score
18	October 9, 1999	Thibodaux, LA	Southwest Texas State	16–0
19	October 7, 2000	San Marcos, TX	Southwest Texas State	25–0
20	October 27, 2001	Thibodaux, LA	Nicholls State	33–14
21	October 19, 2002	San Marcos, TX	Nicholls State	24–21
22	November 6, 2003	Thibodaux, LA	Texas State	13–0†
23	November 13, 2004	San Marcos, TX	Texas State	35–12
24	October 29, 2005	Thibodaux, LA	Nicholls State	32–29
25	November 4, 2006	San Marcos, TX	Nicholls State	21–19
26	November 10, 2007	Thibodaux, LA	Nicholls State	52–28
27	November 15, 2008	San Marcos, TX	Texas State	34–10
28	October 17, 2009	Thibodaux, LA	Texas State	34–28
29	October 16, 2010	San Marcos, TX	Nicholls State	47–45
30	October 1, 2011	San Marcos, TX	Texas State	38–12
31	September 28, 2019	San Marcos, TX	Texas State	24–3
32	September 20, 2025	San Marcos, TX	Texas State	35–3
Series: Texas State leads 17–15
† Nicholls State forfeited 2003 win due to an ineligible player.

== See also ==
- List of NCAA college football rivalry games
