= Floor (legislative) =

The floor of a legislature or chamber is the place where members sit and make speeches. When a person is speaking there formally, they are said to have the floor. The House of Commons and the House of Lords of the United Kingdom; the U.S. House of Representatives and the U.S. Senate all have "floors" with established procedures and protocols.

Activity on the floor of a council or legislature, such as debate, may be contrasted with meetings and discussion which takes place in committee, for which there are often separate committee rooms. Some actions, such as the overturning of an executive veto, may only be taken on the floor.

== United Kingdom ==
In the United Kingdom's House of Commons a rectangular configuration is used with the government ministers and their party sitting on the right of the presiding Speaker and the opposing parties sitting on the benches opposite. Members are not permitted to speak between the red lines on the floor which mark the boundaries of each side. These are traditionally two sword lengths apart to mitigate the possibility of physical conflict. If a member changes allegiance between the two sides, they are said to cross the floor. Only members and the essential officers of the house such as the clerks are permitted upon the floor while parliament is in session.

== United States ==
The two important debating floors of the U.S. Federal government are in the House of Representatives and the Senate. The rules of procedure of both floors have evolved to change the balance of power and decision making between the floors and the committees. Both floors were publicly televised by 1986. The procedures for passing legislation are quite varied with differing degrees of party, committee and conference involvement. In general, during the late 20th century, the power of the floors increased and the number of amendments made on the floor increased significantly.

== Procedures ==
The procedures used upon legislative floors are based upon standard works which include

- Erskine May: Parliamentary Practice, which was written for the UK House of Commons
- Jefferson's Manual, which was written for the US Senate and was incorporated into the rules for the US House of Representatives.

== Use in other assemblies ==
In other deliberative assemblies, the concept of a "floor" may also be used. The following work was initially based on the procedures used upon legislative floors:

- Robert's Rules of Order, which was based upon the rules of the US House of Representatives and is intended for use by ordinary bodies and societies.

== See also ==
- Floor of the United States House of Representatives
- Floor leader
- Plenary session
- Recognition (parliamentary procedure) - assignment of the floor
