= The Standard Code =

The Standard Code may refer to:

- The Standard Code of Parliamentary Procedure
- The Standard Code or the standard code in genetics refers to the standard genetic code, described at Genetic code#RNA codon table (see also DNA codon table)
