= Motion to sit in private =

Motion in parliamentary procedure

In parliamentary procedure, the motion to sit in private is a proposal that a deliberative assembly consider its business, or part thereof, in camera, meaning with only members of the assembly taking part and without records of the sitting being made public.

== By country ==
=== France ===
Article 33 of the Constitution of France dictates that "each House may sit in camera at the request of the Prime Minister or of one tenth of its members".

=== Italy ===
In each house of the Italian Parliament, if either one tenth of all members or the Government (usually represented either by the Prime Minister or by the Minister for Relations with Parliament) move to sit in private, the proposal is immediately put up to a vote without debate.

=== United Kingdom ===
The motion to sit in private, due to its nature as a privileged motion, is often used as a way to ascertain whether or not a quorum is present. Only one motion to sit in private per sitting may be made.

The standing orders of both Houses prescribe that if a division is called, and fewer than a certain number of members participate in it, consideration of the main motion is postponed. In the House of Commons, the required number is forty, while in the House of Lords the required number is thirty. (Note: This only applies to votes on bills, amendments to bills, and draft orders. A vote on a non-binding motion is valid regardless of how many Members are present.)

Opponents of a bill can therefore delay the bill's advancement by moving to sit in private when they notice there are few members on the floor of the House. This may lead to a division, which can prove the lack of a quorum. This technique has a greater possibility of succeeding when Private Members' Bills, which are not necessarily backed by the Government and do not always attract the interest of an outright majority of members, are considered.

To prevent this from happening, supporters of a bill often move themselves to sit in private at the beginning of the debate, when the number of MPs attending is usually higher.
