= Hoist (motion) =

A hoist motion is used in Canadian legislative bodies to cause a bill not to be read now, but six months hence, or any number of months hence. In the House of Commons, if a hoist motion is adopted, it has the effect of defeating the bill.
