= Minutes =

Written details of a meeting

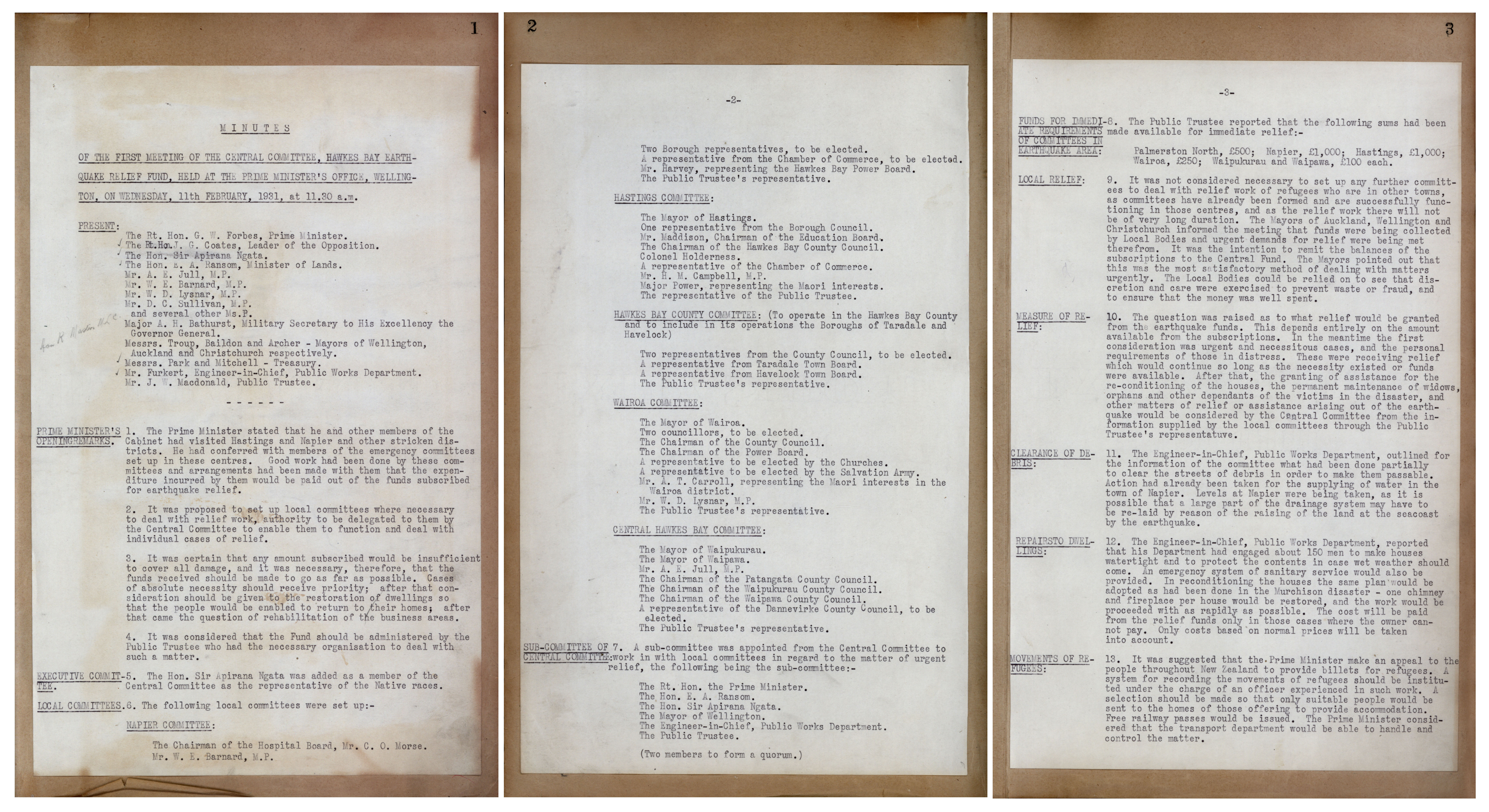
The minutes of the first meeting of the Hawkes Bay Earthquake Relief Fund Committee

Minutes (/ˈmɪn.ɪts, -əts/), also known as minutes of meeting, protocols or, informally, notes, are the instant written record of a meeting or hearing. They typically describe the events of the meeting and may include a list of attendees, a statement of the activities considered by the participants, and related responses or decisions for the activities. The word "minutes" here means "notes", rather than sixtieths of an hour.

== Creation ==
Minutes may be created during the meeting by a typist or court reporter, who may use shorthand notation and then prepare the minutes and issue them to the participants afterwards. Alternatively, the meeting can be audio recorded, video recorded, or a group's appointed or informally assigned secretary may take notes, with minutes prepared later.

== Purpose ==
Minutes are the official written record of the meetings of an organization or group. They are not transcripts of those proceedings. Using Robert's Rules of Order Newly Revised (RONR), the minutes should contain mainly a record of what was done at the meeting, not what was said by the members. The organization may have its own rules regarding the content of the minutes.

For most organizations or groups, it is important for the minutes to be terse and only include a summary of the decisions. A verbatim report (transcript) is typically not useful. Unless the organization's rules require it, a summary of the discussions in a meeting is neither necessary nor appropriate.

The minutes of certain groups, such as a corporate board of directors, must be kept on file and are important legal documents. Minutes from board meetings are kept separately from minutes of general membership meetings within the same organization. Also, minutes of executive sessions may be kept separately. Committees are not required to keep formal minutes although less formal notes may be taken. For committees, their formal records are the reports submitted to their parent body.

== Format ==
The format of the minutes can vary depending on the standards established by an organization, although there are general guidelines.

Generally, minutes begin with the name of the body holding the meeting (e.g., a board) and may also include the place, date, list of people present, and the time that the chair called the meeting to order.

Since the primary function of minutes is to record the decisions made, all official decisions must be included. If a formal motion is proposed and seconded, then (regardless whether it passes) this is recorded. The voting tally may also be included. The part of the minutes dealing with a routine motion might note merely that a particular motion was "moved by Ann and passed". It is not strictly necessary to include the name of the person who seconds a motion. Where a tally is included, it is sufficient to record the number of people voting for and against a motion, but requests by participants to note their votes by name may be allowed. If a decision is made by roll-call vote, then all of the individual votes are recorded by name. If it is made by general consent without a formal vote, then this fact may be recorded.

The minutes may end with a note of the time that the meeting was adjourned.

Minutes are sometimes submitted by the person who is responsible for them (often the secretary) at a subsequent meeting for review. The traditional closing phrase is "Respectfully submitted" (although this is no longer common), followed by the officer's signature, his or her typed (or printed) name, and his or her title. That closing phrase developed from "respectively submitted", expressing a claim that the order in which the various events are recorded in the minutes matches the order in which they occurred during the actual meeting.

Usually, one of the first items in an order of business or an agenda for a meeting is the reading and approval of the minutes from the previous meeting. If the members of the group agree (usually by unanimous consent) that the written minutes reflect what happened at the previous meeting, then they are approved, and the fact of their approval is recorded in the minutes of the current meeting. If there are significant errors or omissions, then the minutes may be redrafted and submitted again at a later date. Minor changes may be made immediately using the normal amendment procedures, and the amended minutes may be approved "as amended". It is normally appropriate to send a draft copy of the minutes to all the members in advance of the meeting so that the meeting is not delayed by a reading of the draft.

== See also ==
- Diary
- Gazette
- Hansard
