= Motion (parliamentary procedure) =

Type of parliamentary procedure

In parliamentary procedure, a motion is a formal proposal by a member of a deliberative assembly that the assembly take a particular action. These may include legislative motions, budgetary motions, supplementary budgetary motions, and petitionary motions.

The possible motions in a deliberative assembly are determined by a pre-agreed volume detailing the correct parliamentary procedure, such as Robert's Rules of Order; The Standard Code of Parliamentary Procedure; or Lord Citrine's The ABC of Chairmanship. Motions are used in conducting business in almost all legislative bodies worldwide, and are used in meetings of many church vestries, corporate boards, and fraternal organizations.

Motions can bring new business before the assembly or consist of numerous other proposals to take procedural steps or carry out other actions relating to a pending proposal (such as postponing it to another time) or to the assembly itself (such as taking a recess).

== Purpose ==
A motion is a formal proposal by a member to do something. Motions are the basis of the group decision-making process. They focus the group on what is being decided.

According to Robert's Rules, generally, a motion should be phrased in a way to take an action or express an opinion. A motion not to do something should not be offered, says Roberts, if the same result can happen without anything being done. Such a motion could result in confusion if the assembly does not want to not do it.

== Process of handling motions ==
The process of handling motions generally involves the following steps, depending on the motion and the rules of order in use:

1. A member obtains the floor and makes a motion.
2. Another member seconds the motion.
3. The chair states the motion.
4. Members debate the motion.
5. The chair puts the motion to a vote.
6. The chair announces the results of the vote and what happens with the motion.

== Proposing motions ==
A motion is proposed by a member of the body, for the consideration of the body as a whole. Generally, the person making the motion, known as the mover, must first be recognized by the chairman as being entitled to speak; this is known as obtaining the floor.

Once the mover has obtained the floor, the mover states the motion, normally prefixed with the phrase "I move." For instance, at a meeting, a member may say, "I move that the group donate $5 to Wikipedia."

Instead of being given verbally, a motion may be made in writing, in which case it is called a proposed or draft resolution. If the motion is in writing, the mover says "I move the resolution at the desk" or "I move the following resolution" and then reads it.

Generally, once the motion has been proposed, consideration by the assembly occurs only if another member of the body immediately seconds the motion.

Once the chair states the motion, it becomes the property of the assembly and the mover cannot modify it or withdraw it without the assembly's consent.

=== Previous notice ===
Previous notice is an announcement that a motion will be introduced at a future meeting of a deliberative assembly. Previous notice can be given in one of two ways. A member either announces it at a meeting of the assembly, in which case the secretary is to record it in the minutes, or notifies the secretary outside of the meeting. In either case, the secretary is to include in the call of the next meeting the motion's text, often accompanied by the name of the person who intends to move it. Certain motions – specifically, the motions to adopt or amend special rules of order, rescind, repeal or annul or amend something previously adopted, amend standing rules in a convention, discharge a committee, and postpone an event or action previously scheduled – are more difficult to pass if previous notice has not been given. Often, a majority of the entire membership or a two-thirds vote is required if previous notice has not been given. This rule is intended to protect the rights of absent members. Sometimes, when moving a motion of which notice has been given, a member, instead of reading aloud the entire text, will simply say "I move the motion which stands in my name".

== Classification of motions ==
There are different types of motions. Robert's Rules of Order Newly Revised (RONR) divides motions into five classes:

1. Main motions, those that bring business before the assembly when no other motion is pending. This is the most common type of motion.
2. Subsidiary motions, which affect the main motion being considered.
3. Privileged motions, which are urgent matters that must be dealt with immediately, even if they interrupt pending business.
4. Incidental motions, which relate in different ways to the business at hand.
5. Motions that bring a matter again before the assembly.

Classes 2, 3 and 4 are collectively referred to as "secondary motions".

The Standard Code of Parliamentary Procedure treats the fifth class as a type of main motion, under the title "Restorative Main Motions".

Mason's Manual of Legislative Procedure has a similar classification of motions.

The United States Senate and House of Representatives have their own specialized motions as provided in the Standing Rules of the United States Senate and the procedures of the United States House of Representatives, respectively.

Parliaments also have their own specialized motions.

In the Parliament of India there are broadly three categories of motion:

1. Substantive Motion
2. Substitute Motion
3. Subsidiary Motion, further classified into ancillary motion, superseding motion and amendment.

=== Main motion ===
Main motion (RONR)
- Class: Main motion
- Requires second?: Yes
- Debatable?: Yes
- May be reconsidered?: Yes
- Amendable?: Yes
- Vote required: Majority

A main motion is a motion that brings business before the assembly. Main motions are made while no other motion is pending. Any of the subsidiary, incidental and privileged motions may be made while the main motion is pending, and in many cases these motions, if passed, will affect the assembly's consideration of the main motion.

When greater formality is desired, the main motion may be made in the form of a resolution, which is always submitted in writing. A preamble containing several paragraphs explaining background information or justification for the proposed action is often included, but is not required.

Normally, this is a motion that introduces a substantive question as a new subject, in which case it is also called an original main motion. Otherwise, it is an incidental main motion, examples of which are the motions to adopt recommendations of a committee, to ratify action previously taken without a quorum, to rescind an action previously taken, or to adjourn or recess while no main motion is pending. Unlike original main motions, incidental main motions cannot have an objection to the consideration of the question applied to them.

=== Subsidiary motion ===
A subsidiary motion is a type of motion by which a deliberative assembly deals directly with a main motion prior to (or instead of) voting on the main motion itself. Each subsidiary motion ranks higher than the main motion and lower than the privileged motions, and also yields to applicable incidental motions. Some of the subsidiary motions may also be applied to certain other subsidiary motions, incidental motions and privileged motions.

Robert's Rules of Order Newly Revised recognizes seven subsidiary motions. Ranked lowest to highest in order of precedence, they are the motions to:

1. Postpone indefinitely—to end consideration of the main motion for the balance of that session, without a direct vote on the main motion.
2. Amend—to change the main motion. (May also be applied to certain other motions).
3. Commit or Refer—to send the main motion and any pending subsidiary motions to a committee for consideration.
4. Postpone to a certain time (or Postpone Definitely, or Postpone) -- to delay consideration of the main motion and any pending subsidiary motions.
5. Limit or extend limits of debate—to change limitations on number or length of speeches from those previously adopted.
6. Previous Question—to close debate, preclude any further amendments and vote immediately. (May apply to any motion or pending series of motions.)
7. Lay on the Table—to suspend consideration of the main motion and any pending subsidiary motions to allow for immediate consideration of more urgent business.

The Standard Code of Parliamentary Procedure differs as follows:

- The motion to Postpone Indefinitely is omitted. The motion to Table (or Postpone Temporarily) is used instead.
- The motion for the Previous Question is instead called the motion to Close Debate.

=== Privileged motion ===
A privileged motion is a motion that is granted precedence over ordinary business because it concerns matters of great importance or urgency. Such motions are not debatable, although in case of questions of privilege, the chair may feel the need to elicit relevant facts from members.

According to Robert's Rules of Order Newly Revised, the privileged motions are, in order of precedence:

1. Fix the time to which to adjourn, if another question is pending.
2. Adjourn, but not if qualified or if adjournment would dissolve the assembly.
3. Take a recess, if another question is pending.
4. Raise a question of privilege
5. Call for orders of the day

The Standard Code of Parliamentary Procedure omits Fix the time to which to adjourn, instead providing that the motion to adjourn may be amended with regard to the time to which to adjourn. This book also omits Call for orders of the day, on the grounds that any member may raise a point of order if the scheduled order of business is not being followed.

=== Incidental motion ===
An incidental motion is a motion that relates in varying ways to the main motion and other parliamentary motions.

Robert's Rules of Order Newly Revised lists the following incidental motions: appeal the decision of the chair, consideration by paragraph or seriatim, division of a question, division of the assembly, motions relating to nominations, motions relating to methods of voting and the polls, objection to the consideration of a question, point of order, request to be excused from a duty, suspend the rules, and the requests and inquiries (parliamentary inquiry, request for information, request for permission to withdraw or modify a motion, request to read papers, and request for any other privilege). Most incidental motions are undebatable.

Unlike the privileged and subsidiary motions, incidental motions have no order of precedence among themselves. They take precedence over any pending question out of which they arise. Some incidental motions are only legitimately incidental at certain times or under certain conditions. For instance, the objection to the consideration of a question can only be raised before there has been any debate.

=== Motions that bring a question again before the assembly ===
Motions that bring a question again before the assembly are types of motions that are used to consider again a question that was previously disposed of.

Robert's Rules of Order Newly Revised groups four motions under the classification name of "Motions that bring a question again before the assembly", because by their adoption or by their introduction, they serve the function described by the name of the class: Take from the table, Rescind or amend something previously adopted, Discharge a committee, and Reconsider. Except for the motion to Reconsider, these motions are main motions and can only be made when no business is pending.

The Standard Code of Parliamentary Procedure classifies five "bring back" motions under the classification of main motions but lists them under the title of "Restorative Main Motions": Amend a previous action, Ratify, Reconsider, Rescind, and Resume Consideration. This book treats the motion to rescind and the motion to amend something previously adopted as two distinct motion forms under the "Restorative Main Motions" title. Also, the motion to discharge a committee is not used in this book because it allows a motion previously referred to committee to be withdrawn from the committee by the assembly. The motion to ratify is also included in this group.

Demeter's Manual of Parliamentary Law and Procedure uses the term, "restoratory", for a group of six motions that restored or brought a question back before the assembly: Expunge, Ratify, Rescind, Reconsider, Reconsider and Enter, and Take from the table. These "restoratory" motions are quasi-main motions that restore the status quo of a question; that is, they bring a question back to its original status—as it was prior to the last vote on it.

== Rules on use ==
Generally only one motion can be considered at a time. There is a precedence, or ranking of the motions, when multiple motions are made. Each type of motion exists for a specific purpose. However, motions have been used beyond their stated purpose. Motions should not be made for dilatory or improper uses.

=== Strategic use of motions ===
Motions can accomplish results beyond their stated and obvious purpose. An example in Robert's Rules of Order is using the motion to postpone indefinitely in order to enable members who have exhausted their right of debate on the main question an opportunity to speak further and to test the strength of opposition to the question, since straw polls are not in order. Another example of strategic use of motions is moving to reconsider in order to "clinch" a decision on the primary motion and prevent its reconsideration later, since a failed motion to reconsider cannot be reconsidered without unanimous consent. Since it is not possible to amend an amendment to an amendment, a member desiring to prevent amendments to his proposed language can do so by including it in a secondary amendment.

Another parliamentary maneuver, which has been used in the United States Senate, is the so-called "nuclear option" in which a majority sidesteps the two-thirds vote requirement to suspend the rules by raising a point of order in favor of their favored interpretation of the rules, followed by an appeal in which the interpretation is then imposed by a majority vote.

=== Dilatory tactics and motions ===
Dilatory tactics or motions are those tactics used to delay or obstruct business, annoy the deliberative assembly, or, in legislative procedure, to delay consideration of a subject. Unlike using motions for strategic purposes, using them for dilatory purposes is not allowed. Reasonableness is often used as a criterion in deciding whether a motion is dilatory. Some types of motions are suitable only for specific circumstances, and their use is otherwise absurd and dilatory.

For instance, a motion to refer (commit) a resolution to a committee is dilatory if its object would be defeated by the delay in taking action. A motion to appeal the ruling of the chair is dilatory if there cannot possibly be two reasonable opinions about the ruling. Likewise, a motion for a division of the assembly is dilatory if the results of the voice vote are already clear to any reasonable person. The repetitive use of privileged motions can also be dilatory, such as repeatedly moving to adjourn when it has been voted down and nothing indicates that the assembly wants to end the meeting.

A presiding officer has a duty to protect the assembly from the abuse of parliamentary processes for dilatory purposes. The chair can rule the motions out of order or refuse to recognize the member, but the maker of the motion should be given the benefit of the doubt.

In legislative bodies, dilatory motions can take the form of demanding quorum calls and votes at every opportunity. Another dilatory tactic is for members to not answer when their name is called during the quorum roll call. The problem of dilatory tactics in such bodies dates back to the beginnings of parliamentary procedure in England and the United States. Jefferson's Manual, for instance, only requires the Speaker to direct a bill to be read upon the desire of any member "if the request is really for information and not for delay." In the US Senate, there are no formal rules against dilatory tactics except under cloture. Between 1831 and 1900, dilatory votes to adjourn composed more than 10 percent of all Senate votes, and successfully delayed recognition of Louisiana's Reconstruction government until 1868. According to Sarah Binder, in the 46th United States Congress, motions to adjourn consumed 23 percent of all floor votes. Speaker Thomas Brackett Reed famously took countermeasures against dilatory tactics, such as ruling dilatory motions out of order, and was sustained by the house. Some legislatures impose quotas on dilatory motions. For instance, the Nova Scotia House of Assembly imposes a maximum of one motion to hoist, one motion to refer to a committee, and one reasoned amendment per reading. The Rules of the U.S. Congress as revised in 1911 declare that no dilatory motion shall be entertained by the Speaker.

The term "dilatory motion" does not always refer to an ill-intentioned motion. In Canada, "dilatory" motions refer to those "designed to dispose of the original question before the House either for the time being or permanently," and includes, for instance, motions to proceed to the orders of the day; postpone definitely; adjourn; and so on. Jeremy Bentham held that such types of dilatory motions are useful, stating, "Precipitation may arise from two causes: from ignorance, when a judgment is formed without the collection of all the information required—from passion, when there is not the necessary calm for considering the question in all its aspects."

== Renewal of motions ==
Renewal of a motion is the act of bringing up again a motion that has already been disposed of by the deliberative assembly. Generally, the assembly cannot be asked to decide the same question, or substantially the same question, as one it has already decided upon in the same session.

The underlying principle behind the non-renewal of a motion dates back to at least April 2, 1607, when the House of Commons adopted a rule "That a question being once made, and carried in the affirmative or negative, cannot be questioned again, but must stand as a judgement of the House". Over the past 400 years, various rules have evolved by precedent to allow and manage renewal of motions under specific circumstances.

Renewal of motions is closely tied to the parliamentary concept of "session". Sessions in ordinary societies usually consist of one meeting, but legislative sessions can continue for months or years. A motion that has been rejected (voted down) in one session, cannot be easily brought up again in that session, but can be renewed in following sessions as a new motion. Robert's Rules of Order Newly Revised provides exceptions to non-renewal through the motions to Reconsider, Rescind, or Amend Something Previously Adopted.

In the British House of Commons, a motion or an amendment which is the same, in substance, as a question which has been decided during a session may not be renewed again in that same session. Such substantive motions can be renewed in succeeding sessions as new motions. Reversals of earlier decisions can be done by Repeal of a Standing Order, Annulment, or Rescission. The repeal of a standing order is normally made as part of an order creating a new standard order. An annulment is used to declare proceedings to be null and void because of some form of irregularity in procedure. Renewals in the form of a rescission of a resolution made in earlier sessions is not prohibited by the practice of the House of Commons, but is seldom done. Technically it is regarded as a new question: the form being to read the previous resolution of the House and to move that it be rescinded. This power of rescission has been used sparingly and then only in the case of substantive motions. The reasons why open rescission is so rare is that the House instinctively realizes that parliamentary government requires the majority to abide by a decision regularly come to, however unexpected, and that it is unfair to resort to methods, whether direct or indirect, to reverse such a decision. Essentially this is a safeguard for the rights of the minority.

== National Legislatures ==
=== Ireland ===
In both Dáil Éireann and Seanad Éireann members may table a motion. There are three types of motion:

- Government motions: often used to fulfil legislative requirements such as approving regulations or for budget estimates, terms of agreements, or partnerships that require Dáil approval. Government motions are frequently taken without debate and may be passed speedily.
- Committee motions: frequently cover committee reports such as pre-legislative scrutiny or reports produced by committees where areas of government policy have been scrutinised.
- Private members' motions: can be proposed by any member of the respective houses and often address government policy or pressing national or international issues.

Dáil motions are processed and managed by the Journal Office which ensures all motions are circulated to members and made available on the Dáil business website. Seanad motions are submitted to the Seanad Office.

Motions must be received in writing by the relevant Clerk four days before they are scheduled for debate. Amendments must be received in writing two days before the debate.

=== The Netherlands ===
In both the Senate and House of Representatives of the Netherlands, members may present motions, often to urge a member of the Cabinet to change their policy or budget, or as a motion of no confidence. Such motions are usually presented near the end of a plenary or commission debate. In the Senate, a motion must be supported by at least 5 senators, though this is not required in the House. House motions are more common than Senate motions.

In the House, motions are voted on during the weekly voting period of the plenary debate, usually after the hour of question time on Tuesday. Before the voting period starts, the concerned member of the Cabinet may utter their judgement on every submitted motion, according to the table below

| Judgement | Meaning |
|---|---|
| Take on | The Cabinet member agrees with the motion and takes it on in their policy, provided no members of the House urge for a vote. |
| Discouraged | The Cabinet member has objections to the motion and advises the House against adopting it. |
| Unacceptable | The Cabinet member has fundamental objections to a motion (such as consequences for keeping their position). |
| Hold* | The Cabinet member advises the Member to hold the motion, for instance to provide time for extra information to come out. |
| House judgement | The Cabinet member has no strong opinions and will agree with and take on the judgement of the House. |

*If the Member who presented the motion does not want to hold, the Cabinet member has to give another judgement to the motion.

Motions are, like proposed laws, usually voted on by party, though any member may request a roll call vote. If a motion is accepted, the Cabinet is not required to take it on, though they usually do. Motions are very common in both Houses, as the House of Representatives alone submits and votes on several thousands of motion a year.

=== United Kingdom ===
In both Houses of the Parliament of the United Kingdom, motions can be classified in two separate categories: motions of which notice does not have to be given and motions of which notice must be given.

Motions belonging to the first category are mostly ones which deal with procedural points, such as motions to close debate, to invoke the previous question, to adjourn consideration of a matter before the House, or to sit in private.

Motions belonging to the first category constitute the large majority of motions considered by the House. If a Member intends to move one, he must first notify the Chair of the motion's text. Thereafter, if the Government (which is in charge of parliamentary business) decides to allow debate on that motion to be held, and to set a day on which such debate will be held, the motion's text will appear on that day's Order Paper, next to the name of the Member who intends to move it. At the beginning of the sitting, the Presiding Officer shall call on the Member whose name is the first to appear on the Order Paper to move his or her motion. This is often done by saying "I beg to move", followed by the entire text of the motion, or more simply by saying "I beg to move the motion which stands in my name on the Order Paper". After debate on that motion has ended (and the motion itself has either been put up to a vote or withdrawn), the Presiding Officer shall call upon the Member whose name is the second to appear on the Order Paper, and the process is repeated until either all motions on the Order Paper have been debated or the sitting has been adjourned.

Motions which have not yet been granted by the Government a day on which to be debated are called early day motions.

Similar rules apply in most Commonwealth Parliaments.

== See also ==
- Ballot measure
- Bill (law)
- List of motions
- Petition
- Resolution (law)
- Yes–no question
