= The Standard Code of Parliamentary Procedure =

Book by American Institute of Parliamentarians

Standard Code of Parliamentary Procedure
- Cover of 2012 edition
- Author: American Institute of Parliamentarians, Alice Sturgis
- Original title: Sturgis' Standard Code of Parliamentary Procedure
- Subject: Parliamentary Procedure
- Publisher: AIP
- Publication date: Original Edition: 1950; Current Edition: 2023
- Pages: 444
- ISBN: 978-1958850022
- Dewey Decimal: 060.42
- Preceded by: 2012 edition

The Standard Code of Parliamentary Procedure (formerly the Sturgis Standard Code of Parliamentary Procedure by Alice Sturgis) is a book of rules of order. It is the second most popular parliamentary authority in the United States after Robert's Rules of Order. It was first published in 1950. Following the death of the original author in 1975, the third (1988) and fourth (2001) editions of this work were revised by a committee of the American Institute of Parliamentarians. In April 2012, a new book, entitled American Institute of Parliamentarians Standard Code of Parliamentary Procedure (AIPSC) was released, followed by a second edition in 2023.

The Standard Code (TSC, specifically the 2001 edition and prior) simplify formal procedure by omitting several complex motions and confusing terminology found in Robert's Rules of Order (RONR). The cover quote of the 2001 edition states, "Anyone who has trouble with Robert's Rules of Order will welcome the simplicity of this streamlined guide to parliamentary procedure." To assist users, the TSC included a full chapter detailing the differences between the two works and offering guidance for users attending meetings governed by Robert's Rules. However, the newer edition, American Institute of Parliamentarians Standard Code of Parliamentary Procedure (AIPSC, released in 2012 and 2023), omits this comparative chapter and any direct mention of Robert's Rules, focusing instead on presenting its rules as an independent standard.

== Vs. Robert's Rules of Order ==
Differences between RONR and TSC
	Robert's Rules of Order	The Standard Code
Motions in RONR but not in TSC	Call for the orders of the day	Use informal request or point of order
Motions in RONR but not in TSC	Fix the time to which to adjourn	Instead amend the privileged motion to adjourn
Motions in RONR but not in TSC	Objection to the consideration of a question	Accomplished by different motions depending on circumstances
Motions in RONR but not in TSC	Postpone indefinitely	Use form of table (requiring a two-thirds vote)
Motions with different names	Previous question	Close debate and vote immediately (or other variations)
Concepts in RONR but not TSC	Committee of the whole and quasi-committee of the whole	Use informal consideration
Terminology differences	"Adjourned meeting" resumption of a meeting following an adjournment	"Continued meeting"
Other differences	Major differences in the treatment of the motions to reconsider and table	
