= Debate (parliamentary procedure) =

Discussion on the merits of a pending question

Debate in parliamentary procedure refers to discussion on the merits of a pending question; that is, whether it should or should not be agreed to. It is also commonly referred to as "discussion".

== Purpose ==
When a motion has been made and is before the assembly, the process of debate could help the assembly determine whether to take action on the proposal. Robert's Rules of Order Newly Revised (RONR) says, "Debate, rightly understood, is an essential element in the making of rational decisions of consequence by intelligent people." One of the distinguishing characteristics of a deliberative assembly is that it is "a group of people, having or assuming freedom to act in concert, meeting to determine, in full and free discussion, courses of action to be taken in the name of the entire group."

== Limits of debate ==
=== Speech and time limits ===
Under the rules in Robert's Rules of Order Newly Revised, the right of members to participate in debate is limited to two ten-minute speeches per day on a question. Riddick's Rules of Procedure also specifies a default limit of ten minutes. The United States Senate has a limit of two speeches and no time limit for the speeches. In the United States House of Representatives, debate on most bills is limited to 40 minutes. In state legislative bodies, Mason's Manual of Legislative Procedure limits debate to one speech for each question.

Using Robert's Rules of Order Newly Revised, a speaker cannot transfer the time to another member. Also, unlike the practice in Congress, a member of an assembly in an ordinary society cannot yield the floor to let another member speak on his or her time.

=== Modification of limits ===
The group could modify the limits of debate to suit its needs. Modification of the speech and time limits could be done for a particular motion, a group of motions, or for the meeting through a motion to limit or extend the limits of debate. The assembly could also remove the limit on the number of speeches by using Informal consideration or by going into a committee of the whole or quasi committee of the whole. If the assembly wants the change of limits to be effective for all its meetings and not just for the current meeting, it could adopt a special rule of order changing the limits on debate.

=== On the merits, not the member ===
Debate on any question should be limited to the merits of the question. Debate should not be about other members and especially should not involve any personal attacks. To keep the debate from becoming personal, members should address the chair instead of each other.

=== No interruption of speaker ===
A member speaking in debate should not be interrupted unless a rule is being broken or the urgency of the situation justifies the interruption (correcting a speaker of the facts spoken in debate does not justify an interruption). An example of an appropriate situation to interrupt a speaker is if the speaker is starting to make a personal attack on another member.

=== Not all motions are debatable ===
All main motions are debatable. Other motions may or may not be debatable. The debatability of motions depends on the purpose of the motion. For example, the purpose of the motion to limit debate would be defeated if this motion itself could be debated; therefore, the motion to limit debate is not debatable.

=== Chairman should not debate ===
Except in committees and small boards, the chairman (or whatever title the presiding officer is called) should not speak in debate to maintain the impartiality required of this position. This also means that the chairman should not interrupt a speaker so long as that person is following the rules of the group. In addition, Robert's Rules of Order Newly Revised states that "under legitimate parliamentary procedure, there is no such thing as 'gaveling through' a measure." In other words, the chairman cannot move so quickly through the proceedings so as to disregard the rights of members to speak on it.

== Speaking order ==
The member who made the motion is entitled to speak first in debate. Then members are called on the order in which they are recognized by the chair, although members who have not spoken yet get preference over those who have. If possible, the chair alternates between someone in favor and someone against the motion.

== Motion to limit or extend limits of debate ==
Limit or extend limits of debate (RONR)
- Class: Subsidiary motion
- In order when another has the floor?: No
- Requires second?: Yes
- Debatable?: No
- May be reconsidered?: Yes; but if vote was affirmative, only unexecuted part of order. A negative vote on this motion can be reconsidered only until such time as progress in business or debate has made it essentially a new question
- Amendable?: Yes
- Vote required: Two-thirds

The motion to limit or extend limits of debate is used to modify how much debate is allowed.

=== Robert's Rules of Order Newly Revised (RONR) ===
Unless the organization's rules say otherwise, each member of a deliberative assembly is allowed to make two ten-minute speeches on each debatable motion, with a requirement that a member wait for other members who have not spoken on the question to speak before making his second speech. The motion to limit or extend limits of debate can decrease or increase the allowed number of speeches or length of speeches or it can decrease or increase the total amount of time for debate.

=== The Standard Code of Parliamentary Procedure (TSC) ===
Limit or extend debate (TSC)
- Class: Subsidiary motion
- In order when another has the floor?: No
- Requires second?: Yes
- Debatable?: Yes
- May be reconsidered?: No
- Amendable?: Yes
- Vote required: Majority

The Standard Code of Parliamentary Procedure implements this concept as the motion to extend or limit debate. A variety of limits may be imposed on the debate, including:

- Limiting the number of minutes allotted to each member. As TSC normally allows for speeches of unlimited length, this motion can impose time limits.
- Limiting the number of minutes allotted to the entire debate.
- The number of speeches each member may make.
- The number of speeches that may be made both for and against the motion, regardless of who makes them.

Alternatively, the motion can also modify or remove limits already imposed. For example, if each speaker is given three minutes, and a speaker reaches their maximum, they may use this motion to request an additional 30 seconds to finish their remarks.

Because this motion by definition limits or changes the limits of the freedom of the body, it requires a vote of two-thirds to pass.

TSC does not normally limit the length of speeches as RONR does, stating, "Parliamentary law fixes no limit on the length of speeches during debate...Debate can ordinarily be kept within reasonable time limits by the presiding officer's insistence that all discussion be confined strictly to the subject." Also, TSC allows the motion to limit or extend debate to be debated, but only on the merits of the limitations. As with all subsidiary motions, TSC does not allow this motion to be reconsidered.

== Closing debate ==
A member can make a motion to close debate immediately. The assembly of an ordinary society could decide to adopt such a motion by a two-thirds vote or by unanimous consent.

Debate is automatically closed when no one else wants to speak on the motion.

== See also ==
- Argument
- Conversation
- Discourse
- Group decision-making
