= Recognition (parliamentary procedure) =

In United States parliamentary procedure, recognition, or assignment of the floor, is the exclusive right to be heard at that time by a member of a deliberative assembly. With a few exceptions, a member must be recognized by the chairperson before engaging in debate or making a motion.

== Rules ==
The general rule is that the first member to rise and address the chair after another member has yielded the floor (by sitting down) is entitled to the floor.

Exceptions to this general rule include the following:

- The maker of a motion is entitled to speak first in debate on it.
- If a motion is made to implement a recommendation in a committee report, the member who presented the report to the assembly is entitled to preference in recognition.
- If a motion is taken from the table, the member who moved to take it from the table is entitled to preference in recognition.
- If a motion is reconsidered, the member who made the motion to reconsider is entitled to preference in recognition.
- If a member has already spoken on the pending motion, he may not speak again on it on the same day as long as any other member who has not spoken on the motion claims the floor.
- If the chair knows that persons seeking the floor have opposite opinions on the pending motion, the chair is to let the floor alternate between the opposing sides. This is sometimes accomplished by designating different microphones for those favoring and opposing a measure or having members hold up cards indicating their position.
- If the floor has been assigned but the member has not yet begun to speak, another member may interrupt to give previous notice of another motion.

If the chair made a mistake in assigning the floor, a point of order may be raised.

Once a member has the floor, that member should not be interrupted unless a rule is being broken or the urgency of the situation justifies the interruption (such as a member raising a point of order).

== See also ==
- Floor (legislative)
