= Deliberative assembly =

Organization that uses parliamentary procedure to make decisions

A deliberative assembly is a group of individuals who deliberate and use parliamentary procedure to make decisions.

== Etymology ==
In a speech to the electorate at Bristol in 1774, Edmund Burke described the British Parliament as a "deliberative assembly", and the expression became the basic term for a body of persons meeting to discuss and determine common action. Merriam-Webster's definition excludes legislatures.

== Characteristics ==
Robert's Rules of Order Newly Revised by Henry Martyn Robert describes the following characteristics of a deliberative assembly:

- A group of people meets to discuss and make decisions on behalf of the entire membership.
- They meet in a single room or area, or under equivalent conditions of simultaneous oral communication.
- Each member is free to act according to their judgement.
- Each member has an equal vote.
- The members at the meeting act for the entire group, even if there are members absent.
- A member's dissent on a particular issue constitutes neither a withdrawal from the group, nor a termination of membership.

== Types ==
Robert's Rules of Order Newly Revised identifies several types of deliberative assemblies.

=== Mass meeting ===
A mass meeting is a meeting open to all individuals in a sector of the population who are interested in deliberating about a subject proposed by the meeting's sponsors. Examples include meetings to discuss common political concerns or community interests, or meetings to form a new society.

=== Local assembly of an organized society ===
A local assembly of an organized society is a membership meeting of a local chapter or branch of a membership organization. Examples include local chapter meetings of organizations like the Sierra Club.

=== Convention ===
A convention is a meeting of delegates who represent constituent units of a population. Conventions are not permanently established bodies, and delegates are normally elected for only one term. A convention may be held by an organized society, where each local assembly is represented by a delegate.

=== Legislative body ===
A legislative body is a legally established public lawmaking body that consists of representatives chosen by the electorate. Examples include parliaments, state legislatures, and city councils.

=== Board ===
A board is an administrative, managerial, or quasi-judicial body. A board derives its power from an outside authority that defines the scope of its operations. Examples include an organized society's or company's board of directors and government agency boards like a board of education.

=== Committee ===
A committee is a body of persons subordinate to a deliberative assembly. Robert's Rules of Order Newly Revised does not consider a committee itself to be a deliberative assembly.

== Rights of members ==
A member of a deliberative assembly has the right to attend meetings and make and second motions, speak in the debate, and vote. Organizations may have different classes of members (such as regular members, active members, associate members, and honorary members), but the rights of each class of membership must be defined (such as whether a "member" in a class has the right to vote). There may also be ex officio members or persons who are members under some other office or position they hold. Ex officio members have the same rights as other members.

== See also ==
- Citizens' assembly
- Committee
- Deliberation
- Deliberative democracy
- Direct democracy
- Legislative assembly
- Meeting (parliamentary procedure)
- Voting methods in deliberative assemblies
