= Reconsideration of a motion =

Motion in parliamentary procedure

In parliamentary procedure, reconsideration of a motion (or reconsideration of a question) may be done on a matter previously decided. The motion to "reconsider" is used for this purpose. This motion originated in the United States and is generally not used in parliaments. A special form of this motion is reconsider and enter on the minutes.

== Explanation and use ==
=== Robert's Rules of Order Newly Revised ===
Reconsider (RONR)
- Class: Motion that brings a question again before the assembly
- In order when another has the floor?: When another has been assigned the floor, but not after he has begun to speak
- Requires second?: Yes
- Debatable?: If motion to be reconsidered is debatable, in which case debate can go into that question
- May be reconsidered?: No
- Amendable?: No
- Vote required: Majority

A matter that was voted on could be brought back again through the motion to reconsider. Under Robert's Rules of Order Newly Revised (RONR), this motion must be made within a limited time after the action on the original motion: either on the same day or in the case of a multi-day session (such as a convention), on the next day within the session in which business is conducted.

Until the motion to reconsider is disposed of or lapses, the effect of the original vote is suspended, and no action may be taken to implement it. This is in contrast to the motion to rescind, which may be made at any later meeting, but until passed, has no effect on the original decision.

The motion to reconsider may be made only by a member who voted on the prevailing side in the original vote (such as someone who voted "yes" if the motion had passed or voted "no" if the motion was defeated). If another member disputes an assertion by the maker of the motion to reconsider that he voted on the prevailing side, the member moving to reconsider is to be believed unless the record of a roll call vote says otherwise.

The motion to reconsider is debatable to the extent that the motion being reconsidered is debatable.

The making of the motion to reconsider takes precedence over all other motions and yields to nothing. It is not, however, considered at the time it is made if other business is pending, and the timing of its consideration depends on the ranking of the motion that led to the vote to be reconsidered. If it could not be considered at the time, a member could call up the motion to reconsider when it is appropriate to do so.

=== Standard Code of Parliamentary Procedure ===
The Standard Code of Parliamentary Procedure (TSC) treats the motion to reconsider differently in the following ways. This motion could be made by any member (not just one who voted on the prevailing side). It is debatable only as to the reasons for reconsideration, and the original motion is opened for debate only if the motion for reconsideration passes. Only votes on main motions may be reconsidered (not secondary motions). If made while other business is pending, the motion to reconsider is taken up as soon as the other business is disposed of (it does not wait for someone to call up the motion).

=== Legislative use ===
In American legislative bodies, there is a strong tradition of affirming the right to reconsider with almost no restrictions. As with the case in other assemblies, reconsideration is not allowed if another motion would accomplish the result more directly (e.g. take from the table instead of reconsidering the motion to lay on the table). It is also not possible to reconsider if vested rights have been acquired because of the action, or the subject is otherwise beyond the control or out of reach of the body taking the original action.

Mason's Manual of Legislative Procedure states that there are no time limits with the motion to reconsider other than the practical limits of the item being within the reach of the assembly.

The rules in these bodies may provide that any member can make the motion to reconsider, not just someone who voted on the prevailing side (such as California Senate Rule No. 43 and New York Senate Rule No. VI).

Mason's Manual permits a member to give notice of the motion to reconsider.

In the U.S. Congress, there are specific limits to the motion to reconsider. In addition, a custom that is followed in this body is that following a vote, the speaker or speaker pro tempore (in the US House of Representatives) or president or acting president pro tempore (in the US Senate) typically announces that, "without objection, the motion to reconsider is laid upon the table." Although no motion to reconsider (or to table) has actually been made, the making of this statement (unless there is objection) precludes the making of a future motion for reconsideration and makes the vote final.

== Reconsider and enter on the minutes ==
The motion to reconsider and enter on the minutes is a special form of the motion to reconsider that automatically halts a passed motion from taking effect until it is called up at another meeting, which cannot be held on the same day. Its purpose is to delay a temporary majority from taking action on a measure until there is time to notify absent members.

This motion is needed in large societies with frequent meetings and small quorums. For example, at a long meeting, many members may have left, leaving a quorum consisting mostly of a group determined to take certain action. In this case, this motion prevents the vote on that action from becoming final.

This motion cannot be applied to motions whose object would be defeated by the delay.

Demeter's Manual notes, "If the motion to reconsider and enter a question is not called up before adjournment of the next meeting, the objectionable act then goes into effect upon adjournment. To reconsider and enter is out of order when its purpose is obviously dilatory." It is allowed to withdraw the motion to reconsider and enter before the end of the meeting in which it is made.

The Standard Code of Parliamentary Procedure does not have this motion.

== See also ==
- Repeal#Parliamentary procedure
- Rethinking
