= Amend (motion) =

Motion in parliamentary procedure

In parliamentary procedure, the motion to amend is used to modify another motion. An amendment could itself be amended. A related procedure is filling blanks in a motion.

== Explanation and use ==
Amend (RONR)
- Class: Subsidiary motion
- In order when another has the floor?: No
- Requires second?: Yes
- Debatable?: Yes, if motion to be amended is debatable
- May be reconsidered?: Yes
- Amendable?: Yes, if first-order
- Vote required: Majority

Using Robert's Rules of Order Newly Revised (RONR), all main motions can be amended, by so called "first-order" amendments. A first-order amendment can be amended, by "second-order" amendments. However, the limit is that a second-order amendment may not be amended, because it would be too complicated.

Secondary motions that, by their nature, include a variable element, also may be amended. For example, the motion to postpone may be amended as to the length of the postponement; the motion to limit or extend limits of debate may be amended as to the number or length of speeches or the total time to be consumed; and the motion to commit or refer may be amended as to the details of the committee or the time within which the committee must report.

=== Forms and uses of the motion ===
The motion to amend takes three basic forms:

- Inserting or adding words or paragraphs.
- Striking out words or paragraphs.
- Striking out words and inserting or adding others, or substituting an entire paragraph or complete resolution for another.

A substitute amendment is an amendment that would replace existing language of a proposal or another amendment with its own.

An amendment can be used to water down a motion into a form that is more likely to be accepted or to convert it into a form that is more likely to be rejected.

=== Procedure ===
A proposed amendment is treated like many other motions in that it could be debated and voted on. This could be done even in the case of a friendly amendment. An amendment could pass with a majority vote, regardless of the vote required to pass the main motion. After passing or rejecting an amendment, the main motion would still need to be voted on.

== Filling blanks ==
A related procedure that changes the wording in a motion is the device of filling blanks. A blank could be created by adopting a motion to create a blank and then members could make suggestions to fill in that blank. This procedure is useful because it allows an unlimited number of suggestions to be voted on as opposed to the limit of allowing only first-order and second-order amendments (i.e. only an amendment to a motion and an amendment to the amendment are allowed). An example are nominations—they are, in effect, proposals to fill in the blank in the motion "that ________ be elected."

== See also ==
- Amendment
- Friendly amendment
- Request for permission to withdraw or modify a motion
- Second-degree amendment
- Shell bill
- Substitute amendment
