= Second (parliamentary procedure) =

Secondary interest in a deliberative motion

In deliberative bodies, a second to a proposed motion is an indication that there is at least one person besides the mover that is interested in seeing the motion come before the meeting. It does not necessarily indicate that the seconder favors the motion.

== Purpose ==
The purpose of requiring a second is to prevent time being wasted by the assembly's having to dispose of a motion that only one person wants to see introduced. Hearing a second to a motion is guidance to the chair that they should state the question on the motion, thereby placing it before the assembly. It does not necessarily indicate that the seconder favors the motion.

== Procedure ==
The seconder may state "I second the motion" or "second" without first being recognized by the chair. They may remain seated but in larger assemblies, except in those where nonmembers may be seated in the hall, the seconder should stand. After hearing a second, the chair then states the question and the motion is placed before the assembly for discussion.

=== When no second is made ===
After a motion is proposed, if the motion requires a second and none is immediately offered, the chair of the body will usually ask, "Is there a second?" If no second is obtained within a few moments of proposing the motion, then the motion is not considered by the assembly, and is treated as though it was never offered. Such a motion may be introduced again at any later time.

If a motion which requires a second does not receive one, but is discussed or voted on anyway, it is too late to object to the motion on the grounds that a second was not offered. This is because the purpose of the second has been fulfilled: the assembly is obviously willing to consider the motion.

A point of order that a motion is not in order for lack of a second can only be made before any discussion or vote has taken place on the motion.

=== When a second is not necessary ===
- in a small board or a committee.
- for motions made by direction of a board or appointed committee.
- once debate has begun on a motion.
- for certain procedural motions.

=== Withdrawal of a second ===
A second may be withdrawn if the motion is amended by the maker of the motion before it has been stated by the chair. Demeter's Manual states, "The seconder can also withdraw his second after the Chair has stated the question and before it is voted on, if the body permits it either by silent consent, or by majority vote if put to a formal vote."

== Parliamentary authorities that discourage seconds ==
- Ray Keesey states, "Motions need not be seconded. The requirement of a second is largely a waste of time. What member is so destitute of friends that he can't find one willing to second his motion? The traditional justification for requiring a second is that at least two members would support a motion to justify its consideration. ... There is nothing essentially wrong with the practice of seconding. It is simply unnecessary.
- Tilson's Manual advises against the use of seconds, stating, "It would seem that nothing could be more nearly useless and unnecessary than for some identified voice from the midst of the assembly to boom out, 'I second it'."
- Mason's Manual states that "Parliamentary practice in American governmental bodies does not require seconds to motions, and in Parliament itself, where the practice of seconding motions originated, they have not been required for more than a century."

== Legislative bodies ==
=== United States ===
While Jefferson's Manual, which is an authority still used in the US House of Representatives, requires a Second, the House has, by precedent and Standing orders, entirely dispensed with the use of Seconds.

=== Australia ===
==== Federal Parliament ====
Seconds are still required in the Australian House of Representatives for motions moved by private members. On the basis that a Minister is assumed to have the backing of the Government, Motions moved by a Minister and, in certain circumstances, the Chief Government Whip, do not require a seconder. Seconds are called for in some special cases, even when moved by a minister, for example condolence motions, when traditionally the Leader of the Opposition will second the motion. Seconds are not used in the Australian Senate however.

==== State Parliaments ====
Seconds are not required in either house of the Parliament of New South Wales nor in the unicameral Legislative Assembly of the Australian Capital Territory.

In the unicameral parliament of Queensland a seconder is not required in most cases. A seconder is required for any motion or amendment to an Address to the Governor, election of the Speaker or condolence.

==== Local Government ====
In contrast to the practice in the State Parliament, the Model Code of Meeting Practice for Local Government in New South Wales requires that motions be seconded.

In Queensland the Best Practice Standing Orders for Local Government requires a second for all motions. However, in contrast to NSW, these Standing Orders are not binding on Councils, which may modify them.

== Common Law ==
An early document attesting to the need for a second is Scobell's Memorials etc, which was referenced by Jefferson in his Manual. However the importance of a Second is not clear in Scobell's work, and in any event it has been progressively overturned by legislatures since the 19th Century.

It has been held judicially that the Common Law does not demand a Second, except when the "custom and practice" of the organisation requires it. Although a contrary opinion has also been stated.
