= Special rules of order =

Parliamentary procedure term

In parliamentary procedure, a special rule of order is a rule adopted by the organization that relates to procedure or to the duties of officers within meetings.

== Explanation and use ==
Special rules of order (with a few exceptions) supersede the rules in an adopted parliamentary authority such as Robert's Rules of Order. These rules continue in existence from one meeting to the next.

=== Robert's Rules of Order Newly Revised (RONR) ===
Special rules can be adopted by a two-thirds vote with previous notice or a majority of the entire membership of the group. In conventions, a mixture of standing and special rules that are adopted at the start of the convention are called "convention standing rule" in RONR. These, when adopted as a "package" generally require a two-thirds vote.

=== The Standard Code (TSC) ===
The Standard Code of Parliamentary Procedure (TSC), refer to these types of rules as "standing rules", and do not require a simple majority vote without previous notice. One of the most common types of these rules is the rule to set limits on the amount of time, or the number of times, a member may speak in debate or to prohibit some type of motion.

== Related concepts ==
- In RONR, standing rules are adopted rules that do not relate to procedure.
- Under TSC, special rules are rules adopted just for one situation and do not have continuing existence.

== See also ==
- Principles of parliamentary procedure
- Bourinot's Rules of Order
- Demeter's Manual of Parliamentary Law and Procedure
- Riddick's Rules of Procedure
- Suspension of the rules
