= History of parliamentary procedure =

The history of parliamentary procedure refers to the origins and evolution of parliamentary law used by deliberative assemblies.

== Origins ==
Demeter's Manual traces the origins of modern parliamentary law, by which is meant orderly deliberation and action by an assembly of persons or a body of citizens, to c. 750 BC in Greece. Their concept of self-government, with the right to deliberate in assembly and to speak and vote on public questions, is a crucial ancestor to modern conceptions of deliberative governance. The Greeks instituted the Athenian agora, equivalent to the American town meeting, consisting of the whole body of male citizens above eighteen years of age, which met forty times each year on the Acropolis. Any citizen could address the meeting from the Bema and vote on questions before the assembly.

Circa 450 BC, the Romans adopted the concept of self-government and expanded it with the institution of the Roman Forum, where Roman orators addressed the General Assembly from the Rostra and the people afterward voted on pending questions.

== Anglo-Saxon tribes ==
According to Robert's Rules of Order Newly Revised (RONR), one commonly held view is that "our own tradition of parliamentary process may be traced to ways of life in Anglo-Saxon tribes before their migration to the island of Britain starting in the fifth century A.D. Among these peoples on the continent of Europe, the tribe was the largest regularly existing political unit." Each of the early Anglo-Saxon kingdoms had its own witenagemot, which was a national assembly consisting of freemen who owned land. The structure of the Anglo-Saxon governmental machinery was left largely intact even after the Norman Conquest in 1066, with the Norman kings assembling a "Great Council" of court officials, barons, and prelates that was constitutionally a continuation of the witenagemot.

== Early parliament ==
In the 13th and early 14th centuries, the Great Council was converted into the English Parliament. The distinguishing feature of these early parliaments was that the barons were invited to not only express their opinions individually to the king, but to discuss with each other the business "of king and kingdom" rather than only "the king's business." The earliest parliament clearly identifiable as of this character was held in 1258. It was during the Thirteenth century that the rules of parliamentary law started taking form as a science. The clerk of the House of Commons began keeping the Journal of the House of Commons on his own initiative in 1547, which became a source of precedent in parliamentary procedure. Legislative Procedure: Parliamentary Practices and the Course of Business notes that "many usages were crystallized, so to speak, by the ruling of a Speaker or by some formal action of Parliament, such as a resolution or simple vote."

== Early United States ==
British parliamentary procedures were carried over to the American colonies and became the foundations of legislative procedure in the U.S. states. Jefferson's Manual, published in 1801, recognized indebtedness to John Hatsell's Precedents of Proceedings in the House of Commons. In the U.S. House of Representatives, parliamentary procedure was perfected into a system which was described in the U.S. House Rules and Manual thus:

They are perhaps the most finely adjusted, scientifically balanced, and highly technical rules of any parliamentary body in the world. Under them a majority may work its will at all times in the face of the most determined and vigorous opposition of a minority

The development of parliamentary law was similar to that of the common law. Mason's Manual notes that parliamentary law was built on precedents created by decisions on points of order or appeals and by decisions of courts. It was guided in its development by the authority to make rules inherent in every deliberative body. The common law of parliamentary procedure, however, did not rest upon mere custom but upon reasonable and equitable custom. Mason's Manual notes:

The state legislatures and local governmental bodies copied from Congress. However, the procedure of the state legislatures, local legislative bodies and voluntarily associations now differs greatly from the procedure of Parliament and Congress. While Congress is governed largely by rules adopted by the houses of Congress to meet their local and special needs, the states legislatures – and particularly, the more local bodies, both public and private – are governed by a branch of the common law based upon court decisions and upon precedents and customs of deliberative bodies.

== 20th century to present in the US ==
By the beginning of the 20th century, Robert's Rules of Order had been almost universally adopted by ordinary societies in the US. In 1950, Alice Sturgis published the Sturgis Standard Code of Parliamentary Procedure, later revised in 2001 by AIP as The Standard Code of Parliamentary Procedure, arguing that organizations need not continue operating under 19th century rules, and that it would be better to go with a simpler set of rules. In 1969 George Demeter published Demeter's Manual of Parliamentary Law and Procedure, Blue Book Edition, that was longer and more in-depth than the then current version of Robert's Rules of Order Revised (ROR). In the 21st century, the latest editions of Robert's Rules of Order Newly Revised included coverage of current practices such as electronic meetings and sending communication by electronic means such as e-mail.
