= Suspension of the rules =

Parliamentary procedure

In United States parliamentary procedure, a suspension of the rules allows a deliberative assembly to set aside its normal rules to do something that it could not do otherwise. However, there are rules that cannot be suspended.

== Explanation of use ==
Suspend the rules (RONR)
- Class: Incidental motion
- In order when another has the floor?: No
- Requires second?: Yes
- Debatable?: No
- May be reconsidered?: No
- Amendable?: No
- Vote required: Usually two-thirds (depends on the rule being suspended)

Rules are essential to the regularity of the proceedings. They protect the principles of parliamentary procedure—order, the right of individual members and of minorities to be heard, and the right of a majority to carry out its will. For these reasons, members have a right to insist on the observance of the rules. Yet, the assembly may dispense with certain rules.

Special rules of order, rules contained in the parliamentary authority, the standing rules of the assembly, and rules of order contained in the bylaws or constitution may be suspended. In addition, the bylaws may provide for a specific rule to be suspended.

Depending on the type of rule being suspended, a motion to suspend the rules could be adopted with a two-thirds vote. In many cases, suspension of the rules may take place with unanimous consent. Typically, a member will make a request to consider particular business or take a special action not permitted by the rules. The chair will ask if there is any objection; if there is no objection, the rules are suspended.

== Rules that cannot be suspended ==
Rules which embody fundamental principles of parliamentary law or require a ballot vote and rules protecting absentees or a basic right of the individual cannot be suspended, even by unanimous vote. Thus, the rules cannot be suspended to allow non-members to vote; to authorize absentee or cumulative voting; to waive the requirement of a quorum; or to waive the requirement for previous notice for a bylaws amendment. Moreover, the rules cannot be suspended to take away a particular member's right to attend meetings, make motions, speak in debate, and vote; these can only be curtailed through disciplinary procedures.

Three of the major parliamentary authorities: Robert's Rules of Order Newly Revised, The Standard Code of Parliamentary Procedure, and Demeter's Manual – all agree that provisions in the bylaws that do not relate to parliamentary procedure may not be suspended. Demeter notes how this plays into the reality of parliamentary situations:

Bylaws cannot be suspended even by unanimous vote. But sometimes circumstances, expediency or strong assembly determination in behalf of a cause or proposition make violations necessary. In all such cases of violations, the action taken is illegal per se; but if no one objects at the time, or never challenges it at any time thereafter, a violation never challenged is never a violation.

Similarly, Mason states:

It has been held that public bodies can adopt rules, even by majority vote, that cannot be suspended or amended without a two-thirds vote, but it is also held by the courts that actions, taken in violation of procedural rules of parliamentary law and of adopted rules, are valid nevertheless, since failure to conform to the rules of this class suspended them by implication.

The action is still illegal if it violates a mandatory constitutional provision, since a legislature cannot suspend the constitution.

== Gordian knot ==
One application of the motion to suspend the rules is called the "Gordian knot" motion. If confusion has caused the assembly to get so tangled up in a parliamentary snarl that neither the chairman nor the members can unravel it, a member can move to suspend the rules to start fresh. The use of the "Gordian knot" motion is illustrated in The Standard Code with this example: "Madam President, in view of the confusion about the parliamentary situation, I believe it would be best if we were to cancel out everything that has been done on this motion and start over from the beginning, permitting the motion to be resubmitted in whatever form the maker wishes. I move that the rules be suspended to permit this." The "Gordian knot" version of suspension of the rules was introduced by Floyd Riddick, Parliamentarian Emeritus of the United States Senate, at a meeting of the board of directors of the American Institute of Parliamentarians.

Robert's Rules of Order Newly Revised does not have such a motion. However, the same effect could be done by having the maker of a main motion request to withdraw it. If the assembly approves this request, all adhering motions to the main motion cease to be before the assembly as well.

== United States Congress ==
In the House of Representatives of the US Congress, motions to suspend the rules are in order on Mondays, Tuesdays, Wednesdays, and during the last six days of a session. The Committee on Rules normally releases a list of bills and resolutions to be suspended for the week as were requested by the various committee chairmen. The motion is made on the House floor, which is debatable for 20 minutes each by the proponent and an opponent of the measure. Two-thirds of the Members present and voting must vote in the affirmative for the rules to be suspended and pass, adopt, or agree to the measure. Most measures that are passed in this manner are noncontroversial and are often bipartisan.

In the United States Senate, the motion to suspend the rules is allowed only with notice or by unanimous consent.

== See also ==
- Nuclear option
