= List of books with Robert's Rules in the title =

Robert's Rules of Order is the short title of a book, written by Henry Martyn Robert, that is intended to be a guide for conducting meetings and making decisions as a group. Originally published in 1876, it has been revised regularly through the years, including two major revisions, by Robert and his heirs based on feedback from users.

The earliest editions of his work are now in the public domain. Numerous titles have been published based on the public domain editions by those not associated with the original author nor his heirs.

As of its publication in 2020, the 12th edition of Robert's Rules of Order Newly Revised (RONR) is the only current official version of the body of work known as "Robert's Rules of Order".

== Current official edition ==
The following edition "supersedes all previous editions and is intended automatically to become the parliamentary authority in organizations whose bylaws prescribe "Robert's Rules of Order", "Robert's Rules of Order Revised", "Robert's Rules of Order Newly Revised", or "the current edition of" any of these titles, or the like, without specifying a particular edition."

- Robert, Henry M.; Robert, Sarah Corbin; Robert III, Henry M.; Evans, William J.; Honemann, Daniel H.; Balch, Thomas J.; Seabold, Daniel E.; and Gerber, Shmuel (2020). Robert's Rules of Order Newly Revised 12th Edition. New York, NY: PublicAffairs. 714 pages.

=== Older editions ===
The following editions were published by the original author or his successors and were the official editions at the time they were published. They have all been superseded by the current official edition.

- Robert, Henry M.; Robert, Sarah Corbin; Robert III, Henry M.; Evans, William J.; Honemann, Daniel H.; Balch, Thomas J.; Seabold, Daniel E.; and Gerber, Shmuel (2011). Robert's Rules of Order Newly Revised 11th Edition. Philadelphia, PA: Da Capo Press. 716 pages.
- Robert, Henry M.; Robert, Sarah Corbin; Robert III, Henry M.; Evans, William J.; Honemann, Daniel H.; and Balch, Thomas J. (2000). Robert's Rules of Order Newly Revised 10th Edition. Cambridge, MA: Perseus Books Group. 704 pages. (This edition was also called the "Millennium Edition".)
- Robert, Henry M.; Robert, Sarah Corbin; Robert III, Henry M.; and Evans, William J. (1990). The Scott, Foresman Robert's Rules of Order Newly Revised 1990 Edition (9th ed.). Glenview, IL: Scott, Foresman and Company. 706 pages.
- Robert, Henry M.; Robert, Sarah Corbin; Robert III, Henry M.; Cleary, James W.; and Evans, William J. (1981). The Scott, Foresman Robert's Rules of Order Newly Revised (8th ed.). Glenview, IL: Scott, Foresman and Company. 594 pages.
- Robert, Henry M.; Robert, Sarah Corbin; Robert III, Henry M.; Cleary, James W.; and Evans, William J. (1970). Robert's Rules of Order Newly Revised (7th ed.). Glenview, IL: Scott, Foresman and Company. 594 pages. (This book was the second major revision of the work.)
- Robert, Henry M. (1951). Robert's Rules of Order Revised Seventy-fifth Anniversary Edition (6th ed.). Chicago, IL: Scott, Foresman and Company (There were also printings by Ryerson Press of Toronto). 326 pages. (This book was edited by Isabel H. Robert and Sarah Corbin Robert.)
  - Robert, Henry M. (1976). Robert's Rules of Order Revised One Hundredth Anniversary Edition. Mattituck, NY: Aeonian Press (Amereon Ltd). 326 pages. (This book was the official re-printing of the 1951 6th ed.)
- Robert, Henry M. (1943). Robert's Rules of Order Revised for Deliberative Assemblies (5th ed.). Chicago, IL: Scott, Foresman and Company (There was also a printing by Ryerson Press of Toronto). 326 pages. (This book was edited by Isabel H. Robert and Sarah Corbin Robert.)
- Robert, Henry M. (1915). Robert's Rules of Order Revised for Deliberative Assemblies (4th ed.). Chicago, IL: Scott, Foresman and Company (There were also printings by William Briggs/Ryerson Press of Toronto). 323 pages. (This book was the first major revision of the work. It is now in the public domain.)
  - Robert, Henry M. and Robert III, Henry M. (1971). Robert's Rules of Order Revised. New York: William Morrow and Company. 323 pages. (This book was the official re-printing of the 1915 4th ed. in paperback format with a new foreword by Henry M. Robert III.)
- Robert, Henry M. (1893). Pocket Manual of Rules of Order for Deliberative Assemblies ("Robert's Rules of Order") (3rd ed.). Chicago, IL: S. C. Griggs & Company (Scott, Foresman and Company in later printings). 218 pages. (This book is now in the public domain.)
- Robert, Henry M. (1876). Pocket Manual of Rules of Order for Deliberative Assemblies ("Robert's Rules of Order") (2nd ed.). Chicago, IL: S. C. Griggs & Company (There was also a printing by Baker and Taylor Company of New York). 192 pages. (This book is now in the public domain.)
- Robert, Henry M. (1876). Pocket Manual of Rules of Order for Deliberative Assemblies ("Robert's Rules of Order") (1st ed.). Chicago, IL: S. C. Griggs & Company. 176 pages. (This book is now in the public domain.)

For details on the changes between the editions, see Robert's Rules of Order#Changes between editions.

The first six editions were not explicitly numbered as editions in the series within the contents of those books. Explicit numbering of the editions began with the 7th edition and the inclusion of the edition number in the title began with later printings of the 9th edition.

The names for the 4th, 5th, and 6th editions are officially abbreviated ROR (Robert's Rules of Order Revised). The names for the 7th, 8th, 9th, 10th, 11th and 12th editions are officially abbreviated RONR (Robert's Rules of Order Newly Revised).

== Current official concise guide ==
The following book is the only authorized concise guide for the current (12th) edition of Robert's Rules of Order Newly Revised and is intended as an introductory book for those unfamiliar with parliamentary procedure.

- Robert III, Henry M.; Evans, William J.; Honemann, Daniel H.; Balch, Thomas J.; Seabold, Daniel E.; and Gerber, Shmuel (2020). Robert's Rules of Order Newly Revised In Brief (3rd ed.). New York, NY: PublicAffairs. 214 pages.

=== Older editions ===
The following books are older editions of the official concise guide.

- Robert III, Henry M.; Evans, William J.; Honemann, Daniel H.; Balch, Thomas J.; Seabold, Daniel E.; and Gerber, Shmuel (2011). Robert's Rules of Order Newly Revised In Brief (2nd ed.). Philadelphia, PA: Da Capo Press. 197 pages.
- Robert III, Henry M.; Evans, William J.; Honemann, Daniel H.; and Balch, Thomas J. (2004). Robert's Rules of Order Newly Revised In Brief (1st ed.). Cambridge, MA: Perseus Books Group. 197 pages. (The title page in this book indicated that it was in accord with the 10th edition of RONR.)

The name of the official concise guide is abbreviated RONRIB (Robert's Rules of Order Newly Revised In Brief).

== Unofficial books ==
The following books were not published by the original author nor his successors. Thus the rules in these books may or may not match those in the current official edition.

=== Summary guides by parliamentarians ===
The following guides were prepared by professional parliamentarians (experts in meeting procedures) who were credentialed with the National Association of Parliamentarians and/or the American Institute of Parliamentarians.

- Jennings, C. Alan (2016). Robert's Rules For Dummies (3rd ed.). John Wiley & Sons, Inc. 432 pages. (This book was on the recommended reading list by the American Institute of Parliamentarians.)
- Slaughter, Jim; Ragsdale, Gaut; and Ericson, Jon L. (2012). Notes and Comments on Robert's Rules (4th ed.). Southern Illinois University Press. 208 pages. (This book was on the recommended reading list by the American Institute of Parliamentarians.)
- Sylvester, Nancy (2010). The Complete Idiot's Guide to Robert's Rules (2nd ed.). Penguin Group. 384 pages. (This book was on the recommended reading list by the American Institute of Parliamentarians.)
- Sylvester, Nancy (2006). The Guerrilla Guide to Robert's Rules. Penguin Group. 256 pages.
- Zimmerman, Doris P. (2005). Robert's Rules in Plain English: A Readable, Authoritative, Easy-to-Use Guide to Running Meetings (2nd ed.). HarperCollins Publishers. 192 pages.

=== Summary guides by others ===
- BarCharts, Inc. (2011). Robert's Rules Of Order (Quick Study: Business). BarCharts, Inc. 6 pages. (laminated sheets)
- Campbell, Barbara (2004). The Everything Robert's Rules Book: All you need to organize and conduct a meeting. Adams Media. 290 pages.
- Cann, Marjorie Mitchell (1991). Robert's Rules of Order - Simplified. Perigee Trade. 71 pages. (This book was originally published in 1990 as Cann's Keys to Better Meetings: Parliamentary Procedure Simplified.)
- ClydeBank Media LLC (2016). Robert's Rules: QuickStart Guide - The Simplified Beginner's Guide to Robert's Rules of Order. ClydeBank Media LLC. 84 pages.
- Cook, Rita (2008). The Complete Guide to Robert's Rules of Order Made Easy: Everything You Need to Know Explained Simply. Atlantic Publishing Group Inc. 288 pages. (In this book, sections were stated as being re-printed from the 1915 4th ed.)
- Little Green Apples Publishing LLC (2015). Robert's Rules of Order ("Study Briefs"). Little Green Apples Publishing LLC. 44 pages.
- McConnell Productions, Robert (2014). Webster's New World Robert's Rules of Order Simplified and Applied (3rd ed.). Houghton Mifflin Harcourt. 432 pages. (In this book's preface on Page xviii, the author stated that this book did not conform to the current official edition on some points.)
- Minetor, Randi (2015). Robert's Rules of Order in Action: How to Participate in Meetings with Confidence. Zephyros Press. 120 pages.
- Rocheleau, W. F. (2014). A Short, Easy Guide to Parliamentary Procedure and Robert's Rules of Order. CreateSpace Independent Publishing Platform. 24 pages. (The copyright page indicated that portions of this book were originally published by the US Department of Agriculture in 1950.)
- Rozakis, Laurie E.; Lichtenstein, Ellen; and the Princeton Language Institute (1995). 21st Century Robert’s Rules of Order. Dell Publishing (Philip Lief Group). 224 pages.
- Rozakis, Laurie E. and Merriam-Webster (1996). New Robert’s Rules of Order. Smithmark Publishers. 336 pages. (This book was originally published in 1994 as Merriam-Webster's Rules of Order.)
- SparkNotes (2014). Robert's Rules of Order (SparkCharts). SparkCharts. 6 pages. (wall chart)
- Speedy Publishing LLC (2014). Robert's Rules Of Order (Speedy Study Guides). Speedy Publishing LLC. 4 pages. (laminated sheets)
- Weisgal, Ted (2014). Robert's Rules for Kids: A Guide to Teaching Children from Kindergarten to the 5th Grade the Basics of Parliamentary Procedure. Wise Wit Publishing Company. 108 pages.

=== Public domain versions ===
The earliest editions of the work by the original author, Henry M. Robert, are now in the public domain. These are the 1st, 2nd, 3rd, and 4th editions that were originally published in 1876, 1876, 1893, and 1915, respectively.

=== Unrelated works ===
There are other works with "Robert's Rules" in the title that are unrelated to meeting procedures and the body of work known as "Robert's Rules of Order". The authors of some of these other works had "Robert" as their first or last name. Usually the titles indicate the subject matter in these books.
