= Proxy voting =

Form of voting that allows delegation

Proxy voting is a form of voting whereby a member of a decision-making body may delegate their voting power to a representative, to enable a vote in absence. The representative may be another member of the same body, or external. A person so designated is called a "proxy" and the person designating them is called a "principal". Proxy appointments can be used to form a voting bloc that can exercise greater influence in deliberations or negotiations. Proxy voting is a particularly important practice with respect to corporations; in the United States, investment advisers often vote proxies on behalf of their client accounts.

== Related systems ==
A related topic is liquid democracy, a family of electoral systems where votes are transferable and grouped by voters, candidates or combination of both to create proportional representation, and delegated democracy.

Another related topic is the so-called Proxy Plan, or interactive representation electoral system whereby elected representatives would wield as many votes as they received in the previous election. Oregon held a referendum on adopting such an electoral system in 1912.

It is possible for automatic proxy voting to be used in legislatures, by way of direct representation (this idea is essentially a form of weighted voting). Reformers propose that instead of electing members from single-member districts (that may have been gerrymandered), members be elected at large, but when seated each member cast the number of votes they received in the last election. Thus, if, for example, a state were allocated 32 members in the U.S. House of Representatives, the 32 candidates who received the most votes in the at-large election would be elected and seated, but each would cast a different number of votes on the floor and in committee. This proposal, some say, would allow for representation of minority views in legislative deliberations, as it does in deliberations at shareholder meetings of corporations. Such a concept was proposed in a submission to the 2007 Ontario Citizens' Assembly process.

Another example is Evaluative Proportional Representation (EPR). It elects all the members of a legislative body. Each citizen grades the fitness for office of as many of the candidates as they wish as either Excellent (ideal), Very Good, Good, Acceptable, Poor, or Reject. Multiple candidates may be given the same grade by a voter. Each citizen elects their representative at-large for a city council. For a large and diverse state legislature, each citizen chooses to vote through any of the districts or official electoral associations in the country. Each grades any number of candidates in the whole country. Each elected representative has a different voting power (a different number of weighted votes) in the legislative body. This number is equal to the total number of highest available grades counted for them from all the voters – no citizen's vote is "wasted". Each voter is represented equally.

Two real-life examples of weighted voting include the Council of Ministers of the European Union and the US Electoral College.

== Use of proxy voting in legislatures ==
The United States parliamentary manual Riddick's Rules of Procedure notes that, under proxy voting, voting for officers should be done by ballot, due to the difficulties involved in authentication if a member simply calls out, "I cast 17 votes for Mr. X."

Proxy voting is also an important feature in corporate governance in the United States through the proxy statement. Companies use proxy solicitation agencies to secure proxy votes.

The rules of some assemblies presently forbid proxy voting. Some legislators plan to forbid proxy voting in the United States House of Representatives.

A recent vote showed 53 Democrats and 26 Republicans voted by proxy. Forbidding proxy voting can result, however, in the absence of a quorum and the need to compel attendance by a sufficient number of missing members to get a quorum. See call of the house.

The Parliament of New Zealand allows proxy voting. Sections 155-156 of the Standing Orders of the New Zealand House of Representatives specify the procedures for doing so. A member can designate another member or a party to cast his or her vote. However, a party may not exercise proxies for more than 25% of its members (rounded upwards). The New Zealand Listener notes a controversial occurrence of proxy voting. The Labour Party was allowed to cast votes on behalf of Taito Phillip Field, who was frequently absent. Theoretically, this was to be allowed only if a legislator was absent on parliamentary business, public business or pressing private business, such as illness or bereavement.

Until the Republican reforms of 1995 banished the practice, proxy voting was also used in U.S. House of Representatives committees. Often members would delegate their vote to the ranking member of their party in the committee. Republicans opposed proxy voting on the grounds that it allowed an indolent Democratic majority to move legislation through committee with antimajoritarian procedures. According to this criticism, on days when Democratic committee members were absent, the Democratic leader in the committee would successfully oppose the sitting Republican majority by wielding the proxies of absent Democrats. Democratic House Speaker Nancy Pelosi temporary reinstated proxy voting in 2020 for members who were unable to be physically present in the chamber due to the ongoing COVID-19 pandemic.

During the COVID-19 pandemic emergency, proxy voting was temporarily introduced in the UK House of Commons. Deputy Chief Whip Stuart Andrew held a large number of proxy votes for other Conservative MPs, and at one stage in 2021 personally controlled a majority of votes in the whole house. He did not always cast these proxy votes the same way, instead following the instructions of individual MPs.

Thomas E. Mann and Norman J. Ornstein write, "In a large and fragmented institution in which every member has five or six places to be at any given moment, proxy voting is a necessary evil".

== Elections ==
Proxy voting is sometimes described as "the frequency with which spouses, union workers, and friends of friends are in effect sent off to the polls with an assignment to complete." The potential for proxy voting exists in roughly one voter out of five, and it is about twice as high at the middle levels of the sophistication continuum. According to W. Russell Neuman, the net effect of the cues provided by friends and associates is not likely to be as significant as those of the political parties.

The possibility of expanded use of proxy voting has been the subject of much speculation. Terry F. Buss et al. write that internet voting would result in de facto approval of proxy voting, since passwords could be shared with others: "Obviously, cost-benefit calculations around the act of voting could also change substantially as organizations attempt to identify and provide inducements to control proxy votes without violating vote-buying prohibitions in the law."

One of the criticisms of proxy voting is that it carries a risk of fraud or intimidation. Another criticism is that it violates the concept of a secret ballot, in that paperwork may be filed, for instance, designating a party worker as one's proxy.

It has been proposed that proxy voting be combined with initiative and referendum to form a hybrid of direct democracy and representative democracy. James C. Miller III, Ronald Reagan's budget director, suggested scrapping representative democracy and instead implementing a "program for direct and proxy voting in the legislative process." It has been suggested by Joseph Francis Zimmerman that proxy voting be allowed in New England town meetings.

Proxy voting can eliminate some of the problems associated with the public choice dilemma of bundling.

=== Albania ===
According to Arch Puddington et al., in Albanian Muslim areas, many women have been effectively disenfranchised through proxy voting by male relatives.

=== Algeria ===
In Algeria, restrictions on proxy voting were instituted c. 1991 in order to undermine the Islamic Salvation Front.

=== Canada ===
In Canada, the province of Nova Scotia allows citizens to vote by proxy if they expect to be absent. The territories of Yukon, Northwest Territories, and Nunavut also allow for proxy voting. Canadian prisoners of war in enemy camps were allowed to vote through proxy voting. David Stewart and Keith Archer opine that proxy voting can result in leadership selection processes to become leader-dominated. Proxy voting had only been available to military personnel since World War II, but was extended in 1970 and 1977 to include voters in special circumstances such as northern camp operators, fishermen, and prospectors. The Alberta Liberal Party ran into some difficulties, in that an unknown number of proxy ballots that were counted may have been invalid. Those who, through proxy voting or assistance of invalids, become knowledgeable of the principal's choice are bound to secrecy.

=== China ===
Some Chinese provinces allow village residents to designate someone to vote on their behalf. Lily L. Tsai notes that "In practice, one family member often casts votes for everyone in the family even if they are present for the election." In 1997, a Carter Center delegation recommended abolishing the proxy voting that allowed one person to vote for three; the International Republican Institute had made a similar recommendation. Proxy voting also became an issue in relation to many of the Wenzhou people doing business outside. Most election disputes revolved around proxy votes, including the issues of who could represent them to vote and what kinds of evidence were acceptable for proxy voting. Intense competition made the proxy voting process more and more formal and transparent. Some villages required a notary to validate faxed proxy votes; some villages asked for faxed signatures; more often villages publicized those proxy votes so that villagers could directly monitor them. Taicang government reported a 99.4% voter turnout in its 1997 election, but a study showed that after removing proxy votes, only 48% of the eligible voters in the sample reported that they actually went to the central polling station to vote.

=== France ===
In France, voters are allowed to temporarily give the power of attorney to another registered voter (online or by paper form) for purpose of voting in an election, provided that the voter making the request visits the national police station or gendarmerie with proof of identity. Applying voters then receive an e-mail receipt to indicate the validation or invalidation of their request. This method is allowed instead or early or mail voting.

Proxy voting was intensely used in both rounds of the 2024 snap legislative election, when many voters were travelling or scheduled to travel on holiday when the election was called. The election resulted in historically-high turnout for a legislative election.

=== Gabon ===
According to Mim Kelber, "in Central Africa, all it takes for a man to cast a proxy vote for his wife is to produce an unwitnessed letter mentioning the name of the person to whom the voting power is delegated." The Gabon respondent to an Inter-Parliamentary Union letter commented, "It has been observed that this possibility was exploited to a far greater extent by men than by women, for reasons not always noble."

=== Guyana ===
Proxy voting played an important role in Guyana politics in the 1960s. Prior to and during the 1961 elections, proxies had been severely restricted. Some restrictions were lifted, and there was a rise in proxy votes cast from 300 in 1961 to 6,635 in 1964. After that election, the Commonwealth Team of Observers voiced concern about proxy votes being liable to fraud. The proxy voting rules were relaxed further, and in 1969, official figures recorded 19,287 votes cast by proxy, about 7% of the total votes cast (an increase from 2.5% in 1964 to 1968). Amidst allegations of fraud, more restrictions were placed on proxy voting in 1973; in that year, about 10,000 votes were cast by proxy.

=== India ===
In 2003, India's People's Representative Act was amended to allow armed forces personnel to appoint a proxy to vote on their behalf.

=== Iraq ===
In Iraq, the Electoral Laws of 1924 and 1946 ruled out the possibility of proxy voting, except for illiterates, who could appoint someone to write for them.

=== Netherlands ===
In the Netherlands, proxy voting is legal and regulated by the Electoral Council. Each voter is allowed to cast up to two proxy votes. Proxy voting is common, with around 10% of all votes having been cast by proxy voting in the 2026 Dutch municipal elections.

Proxy voting made national headlines in 2026, when an unspecified municipal council candidate in the town of Gorinchem was accused of coercing voters into using proxy votes in two polling stations, causing the election to be invalidated and a new election being held.

=== Russia ===
Some instances of proxy voting (usually by family members) in the Russian parliamentary elections of 1995 were noted by observers from the Organization for Security and Cooperation in Europe.

=== United Kingdom ===
The provision for proxy voting in the UK dates back to James I. Long before women's suffrage, women sometimes voted as proxies for absent male family heads.

Under British electoral law, ballot papers could not be sent overseas. British emigrants had no right to vote until the mid-1980s. They can now vote by proxy in general elections if they have been on a British electoral register at some point in the past 15 years. They can also vote by post.

In the United Kingdom, electors may appoint a proxy. An elector can only act as a proxy for two people to whom they are not directly related. However, they can be a proxy for any number of electors if they are directly related to those electors. The voter can change his mind and vote in the election personally as long as his proxy has not already voted on his behalf or applied to vote by mail.

Voters must provide a reason for using a proxy, such as being away on vacation. A narrower subset of reasons is permissible if the proxy is to be for more than one election. Except in cases of blindness, the validity of all proxies must be certified by someone such as an employer or doctor.

In 2004, two Liberal Democrat councillors were found guilty of submitting 55 fraudulent proxy votes and sentenced to 18 months imprisonment.

The Electoral Reform Society has proposed the abolition of proxy voting in the UK except in special circumstances such as when the voter is abroad.

=== United States ===
In 1635–36, Massachusetts granted to the frontier towns "liberty to stay soe many of their freemen at home for the safety of their towne as they judge needful, and that the said freemen that are appoyncted by the towne to stay at home shall have liberty for this court to send their voices by proxy." According to Charles Seymour and Donald Paige Frary, had not proxy voting been implemented, the inhabitants of the frontier towns would have lost their franchises, and the government would have represented only the freemen in the vicinity of Boston. The roads were poor; the drawing of all a village's men at once would have exposed it to Indian attacks; and at election time, the emigrants' labor was needed to get the spring planting into the ground. As late as 1680, and probably even after the charter was revoked in 1684, the Freeman might give his vote for Magistrates in person or proxy at the Court of Elections.

Proxy voting was also adopted in colonies adjacent to Massachusetts. Indeed, traces of the practice of proxy voting remained in Connecticut's election laws until the final supersedure of her charter in 1819.

In Maryland, the primary assemblies allowed proxy voting. After the assembly of 1638, protests were sent to the proprietor in England. It was said that the Governor and his friends were able to exercise too much influence through the proxies they had obtained.

Proxy voting was also used in South Carolina; the proprietors in September 1683 complained to the governor about this system. Proxy voting was used in Long Island, New York as well, at that time. Phraseology was sometimes designed to hide the fact that a proxy system was in use and that the majority of voters did not actually attend the elections. In Rhode Island, the system described as a "proxy" system, from 1664 onward, was actually simply the sending of written ballots from voters who did not attend the election, rather than a true proxy system, as in the assembly of 1647.

In Alabama, the Perry County Civic League's members' assisting illiterate voters by marking a ballot on their behalf was deemed "proxy voting" and "voting more than once" and thus held to be illegal.

During the American Civil War, some northern soldiers used proxy voting. After Ira Eastman's near-victory in New Hampshire, Republicans supported a bill to allow soldiers to vote by proxy, but it was ruled unconstitutional by the state supreme court.

In the Progressive Era, proxy voting was used in Republican Party state conventions in New Hampshire. The Boston and Maine Railroad, the Republican Party's ally, maintained control over the Party by means of these conventions. "At the 1906 state convention, for instance, party delegates were quite willing to trade, sell, or exchange their voting power in return for various forms of remuneration from the party machine. Public outcry led to the end of such 'proxy' voting".

Proxy voting was used in some American U.S. presidential nominating caucuses. In one case, Eugene McCarthy supporters were in the majority of those present but were outvoted when the presiding party official cast 492 proxy votes – three times the number present – for his own slate of delegates. After the nomination of Hubert Humphrey, the New Politics movement charged that Humphrey and party bosses had circumvented the will of Democratic Party members by manipulating the rules to Humphrey's advantage. In response, the Commission on Party Structure and Delegate Selection, also known as the McGovern–Fraser Commission, was created to rework the rules in time for the 1972 Democratic National Convention. State parties were required to ban proxy voting in order to have their delegates seated at the national convention. It was said that these rules had been used in "highly selective" ways.

Several attempts have been made to place proxy voting-related initiatives on the California ballot, but all have failed.

==== United States law on proxies ====
Proxy is defined by supreme courts as "an authority or power to do a certain thing." A person can confer on his proxy any power which he himself possesses. He may also give him secret instructions as to voting upon particular questions. But a proxy is ineffectual when it is contrary to law or public policy. Where the proxy is duly appointed and he acts within the scope of the proxy, the person authorizing the proxy is bound by his appointee's acts, including his errors or mistakes. When the appointer sends his appointee to a meeting, the proxy may do anything at that meeting necessary to a full and complete exercise of the appointer's right to vote at such meeting. This includes the right to vote to take the vote by ballot, or to adjourn (and, hence, he may also vote on other ordinary parliamentary motions, such as to refer, postpone, reconsider, etc., when necessary or when deemed appropriate and advantageous to the overall object or purpose of the proxy).

A proxy can vote only in the principal's absence, not when the principal is present and voting. Where the authority conferred upon a proxy is limited to a designated or special purpose, a vote for another and different purpose is ineffective. A proxy in the usual, ordinary form confers authority to act only at the meeting then in contemplation, and in any adjourned-meetings of the same; hence, it may not be voted at another or different meeting held under a new call. A proxy's unauthorized acts may be ratified by his appointer, and such ratification is equivalent to previous authority. According to the weight of authority, a proxy only to vote stock may be revoked at any time, notwithstanding any agreement that it shall be irrevocable. The sale in the meantime by a stockholder of his shares in a corporation or company automatically revokes any proxies made or given to vote in respect of such shares. And a proxy is also revoked where the party giving it attends the election in person, or gives subsequent proxy. Hence, a proxy cannot vote when the owner of the stock arrives late or is present and votes.

=== Vietnam ===
In Vietnam, proxy voting was used to increase turnout. Presently, proxy voting is illegal, but it has nonetheless been occurring since before 1989. It is estimated to contribute about 20% to voter turnout, and has been described as "a convenient way to fulfil one's duty, avoid possible risks, and avoid having to participate directly in the act of voting". It is essentially a compromise between the party-state, which wants to have high turnouts as proof of public support, and voters who do not want to go to the polling stations. In the Soviet Union, proxy voting was also illegal but done in order to increase turnout figures.

== Nonprofit organization settings in the United States ==
Proxy voting is automatically prohibited in organizations that have adopted Robert's Rules of Order Newly Revised (RONR) or The Standard Code of Parliamentary Procedure (TSC) as their parliamentary authority, unless it is provided for in its bylaws or charter or required by the laws of its state of incorporation. Robert's Rules says, "If the law under which an organization is incorporated allows proxy voting to be prohibited by a provision of the bylaws, the adoption of this book as parliamentary authority by prescription in the bylaws should be treated as sufficient provision to accomplish that result". Demeter says the same thing, but also states that "if these laws do not prohibit voting by proxy, the body can pass a law permitting proxy voting for any purpose desired." RONR opines, "Ordinarily it should neither be allowed nor required, because proxy voting is incompatible with the essential characteristics of a deliberative assembly in which membership is individual, personal, and nontransferable. In a stock corporation, on the other hand, where the ownership is transferable, the voice and vote of the member also is transferable, by use of a proxy." While Riddick opines that "proxy voting properly belongs in incorporate organizations that deal with stocks or real estate, and in certain political organizations," it also states, "If a state empowers an incorporated organization to use proxy voting, that right cannot be denied in the bylaws." Riddick further opines, "Proxy voting is not recommended for ordinary use. It can discourage attendance, and transfers an inalienable right to another without positive assurance that the vote has not been manipulated."

Parliamentary Law expounds on this point:

It is used only in stock corporations where the control is in the majority of the stock, not in the majority of the stockholders. If one person gets control of fifty-one per cent of the stock he can control the corporation, electing such directors as he pleases in defiance of the hundreds or thousands of holders of the remaining stock. The laws for stock corporations are nearly always made on the theory that the object of the organization is to make money by carrying on a certain business, using capital supplied by a large number of persons whose control of the business should be in proportion to the capital they have put into the concern. The people who have furnished the majority of the capital should control the organization, and yet they may live in different parts of the country, or be traveling at the time of the annual meeting. By the system of proxy voting they can control the election of directors without attending the meetings.

Nonetheless, it is common practice in conventions for a delegate to have an alternate, who is basically the same as a proxy. Demeter's Manual notes that the alternate has all the privileges of voting, debate and participation in the proceedings to which the delegate is entitled. Moreover, "if voting has for years ... been conducted ... by proxy ... such voting by long and continuous custom has the force of law, and the proceedings are valid."

Thomas E. Arend notes that U.S. laws allow proxy votes to be conducted electronically in certain situations: "The use of electronic media may be permissible for proxy voting, but such voting is generally limited to members. Given the fiduciary duties that are personal to each director, and the need for directors to deliberate to ensure properly considered decisions, proxy voting by directors is usually prohibited by statute. In contrast, a number of state nonprofit corporate statutes allow for member proxy voting and may further allow members to use electronic media to grant a proxy right to another party for member voting purposes." Sturgis agrees, "Directors or board members cannot vote by proxy in their meetings, since this would mean the delegation of a discretionary legislative duty which they cannot delegate."

Proxy voting, even if allowed, may be limited to infrequent use if the rules governing a body specify minimum attendance requirements. For instance, bylaws may prescribe that a member can be dropped for missing three consecutive meetings.

The Journal of Mental Science noted the arguments raised against adopting proxy voting for the Association. These included that possibility that it would diminish attendance at meetings. The rejoinder was that people did not go there to vote; they attending the meetings for the sake of the meeting, the discussion, and the good fellowship.

In 2005, the Libertarian Party of Colorado, following intense debate, enacted rules allowing proxy voting. A motion to limit proxies to 5 per person was defeated. Some people favored requiring members attending the convention to bring a certain number of proxies, in order to encourage them to politick. In 2006, the party repealed those bylaw provisions due to concerns that a small group of individuals could use it to take control of the organization.

== Corporate settings ==
Under the common law, shareholders had no right to cast votes by proxy in corporate meetings without special authorization. In Walker v. Johnson, the Court of Appeals for the District of Columbia explained that the reason was that early corporations were of a municipal, religious or charitable nature, in which the shareholder had no pecuniary interest. The normal mode of conferring corporate rights was by an issue of a charter from the crown, essentially establishing the corporation as a part of the government. Given the personal trust placed in these voters by the king, it was inappropriate for them to delegate to others. In the Pennsylvania case of Commonwealth ex rel. Verree v. Bringhurst, the court held that members of a corporation had no right to vote by proxy at a corporate election unless such right was expressly conferred by the charter or by a bylaw. The attorneys for the plaintiff argued that the common law rules had no application to trading or moneyed corporations where the relation was not personal. The court found, "The fact that it is a business corporation in no wise dispenses with the obligation of all members to assemble together, unless otherwise provided, for the exercise of a right to participate in the election of their officers." At least as early as the 18th century, however, clauses permitting voting by proxy were being inserted in corporate charters in England.

Proxy voting is commonly used in corporations for voting by members or shareholders, because it allows members who have confidence in the judgment of other members to vote for them and allows the assembly to have a quorum of votes when it is difficult for all members to attend, or there are too many members for all of them to conveniently meet and deliberate. Proxy firms commonly advise institutional shareholders on how they should vote. Proxy solicitation firms assist in helping corral votes for a certain resolution.

Domini notes that in the corporate world, "Proxy ballots typically contain proposals from company management on issues of corporate governance, including capital structure, auditing, board composition, and executive compensation."

Proxies are essentially the corporate law equivalent of absentee balloting. Shareholders send in a card (called a proxy card) on which they mark their vote. The card authorizes a proxy agent to vote the shareholder's stock as directed on the card. The proxy card may specify how shares are to be voted or may simply give the proxy agent discretion to decide how the shares are to be voted. The Securities Exchange Act of 1934 transferred this responsibility from the FTC to the SEC. The Securities Exchange Act of 1934 also gave the SEC the power to regulate the solicitation of proxies, though some of the rules the SEC has since proposed (like the universal proxy) have been controversial. Under Securities Exchange Commission Rule 14a-3, the incumbent board of directors' first step in soliciting proxies must be the distribution to shareholders of the firm's annual report. An insurgent may independently prepare proxy cards and proxy statements, which are sent to the shareholders. In 2009, the SEC proposed a new rule allowing shareholders meeting certain criteria to add nominees to the proxy statement; though this rule has been the subject of intense debate.

Associations of institutional investors sometimes attempt to effect social change. For instance, several hundred faith-based institutional investors, such as denominations, pensions, etc. belong to the Interfaith Center on Corporate Responsibility. These organizations commonly exercise influence through shareholder resolutions, which may spur management to action and lead to the resolutions' withdrawal before an actual vote on the resolution is taken.

Fiduciaries for ERISA and other pension plans are generally expected to vote proxies on behalf of these plans in a manner than maximizes the economic value for plan participants. In these regards, for ERISA plans, fiduciaries and advisers are very limited in the extent to which they can take social or other goals into account.

In the absence of his principal from the annual meeting of a business corporation, the proxy has the right to vote in all instances, but he has not the right to debate or otherwise participate in the proceedings unless he is a stockholder in that same corporation.

The Securities and Exchange Commission (SEC) has ruled that an investment adviser who exercises voting authority over his clients' proxies has a fiduciary responsibility to adopt policies and procedures reasonably designed to ensure that the adviser votes proxies in the best interests of clients, to disclose to clients information about those policies and procedures, to disclose to clients how they may obtain information on how the adviser has voted their proxies, and to keep certain records related to proxy voting. This ruling has been criticized on many grounds, including the contention that it places unnecessary burdens on investment advisers and would not have prevented the major accounting scandals of the early 2000s. Mutual funds must report their proxy votes periodically on Form N-PX.

It is possible for overvotes and undervotes to occur in corporate proxy situations.

Even in corporate settings, proxy voting's use is generally limited to voting at the annual meeting for directors, for the ratification of acts of the directors, for enlargement or diminution of capital, and for other vital changes in the policy of the organization. These proposed changes are summarized in the circular sent to shareholders prior to the annual meeting. The stock-transfer book is closed at least ten days before the annual meeting to enable the secretary to prepare a list of stockholders and the number of shares held by each. Stock is voted as shown by the stock book when posted. All proxies are checked against this list.

It is possible to designate two or more persons to act as proxy by using language appointing, for instance, "A, B, C, D, and E, F, or any of them, attorneys and agents for me, irrevocable, with full power by the affirmative vote of a majority of said attorneys and agents to appoint a substitute or substitutes for and in the name and stead of me."

Proxy voting is said to have some anti-deliberative consequences, in that proxy holders often lack discretion about how to cast votes due to the instructions given by their principal. Thus, they cannot alter their decision based on the deliberative process of testing the strength of arguments and counter-arguments.

In Germany, corporate proxy voting is done through banks. Proxy voting by banks has been a key feature of the connection of banks to corporate ownership in Germany since the industrialization period.

== Liquid democracy ==
Illustration of delegated voting. Voters to the left of the blue line voted by delegation. Voters to the right voted directly. Numbers are the quantity of voters represented by each delegate, with the delegate included in the count.

In liquid democracy (also known as delegated voting), the proxy is transitive and the transfer recursive. Put simply, the vote may be further delegated to the proxy's proxy, and so on. This is also called transitive proxy or delegate cascade. An early proposal of delegate voting was that of Lewis Carroll in 1884.

Delegate voting is used by the Swedish local political party Demoex. Demoex won its first seat in the city council of Vallentuna, Sweden, in 2002. The first years of activity in the party have been evaluated by Mitthögskolan University in a paper by Karin Ottesen in 2003. In Demoex, a voter can also vote directly, even if they have delegated their vote to a proxy; the direct vote overrules the proxy vote. It is also possible to change the proxy at any time.

In 2005, in a pilot study in Pakistan, Structural Deep Democracy, SD2 was used for leadership selection in a sustainable agriculture group called Contact Youth. SD2 uses PageRank for the processing of the transitive proxy votes, with the additional constraints of mandating at least two initial proxies per voter, and all voters are proxy candidates. More complex variants can be built on top of SD2, such as adding specialist proxies and direct votes for specific issues, but SD2 as the underlying umbrella system, mandates that generalist proxies should always be used.

Delegated voting is also used in the World Parliament Experiment, and in implementations of liquid democracy.

== See also ==
- Demeny voting
- Interactive representation
- Symbolic interactionism
