= Beauchesne's Parliamentary Rules and Forms =

Canadian parliamentary authority

Beauchesne's Parliamentary Rules and Forms is a Canadian parliamentary authority. The first edition was published in 1922 by Arthur Beauchesne, Clerk of the House of Commons of Canada from 1925 to 1949.

== See also ==
- Consensus decision-making
- Deliberative assembly
- Principles of parliamentary procedure
- Other works on parliamentary procedure by Clerks of the House:
  - Bourinot's Rules of Order – 1894 parliamentary authority by Sir John George Bourinot
  - House of Commons Procedure and Practice – co-edited in 2000 by Robert Marleau
