= Motion to pass on =

The motion to pass on is a dilatory parliamentary motion used in parliamentary procedure. It is distinct from the motion to table or to postpone to a certain time. The motion delays consideration of a matter for a later time without indicating prejudice with respect to it. According to Mason's Manual, matter passed on in this way remains subject to subsidiary motion. The motion to pass on is not subject to debate, but requires a majority vote.

In the United States House of Representatives, this motion is often put as a request for unanimous consent. For example, during the consideration of a bill, the following dialogue may occur:

- Member: Mr./Madam Speaker.
- The Speaker (pro tempore): For what purpose does the gentleman/gentlewoman from state rise?
- Member: Mr./Madam Speaker, I ask unanimous consent that the bill H.R./S. ____ (or Amendment H.R/S. ___) be laid aside.
- Speaker (pro tempore): Without objection, the bill (or amendment) is laid aside.
