= Friendly amendment =

Concept in parliamentary procedure

In parliamentary procedure, a friendly amendment is an amendment to a motion under debate that is perceived by all parties as an enhancement to the original motion, often only as clarification of intent. Friendly amendments are treated like other amendments.

== Explanation ==
Friendly amendments are often allowed by the chair after consent by the original mover of the motion. According to Robert's Rules of Order, a friendly amendment should not be handled any differently from any other amendment: the entire assembly must consent to the amendment, either by majority vote or through unanimous consent.

== Other uses ==
In Model United Nations, a "friendly amendment" is a change to a resolution that everyone is in favor of, while an "unfriendly amendment" is one that does not have everyone's support.

== See also ==
- Amend (motion)
- Request for permission to withdraw or modify a motion
