= Robert's Rules of Order =

Book on parliamentary procedure by Henry Martyn Robert

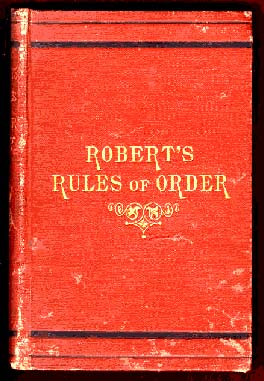
First edition, 1876

Robert's Rules of Order, often simply referred to as Robert's Rules, is a manual of parliamentary procedure by U.S. Army officer Henry Martyn Robert (1837–1923). "The object of Rules of Order is to assist an assembly to accomplish the work for which it was designed [...] Where there is no law [...] there is the least of real liberty." The term Robert's Rules of Order is also used more generically to refer to any of the more recent editions, by various editors and authors, based on any of Robert's original editions, and the term is used more generically in the United States to refer to parliamentary procedure. It was written primarily to help guide voluntary associations in their operations of governance.

Robert's manual was first published in 1876 as an adaptation of the rules and practice of the United States Congress to suit the needs of non-legislative societies. Robert's Rules is the most widely used manual of parliamentary procedure in the United States. It governs the meetings of a diverse range of organizations—including church groups, county commissions, homeowners' associations, nonprofit associations, professional societies, school boards, trade unions, and college fraternities and sororities—that have adopted it as their parliamentary authority. Robert published four editions of the manual before his death in 1923, the last being the thoroughly revised and expanded Fourth Edition published as Robert's Rules of Order Revised in May 1915.

== History ==
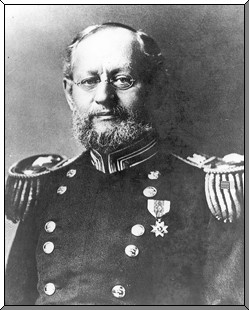
Henry M. Robert

A U.S. Army officer, Henry Martyn Robert (1837–1923), saw a need for a standard of parliamentary procedure while living in San Francisco. He found San Francisco in the mid-to-late 19th century to be a chaotic place where meetings of any kind tended to be tumultuous, with little consistency of procedure and with people of many nationalities and traditions thrown together.

The first edition of the book, whose full title was Pocket Manual of Rules of Order for Deliberative Assemblies, was published in February 1876 by the then-Major Robert, with the short title Robert's Rules of Order placed on its cover.

The procedures prescribed by the book were loosely modeled after those used in the United States House of Representatives, with such adaptations as Robert saw fit for use in ordinary societies. Although he was in the military, the rules in his book were not based on military rules. The author's interest in parliamentary procedure began in 1863 when he was chosen to preside over a church meeting and, although he accepted the task, he felt that he did not have the necessary knowledge of proper procedure.

In his later work as an active member of several organizations, Robert discovered that members from different areas of the country had very different views regarding what the proper parliamentary rules were, and these conflicting views hampered the organizations in their work. He eventually became convinced of the need for a new manual on the subject, one which would enable many organizations to adopt the same set of rules.

Henry M. Robert himself published four editions of the manual before his death in 1923, the last being the thoroughly revised and expanded Fourth Edition published as Robert's Rules of Order Revised for Deliberative Assemblies in May 1915. By this time Robert had long been retired from the Army with the rank of brigadier general. The revisions were based on the feedback from hundreds of letters that Robert had received through the years. In addition, to explain the rules in Robert's Rules of Order Revised (abbreviated ROR), Robert published an introductory book for beginners titled Parliamentary Practice: An Introduction to Parliamentary Law in 1921 and a full book of explanations titled Parliamentary Law in 1923.

== Special rules ==
In those cases in which the bylaws or other governing documents of an organization refer to "Robert's Rules of Order", certain rules in the book may be subordinate to other specified rules, including any conflicting provisions in applicable law, the corporate charter, the constitution or bylaws, and special rules of order.

Even if an organization has adopted Robert's Rules of Order, it can still adopt its own rules which supersede any rules in this book. The only limitations might come from the rules in a parent organization or from national, state, or local law. An example of a rule that organizations sometimes adopt is one that allows the use of proxy voting. Such a rule is not allowed unless the organization specifically provides for it in its bylaws.

== Concise editions ==
Since the copyrights for several of the original editions (1915 or earlier) have expired, numerous other books and manuals have been published incorporating "Robert's Rules of Order" as part of their titles, with some of them based on those earlier editions (see List of books with Robert's Rules in the title). Some examples are

- Robert's Rules of Order (1989) by Darwin Patnode, PhD, past President of the American Institute of Parliamentarians. Simplified and updated based on the original 1876 edition, Thomas Nelson, ISBN 978-0840771995
- Robert's Rules in Plain English, Second Edition (2005) by Doris P. Zimmerman, HarperCollins, ISBN 978-0060787790
- Robert's Rules Simplified (2006), by Arthur T. Lewis and Henry M. Robert, Dover Publications, ISBN 978-0486450964

Robert's Rules of Order Newly Revised In Brief
- Cover of 2020 (3rd) edition
- Author: General Henry M. Robert; Sarah Corbin Robert; Henry M. Robert III; William J. Evans; Daniel H. Honemann; Thomas J. Balch; Daniel E. Seabold; Shmuel Gerber
- Original title: Robert's Rules of Order
- Subject: Parliamentary procedure
- Genre: Reference
- Publisher: Da Capo Press
- Publication date: 2020
- Pages: 214
- ISBN: 978-1-5417-9770-3 (paperback)
- Dewey Decimal: 060.42 ROB
- LC Class: JF515 .R692 2011

Henry M. Robert III, grandson of the original author and Trustee for the Robert's Rules Association, had acknowledged that "there has been controversy among parliamentarians concerning the length of Robert's Rules in its various editions and the complexity of the rules it describes." As a result, a supplemental book was developed.

In 2005, a shorter reference guide, Robert's Rules of Order Newly Revised In Brief (abbreviated RONRIB), was published by the same authorship team and publisher as the Tenth Edition of Robert's Rules of Order Newly Revised (RONR) and was made to be in accord with that edition of RONR. A third edition of this shorter guide was published in 2020 to conform with the current Twelfth Edition of Robert's Rules of Order Newly Revised.

The In Brief book is the only concise guide for Robert's Rules of Order Newly Revised authorized by the Robert's Rules Association, and is intended as an introductory book for those unfamiliar with parliamentary procedure. The authors say, "In only thirty minutes, the average reader can learn the bare essentials, and with about ninety minutes' reading can cover all the basics." It is meant to be an introductory supplement to the current edition of Robert's Rules of Order Newly Revised and is not suitable for adoption as a parliamentary authority in itself.

== Comprehensive editions ==
Robert's Rules of Order Newly Revised
- Cover of 2020 (12th) edition
- Author: General Henry M. Robert (1837–1923); Sarah Corbin Robert (1886–1972); Henry M. Robert III (1920–2019); William J. Evans (1928–2007); Daniel H. Honemann; Thomas J. Balch; Daniel E. Seabold; Shmuel Gerber
- Original title: Robert's Rules of Order
- Cover artist: Pete Garceau
- Publisher: Hachette Book Group
- Publication date: September 1, 2020
- ISBN: 978-1-5417-3669-6 (paperback)
- Dewey Decimal: 060.42 ROB
- LC Class: JF515 .R692 2020

Through a family trust, and later through the Robert's Rules Association (which is made up of descendants of Henry M. Robert), several subsequent editions of Robert's Rules of Order have been published, including another major revision of the work. The Seventh Edition, published in February 1970 on the 94th anniversary of the publication of the First Edition, was the first under the title Robert's Rules of Order Newly Revised (RONR). The subsequent editions were based on additional feedback from users, including feedback received by electronic means in recent years. These later editions included material from Robert's Parliamentary Practice and Parliamentary Law.

The current edition of the series became effective on September 1, 2020, under the title Robert's Rules of Order Newly Revised, Twelfth Edition. This edition states that it:

supersedes all previous editions and is intended automatically to become the parliamentary authority in organizations whose bylaws prescribe "Robert's Rules of Order", "Robert's Rules of Order Revised", "Robert's Rules of Order Newly Revised", or "the current edition of" any of these titles, or the like, without specifying a particular edition.

The authorship team of the current Twelfth Edition consists of a grandson of General Robert, an attorney, a lobbyist and legislative analyst, a mathematics professor, and a copy editor, all of them being experienced parliamentarians.

More than six million copies have been printed (which is a total of all editions).

The following table lists the official versions of the body of work known as Robert's Rules of Order developed by Henry M. Robert and maintained by his successors.

Editions of Robert's Rules of Order, Robert's Rules of Order Revised, and Robert's Rules of Order Newly Revised
Title	Edition	Cover	Year	Authors (posthumous authorial credit in italics)	Publisher
Pocket Manual of Rules of Order for Deliberative Assemblies: Robert's Rules of Order	First		February 1876	Major Henry M. Robert	S. C. Griggs & Company
Pocket Manual of Rules of Order for Deliberative Assemblies: Robert's Rules of Order	Second		July 1876	Major Henry M. Robert (Lieut. Colonel in later printings)	S. C. Griggs & Company
Pocket Manual of Rules of Order for Deliberative Assemblies: Robert's Rules of Order	Third		1893	Lieut. Colonel Henry M. Robert (Colonel, then General in later printings)	S. C. Griggs & Company (Scott, Foresman and Company in later printings)
Robert's Rules of Order Revised	Fourth		1915	General Henry M. Robert	Scott, Foresman and Company
Robert's Rules of Order Revised	Fifth		1943	General Henry M. Robert (Editors: Isabel H. Robert and Sarah Corbin Robert, Trustee)	Scott, Foresman and Company
Robert's Rules of Order Revised	Sixth (75th Anniversary)		1951	General Henry M. Robert (Editors: Isabel H. Robert and Sarah Corbin Robert, Trustee)	Scott, Foresman and Company
Robert's Rules of Order Newly Revised	Seventh		1970	General Henry M. Robert and Sarah Corbin Robert with the assistance of Henry M. Robert III, James W. Cleary, and William J. Evans	Scott, Foresman and Company
Robert's Rules of Order Newly Revised	Eighth		1981	General Henry M. Robert and Sarah Corbin Robert with the assistance of Henry M. Robert III, James W. Cleary, and William J. Evans	Scott, Foresman and Company
Robert's Rules of Order Newly Revised	Ninth		1990	General Henry M. Robert and Sarah Corbin Robert with the assistance of Henry M. Robert III and William J. Evans	Scott, Foresman and Company
Robert's Rules of Order Newly Revised	Tenth ("Millennium")		2000	General Henry M. Robert, Sarah Corbin Robert, Henry M. Robert III, William J. Evans, Daniel H. Honemann, and Thomas J. Balch	Perseus Books
Robert's Rules of Order Newly Revised	Eleventh		2011	General Henry M. Robert, Sarah Corbin Robert, Henry M. Robert III, William J. Evans, Daniel H. Honemann, and Thomas J. Balch with the assistance of Daniel E. Seabold and Shmuel Gerber	Da Capo Press, A Member of the Perseus Books Group
Robert's Rules of Order Newly Revised	Twelfth		2020	General Henry M. Robert, Sarah Corbin Robert, Henry M. Robert III, William J. Evans, Daniel H. Honemann, Thomas J. Balch, Daniel E. Seabold, and Shmuel Gerber	PublicAffairs, an imprint of Perseus Books LLC, a subsidiary of Hachette Book Group.

=== Purpose ===
Generally, Robert's Rules of Order is a guide for conducting meetings and making decisions as a group. The purpose of the book is "to enable assemblies of any size, with due regard for every member's opinion, to arrive at the general will on the maximum number of questions of varying complexity in a minimum amount of time and under all kinds of internal climate ranging from total harmony to hardened or impassioned division of opinion".

The book is designed for use in ordinary societies rather than legislative assemblies, and it is the most commonly adopted parliamentary authority among societies in the United States. It is also recognized as "the most widely used reference for meeting procedure and business rules in the English-speaking world".

The book states that it is "a codification of the present-day general parliamentary law". "General parliamentary law" refers to the common rules and customs for conducting business in organizations and assemblies. It does not refer to statutory legal requirements nor to common-law precedent derived from court judgments. In other words, the book is about procedures for meetings and not about what is "legal" (i.e. it is not a law book).

As a reference, it is designed to answer, as nearly as possible, any question of parliamentary procedure that may arise. The Twelfth Edition contains 633 pages of text, and all of its original content was included because it "has at some time come up as a question of procedure somewhere". The completeness of the book was made so that organizations would not have to write extensive rules for themselves. In addition, members of different organizations could refer to the same book of rules.

Henry M. Robert III responded to the simplification by saying the following:

In an effort to make parliamentary procedure more widely accessible, known, and employed, the approach of "simplification" unfortunately resurrects the very problem that Robert's Rules first emerged to solve. When there are large gaps in the rules, one or more of three major problems occur: much time is spent in debating what the rules are or should be, the chair unilaterally imposes a result, or the majority imposes a result that frequently disregards the rights of the minority. When virtually everyone agrees, an assembly may be able to get by without resort to elaborate rules. When there is serious division, however, it is in human nature that each side will attempt to construe any ambiguity in the rules in such a way as to foster its substantive objectives. The ideal is that the rules applicable to a contentious subject are so clear that the contending sides cannot plausibly differently interpret them to their own advantage. Only then does parliamentary law fully play its role as the neutral arbiter that channels disputes into productive debate over substance, instead of time-wasting and manipulative maneuvering over procedure.

=== Contents of current (12th) edition ===
The contents of the current (12th) edition of Robert's Rules of Order Newly Revised (RONR), published in 2020, include details on the types of groups that use the book, the ways that decisions could be made, and the various situations in which decisions are made.

==== Basics ====
The Introduction in the book provides a history of parliamentary procedure and includes the background and history of Robert's Rules of Order. Rules in the book are based on the rights of the majority, of the minority (especially a strong minority that is greater than one third), of individual members, of absentees, and of all these together. Some fundamental principles upon which the book is based include: one question at a time; one person, one vote; and a vote being limited to members present.

A group that uses the book is called a deliberative assembly. The types of deliberative assemblies are a mass meeting, a local assembly of an organized society (local club or local branch), a convention, a legislative body, and a board. An organization may have rules which could include a corporate charter, a constitution or bylaws, rules of order (special rules of order and parliamentary authority), standing rules, and customs. To conduct business, groups have meetings or sessions that may be separated by more than or be within a quarterly time interval. The types of meetings are a regular meeting, a special meeting, an adjourned meeting, an annual meeting, an executive session, a public session, and electronic meetings.

A member of a deliberative assembly has the right to attend meetings, make motions, speak in debate, and vote. The process of making a decision is done through a motion, which is a proposal to do something. The formal steps in handling a motion are the making of a motion, having a second, stating the motion, having debate on the motion, putting the motion to a vote, and announcing the results of the vote. Action could be taken informally without going through these steps by using unanimous consent. When making a choice, the basic principle of decision is majority vote. In situations when more than majority vote is required, the requirement could include a two-thirds vote, previous notice, or a vote of a majority of the entire membership.

==== Motions ====
The book provides details about main motions including the motion to ratify. In addition, the book lists other motions and provides details (including explanations, forms, and examples) on these motions which include:

- Subsidiary motions – postpone indefinitely, amend, commit or refer, postpone to a certain time, limit or extend limits of debate, previous question, and lay on the table
- Privileged motions – call for the orders of the day, raise a question of privilege, recess, adjourn, and fix the time to which to adjourn
- Incidental motions – point of order, appeal, suspend the rules, objection to the consideration of a question, division of a question, consideration by paragraph or seriatim, motions relating to methods of voting and the polls, motions relating to nominations, request to be excused from a duty, and requests and inquiries (parliamentary inquiry, request for information, request for permission (or leave) to withdraw or modify a motion, request to read papers, and request for any other privilege)
- Motions that bring a question again before an assembly – take from the table, rescind/amend something previously adopted, discharge a committee, and reconsider

Details for each motion include its purpose, when it could be made, if it is debatable, if it is amendable, the vote required for adoption, and if it could be reconsidered. The "order of precedence", or rank, of the motions is also described in detail.

==== Various topics ====
The second half of the book covers various topics in detail. Brief summaries of these topics are as follows:

Depending on the situation, motions could be renewed, or made again. On the other hand, members should not use legitimate motions for dilatory and improper purposes to waste time.

A quorum, or minimum number of members, is required to be present at a meeting in order to validly conduct business. The business that is to come up in a meeting could be listed in an order of business or an agenda.

Each member could get a chance to speak through assignment of the floor and debate. Debate may be limited in the number of speeches and time and should be respectful to others at all times. Voting takes place to decide the course of action and it could be done in a multitude of ways, such as voice vote, standing vote, and ballot vote.

Officers in an organization could be elected through the process of nominations and elections. Each organization decides for itself which officers to have, but the minimum officers in a deliberative assembly are a presiding officer (usually "president" or "chairman") and a secretary. The secretary keeps the minutes, or the official records of the proceedings, for each meeting. As part of their duties, the officers may have reports to give, such as a financial report given by the treasurer. In addition, an organization may have a board to handle business on behalf of the organization. Officers and boards only have such authority and powers that are given to them in the governing documents of the organization. There may also be committees that are formed to assist the organization. The boards and committees may have reports to give as well.

People may gather in mass meetings for a specific purpose or cause. One such purpose of the mass meetings could be for the intent of organizing a permanent society.

Each organization has its basic rules contained in its bylaws. The bylaws could describe the name of the organization and its purpose, the requirements to be a member or an officer, how meetings are scheduled, if there are boards or committees (or both), its parliamentary authority, and how to amend the bylaws.

Representatives from constituent groups may gather as delegates in conventions to conduct business on behalf of the organization. Conventions may consist of several meetings and may last for several days or more on an annual basis or other such infrequent interval.

If members do not act according to the organization's rules, they could be subject to disciplinary procedures. Such action could range from censure to the extreme of expulsion from the organization. Officers could be disciplined by removal from office.

==== Charts, tables, and lists ====
The tinted pages (pages marked by a gray band along the outer edge) in the rear of the book contain the following charts, tables, and lists: (1) "Chart for Determining When Each Subsidiary or Privileged Motion Is In Order", (2) "Table of Rules Relating to Motions", (3) "Sample Forms Used in Making Motions", (4) and (5) "Motions and Parliamentary Steps", (6) "Motions Which Require a Two-Thirds Vote", (7) "Motions Whose Reconsideration Is Prohibited Or Limited", and (8) "Table of Rules for Counting Election Ballots".

=== Additional information related to current edition ===
In addition to containing a summary of basic points from the current (12th) edition of Robert's Rules of Order Newly Revised (RONR), the following contents are unique to the current (3rd) edition of Robert's Rules of Order Newly Revised In Brief (RONRIB): an example of an agenda, additional sample dialogues, frequently asked questions, an example of a call of a meeting, an example of a memorandum listing the order of business, and the following tables: (A) "Handling Motions as chair", (B) "When Chair Stands and Sits", (C) "Conducting a Meeting as chair", (D) "Table of Rules Relating to Motions", and (E) "Words to Use as a Member".

The Robert's Rules Association has also made the Eleventh Edition available in CD-ROM format (designed for installation on Windows PCs) through American Legal Publishing. The CD contains the current editions of Robert's Rules of Order Newly Revised and Robert's Rules of Order Newly Revised In Brief as well as a "Timekeeper's Guide", "Teller's Report", "Sample Rules for Electronic Meetings", various forms, and resources for "Ballot Voting and Understanding Secondary Amendments".

For the first time, an e-book version of the current Twelfth Edition was released by the Robert's Rules Association. Any copy of Robert's Rules of Order that is downloaded online is likely an older edition (1915 or earlier) that is available in the public domain.

Translations of any edition of Robert's Rules of Order into other languages have not been published by the Robert's Rules Association. Any translated copy of Robert's Rules of Order done by a third party may not accurately reflect the correct meaning in the target language.

=== Changes between editions ===
The following table lists some of the changes that were made between the editions of Robert's Rules of Order. The numbered pages may not correspond to the total number of pages in the edition due to additional material in the preface, introduction, and other miscellaneous pages that were not included in the numbering system.

Edition (year)	Numbered pages	Partial list of changes from previous edition
1st (1876)	176	Original edition
2nd (1876)	192	Added "Part III: Miscellaneous" (the 1st Edition only had Parts I and II); Revised Table of Rules and moved it from back of book to front of book
3rd (1893)	218	Motion to lie on the table was changed to "lay on the table"; Filling blanks was moved from "Miscellaneous motions" to under "Motion to Amend"; Added motion to rescind
4th (1915)	323	"Completely reworked and 75 percent enlarged by original author": Significant reorganization of the book (Part III combined into Part II and portions of Part II combined into Part I); Added motion to recess; Added many of the incidental motions
5th (1943)	326	Incorporated only in-page changes planned by General Robert before his death; Expanded index
6th (1951)	326	Added "Principles Underlying Parliamentary Law"; Added "The Parliamentarian"; Added that notice for a special meeting should state its purpose; Added suggested wording for bylaws with regard to the annual meeting, officer terms, and nominating committee
7th (1970)	594	"Enlarged more than twofold and totally recast to be made self-explanatory": Complete reworking of the book in order to maintain copyright; Main divisions of the book changed from "Articles" to "Chapters"; Presented natural order of motions (from lowest to highest rank); Significant expansion of explanation of motions with examples; Added topics including "agenda" and "executive session"; Added tinted pages of charts and tables; Omitted most references to Congress
8th (1981)	594	Recognized that a board is a form of deliberative assembly (unlike a committee); Clarified rule prohibiting interruption of voting; Clarified motions of previous question and lay on the table
9th (1990)	706	Reinserted hints to inexperienced presiding officers (this section was removed from the 7th Edition); Added some principles of interpretation of bylaws and other documents; Recognized that copies of minutes and agenda may be submitted in advance
10th (2000)	704	Re-formatted book, added line numbers, and moved tinted pages from middle of book to end of book (and changed the tint from the color of the entire page to a gray band along the outer edge of the page); Removed some references to being "legal" (parliamentary law is not a court of law); Recognized alternative forms of "chairman" ("chair" or "chairperson"); Recognized customs; Expanded explanation of the point of order and its timeliness including when there is a breach of a continuing nature; Recognized existence of the internet and possible electronic meetings
11th (2011)	716	"Significantly re-edited with expanded and updated treatment of many topics": A new subsection on electronic meetings; Recognized that notice may be sent by electronic communication such as e-mail; More fully explained rules for counting ballots and resolving election disputes; Added definition for a member "in good standing"; A thorough revision of the chapter on disciplinary procedures; Removed more references to being "legal" (parliamentary law is not a court of law); Re-formatted index (which became more compact)
12th (2020)	714	Margins changed to section and paragraph numbers instead of line numbers; Clarifications on motions; Clarification on procedures for approval of minutes; New provisions regarding debate on nominations; Addition of "Sample Rules for Electronic Meetings"; Expanded appendix of charts, tables and lists

Generally, a fuller list and more details of the changes are found in the preface of each edition. A detailed list of changes for the current (12th) edition is provided on the website maintained by the Robert's Rules Association. All the changes were a result of questions and comments received from users.

=== Rule explanations ===
Starting in the period between the Tenth Edition and the Eleventh Edition, the authors released official interpretations of rules in the book onto the website maintained by the Robert's Rules Association. The interpretations from that period were later incorporated into the Eleventh Edition.

In addition, the authors addressed common misunderstandings of the rules coming from frequently asked questions. Some of the misunderstandings involve: when the president can vote, whether ex-officio members can vote, the definition of majority, how abstentions affect the vote, a "friendly amendment", "calling the question", "tabling" a motion, getting items on the agenda, and the contents of minutes. While these misunderstandings are of the rules in the current edition of Robert's Rules of Order Newly Revised, the organization may be governed by other rules which supersede these "default" rules.

The official interpretations and addressed common misunderstandings were a result of questions posted in the Question & Answer Forum at The Robert's Rules Association website. This forum is actively moderated by members of the authorship team.

== Law-making bodies ==
Generally, Robert's Rules of Order is designed for ordinary societies. However, law-making bodies at the local level (such as a city council or a county commission) function similarly to boards of societies. The book has found application to such bodies. Such bodies are also subject to open meeting laws (Sunshine laws) and other applicable laws, all of which supersede any conflicting provisions in the book.

On the other hand, legislative bodies at the state or national level have their own well-defined set of rules (such as Mason's Manual of Legislative Procedure). However, a survey found that four state legislative chambers in the United States still use Robert's Rules of Order.

== Corporations ==
Robert's Rules of Order is based on each member of a group having equal weight as expressed by vote. This book has found application in the corporate world, such as in shareholder meetings and in board of director meetings. However, the rules have to be modified to account for when some individuals within the group have more power than others.

== Parliamentarians ==
A parliamentarian is an expert on parliamentary procedure. To be effective consultants for the organizations they work for, parliamentarians are expected to be knowledgeable on Robert's Rules of Order.

The National Association of Parliamentarians (NAP) is the largest non-profit association of parliamentarians in the world. This organization bases its opinions and instruction upon Robert's Rules of Order Newly Revised (12th ed.). Membership in this organization requires passing an exam which is based on the first half of the concise guide, Robert's Rules of Order Newly Revised In Brief (3rd ed.).

The American Institute of Parliamentarians is another non-profit association of parliamentarians. This organization stresses proficiency and familiarity with a variety of parliamentary authorities, although it states on its website that "Robert's Rules of Order is the most frequently used parliamentary authority". The website also states that it "is the premier manual on parliamentary authority" and "a 'must-have' text for every parliamentarian".

== Youth organizations ==
Youth organizations, such as Business Professionals of America (BPA), Family, Career and Community Leaders of America (FCCLA), Future Business Leaders of America-Phi Beta Lambda (FBLA-PBL), HOSA-Future Health Professionals, the National FFA Organization, SkillsUSA, and the Technology Student Association (TSA), sponsor parliamentary procedure competitions (such as Parli Pro) as part of their programs for their student members. These competitions are based on Robert's Rules of Order Newly Revised. The National Association of Parliamentarians have partnered with some of these organizations.

Robert's Rules of Order are used in Congressional Debate (also referred to as Student Congress), an event put on by the National Speech and Debate Association (NSDA).

Robert's Rules of Order is also used during American Legion and American Legion Auxiliary Boys/Girls State programs and in Model United Nations conferences. While the chair of each committee in a Model United Nations conference may sometimes deviate from the written rules for educational purposes, the format of the rules in the specific committees is mostly based on Robert's Rules of Order. Another program in which Robert's Rules of Order may be used is Model Congress, although the rules in these programs may more closely resemble those in the legislative assemblies that the programs simulate.

Robert's Rules of Order are also used during National Association of College and University Residence Halls (NACURH) Residence Hall Association meetings, regional conferences, and national conferences.

== Alternative rules for organizations ==
=== Other parliamentary authorities ===
Parliamentarians have estimated that about 85 to 95 percent of organizations in the United States use Robert's Rules of Order. The remaining percentage of organizations use other books on meeting procedures. Notable examples of such books on parliamentary authority include Demeter's Manual of Parliamentary Law and Procedure, and Riddick's Rules of Procedure. These books along with Robert's Rules of Order share the general idea of rule of the majority with respect for the minority. A difference may be a "simplification" of the rules. Less popular choices include Atwood's Rules for Meetings and Democratic Rules of Order. Martha's Rules are considerably simpler.

=== Consensus decision-making ===
In modern parliamentary procedure, the usual practice is having a proposal first, then discussion on this proposal with any modifications to it, and finally a vote on it, with majority vote deciding the issue if there are any disagreements. An alternative to this process is consensus decision-making. In this alternative, discussion of potential proposals is held first, followed by the framing of a proposal, and then modifying it until the group reaches a consensus, when there is no longer any disagreement.

As a response to this alternative, the authors of Robert's Rules of Order stated their belief in using debate and majority vote as part of the process in making decisions for the group.

== See also ==
- Parliamentary procedure
- Morin code
