= Disciplinary procedure =

In a deliberative assembly, disciplinary procedures are used to punish members for violating the rules of the assembly.

== Codes and rules ==
According to Robert's Rules of Order Newly Revised (RONR), discipline could include censure, fine, suspension, or expulsion. The officers may be removed from their position, including the position of the chair. If an offense occurs in a meeting, the assembly, having witnessed it themselves, can vote on a punishment without the need for a trial. The chair has no authority to impose a penalty or to order the offending member to be removed from the hall, but the assembly has that power. Mason's Manual of Legislative Procedure states that the power of discipline is within the assembly as a whole and not the presiding officer acting alone.

A trial is required if the offense occurs outside a meeting and the organization's rules do not describe the disciplinary procedures. The Standard Code of Parliamentary Procedure (TSC) states that in trials of disciplinary procedures, members should be given due notice and a fair hearing. The trial could be held in a meeting of the organization or in a meeting of a committee appointed by the organization for such a purpose.

Nonmembers of the body that is meeting have no rights. Nonmembers may be removed by the chair acting alone.

According to the European Court of Human Rights, "it is common practice in Parliaments of the Member States of the Council of Europe that Parliaments exercise control over behaviour in Parliament": the Court notes the importance of orderly conduct in Parliament and recognises the importance of respect for constitutional institutions in a democratic society. Its supervisory role consists in balancing those interests in the specific circumstances of the case against the rights affected in order to determine the proportionality of the interference.

== Types of discipline ==
=== Censure ===
Censure is an expression of strong disapproval or harsh criticism. It can be adopted without formal disciplinary procedures.

=== Fine ===
A member may be assessed a fine for not following a rule. For example, in a club, if a member is not wearing a name badge, that member may be charged a fine. Fines may be assessed only if authorized in the bylaws of the organization.

=== Suspension ===
A member may have a right, some rights, or all rights of membership suspended for a period of time. This action may result in a loss of "good standing" within the organization.

=== Removal from office ===
A member may be removed from office. For example, the president could be temporarily removed from presiding over a meeting using a suspension of the rules. Procedures to permanently remove members from office vary; some organizations allow removal only for cause, while in others, removal may be done at the pleasure of the membership.

=== Expulsion ===
A member may be expelled from the organization or assembly. An example is expulsion from the United States Congress.

== See also ==
- Recall election
