= Select or special committee (United States Congress) =

Special, temporary committee in the US Congress

Establishment of U.S. Congressional Select Committees
- The system originated during the 1st United States Congress.
- Date: April 2, 1789
- Location: Federal Hall, New York City, New York
- Participants: Members of the 1st United States Congress
- Outcome: Formal reliance on temporary, specialized legislative panels; creation of the first select rules committee.

A select or special committee of the United States Congress is a congressional committee appointed to perform a special function that is beyond the authority or capacity of a standing committee. A select committee is usually created by a resolution that outlines its duties and powers and the procedures for appointing members. Select and special committees are often investigative, rather than legislative, in nature though some select and special committees have the authority to draft and report legislation.

A select committee generally expires on completion of its designated duties, though it can be renewed. Several select committees are treated as standing committees by House and Senate rules and are permanent fixtures in both bodies, continuing from one Congress to the next. Examples include the Permanent Select Committee on Intelligence in the House and the Select Committee on Intelligence in the Senate. The Senate Indian Affairs Committee is a select committee, though the word select is no longer a part of its name.

Some select committees are called special committees, such as the Senate Special Committee on Aging. However, they do not differ in any substantive way from the others.

Before the advent of permanent standing committees in the early 19th century, the House of Representatives relied almost exclusively on select committees to carry out much of its legislative work. The committee system has grown and evolved over the years. During the earliest Congresses, select committees, created to perform a specific function and terminated when the task was completed, performed the overwhelming majority of the committee work. The first committee to be established by Congress was on April 2, 1789, during the First Congress. It was a select committee assigned to prepare and report standing rules and orders for House proceedings and it lasted just five days, dissolving after submitting its report to the full House. Since that time, Congress has always relied on committees as a means to accomplish its work.

== Early select committees ==
In the 1st Congress (1789–1791), the House appointed roughly six hundred select committees over the course of two years. The first select committee was an investigation of St.Clair's Defeat, a sense of indignation and horror spread as the General's aide-de-camp delivered a first-hand witness account to President Washington. The account included allegations of poor supplies and training for the militia, prompting a full investigation, William Branch Giles served as chairman. It was also the first investigation into the executive branch.

By the 3rd Congress (1793–95), Congress had three permanent standing committees, the House Committee on Elections, the House Committee on Claims, and the Joint Committee on Enrolled Bills, but more than three hundred fifty select committees. While the modern committee system is now firmly established in both House and Senate procedure, with the rules of each House establishing a full range of permanent standing committees and assigning jurisdiction of all legislative issues among them, select committees continue to be used to respond to unique and difficult issues as the need arises.

The United States Senate did not establish its first standing committees until 1816, so select committees performed the overwhelming majority of the committee work for the Senate during the earliest Congresses. Like the House, standing committees have largely replaced select committees in the modern Senate, but select committees continue to be appointed from time to time.

Early select committees were fluid, serving their established function and then going out of existence. This makes tracking committees difficult, since many committees were known by the date they were created or by a petition or other document that had been referred to them. In a number of instances, the official journal and other congressional publications did not consistently refer to an individual committee by the same title. Though such inconsistencies still appeared during the 20th century, they were less frequent.

== Notable select committees ==
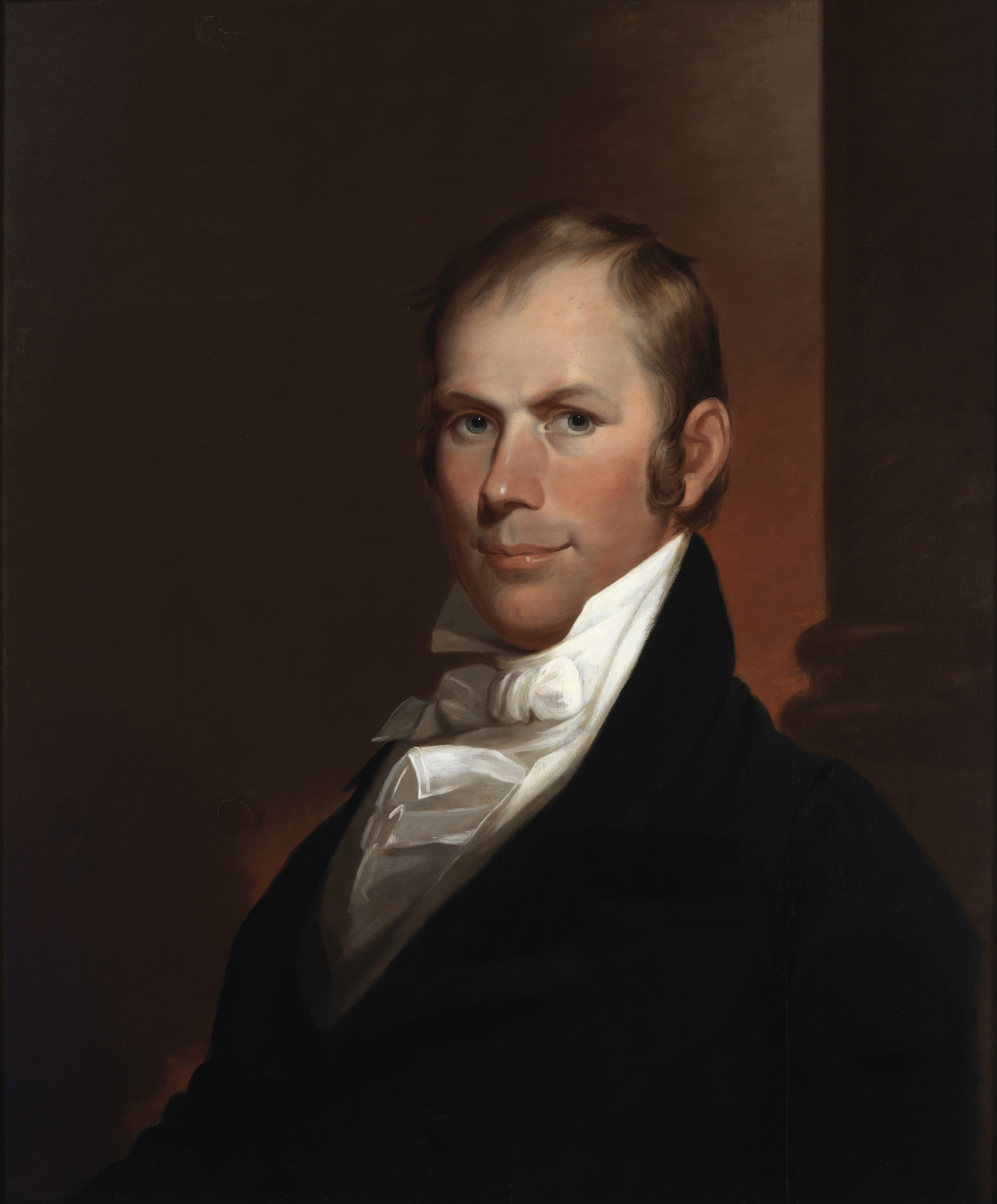
Henry Clay, Chairman of the Select Committee on the Various Propositions for the Admission of Missouri into the Union

While earlier select committees often narrowly tailored to specific issues, some select committees ultimately had a noticeable impact on federal legislation and American history. One was the select committee dealing with Missouri's admission to the Union as a new state. The committee was established in 1821 and lasted just 7 days. Chaired by Henry Clay, the committee helped draft the Missouri Compromise, which attempted to resolve the question of whether slavery would be permitted in newly admitted states.

Some select committees went on to become permanent standing committees. The most notable of these is the Ways and Means Committee. It was first established as a select committee July 24, 1789 during a debate on the creation of the Treasury Department. Representatives had concerns over giving the new department too much authority over revenue proposals, so the House felt it would be better equipped if it established a committee to handle the matter. This first Committee on Ways and Means had 11 members and existed for just two months. In 1801, it became a standing committee, and still operates as one today.

== In the 20th century ==
Notable select and special committees established in the 20th century include:

- House Special Committee on Un-American Activities Authorized to Investigate Nazi Propaganda and Certain Other Propaganda Activities (McCormack-Dickstein Committee): established in 1934 "in reaction to the overthrow of a number of established foreign Governments in favor of communist or fascist systems and reflected concern that foreign propaganda might subvert the U.S. Constitution", the committee's chairman was John W. McCormack of Massachusetts and its vice chairman was Samuel Dickstein of New York. The committee is sometimes cited as a forerunner to the House Un-American Activities Committee.
- Senate Special Committee to Investigate the National Defense Program (Truman Committee): chaired by Senator Harry S. Truman of Missouri, this committee, established on March 1, 1941, by the unanimous consent of the Senate, allowed Truman to rise to national prominence. The committee investigated waste and corruption that hampered U.S. military efforts before and during World War II; it "held hundreds of hearings, traveled thousands of miles to conduct field inspections, and saved millions of dollars in cost overruns". The committee disbanded on January 28, 1948, and its functions were assumed by what became the Senate Governmental Affairs Committee's Permanent Subcommittee on Investigations.
- Senate Temporary Select Committee to Study the Senate Committee System (Stevenson Committee): chaired by Senator Adlai E. Stevenson III of Illinois, the recommendations of this Committee led to the abolition of most of the Senate's select and joint committees, and the reshuffling to jurisdictional lines of Senate committees. The 1970s reorganization was the last major reorganization of the Senate committee system.
- House Select Committee on Assassinations to investigate the assassinations of John F. Kennedy and Martin Luther King Jr. from 1976 to 1978.
- Senate Select Committee on Presidential Campaign Activities (Watergate Committee): chaired by Senator Sam Ervin of North Carolina, this committee investigated misconduct during the 1972 presidential election, most famously the Watergate scandal. The committee disbanded after completing its investigation in June 1974.
- House Select Committee to Investigate Covert Arms Transactions with Iran (Iran–Contra Committee): established in 1987 to investigate the Iran–Contra scandal.

== In the 21st century ==
=== House Select Committee on Energy Independence and Global Warming ===
The Select Committee on Energy Independence and Global Warming was established in 2007 in the 110th Congress (under Speaker Nancy Pelosi) and renewed for the 111th Congress. The committee was advisory in nature, and lacked the legislative authority granted to standing committees. The committee was chaired by Representative Ed Markey of Massachusetts, co-author of the unsuccessful 2009 cap-and-trade legislation (Waxman-Markey) supported by Democrats.

The committee held 80 hearings and briefings on issues such as climate change and the Deepwater Horizon oil spill. The committee played a role in the creation of the 2007 energy bill, the 2009 stimulus package (which contained funds for energy efficiency and other environmental provisions), and the 2009 Waxman-Markey bill (which was passed by the House, but never acted upon by the Senate).

The committee was disbanded by the House in 2011, at the beginning of the 112th Congress, after Republicans took control of the chamber following the 2010 elections.

=== House Select Committee on Benghazi ===
In May 2014, the House of Representatives voted to create the United States House Select Committee on Benghazi to investigate the 2012 attack on a U.S. compound in Benghazi, Libya. The committee spent more than $7.8 million on its investigation over two and a half years, issued its final report in December 2016, and shut down at the conclusion of the 114th Congress. The committee was "one of the longest, costliest and most bitterly partisan congressional investigations in history", lasting longer than the congressional inquiries into 9/11, Watergate, the assassination of President Kennedy, and the attack on Pearl Harbor.

Democrats and critics viewed the inquiry as intended to damage the presidential prospects of former Secretary of State Hillary Clinton, and House Majority Leader Kevin McCarthy prompted controversy when he suggested that Republicans had succeeded with the Benghazi special committee in bringing down Clinton's poll numbers. James Fallows wrote that the committee was an "oppo-research arm of the Republican National Committee, far more interested in whatever it might dig up about or against ... Clinton than any remaining mysteries on the four Americans killed in Benghazi". The committee's "most significant, if inadvertent, discovery" was Clinton's use of a private email server as secretary of state, which prompted an FBI investigation.

The committee's final report found no evidence of culpability or wrongdoing by Clinton, but did criticize Defense Department, Central Intelligence Agency and State Department officials for security lapses. In a dissenting report, Democrats accused the committee and its chairman, Trey Gowdy, "of flagrant political bias while arguing the investigation wasted taxpayer money to try to damage Clinton".

=== House Select Committee to Investigate the January 6th Attack on the United States Capitol ===
On July 1, 2021, Speaker Nancy Pelosi created a select committee to investigate the January 6, 2021 attack on the U.S. Capitol, following the U.S. Senate's failure to overcome a Republican-led filibuster to create a bipartisan January 6 Commission. Bipartisan membership on the committee was a point of significant political contention. Liz Cheney and Adam Kinzinger were the only two House Republicans to serve on the committee, and the Republican National Committee eventually censured them for their participation.

=== Proposed select committees ===
There have been a number of unsuccessful proposals to create select committees. For example, in 2017, Representative Mike Thompson and 162 other Democratic members of Congress unsuccessfully introduced a measure to create a House Select Committee on Gun Violence Prevention to address gun violence in the United States. In the same year, Democratic Senator Chris Coons of Delaware and Republican Senator Cory Gardner introduced bipartisan legislation to create a Select Committee on Cybersecurity.

The United States House Judiciary Select Subcommittee on the Weaponization of the Federal Government was established on January 10, 2023 to fulfill promises made during negotiations for election of the House Speaker by Kevin McCarthy to investigate the Biden Administration's alleged weaponization of the federal government.

== See also ==
- Select committee (parliamentary system)
- Select Committee (United Kingdom)
- Special prosecutor
