= Atwood's Rules for Meetings =

Atwood's Rules for Meetings is a parliamentary authority created for the International Association of Fire Fighters by Dr. Roswell L. Atwood. It is also used by various fire fighting organizations. The rule set is lengthy, but less so than the more popular Robert's Rules.
