= Parliamentary procedure in the corporate world =

Parliamentary procedure in the corporate world may follow traditional parliamentary authorities such as Robert's Rules of Order or simpler rules of order considered by some commentators to be more appropriate in the corporate setting.

== Use of parliamentary authorities in corporate meetings in the United States ==
State statutes typically do not prescribe a particular parliamentary authority to be used in corporate meetings. For instance, the Davis-Stirling Act, a California statute, provides that certain business meetings "shall be conducted in accordance with a recognized system of parliamentary procedure or any parliamentary procedures the association may adopt."

Donald A. Tortorice's The Modern Rules of Order is a parliamentary manual for use in the corporate world. His book includes statements such as "Procedural measures are no substitute for leadership" and "A principal element of these rules is to place the requisite authority in the hands of the Chair to lead the meeting through its business, using these rules as a guide to what should be done and not as an unyielding mandate as to what must be done." However, it is noted that the motion to appeal from the decision of the chair or to declare the chair vacant and elect a new chair remains a procedural safeguard to abuses by the chair.

=== Shareholders meetings ===
The ABA Handbook recommends the abolition of parliamentary procedure at shareholder meetings and the strong concentration of authority in the meeting chair, subject to a fairness standard of conduct, concerning virtually all matters of order, recognition, voting procedures, and adjournment.

With regard to stockholders' meetings, one legal commentator has noted:

Roberts' Rules are viewed as inappropriate for several reasons. First, Robert's and other rules of parliamentary procedure are so complicated that a typical stockholder is unlikely to understand, or become well versed in, their operation. Second, to run stockholders' meetings properly with parliamentary rules, corporations would be required to hire parliamentarians. Finally, and most important, Roberts' Rules were designed for deliberative assemblies in which each member has an equal vote. As a consequence, Roberts' Rules are not well suited to stockholders' meetings where each person's opinion or vote has a different weight depending on the number of shares that person owns. Moreover, Roberts' Rules are especially not well suited to situations in which management has already solicited proxies sufficient to control the outcome of all decisions being made at the meeting.

The case of People v. Albany & Susquehanna R.R. established that a corporate election will be set aside if a faction of shareholders conducted the meeting in a manner that bore the appearance of "trick, secrecy or fraud." Other cases have further limited the power of the chair, noting, for instance, that the chair cannot adjourn a meeting, even in the absence of a quorum, without a vote of the assembly. The principles of majority rule must be followed and cannot be abrogated by the chair.
