= Parliamentary authority =

Book of rules for conducting business

A parliamentary authority is a book of rules for conducting business (parliamentary procedure) in deliberative assemblies. Several different books have been used by legislative assemblies and by organizations' deliberative bodies.

== Application to organizations ==
A group may create its own parliamentary rules and then adopt an authority to cover meeting procedure not covered in its rules or vice versa. Rules in a parliamentary authority can be superseded by the group's constitution or bylaws or by adopted procedural rules (with a few exceptions). The adopted procedural rules may be called special rules of order. The combined rules from all sources is called parliamentary procedure.

Assemblies that do not adopt a parliamentary authority may nonetheless use a parliamentary authority by custom or may consider themselves governed by "common parliamentary law" or the "common law of parliamentary procedure". A society that has adopted bylaws that do not designate a parliamentary authority may adopt one by the same vote required to adopt special rules of order. A mass meeting can adopt a parliamentary authority by a majority vote. The book Robert's Rules of Order Newly Revised states, "In matters on which an organization's adopted parliamentary authority is silent, provisions found in other works on parliamentary law may be persuasive – that is, they may carry weight in the absence of overriding reasons for following a different course – but they are not binding on the body."

== Survey of usage in organizations ==
A poll by Jim Slaughter surveyed American Certified Professional Parliamentarians (CPPs) in 1999 to ask what percent of clients used each parliamentary authority. The results were published in 2000 in Parliamentary Journal, the official journal of the American Institute of Parliamentarians: 90 percent used Robert's Rules of Order Newly Revised (RONR), 8 percent used The Standard Code of Parliamentary Procedure (formerly Sturgis, now AIPSC), and 3 percent used some other authority, including Demeter's Manual of Parliamentary Law and Procedure (Demeter), Riddick's Rules of Procedure (Riddick/Butcher), Bourinot's Rules of Order (Bourinot), and Rules of Order (Davis). Bourinot was used in Canada.

=== Robert's Rules of Order ===
Robert's Rules of Order was first published in 1876 by Henry Martyn Robert. It has been revised several times by the original author and then by his successors. As of its publication in September 2020, the 12th edition of Robert's Rules of Order Newly Revised is the current official edition of the body of work known as "Robert's Rules of Order". This body of work is the most popular and well-known parliamentary authority in the United States.

=== The Standard Code of Parliamentary Procedure ===
The Standard Code of Parliamentary Procedure was first published in 1950 by Alice Sturgis and referred to as TSC or Sturgis. A new book, titled American Institute of Parliamentarians Standard Code of Parliamentary Procedure (AIPSC), was published in 2012. AIPSC is used by many United States medical associations of physicians and dentists, including the American Medical Association House of Delegates and American Association of Orthodontists as well as by the Association of Flight Attendants.

=== Demeter's Manual of Parliamentary Law and Procedure ===
Demeter's Manual of Parliamentary Law and Procedure, first published in 1948 by George Demeter, is another parliamentary authority in North America. It is often favored by North American labor unions and Hellenic organizations. As of 2016, Demeter is published by the American Institute of Parliamentarians.

== Legislative assemblies ==
Legislative assemblies in all countries, because of their nature, tend to have specialized rules that differ from parliamentary procedure used by clubs and organizations.

=== Westminster-style Parliaments ===
The UK Parliament follows Erskine May's Treatise on the Law, Privileges, Proceedings and Usage of Parliament (also known as Erskine May: Parliamentary Practice). There are also the Standing Orders for each House.

The House of Commons of Canada follows Beauchesne's Parliamentary Rules and Forms. Bourinot's Rules of Order is another book used in Anglophone Canada. In Quebec, the Procédure des assemblées délibérantes (commonly known as Le Code Morin) are rules of order in French.

The Australian House of Representatives follows House of Representatives Practice. The Australian Senate follows Odgers' Australian Senate Practice. Each Australian state and territory house of Parliament has its own rules. A number of procedural reference works are used by other organisations in Australia.

=== Legislatures in the United States ===
The United States Senate follows the Standing Rules of the United States Senate, while the United States House of Representatives follows its own procedures, which include Jefferson's Manual.

Of the 99 state legislative chambers in the United States (two for each state except Nebraska, which has a unicameral legislature), Mason's Manual of Legislative Procedure governs parliamentary procedures in 70, Jefferson's Manual governs 13, and Robert's Rules of Order governs four.

Mason's Manual, originally written in 1935 by constitutional scholar and former California Senate staff member Paul Mason, and since his death revised and published by the National Conference of State Legislatures (NCSL), governs legislative procedures in instances where the state constitution, state statutes, and the chamber's rules are silent. According to the NCSL, one of the many reasons that most state legislatures use Mason's Manual instead of Robert's Rules of Order is because Robert's Rules applies best to private organizations and civic groups that do not meet in daily public sessions. Mason's Manual, on the other hand, is geared specifically toward state legislative bodies.

Legislative bodies at the local level, such as a city council or a county commission, function similarly to boards of societies and as such, have used Robert's Rules of Order.

=== Civil law Parliaments ===
Parliaments in post-Napoleonic legal systems, characterized by a strong predominance of written law, also have codes that complement collections of parliamentary practice with the print of constitutional provisions and parliamentary rules. These codes draw on parliamentary reports, including the oldest ones, to identify the rationale behind a parliamentary procedure and can give rise to full-fledged commentaries. In this way, the parliamentary code «becomes a collection and a compass, a reference text and a guide», much like the volumen, the scroll of the libraries of the ancient world.
