= Consideration by paragraph =

Consider by paragraph (RONR)
- Class: Incidental motion
- In order when another has the floor?: No
- Requires second?: Yes
- Debatable?: No
- May be reconsidered?: No
- Amendable?: Yes
- Vote required: Majority

In parliamentary procedure, using Robert's Rules of Order Newly Revised (RONR), the motion to consider by paragraph (or consider seriatim) is used to consider separately the different parts of a report or long motion consisting of a series of resolutions, paragraphs, articles, or sections that are not totally separate questions.

== Procedure ==
For the procedure of consideration by paragraph, each part is considered tentatively and amended as necessary. No vote is taken on each part. When all the parts have been considered, the entire motion is considered and voted on as a whole.

== Use ==
Considering by paragraph or seriatim is the usual method for handling a revision of the bylaws or a lengthy amendment containing several sections.

== Related motion ==
This motion is distinct from a division of the question, which is used to split a motion into separate motions, each of which are considered and voted on separately. In consideration by paragraph, there is no such separate vote.
