= Division of a question =

Motion in parliamentary procedure

In parliamentary procedure, a motion for division of a question is used to separate a motion into a set of motions.

== History ==
The concept of a division of a question dates back to at least 1640, when the Lex Parliamentaria noted, "If a Question upon a Debate contains more Parts than one, and Members seem to be for one Part, and not for the other; it may be moved, that the same may be divided into two, or more Questions: as Dec. 2, 1640, the Debate about the Election of two Knights was divided into two Questions."

== Explanation and use ==
Division of a question (RONR)
- Class: Incidental motion
- In order when another has the floor?: No
- Requires second?: Yes
- Debatable?: No
- May be reconsidered?: No
- Amendable?: Yes
- Vote required: Majority

A motion for division of a question is used to split a motion into separate motions which are debated and voted on separately.

According to Robert's Rules of Order Newly Revised (RONR), this motion is applicable when each of the different parts, although relating to a single subject, is capable of standing as a complete proposition without the others. The motion is made by saying, for instance, "I move to divide the resolution so as to consider separately...."

A motion to divide the question is not required when a single motion seeks approval of a series of propositions or resolutions on different subjects. Any member may obtain separate discussion and voting on any of the unrelated propositions or resolutions by making a demand for separate consideration, at any time before the unified motion is put to a vote.

== Examples ==
In the British House of Commons, a formal motion is not required to divide the question; since 1888, the Speaker has held that a question consisting of two or more propositions, each of which is able to stand on its own, can be divided on the objection of any Member of Parliament.

In the European Parliament, the division of a question is known as split voting. It may be requested by a political group or at least 40 members, when "the text to be put to the vote contains two or more provisions or references to two or more points[...]". The members of parliament will consequently vote on each provision separately.

== Related motions ==
Consideration by paragraph, consider by parts, or consider seriatim are names for a similar motion whereby a complex motion is broken up to be deliberated part by part. Each part is considered tentatively and amended as necessary, then the whole motion is considered and voted on as a whole. This differs from the motion to divide a question which splits the motion into two or more independent motions that are taken up in sequence. Each new motion is deliberated and voted upon before taking up the next part.

Division of the question is not to be confused with division of the assembly, which is a call for a rising vote.
