= Bourinot's Rules of Order =

Parliamentary authority by Sir John George Bourinot

Bourinot's Rules of Order is a Canadian parliamentary authority originally published in 1894 by (the younger) Sir John George Bourinot, Clerk of the House of Commons of Canada under the title A Canadian Manual on the Procedure at Meetings of Shareholders and Directors of Companies, Conventions, Societies, and Public Assemblies generally. The title page states that it is an abridgement of the author's larger work, but it should be seen as a shorter re-write, dealing in considerable depth with public meetings outside and separate from the Parliament in Ottawa. The fourth, posthumous, edition of the work was given the cover title of the present article. The document is widely used in Canada to set procedures for formal meetings in government, companies and other organizations.

== Editions and printings ==
The first three printings by Carswell in Toronto, dated 1894, 1911 and 1914, are identical in title, text, and pagination (1 p.l., [v]-viii, 444 pages).

The fourth printing by McClelland, Goodchild & Stewart (Toronto, 1918), prepared by Thomas Barnard Flint, was identical to the previous versions, except that it dropped the Fourth Part Church synods and conferences and the Fifth Part Municipal Councils, was re-paginated to viii, 208 pages and the title was changed to Rules Of Order being a Canadian Manual on the Procedure at Meetings of Shareholders and Directors of Companies, Conventions, Societies and Public Assemblies Generally. This was the first printing to use "Rules of Order" in the title.

The 1924 printing by McClelland & Stewart, Rules of Order: Being a Canadian Manual on the Procedure at Meetings of Shareholders and Directors of Companies, Conventions, Societies and Public Assemblies Generally has the identical text and pagination (iv, [2], 208, but with minor changes to the numbering of the preliminary leaves) as the fourth printing, but Bourinot's name was added to the cover title as Bourinot's Rules of Order, most probably in response to the American publication Robert's Rules of Order.

Bourinot's larger work, Parliamentary Procedure and Practice: With a Review of the Origin, Growth and Operation of Parliamentary Institution in the Dominion of Canada, and an Appendix, Containing the British North America Act of 1867 and Amending Acts, from which this was derived, was first published in 1884 in Montreal by Dawson Brothers, with further editions in 1892, 1903, and 1916.

A fourth edition, titled Bourinot's Rules of Procedures and edited by Geoffrey Stanford, was published in 1995.

== Bibliography ==
- Bourinot, John George (1918). Rules of Order: Being a Canadian Manual on the Procedure at Meetings of Shareholders and Directors of Companies, Conventions, Societies and Public Assemblies Generally. McClelland, Goodchild & Stewart. ISBN 9780665717277.
- Stanford, Geoffrey (1995-05-08). Bourinot's Rules of Order (4 ed.). McClelland & Stewart. ISBN 978-0-7710-8336-5.

== See also ==
- Parliamentary procedure
- Beauchesne's Parliamentary Rules and Forms – parliamentary authority also written by a former Clerk of the House.
- Robert Marleau – co-editor of the 2000 edition of House of Commons Procedure and Practice
- Robert's Rules of Order – American parliamentary authority first published in 1876
