= Principles of parliamentary procedure =

General principles of parliamentary procedure include rule of the majority with respect for the minority, member rights, one question at a time, one vote per person, only members present can vote, changing action previously decided on, following own specific rules, absentee members rights, nonmembers rights. The purpose of parliamentary procedure is for the assembly to conduct its businesses in the most efficient way possible while protecting the rights of its members.

== Principles ==
=== Majority rule ===
The basic principle of decision is majority vote.

=== Minority rights ===
The minority have certain rights that only a supermajority, such as a two-thirds vote, can overrule. Such rights include introducing new business and speaking in debate.

=== Member rights ===
Members have the right to attend meetings, speak in debate, make (and second) motions, and vote; when the vote is by ballot, there is an additional right of secrecy in how the member votes. Other rights include nominating (and being nominated) to office, running for or being elected to office, and receiving proper notice of all meetings. A member cannot be individually deprived of any these rights except through disciplinary procedures.

Members have the right to know what they are deciding on. The assembly acts with fairness and good faith. All members are treated equally. Members are expected to be of honorable character.

=== One question at a time ===
Only one main motion can be pending at a time. According to Robert's Rules of Order Newly Revised (RONR), this rule is considered to be a fundamental principle of parliamentary law.

=== One person, one vote ===
Each member has a vote and each vote is weighted equally. RONR also considers this principle to be a fundamental rule of parliamentary law. Exceptions to this rule, such as cumulative voting, must be expressly provided for in the organization's fundamental rules.

=== Only members present can vote ===
As yet another fundamental principle, it's established that the decisions made by members present at a meeting are the official acts in the name of the organization. Exceptions for absentee voting would have to be expressly provided for in the organization's rules. Nonmembers are not allowed to vote. Any member can abstain from voting at any time, unless the committee or organization strictly prohibits it, which may be the case especially for groups of nine or less individuals.

=== Changing action previously decided on ===
Actions cannot be in conflict with a decision previously made unless that action is rescinded or amended. The body can change the rules it wants to follow as long as it follows the rules for making such changes.

Under RONR, the requirements for changing a previous action are greater than those for taking the new actions. A motion to rescind, repeal or annul, or amend something already adopted, for instance, requires a two-thirds vote, a majority with previous notice, or a majority of the entire membership. According to The Standard Code of Parliamentary Procedure, however, a repeal or amendment of something previously adopted requires only the same vote (usually a simple majority) and the same notice that was needed to adopt it in the first place.

=== Following own specific rules ===
The group must have the authority to take the actions it purports to take. To be valid, any action or decision of a body must not violate any applicable law or constitutional provision.

=== Absentee members rights ===
Certain actions require previous notice, which protects the rights of absentees. This includes notice of the meetings. There also needs to be a quorum, that is the minimum number of members that should to be present lest the meeting be rendered invalid.

=== Nonmembers rights ===
Under RONR nonmembers have none of these rights and the assembly can exclude any or all of them from the proceedings.
