= Henry Martyn Robert =

American soldier, engineer, and author (1837–1923)

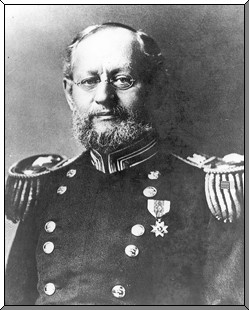
- Born: May 2, 1837; Robertville, South Carolina
- Died: May 11, 1923 (aged 86) Hornell, New York
- Buried: Arlington National Cemetery
- Allegiance: United States
- Branch: United States Army (Union Army)
- Service years: 1857–1901
- Rank: Brigadier general
- Commands: Chief of Engineers
- Conflicts: Pig War (1859) (San Juan Island); American Civil War (1861-1865) (Army of the Potomac)
- Other work: Robert's Rules of Order (1876)

Engineer Commissioner of the District of Columbia
- In office February 14, 1890 – October 15, 1891
- President: Benjamin Harrison
- Preceded by: Charles Walker Raymond
- Succeeded by: William Trent Rossell

Henry Martyn Robert (May 2, 1837 – May 11, 1923) was an American Army general, engineer, and author. In 1876, Robert published the first edition of his reference manual of parliamentary procedure, Robert's Rules of Order, which even today (150 years later) remains the most common authority on democratic parliamentary procedure in the United States.

== Life and career ==
Robert was born in Robertville, South Carolina, and raised in Ohio, where his father moved the family because of his strong opposition to slavery. Robert's father, Reverend Joseph Thomas Robert, later became the first president of historically black Morehouse College, where there is a dormitory on the campus named after him.

Robert was nominated to West Point and graduated fourth in his class in 1857, becoming a military engineer. Under command of Silas Casey during the Pig War, he built fortifications on San Juan Island. In the American Civil War, he was assigned to the Corps of Engineers and worked on the defenses of Washington, D.C., Philadelphia, and several New England ports.

Robert served as Engineer of the Army's Division of the Pacific from 1867 to 1871. He then spent two years improving rivers in Oregon and Washington and six years developing the harbors of Green Bay and other northern Wisconsin and Michigan ports. He subsequently improved the harbors of Oswego, New York, Philadelphia, and Long Island Sound and constructed locks and dams on the Cumberland and Tennessee rivers. From 1890 to 1891 he served as a member of the Board of Commissioners for the District of Columbia. As Southwest Division Engineer from 1897 to 1901, Robert studied how to deepen the Southwest Pass of the Mississippi River.

Robert was president of the Board of Engineers from 1895 to 1901. He received a tombstone promotion to brigadier general and was appointed Chief of Engineers on April 30, 1901, just before he retired from the Army on May 2, 1901. Following retirement, he chaired the board of engineers that designed the Galveston, Texas seawall following the Galveston hurricane of 1900.

Robert died in Hornell, New York, and is buried at Arlington National Cemetery.

== Legacy ==
Robert is most famous for his Pocket Manual of Rules of Order for Deliberative Assemblies (later known as "Robert's Rules of Order")—a collection of rules regarding parliamentary procedure, published in 1876. He wrote the manual in response to his poor performance leading a meeting at the First Baptist Church in New Bedford, Massachusetts. The meeting erupted into open conflict because of concerns about local defense, and he resolved to learn about parliamentary procedure before attending another meeting. The rules are loosely based on procedures used in the United States House of Representatives, but the rule book was not intended for use in national and state legislatures. At the time, Robert was a resident of Haworth, New Jersey.

== Bibliography ==
- Pocket Manual of Rules of Order for Deliberative Assemblies ("Robert's Rules of Order"). Chicago: S. C. Griggs & Company. 1876.
- Robert's Rules of Order Revised for Deliberative Assemblies. Chicago: Scott, Foresman and Company. 1915.
- Parliamentary Practice: An Introduction to Parliamentary Law. New York: Century Co. 1921.
- Parliamentary Law. New York: Century Co. 1923.

== Sources ==
This article contains public domain text from "Brigadier General Henry M. Robert". Portraits and Profiles of Chief Engineers. Archived from the original on March 6, 2005.

Military offices
Preceded by John Moulder Wilson	Chief of Engineers; 1901	Succeeded by John W. Barlow
