= Parli Pro =

Parli Pro is a shortened name for the National FFA Organization Parliamentary Procedure Career Development Event.

The FFA Parliamentary Procedure Contest is based on a two-part demonstration of parliamentary procedure knowledge, a knowledge test, and a 10 to 13 minute, depending on the state, demonstration of parliamentary law. Six students form a team who demonstrates a local FFA Chapter meeting. A single motion is handled as in a real meeting. Each team member is given a specific topic or motion in which he and she is to perform (i.e. to refer a matter to a committee, postpone definitely, extend limits or debate, appeal, etc.). Contestants are judged on public speaking skills, debate, proper use of parliamentary procedure, and parliamentary procedure knowledge. The president, or chairman, is judged on the ability to preside, etc.

The contest, like other FFA Career Development Events, are held at the sectional, regional, state, and national levels. Most parli pro contests are based on an elimination system, in which teams perform in rounds, where the best 4 - 6 teams are moved on to the next round. At the state and national levels, the top teams can be separated by mere points (out of 1000 total contest points).

Parli Pro is one of many Leadership Development Events (LDEs) held each year, including Extemporaneous Public Speaking, Prepared Public Speaking, Creed Contest, Sectional Opening, and Closing, and Job Interview.

== National Winners ==
Each State Association names a State Winner and that team is therefore eligible to compete in the National Contest.

=== Current Winners ===
As of October 2025, the current winners of the National FFA Parliamentary Procedure Leadership Development Event are:

First Place: Bear River FFA (California)

Second Place: Asotin FFA (Washington)

Third Place: Chandler FFA (Arizona)

Fourth Place: DeRidder FFA (Louisiana)

=== Past winners ===
1992 - Ritzville (Washington)

1993 - Troy (Missouri)

1994 - Carthage (Missouri)

1995 - Carthage (Missouri)

1996 - Carthage (Missouri)

1997 - Ritzville (Washington)

1998 - Bear River (California)

1999 - Troy (Missouri)

2000 - Cheyenne (Wyoming)

2001 - Sierra (California)

2002 - Bear River (California)

2003 - Bear River (California)

2004 - Cheyenne (Wyoming)

2005 - Moriarty (New Mexico)

2006 - Stockton (Missouri)

2007 - Foot Hill (California)

2008 - Millennium (Arizona)

2009 - Sullivan (Illinois)

2010 - Eldon (Missouri)

2011 - Nevada Union (California)

2012 - Minarets (California)

2013 - Kingfisher (Oklahoma)

2014 - Eldon (Missouri)

2015 - San Luis Obispo (California)

2016 - O’ Neals Minrets (California)

2017 - Liberty Ranch (California)

2018 - Lake Butler (Florida)

2019 - Imperial (Nebraska)

2020 - No Winner Due to the COVID-19 Pandemic

2021- Galt Liberty Ranch (California)

2022 - Lafayette (Florida)

2023 - Galt Liberty Ranch (California)

2024 - Lafayette (Florida)

2025 - Bear River (California)

== See also ==
- Robert's Rules of Order
