= Martha's Rules =

Parliamentary procedure

Martha's Rules is a simple parliamentary procedure which originated in the 1970s at a housing cooperative in Madison, Wisconsin. Martha's was at the time the name of a house for students and low-income people in the Madison Community Cooperative.

The initial version was a paper titled "Suggestions for Harmonious Meetings". The Madison Community Cooperative also has a more complicated recent published version for its own use.

Generally the process is:

- Proposals are drafted before the meeting in a standard format, distributed to participants and read before the meeting.
- Proponents introduce the proposal.
- A sense of the group is taken with thumbs up as "like", thumbs down representing "uncomfortable", and thumbs to the side representing "could live with".
- The sense determines whether a formal vote happens immediately (mostly likes), the proposal is sent back to be reworked (uncomfortable), or if it's discussed for 10 minutes (some uncomfortable).
- The majority can decide to overrule the objections of the minority.
