= Mass meeting =

Type of deliberative assembly

In parliamentary law, a mass meeting is a type of deliberative assembly or popular assembly, which in a publicized or selectively distributed notice known as the call of the meeting - has been announced:

- as called to take appropriate action on a particular problem or toward a particular purpose stated by the meeting's sponsors, and
- as open to everyone interested in the stated problem or purpose (or to everyone within a specified sector of the population thus interested).

== Participants ==
To the extent that persons in the invited category are clearly identifiable - as, for example, registered voters of a particular political party, or residents of a certain area - only such persons have the right to make motions, to speak, and to vote at the meeting, and none others need be admitted if the sponsors so choose. Attendees at a mass meeting are there under the implied understanding that the sponsors (who have engaged the hall and assumed the expenses of promoting the meeting) have the right to have the proceedings confined to the overall object they have announced. The assembled group of persons who are attending has the right to determine the action to be taken in pursuit of the stated object. "Membership" consists of all persons in the invited category who attend. If no qualification was placed in the call of the meeting, anyone who attends is regarded as a member and has the same rights as members in other assemblies - to make motions, to speak in debate, and to vote.

== Organization ==
- Call of the meeting - The announcement of a mass meeting should specify the date, hour, and place of the meeting, its purpose, and who should attend.
- Advance Preparation - Sponsors calling for the mass meeting should decide:
  - whom they prefer for its chairman;
  - who shall call the meeting to order and nominate their choice of chairman;
  - who shall be nominated for secretary and by whom;
  - what rules-if any-shall be proposed for adoption; and
  - who shall make the initial talk explaining the purpose of the meeting.
- Opening of the Meeting - The election of a chair and a secretary should be done right after the meeting is called to order.
- Transactions in the Meeting
  - The purpose of the meeting is announced (usually by the secretary reading the call of the meeting.)
  - Resolutions are offered to accomplish the purpose of the meeting -- these may either be prepared in advance or a committee can be appointed to draft resolutions and to make a report back to the assembly.
- Adjournment - If a place and time are not set for the next meeting, adjournment dissolves the organization.

When it is desired to form a permanent society, the organizers proceed in much the same way as for a mass meeting, except that the meetings while the organization is being formed should usually be carefully limited to persons whose interest in the project is known. For this reason, it may be desirable to solicit attendance for these meetings by personal contact or by letter, rather than by public announcement. A series of meetings is usually held when organizing a permanent society.

== See also ==
- Popular assembly
