= Morin code =

Text on parliamentary procedure used in Quebec

The Code Morin is the text Procédures des assemblées délibérantes, first published in 1938 by Victor Morin.

The code details procedures for organizational meetings, and was inspired by Robert's Rules of Order. It is the principal procedural code used in Quebec and in the francophone regions of New Brunswick.

Many different aspects of the structure of meetings are discussed in the code, including how topics are presented, how meetings are started, and how to calculate a quorum. It also details who can force a vote to be made, and who can present objections to the process of the meeting.
