= Victor Morin =

Canadian notary and politician

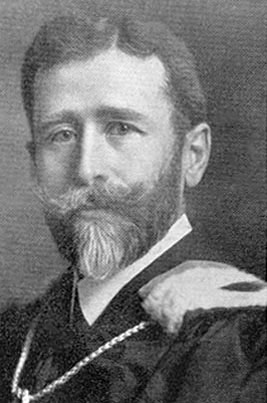
- Born: August 15, 1865; Saint-Hyacinthe, Canada East
- Died: September 30, 1960 (aged 95); Montreal, Quebec
- Occupations: notary, politician, writer

Victor Morin (August 15, 1865 – September 30, 1960) was a Canadian notary, politician, and writer.

Born in Saint-Hyacinthe, Canada East, Morin studied at the Université Laval de Montréal. In 1890, he started working as a notary in his uncle's firm Papineau & Marin. He would practice his profession for the next 72 years.

In 1910, he was elected to Montreal City Council for the Centre (Vieux-Montréal) district.

From 1915 to 1924, he was president of the Saint-Jean-Baptiste Society. A Fellow of the Royal Society of Canada, he served as its president from 1938 to 1939.

He is the author of the Code Morin, a book of rules for conducting deliberative assemblies, used in Quebec and Acadia. Morin's rules are inspired by Robert's Rules of Order.

Professional and academic associations
Preceded by Archibald Gowanlock Huntsman	President of the Royal Society of Canada; 1938–1939	Succeeded by Henry Marshall Tory
