= Riddick's Rules of Procedure =

Book on parliamentary procedure

Riddick's Rules

Riddick's Rules of Procedure is a parliamentary authority - a book explaining the parliamentary procedure, including the rules, ethics, and customs governing meetings and other operations of the United States Senate. It was written by Floyd M. Riddick and co-authored by Miriam Butcher. The book is based on Riddick's experience as parliamentarian of the Senate as well as the procedures of assemblies using parliamentary manuals such as Robert's Rules of Order, and is arranged in a glossary style.

Riddick's Rules is a book of common parliamentary usage for civic clubs and organizations. Riddick also wrote Riddick's Senate Procedure that contains contemporary precedents and practices of the US Senate and is still being updated and used by the Senate. Riddick was associated with the American Institute of Parliamentarians (AIP) where he founded an annual Practicum (to study parliamentary procedure) that now bears his name. His book has been used by AIP in its teachings, workshops, and materials.

== Editions ==
- Riddick, Floyd M.; Butcher, Miriam H. (1991), Riddick's rules of procedure : a modern guide to faster and more efficient meetings, Lanham, Md.: Madison Books, ISBN 978-0-8191-8064-3
- Riddick, Floyd M.; Butcher, Miriam H. (1985), Riddick's rules of procedure : a modern guide to faster and more efficient meetings, New York: Scribner, ISBN 978-0-684-18427-2
