= Majority =

Subset consisting of more than half of the set's elements

A majority is more than half of a total; however, the term is commonly used with other meanings, as explained in the "Related terms" section below.

It is a subset of a set consisting of more than half of the set's elements. For example, if a group consists of 31 individuals, a majority would be 16 or more individuals, while having 15 or fewer individuals would not constitute a majority.

A majority is different from, but often confused with, a plurality (or relative majority in British English), which is a subset larger than any other subset but not necessarily more than half the set. See the "Related terms" section below for details.

== Majority vote ==
In parliamentary procedure, a majority always means precisely "more than half". Other common definitions (e.g. the frequent 50%+1) may be misleading (see "Common errors" below).

Depending on the parliamentary authority used, there may be a difference in the total that is used to calculate a majority vote due to spoiled votes. Comparing the two most popular authorities in the United States: In Robert's Rules of Order Newly Revised (abbreviated RONR), spoiled votes are counted as votes cast, but are not credited to any candidate. In The Standard Code of Parliamentary Procedure (abbreviated TSC), spoiled votes are not included in the total and a majority vote is defined as being more than half of all eligible votes cast.

As it relates to a vote, a majority vote most often means a simple majority vote, which means more "yes" votes than "no" votes. Abstentions or blanks are excluded in calculating a simple majority vote. Also, the totals do not include votes cast by someone not entitled to vote or improper multiple votes by a single member.

=== Related terms ===
Other related terms containing the word "majority" have their own meanings, which may sometimes be inconsistent in usage.

In British English, the term "majority" is used to mean the difference in votes between the first-place candidate in an election and the second-place candidate. The word "majority", and the phrases "size of a majority", "overall majority", or "working majority", are also used to mean the difference between the number of votes gained by the winning party or candidate and the total votes gained by all other parties or candidates. In American English, "majority" does not have this meaning; the phrase margin of victory, i.e. the number of votes separating the first-place finisher from the second-place finisher, is typically used.

A "double majority" is a voting system which requires a majority of votes according to two separate criteria. e.g. in the European Union, the Council uses a double majority rule, requiring 55% of member states, representing at least 65% of the total EU population in favor. In some cases, the required percentage of member states in favor is increased to 72%.

A "supermajority" is a specified threshold greater than one half. A common use of a supermajority is a "two-thirds vote", which is sometimes referred to as a "two-thirds majority".

A "plurality" or "relative majority" is achieved when a candidate or other option polls more votes than any other but does not receive more than half of all votes cast. For example, if there is a group with 20 members which is divided into subgroups with 9, 6, and 5 members, then the 9-member group would be the plurality, but would not be a majority (as they have less than eleven members).

=== Voting basis ===
The voting basis refers to the set of members considered when calculating whether a proposal has a majority, i.e. the denominator used in calculating the percent support for a vote. Common voting bases include:

- Members present and voting: Members who cast a vote. Often called a simple majority, and excludes abstentions.
  - If 30 members were at a meeting, but only 20 votes were cast, a majority of members present and voting would be 11 votes.

- Members present: All members present at a meeting, including those who do not vote or abstain. Often called an absolute majority.
  - If 30 members were at a meeting, a majority of the members present would be 16. In any situation which specifies such a requirement for a vote, an abstention would have the same effect as a "no" vote.
- Entire membership: all the members of a body, including those absent and those present but not voting. In practical terms, it means an absence or an abstention from voting is equivalent to a "no" vote. It may be contrasted with a majority vote which only requires more than half of those actually voting to approve a proposition for it to be enacted
  - By way of illustration, in February 2007 the Italian Government fell after it lost a vote in the Italian Senate by 158 votes to 136 (with 24 abstentions). The government needed an absolute majority in the 318-member house but fell two votes short of the required 160 when two of its own supporters abstained.
  - Within German politics, the Kanzlermehrheit (Chancellor majority) to elect the Chancellery of Germany is specified as requiring a majority of elected members of the Bundestag, rather than a majority of those present.
- Fixed membership: the official, theoretical size of the full deliberative assembly. It is used only when a specific number of seats or memberships is established in the rules governing the organization. A majority of the fixed membership would be different from a majority of the entire membership if there are vacancies.
  - For example, say a board has 13 seats. If the board has the maximum number of members, or 13 members, a majority of the entire membership and a majority of the fixed membership would be seven members. However, if there are two vacancies (so that there are only eleven members on the board), then a majority of the entire membership would be six members (more than half of eleven), but a majority of the fixed membership would still be seven members.

== Examples ==
For example, assume that votes are cast for three people for an office: Alice, Bob, and Carol. In all three scenarios, Alice receives a plurality, or the most votes among the candidates, but in some she does not receive a majority.

=== Scenario 1 ===
| Candidate | Votes |
|---|---|
| Alice | 14 |
| Bob | 4 |
| Carol | 2 |
| Total | 20 |

In Scenario 1, Alice received a majority of the vote. There were 20 votes cast and Alice received more than half of them.

=== Scenario 2 ===
| Candidate | Votes |
|---|---|
| Alice | 10 |
| Bob | 6 |
| Carol | 4 |
| Total | 20 |

In Scenario 2, assume all three candidates are eligible. In this case, no one received a majority of the vote.

=== Scenario 3 ===
| Candidate | Votes |
|---|---|
| Alice | 10 |
| Bob | 6 |
| Carol (ineligible) | 4 |
| Total | 20 |

In Scenario 3, assume that Alice and Bob are eligible candidates, but Carol is not. Using Robert's Rules of Order, no one received a majority vote, which is the same as Scenario 2. In this case, the 4 votes for Carol are counted in the total, but are not credited to Carol (which precludes the possibility of an ineligible candidate being credited with receiving a majority vote). However, using The Standard Code, Alice received a majority vote since only votes for eligible candidates are counted. In this case, there are 16 votes for eligible candidates and Alice received more than half of those 16 votes.

== Temporary majority ==
A temporary majority exists when the positions of the members present and voting in a meeting of a deliberative assembly on a subject are not representative of the membership as a whole. Parliamentary procedure contains some provisions designed to protect against a temporary majority violating the rights of absentees. For instance, previous notice is typically required to rescind, repeal or annul something previously adopted by a majority vote. However, in this and many other cases, previous notice is not required if a majority of the entire membership votes in favor, because that indicates that it is clearly not a temporary majority. Another protection against a decision being made by a temporary majority is the motion to reconsider and enter on the minutes, by which two members can suspend action on a measure until it is called up at a meeting on another day.

== Common errors ==
The expression "at least 50% +1" may mislead when "majority" is actually intended, where the total number referred to is odd. For example, say a board has 7 members. "Majority" means "at least 4" in this case (more than half of 7, which is 3.5). But 50% + 1 is 4.5, and since a number of people can only be a positive integer, "at least 50% + 1" could be interpreted as meaning "at least 5". Adapting the expression to "at least 50% +½" would make it mathematically correct.

== See also ==
- Majoritarianism
- Majority function
- Majority rule
- Silent majority
- Voting system
- Age of majority
