= Paul Mason (writer) =

American writer (1898–1985)

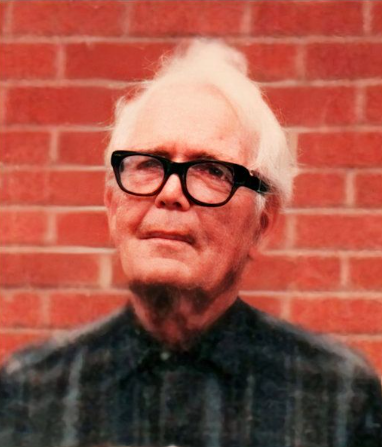
- Mason
- Born: May 12, 1898
- Died: October 19, 1985 (aged 87)
- Occupations: Writer, parliamentarian, historian
- Known for: Mason's Manual of Legislative Procedure

Paul Mason (1898–1985) was an American writer, parliamentarian, historian, and assistant Secretary of the California State Senate in the first half of the 20th century. Mason wrote the first edition of Mason's Manual of Legislative Procedure in 1935.

== Early life ==
Mason was born in Idaho and was educated in Idaho and Utah. His education was interrupted in 1918 by enlisting in infantry officer training. After the war, Mason received a bachelor's degree in 1920 and later attended Stanford University, where he submitted a thesis on Procedure in the California Legislature, and was granted master's degree in political science in 1923. He was admitted to the State Bar of California in September 1923, and entered private law practice for a time. Mason served as assistant Minute Clerk and File Clerk in the Senate in 1923 and as the Assistant Legislative Counsel in the 1925 and 1927 Sessions. Mason later served as Chief Assistant Secretary of the Senate until 1931, when he became Parliamentarian.

== Professional career ==
Paul Mason served for many years in California government: Chief Assistant Secretary of the California Senate (1929–32); Chief, Division of Driver's Licenses (1937–53); Director of Motor Vehicles (1954–58); and Legislative Secretary to California Governor Goodwin Knight (1954–58). Mason is known primarily for two published works: The Constitutional History of California and the Manual of Legislative Procedure.

According to the National Conference of State Legislatures (NCSL), Mason's Manual has become the most widely used legislative procedure guide in the U.S., currently in use by 77 of the 99 state legislative bodies in the United States.

Before Mason's death in 1985, he assigned the copyright of his manual to the NCSL. The book is edited by an NCSL commission every few years to keep it up-to-date with the latest legal precedents.

Mason's other seminal work was his Constitutional History of California. In this essay, Mason examines the Spanish alcalde origins of California's legal system, through the Mexican era, up through the framing of the Constitutions of 1849 and 1879.

In the California Senate, Mason served for many years under longtime Secretary of the Senate Joseph Beek.
