= Good standing =

Having no obligations or able to exercise benefits of membership

A person or organization in good standing is regarded as having no financial obligations. A business entity that is in good standing has unabated powers to conduct its activities, which can include business endeavors. Similarly, a person who is in good standing within an organization or educational institution may take advantage of the benefits of membership or enrollment.

== In business ==
=== United States ===
In the USA, a business entity which is either registered with or chartered by a government agency such as a corporation, limited liability company, limited partnership, limited liability partnership, or limited liability limited partnership is said to be in good standing if it has filed and continued to file all appropriate paperwork with the government agency which provides its charter, and has paid all fees which are due for its charter or the renewal thereof. When an entity is in good standing with the chartering agency, it may obtain a "certificate of good standing" which indicates this to be the case.

In some cases, a bank may require an entity wanting to open an account such as a checking or savings account to show a certificate of good standing from the chartering agency. Also, a corporation or other limited liability entity wishing to register in another jurisdiction as a foreign corporation (or foreign limited liability company, partnership, etc.) will have to provide to that jurisdiction a copy of a certificate of good standing from its home jurisdiction to be able to register in the new jurisdiction.

Note that being in "good standing" simply means the entity has kept all paperwork related to its charter and yearly renewal up to date and that all fees have been paid. It is possible for a corporation or limited liability entity to be simultaneously:

- involved in an investigation for labor law violations
- subjected to an audit for unpaid payroll. unemployment, and/or trust-fund taxes
- having its property seized for unpaid state and federal income taxes
- delinquent on its property taxes
- convicted of multiple felony crimes
- under suspicion for securities fraud
- in bankruptcy
- being sued for causing people to die due to its products being defective, and
- have the entire board of directors indicted for suspected criminal behavior

As long as the paperwork and fees are current with the chartering authority, the entity will still be in "good standing."

=== United Kingdom ===
In the United Kingdom, Certificates of Good Standing are issued by Companies House to confirm the continuous existence of a company since incorporation and the absence of any pending action to remove the company from the register of companies. This can either be to allow a company to conduct business abroad (by ensuring other regulatory agencies are satisfied that the company has complied with applicable requirements) or to provide further guarantee to lenders or other parties entering into financial agreements.

== Membership organizations ==
In membership organizations, or voluntary associations, there may be criteria for becoming a member and maintaining membership. Such criteria may include payment of dues or attendance of meetings. Failure to meet these criteria may result in loss of "good standing" within the organization or loss of membership in the organization altogether. Unless the organization defines "good standing" and what causes a member to lose good standing, a member has all the rights of membership even if in arrears in payment of dues.

== Documentation ==
In some cases, good standing will be used as a criterion to help prevent fraudulent applications for important documents. For instance, when applying for a British passport, your application must be countersigned by a personal acquaintance who "has ‘good standing’ in your community".
