= Alice Sturgis =

Academic background
- Education: University of California; Stanford University

Academic work
- Notable works: Sturgis Standard Code of Parliamentary Procedure

Alice Sturgis (1885–1974) was an author and parliamentarian, best known for writing the Sturgis Standard Code of Parliamentary Procedure. She was a practicing parliamentarian and consultant to national and international professional and business organizations. She taught at Stanford University and the University of California.

After her death, the American Institute of Parliamentarians took over the preparation of new revisions to the Standard Code. Her name was removed from the title of the book at that time, but she remains listed as an author of the current edition. The book is the parliamentary authority for many organizations, especially in the fields of medicine, education, and libraries.

== Editions of the Standard Code ==
- 1st edition, Sturgis Standard Code of Parliamentary Procedure, 1950
- 2nd edition, Sturgis Standard Code of Parliamentary Procedure, 1966
- 3rd edition HB, Standard Code of Parliamentary Procedure, 1988
- 3rd edition PB, The Standard Code of Parliamentary Procedure, 1993
- 4th edition, The Standard Code of Parliamentary Procedure, 2001
- 1st edition, American Institute of Parliamentarians Standard Code of Parliamentary Procedure, 2012
- 2nd edition, American Institute of Parliamentarians Standard Code of Parliamentary Procedure, 2023

== Other works ==
- Textbook on Parliamentary Law, 1923, The Macmillan Company, with Alta B. Hall
- Learning Parliamentary Procedure, 1953, McGraw-Hill
- Your Farm Bureau, 1958, McGraw-Hill
