= George Demeter =

Greek American politician and parliamentarian

- Born: March 13, 1896; Athens, Greece
- Died: 1983 (aged 86–87)
- Education: Harvard College 1918, Boston University Law School 1924
- Occupations: Lawyer; Parliamentarian

George Demeter (/dɪˈmiːtər/; 1896–1983) was a Greek American politician, professor of law, and parliamentarian. He was the author of Demeter's Manual of Parliamentary Law and Procedure. The second Wednesday in April has been designated as George Demeter Day in Massachusetts.

== Political involvement ==
Demeter served in the Massachusetts House of Representatives for two terms in 1932 and 1934 representing the Back Bay district. Demeter was the first Greek-American to serve in the Massachusetts House of Representatives, building on the unsuccessful bid of Greek-American Nicholas G. Veniopoulos Nestor in 1922, who had gained the Republican nomination.

== Greek–American involvement ==
Demeter became involved with the national Greek-American service organization AHEPA soon after it was founded on July 26, 1922. He was President of the Boston Lodge in 1923. After Supreme President H. N. Wells was voted out of office in March 1924, he assumed the role of Supreme President of AHEPA for three months.

While serving as Supreme President he contributed an editorial to the 1924 convention edition of "The Ahepa" entitled "Why Greek Organizations Fail!" Sometime during this period between 1920 and 1940, Demeter was president of the Annunciation Greek Orthodox Cathedral of New England. At the 27th Supreme Convention in 1949, AHEPA adopted Demeter's Manual of Parliamentary Law and Procedure for its own use. Demeter continued to be active in AHEPA as a Past Supreme President. He participated in at least the 47th Supreme Convention in 1969.

Demeter was involved in the decision to include the Greek traditions of a laurel wreath and bronze medal in the Boston Marathon. He crowned the winner of each race and gave them a medal from Greece for each marathon from 1931 to 1947.

== Academic work ==
Demeter was a professor of law at both Boston University and Suffolk University. He also instructed new members of the Massachusetts Legislature in legislative procedure.

== Works ==
- Demeter's Manual of Parliamentary Law and Procedure, 2nd edition, 1949
- Demeter's Manual of Parliamentary Law and Procedure, 3rd revised edition, 1950, Bostonia Press.
- Demeter's Manual of Parliamentary Law and Procedure, Universal edition, 1953, Bostonia Press.
- Demeter's Manual of Parliamentary Law and Procedure, Universal Revised, 1961, Bostonia Press.
- Demeter's Manual of Parliamentary Law and Procedure, Blue Book edition, 1969, Little, Brown and Company.
- How to Master the Rules of Parliamentary Law and Procedure, 1948, Mosher Press.
- Main Motion, 3rd edition, 1943, Bostonia
- Master Parliamentarian, 1948, Bostonia
- Parliamentary Procedure for Boy's State, 1949, Bostonia
- Parliamentary Procedure for Girl's State, 4th edition, 1942, Bostonia
- Ahepa Manual: Official Guide of the Order of Ahepa, Containing Early History and Miscellaneous Fundamentals of the Order, 1926, Boston: Athens Print. Co.
