= Demeter's Manual of Parliamentary Law and Procedure =

Parliamentary authority manual by George Demeter

Demeter's Manual

Demeter's Manual of Parliamentary Law and Procedure is a parliamentary authority manual by George Demeter. It is included in the bank of study materials used in preparing for the Certified Parliamentarian (CP) designation offered by the American Institute of Parliamentarians. Similar to Robert's Rules of Order, Demeter's Manual notes, "Without rules, there would be injustice and confusion. Hence, it is as necessary to follow the rules of parliamentary law as it is to follow the rules of a ball game or a card game." The book attempts to include everything a presiding officer might need to know, including public courtesies and ceremonies; sample prayers for opening a meeting; organizing a new lodge, chapter or post; times of fraction and discord; acquisition of new members; installation of officers; and adjournment. Chapter 16 contains an "entire meeting in drill form," designed to illustrate a range of parliamentary motions and situations and how a chairman would handle them. Demeter also devotes space to discussing strategic use of parliamentary procedure. The book concludes with "The Greatest Convention Ever Held", an account of the Creation in parliamentary terms.

== Editions ==
- Demeter's Manual of Parliamentary Law and Procedure, 2nd edition, 1949
- Demeter's Manual of Parliamentary Law and Procedure, 3rd revised edition, 1950, Bostonia Press.
- Demeter's Manual of Parliamentary Law and Procedure, Universal edition, 1953, Bostonia Press.
- Demeter's Manual of Parliamentary Law and Procedure, Universal Revised, 1961, Bostonia Press.
- Demeter's Manual of Parliamentary Law and Procedure, Blue Book edition, 1969, Little, Brown and Company.
