= Standing rule =

Parliamentary procedure for internal use

A standing rule is a rule that relates to the details of the administration of a society and which can be adopted or changed the same way as any other act of the deliberative assembly. Standing rules can be suspended by a majority vote for the duration of the session, but not for longer. Examples of standing rules include wearing name badges, signing a guest register, or using recording devices.
