= Mason's Manual of Legislative Procedure =

Parliamentary authority

- Cover of 2000 edition
- Author: Paul Mason
- Language: English
- Subject: Parliamentary procedure
- Publisher: National Conference of State Legislatures
- Publication place: United States
- Media type: Print and online digital
- Pages: 752
- ISBN: 9781580249744
- Website: www.ncsl.org/about-state-legislatures/masons-manual-2020-edition

Mason's Manual of Legislative Procedure, referred to as Mason's Manual, is the official parliamentary authority of most state legislatures in the United States. The Manual covers motions, procedures, vote requirements, the rules of order, principles, precedents, and legal basis behind parliamentary law used by legislatures.

The author, Paul Mason (1898–1985), was a scholar who worked for the California State Senate. He is best known for writing Constitutional History of California in 1951 and Manual of Legislative Procedure in 1935. The National Conference of State Legislatures (NCSL) was assigned copyright ownership by Mason prior to his death.

The NCSL assigned the American Society of Legislative Clerks and Secretaries (ASLCS) the task of editing and maintaining the manual for future printings. In 1984, the ASLCS created the Mason's Manual Revision Commission consisting of ASLCS members. It is responsible for editing and revising the manual to keep pace with the modern challenges and developments in parliamentary procedures.

The most recent edition is the 2020 edition.
