= Parliamentary procedure =

Guidelines to conduct meetings

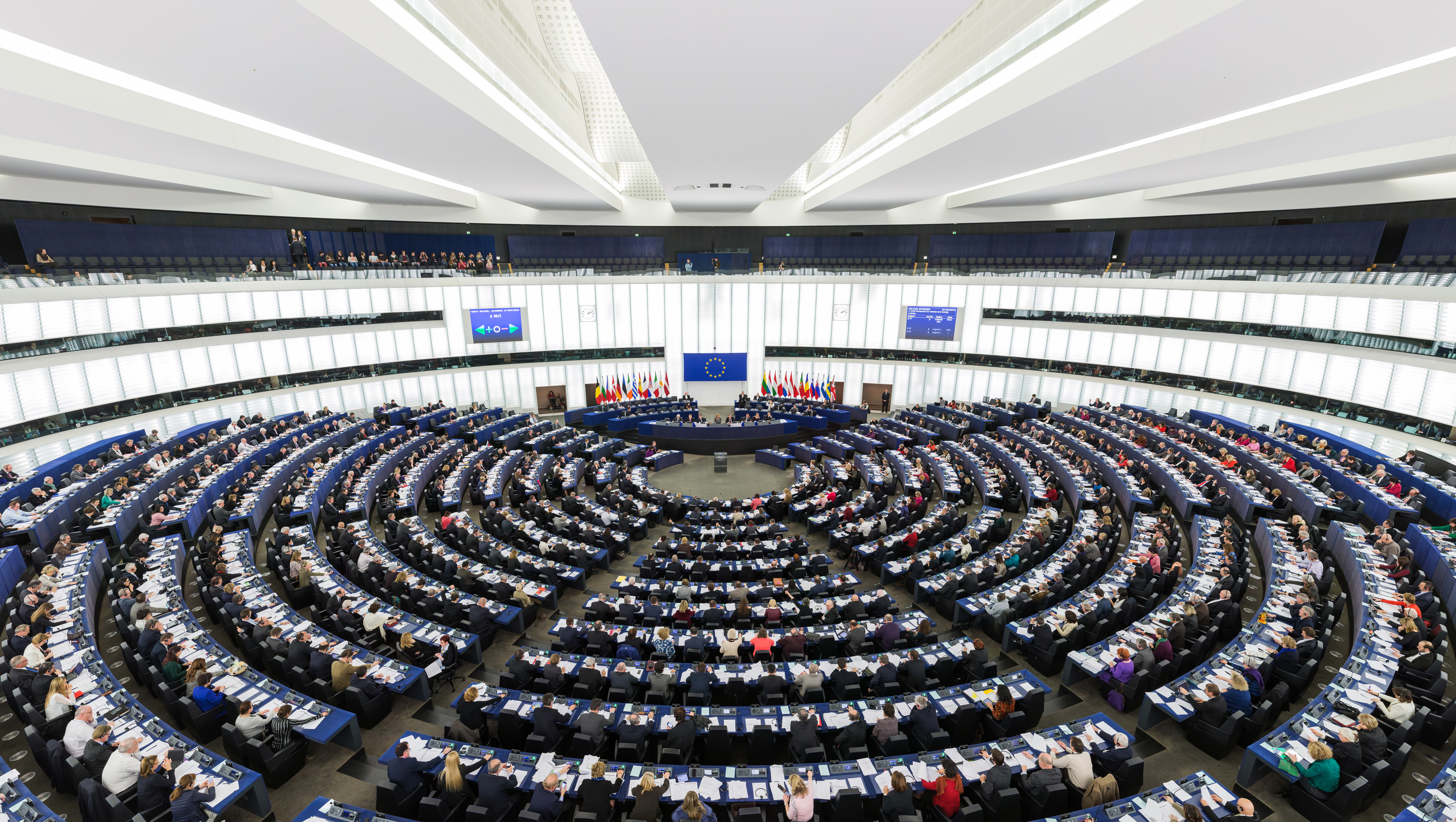
The European Parliament during a plenary session in 2014

Parliamentary procedures are the accepted rules, ethics, and customs governing meetings of an assembly or organization. Their object is to allow orderly deliberation upon questions of interest to the organization and thus to arrive at the sense or the will of the majority of the assembly upon these questions. Self-governing organizations follow parliamentary procedure to debate and reach group decisions, usually by vote, with the least possible friction.

In the United Kingdom, Canada, Ireland, Australia, New Zealand, South Africa, and other English-speaking countries, parliamentary procedure is often called chairmanship, chairing, the law of meetings, procedure at meetings, the conduct of meetings, or the standing orders. Erskine May's Parliamentary Practice is used and often referred to as "Erskine May" in the United Kingdom, and influential in other countries that use the Westminster system. In the United States, terms used are parliamentary law, parliamentary practice, legislative procedure, rules of order, or Robert's Rules of Order.

Rules of order consist of rules written by the body itself (often referred to as bylaws), usually supplemented by a published parliamentary authority adopted by the body. Typically, national, state, or provincial, and other full-scale legislative assemblies have extensive internally-written rules of order, whereas non-legislative bodies write and adopt a limited set of specific rules as the need arises.

== Principles ==
General principles of parliamentary procedure include rule of the majority with respect for the minority, member rights, one question at a time, one vote per person, only members present can vote, changing action previously decided on, following own specific rules, absentee members rights, nonmembers rights. The purpose of parliamentary procedure is for the assembly to conduct its businesses in the most efficient way possible while protecting the rights of its members.

== History ==
The term parliamentary procedure gets its name from its use in the parliamentary system of government.

In 1377, the parliaments of England started naming the coordinator of parliamentary meetings as the Speaker. In the 16th and 17th century, they began adopting rules of order. In the 1560s, Sir Thomas Smyth began the process of writing down accepted procedures and published a book about them for the House of Commons in 1583. Early rules included:

- One subject should be discussed at a time (adopted 1581)
- Personal attacks are to be avoided in debate (1604)
- Debate must be limited to the merits of the question (1610)
- Division of a question into parts to be voted on separately (1640)

=== Westminster procedures ===
The Westminster parliamentary procedures are followed in several Commonwealth countries, including the United Kingdom, Canada, Australia, New Zealand, India, and South Africa, as well as in the Republic of Ireland.

In Canada, for example, the House of Commons uses House of Commons Procedure and Practice as its primary procedural authority. Others include Arthur Beauchesne's Parliamentary Rules and Forms of the House of Commons of Canada, Sir John George Bourinot's Parliamentary Procedure and Practice in the Dominion of Canada, and Erskine May's The Law, Privileges, Proceedings and Usage of Parliament from Britain.

=== American procedures ===
The rules of the United States Congress were developed from parliamentary procedures used in Britain. Many nations' legislatures follow American parliamentary procedure, including Indonesia, the Philippines, Mexico and South Korea.

=== Other ===
The Treaty on the Functioning of the European Union (1957) states that each of the European Parliament, Council of the European Union, and European Commission adopt their own rules. For the Parliament, these are the Rules of Procedure of the European Parliament.

The procedures of the Diet of Japan moved away from the British parliamentary model, when in Occupied Japan, there were efforts to align Japanese parliamentary procedures with American congressional practices. In Japan, informal negotiations are more important than formal procedures.

In Italy, written rules govern the Houses of the Parliament. The Constitutional Court has adjudicated on the limits beyond which these regulations cannot go (judgement n. 120 of 2014) and on their bad application when a law is passed.

== Parliamentary authority usage patterns ==
Parliamentary procedure is based on the principles of allowing the majority to make decisions effectively and efficiently (majority rule), while ensuring fairness towards the minority and giving each member or delegate the right to voice an opinion. Voting determines the will of the assembly. While each assembly may create their own set of rules, these sets tend to be more alike than different. A common practice is to adopt a standard reference book on parliamentary procedure and modify it through special rules of order that supersede the adopted authority.

A parliamentary structure conducts business through motions, which cause actions. Members bring business before the assembly by introducing main motions. "Members use subsidiary motions to alter a main motion, or delay or hasten its consideration." Parliamentary procedure also allows for rules in regards to nomination, voting, debate, disciplinary action, appeals, and the drafting of organization charters, constitutions, and bylaws.

=== Organizations and civic groups ===
In the US Robert's Rules of Order Newly Revised aspires to be a comprehensive guide, based on the original 1876 version written primarily to help guide voluntary associations in their operations of governance: "New editions have marked the growth of parliamentary procedure as cases occurring in assemblies have pointed to a need for further rules or additional interpretations to go by." Robert's Rules of Order The Modern Edition and The Standard Code of Parliamentary Procedure aspire to be concise. "This book is a basic reference book but does not claim to be comprehensive. For most organization and for most meetings, it will prove very adequate." "Alice Sturgis believed that confusing or unnecessary motions and terminology should be eliminated. Her goal was to make the process simpler, fairer, and easier to understand, and The Standard Code of Parliamentary Procedure did just that ..."

A common text in use in the UK, particularly within trade unions, is Walter Citrine's ABC of Chairmanship.

In English-speaking Canada, popular authorities include Kerr & King's Procedures for Meeting and Organizations. The Conservative Party of Canada uses Wainberg's Society meetings including rules of order to run its internal affairs.

In French-speaking Canada, commonly used rules of order for ordinary societies include Victor Morin's Procédures des assemblées délibérantes (commonly known as the Code Morin) and the Code Confédération des syndicats nationaux.

=== Legislatures ===
Legislative assemblies in all countries, because of their nature, tend to have a specialized set of rules that differ from parliamentary procedure used by clubs and organizations.

In the United Kingdom, Erskine May's Parliamentary Practice (frequently updated; originally Treatise on the Law, Privileges, Proceedings and Usage of Parliament; often referred to simply as Erskine May) is the accepted authority on the powers and procedures of the Westminster parliament. There are also the Standing Orders for each House.

Of the 99 state legislative chambers in the United States (two for each state except Nebraska, which has a unicameral legislature), Mason's Manual of Legislative Procedure governs parliamentary procedures in 70; Jefferson's Manual governs 13, and Robert's Rules of Order governs four. The United States Senate follows the Standing Rules of the United States Senate, while the United States House of Representatives follows Jefferson's Manual.

Mason's Manual, originally written by constitutional scholar and former assistant secretary of the California Senate Paul Mason in 1935, and since his death revised and published by the National Conference of State Legislatures (NCSL), governs legislative procedures in instances where the state constitution, state statutes, and the chamber's rules are silent.

== Parliamentarians in the United States ==
In the United States, individuals who are proficient in parliamentary procedure are called parliamentarians. This is in contrast to countries with parliamentary legislatures, where the term refers to a member of parliament.

Several organizations offer certification programs for parliamentarians, including the National Association of Parliamentarians and American Institute of Parliamentarians. Agriculture teachers who coach teams in the parliamentary procedure contest of the National FFA Organization (formerly Future Farmers of America) can earn the title accredited parliamentarian. parliamentarians perform an important role in many meetings, including counselling organizations on parliamentary law, holding elections, or writing amendments to the constitution and bylaws of an organization.

== Parliamentarians in the Republic of Ireland ==
Dáil Éireann follows standing orders originally adopted on 11 September 1922.

== Role in democratic backsliding and resilience ==
In the early twenty-first century, some ways of using parliamentary procedure, such as fast-tracking, were found to play a role in democratic backsliding. Methods of making parliamentary procedure more resilient against backsliding, such as protecting some fundamental procedures against fast-tracking, were proposed.

== See also ==
- Filibuster
- Group decision-making
- Lawmaking procedure in India
- Obstructionism
- Parliamentary procedure in the corporate world
