= Antiques Roadshow (series 30) =

Antiques Roadshow is a British television series produced by the BBC since 1979. Series 30 (2007/08) comprised 27 editions that were broadcast by the BBC from 2 September 2007 – 30 March 2008

The dates in brackets given below are the dates each episode was filmed at the location. The date not in brackets is the episode's first UK airing date on BBC One.

Series / Episode Aired (Recorded)	Location & Regionp	Host & Experts	Notes
30/1; 2/9/2007 (24 May 2007)	The Courtyard Centre for the Arts; Hereford	Michael Aspel &	– 16th century chair – Renaissance plate
30/2; 9/9/2007	Arundel Castle; Arundel	Michael Aspel &	–
30/3; 16/9/2007 (10 July 2007)	Alnwick Castle; Alnwick	Michael Aspel &	– a £20K plate from the time of Samuel Pepys, – a crystal radio concealed inside a water bottle by a Prisoner of War – Oliver Cromwell's nightcap
30/4; 23/9/2007 (27 May 2007)	Burleigh Pottery; Last working Victorian pottery at Middleport; Staffordshire	Michael Aspel &	– portrait of William Gladstone – a pendant worth £500, – a pair of small rice bowls, value £15,000
30/5; 30/9/2007	Wills Memorial Building; Bristol	Michael Aspel &	– a despised hall clock worth £30-40K, – Cider mugs valued at £3K – primitive painting of Bristol's harbour
30/6; 7/10/2007 (21 June 2007)	Coventry Cathedral; Coventry	Michael Aspel &	– Henry Sandon values three flower pots at £8K – doodle of a famous artist is valued at £7K – relics from World War II
30/7; 14/10/2007	Banqueting House; Part 1 London	Michael Aspel &	– A "tatty" brooch discovered on a building site – a rare collection of photographs of the Russian royal family
30/8; 21/10/2007	Banqueting House; Part 2 London	Michael Aspel &	– An inheritance of old pots – a grisly tale of an axe from the tower of London. –
30/9; 28/10/2007 (14 June 2007)	Highcliffe Castle; Christchurch, Dorset	Michael Aspel &	– letters from Noël Coward – a bust of the 18th century actress Sarah Siddons – Lady Penelope
30/10; 4/11/2007	Compilation episode	Michael Aspel &	– story of a watercolour purchased for two cigarettes in a World War II prisoner of war camp – a 20p boot sale buy pays dividends –
30/11; 11/11/2007	Lincolnshire Aviation Heritage Centre; East Kirkby; Part 1 Lincolnshire	Michael Aspel &	– wartime memories – Avro Lancaster bomber -
30/12; 18/11/2007	Lincolnshire Aviation Heritage Centre; East Kirkby; Part 2 Lincolnshire	Michael Aspel &	– A squadron of Morris Minors – a ring found in the roots of a tree –
30/13; 25/11/2007 (27 September 2007)	Exmouth Pavilion, Exmouth, Devon	Michael Aspel &	– a toy which belonged to Jane Austen – a collection of Native Canadian Cree embroidery. -
30/14; 2/12/2007 (6 June 2007)	Powis Castle, Welshpool, Powys; Wales	Michael Aspel &	– a Doctor Who Script – a broken piece of pottery –
30/15; 16/12/2007	Rochester Cathedral; Part 1, Rochester, Kent	Michael Aspel &	– a rare Scottish sword found behind a chimney – some delivery bicycles that are still in regular use. -
30/16; 23/12/2007	Rochester Cathedral; Part 2, Rochester, Kent	Michael Aspel &	– a drinking glass owned by Napoleon – early TV equipment. –
30/17; 30/12/2007 (21 July 2007)	De La Warr Pavilion; Part 1 Bexhill-on-Sea; East Sussex	Michael Aspel &	– a feast of colourful modern collectables – -
30/18; 6/1/2008 (7 July 2007)	Castle of Mey near Thurso, Scotland	Michael Aspel &	– a 'dog skin buoy from the Orkney Islands – a collection of Regency clothing fit for a Jane Austen period drama –
30/19; 13/1/2008 (4 November 2007)	St. George's Hall; Liverpool; Part 1	Michael Aspel &	– –
30/20; 20/1/2008 (4 November 2007)	St. George's Hall; Liverpool; Part 2	Michael Aspel & Katherine Higgins; Hilary Kay; Bunny Campione	– W. S. Gilbert worked in Crown Court of [St. George's Hall – William Shakespeare image 'transfer printed' on a Jug, Liverpool porcelain made by John Sadler, 1770s, £3,000 – 1870s wardrobe in 'Reformed Gothic' stylr, decorated with inlaid ash, made by Charles Locke Eastlake £800 – blue and white Liverpool porcelain made by Seth Pennington, 1778–1799 Jug £400; Cans £150 each – pair of Sedan clocks, turned wooden bezel containing watch movement by 'George Paterson of London', 1810s, (sometimes spelled Patterson, born c.1778 Scotland), 1810s, £750 – 1960s vinyl handbag signed by John Lennon and Paul McCartney, £1,000 – painted wooden panel of Ducks and ducklings by James Bradley Junior Junior, 1881. Probably a commission because Bradley was a Royal Worcester porcelain artist who painted Blush ware. £4,000 – commemoration box of perfumes, oils and soaps, given to 'civic dignitaries' at the opening of the Mersey Tunnel, possibly the Kingsway Tunnel in 1971. – Balloon mail from the Siege of Paris (1870-1871), describing conditions, £200-£500 – book of Life of a Slave in Georgia 1855, £100 – graphic art by Scottie Wilson (born Louis Freeman). His exemplary Outsider art was owned by Picasso and Jean Dubuffet. £2,000 – Collection of Barbie dolls. £10,000 – 1920s toy car by Johann Distler of Nuremberg. £3,000 – collection of 'Black memorabilia' from 17th century to contemporary. Including 1830s painting, emancipation medal, porcelain Golliwogg and World War II soldiers. – ornate 'General Officer' sword and solid silver scabbard made by Wilkinson Sword. Presented to Robert Baden-Powell, 1st Baron Baden-Powell by the people of Liverpool to celebrate the Siege of Mafeking. £15,000
30/21; 27/1/2008 (13 September 2007)	Kentwell Hall; Long Melford; Suffolk	Michael Aspel &	– –
30/22; 3/2/2008 (6 September 2007)	De Montfort Hall, Leicester	Michael Aspel &	T.G.Green'Over the Hill Collection 1930. £1,000
30/23; 10/2/2008 (11 October 2007)	Coronation Hall, Ulverston; Cumbria	Michael Aspel &	– –
16/2/2008 ( )	Special: Sport Relief; Lord's Cricket Ground; London	Michael Aspel &	– –
30/24; 17/2/2008 (21 July 2007)	De La Warr Pavilion; Bexhill-on-Sea; East Sussex; Part 2	Michael Aspel &	– –
30/25; 2/3/2008 ( )	Sheffield City Hall, South Yorkshire	Michael Aspel &	– –
30/3/2008 ( )	Special: Farewell to Michael Aspel	Michael Aspel &	– –

== Series 30 (2007/08) ==
1. The Courtyard Centre for the Arts, Hereford – 2 September 2007 (24 May 2007)
2. Arundel Castle, West Sussex, England – 9 September 2007 (£2006)
3. Alnwick Castle, Northumberland – 16 September (10 July 2007)
4. Burleigh Pottery, Middleport, Stoke-on-Trent, Staffordshire – 23 September (27 May 2007)
5. Wills Memorial Building, Bristol – 30 September
6. Coventry Cathedral, Coventry – 7 October (21 June 2007)
7. Banqueting House Part 1, London – 14 October
8. Banqueting House Part 2, London – 21 October
9. Highcliffe Castle, near Christchurch, Dorset – 28 October (14 June 2007)
10. Compilation (unseen items from recent episodes) – 4 November
11. East Kirkby Aviation Centre Part 1, Lincolnshire Thursday – 11 November (2 August 2007)
12. East Kirkby Aviation Centre Part 2, Lincolnshire Thursday – 18 November (2 August 2007)
13. Exmouth Pavilion, Exmouth, Devon – 25 November (27 September 2007)
14. Powis Castle, near Welshpool, Powys, Wales – 2 December 2007 (6 June 2007)
15. Rochester Cathedral Part 1, Rochester, Kent – 16 December 2007
16. Rochester Cathedral Part 2, Rochester, Kent – 23 December 2007
17. De La Warr Pavilion Part 1, Bexhill-on-Sea, East Sussex – 30 December 2007 (21 July 2007)
18. Castle of Mey, near Thurso, Scotland – 6 January 2008 (7 July 2007)
19. St. George's Hall, Liverpool Part 1–13 January 2008 (4 November 2007)
20. St. George's Hall, Liverpool Part 2–20 January 2008 (4 November 2007)
21. Kentwell Hall, Long Melford, Suffolk – 27 January 2008 (13 September 2007)
22. De Montfort Hall, Leicester – 3 February 2008 (6 September 2007)
23. Coronation Hall, Ulverston, Cumbria – 10 February 2008 (11 October 2007)
24. De La Warr Pavilion Part 2, Bexhill-on-Sea, East Sussex – 17 February 2008 (21 July 2007)
25. Sheffield City Hall, South Yorkshire – 2 March 2008
26. Special: Sport Relief, Lord's Cricket Ground, London – 16 March 2008
27. Special: Farewell to Michael Aspel – 30 March 2008
