= Division bell (disambiguation) =

Division bell refers to Division bell, a bell rung in or around a parliament. It may also refer to:

- The Division Bell, a studio album by rock group Pink Floyd
  - The Division Bell Tour, a 1994 tour by Pink Floyd to support the album
