= Lowestoft Porcelain Factory =

English porcelain factory in operation 1757–1802

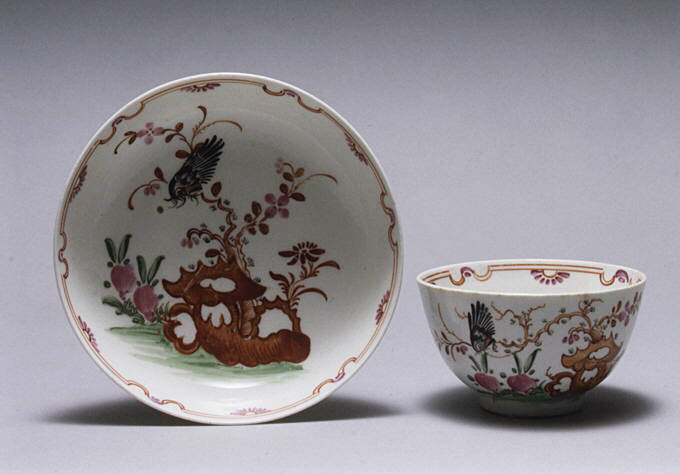
Teabowl and saucer, c. 1770, with a version of the "Redgrave" pattern

The Lowestoft Porcelain Factory was a soft-paste porcelain factory on Crown Street (then Bell Lane) in Lowestoft, Suffolk, England, which was active from 1757 to 1802. It mostly produced "useful wares" such as pots, teapots, and jugs, with shapes copied from silverwork or from Bow and Worcester porcelain. The factory, built on the site of an existing pottery or brick kiln, was later used as a brewery and malt kiln. Most of its remaining buildings were demolished in 1955.

Lowestoft collectors divide the factory's products into three distinct periods: Early Lowestoft c. 1756 – c. 1761, Middle-Period c. 1761 – c. 1768 and Late-Period c. 1768 to factory closure in 1802. All told, the factory was in production for longer than any English soft-paste porcelain producer other than Royal Worcester and Royal Crown Derby. Geographically, it was isolated from other porcelain factories, or indeed makers of fine earthenware, which probably accounts for a relatively slow-moving stylistic development. It was also relatively small, with a maximum workforce of about 70. Nonetheless, it survived longer than the average English factory, perhaps because it had less competition in the local market. The factory produced experimental wares in about 1756 and first advertised their porcelain in 1760. Although Lowestoft probably sold mainly to the local East Anglian market, by 1770 it had a warehouse, effectively a shop, in Cheapside, London.

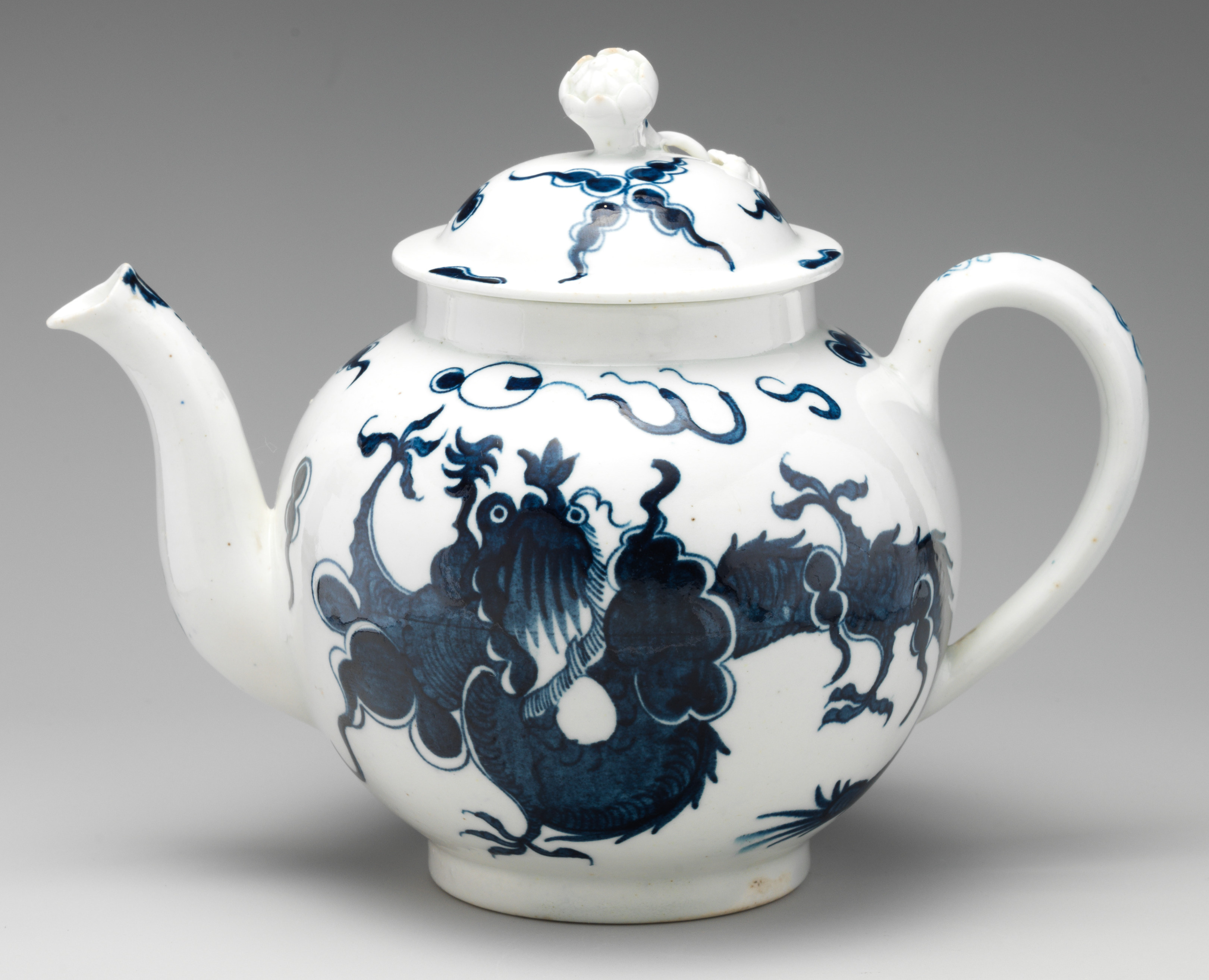
Teapot, c. 1770

During the early period wares decorated with Chinese-inspired scenes in underglaze blue were produced. This type of decoration continued to form the majority of production throughout the life of the factory but scenes were gradually simplified. Overglaze colours in enamel were used from about 1768, generally in white and blue or in a polychrome that utilizes a bright brick red. After 1770 transfer printing was used. Some figures were made, mostly in the 1780s, of musicians, putti, and animals, but these are all rare.

The Lowestoft body paste contained bone ash, and is similar to that of Bow; probably a former worker at Bow was employed when the factory began. Occasionally there can be difficulties telling the two apart, usually with blue and white pieces. The quality of the porcelain is not the highest, especially after 1770, but even the less polished pieces have "the appealling simplicity of folk art", and the high proportion of commemorative pieces, inscribed for people, places or occasions, add to their interest. Many such documentary pieces are dated which, together with the wasters excavated at the site in 1902 and 1967, has helped to build up a good picture of the factory's products.

== Common types ==
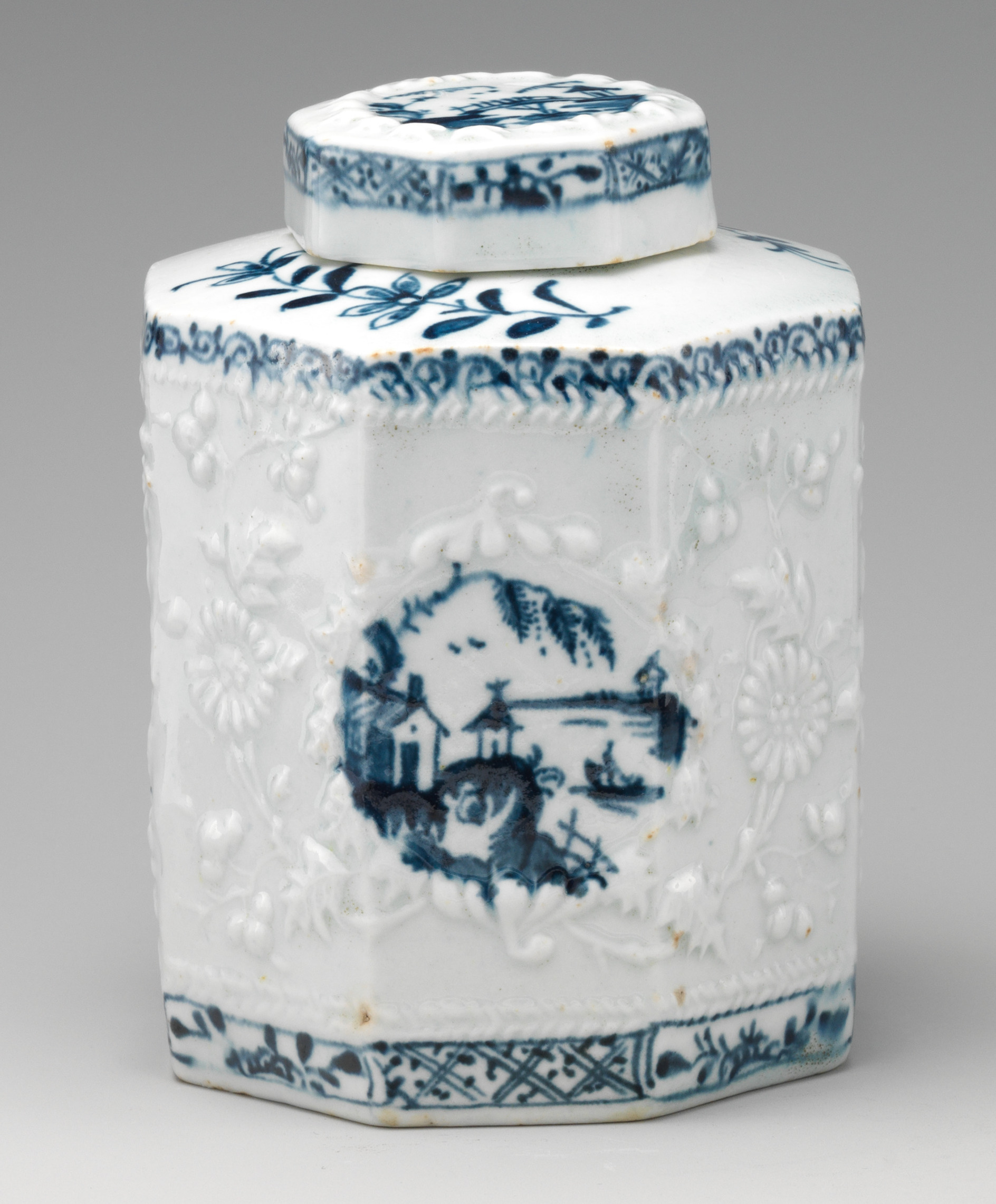
"Hughes-type" tea caddy, chinoiserie decoration, c. 1760

Many pieces are in a pattern, itself derived from Chinese models, known as "Redgrave" (after a family with several workers at the factory), with paeonies and rocks. This exists in several types, some with their own names such as "House pattern" and "Two-Bird pattern". Most combined underglaze blue with overglaze enamel decoration, as Chinese porcelain sometimes does.

Another group is called "Hughes-type", after James Hughes, a modeller. Most of the surface has moulded low relief with small and rather vague plant shapes, leaves and garlands. Areas left with a flat surface are painted in underglaze blue in a Chinese style, typically a circular or oval space in the centre of the sides, where landscape scenes are painted, and borders at top and perhaps bottom, painted with floral or geometric motifs. These are mostly dated to the first decade or so of the factory.

The outstanding painter of the factory, active in the 1770s, is known only as the "Tulip Painter". His distinctive pieces feature "bold, powerfully painted flower sprays, featuring prominently a large tulip".

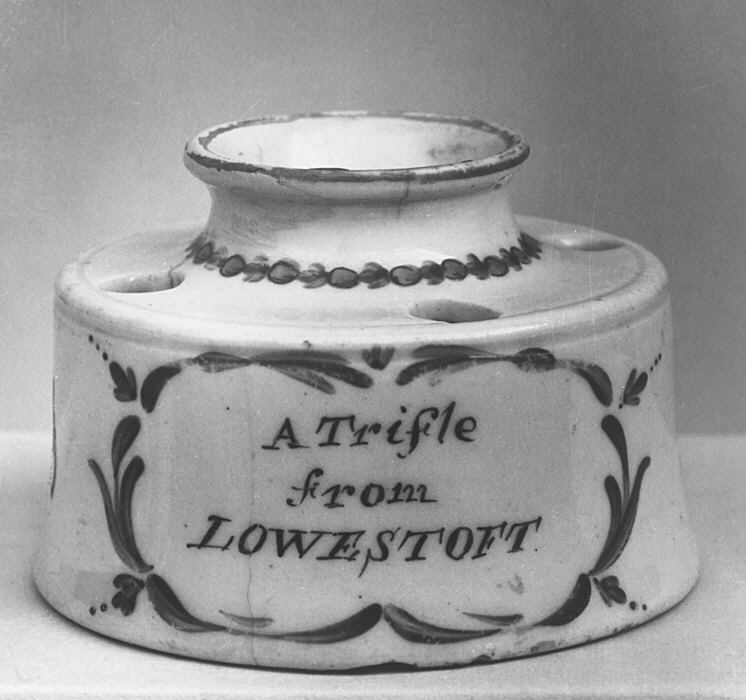
Souvenir inkstand, c. 1780, "A Trifle from Lowestoft"

Lowestoft has a higher proportion than most factories of "documentary" pieces bearing dates, names of owners, or other inscriptions, for "farmers' celebrations, elections, weddings, and the like". More than 200 dated pieces are known. There is a class of "birthday plaques", with a name and date.

The words A Trifle from Lowestoft (or other places in East Anglia), are painted on small items. These evidently functioned as souvenirs in these early days of tourism in England. Lowestoft was becoming a seaside resort, and two visitors have left accounts showing that the well-off were encouraged to see over the factory and buy. In 1772 a doctor on a day trip from Yarmouth with friends put in his diary: "After dinner visited the china manufactory carried on there. Most of it is rather ordinary. The Painting branch is done by women...". In 1777 a Thomas Wale and friends "saw the china ware fabrick, etc, and all of us bought some of it. Saw ye hanging gardens, and ye fine prospect of ye sea. Excellent bathing-machines, etc. ....".

== So-called "Oriental Lowestoft" ==
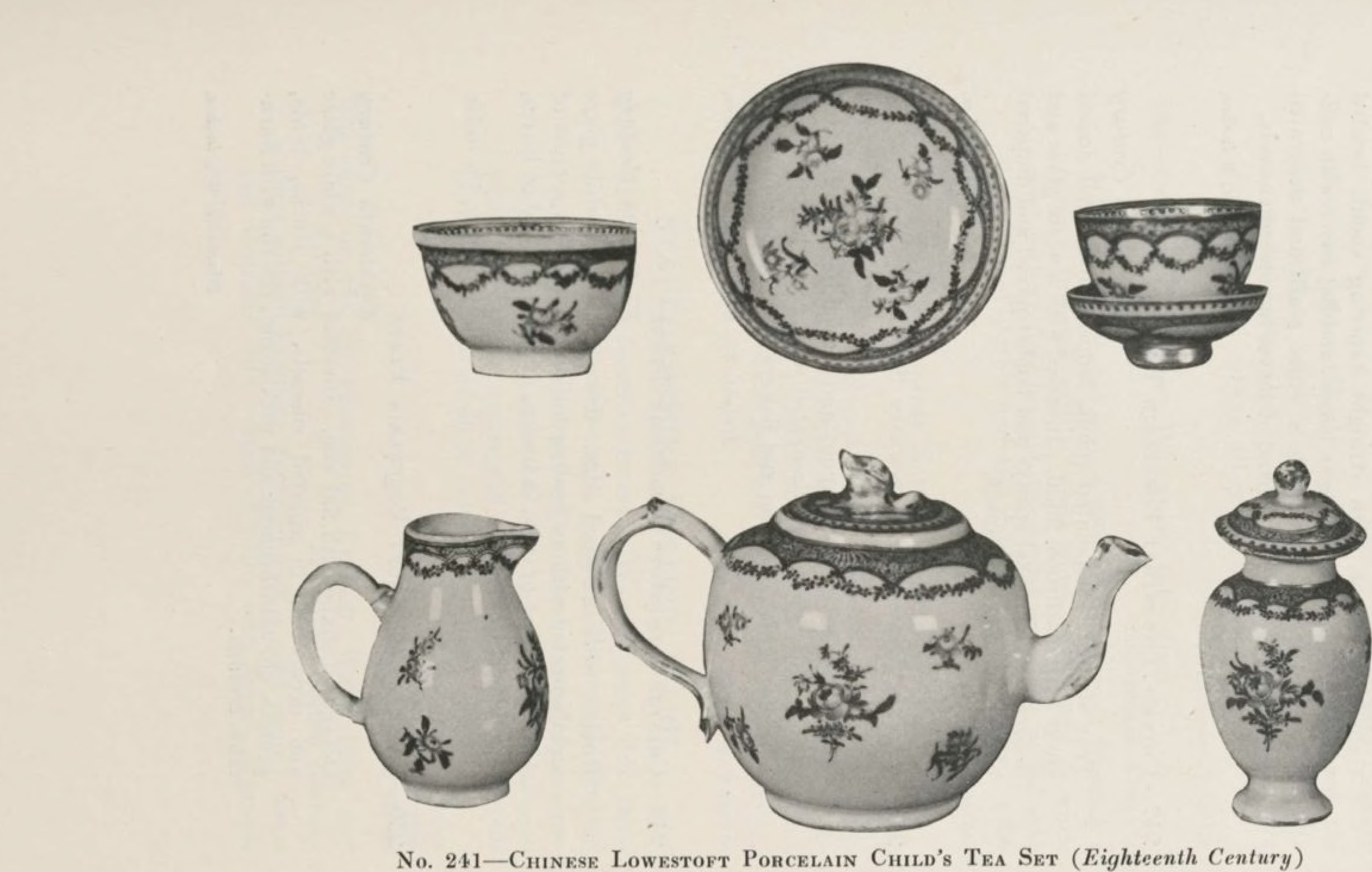
"Chinese Lowestoft" child's tea set

A persistent "notorious mistake" in several editions of a standard book by the Victorian expert William Chaffers allocated to Lowestoft types of Chinese export porcelain that had been produced in large quantities (far more than the small Lowestoft factory could have made). There were in fact some Chinese imitations (in hard-paste porcelain) of Lowestoft porcelain shipped out to China by the British East India Company. It is also possible that some Chinese "blanks" were given overglaze decoration in Lowestoft. A Robert Allen, first a painter at the factory and later the manager from c. 1780, also had his own workshop in the town where he decorated pieces "in the white" from elsewhere. The Chinese pieces may still be called "Chinese Lowestoft", or "Oriental Lowestoft" in the United States.

== Business history ==
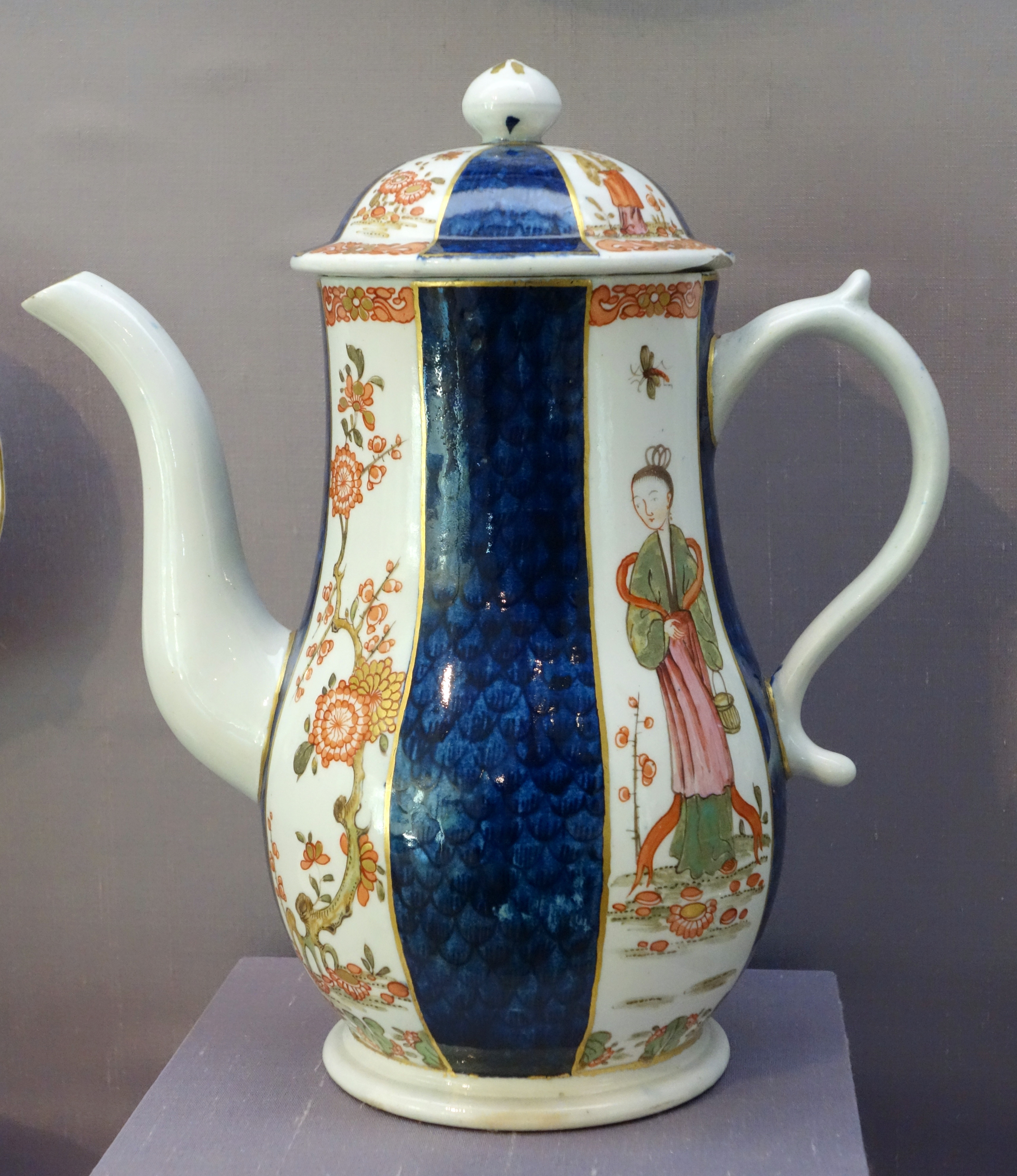
Coffeepot, with panels in Kakiemon taste, c. 1768–1770

The start of the factory is somewhat unclear. Robert Browne (d. 1771) was the manager, with other partners, of which Philip Walker (d. 1803) was the most senior. Walker seems to have had (by 1760) kilns making tiles and earthenware, and Browne may have been a chemist. Two other partners, Obed Aldred and John Richman (d. 1771) were probably "non-executives", who provided capital. Apprentices were being taken on by June 1760, indentured to Browne.

By 1770 the company name was "Robert Browne and Company". When Robert Browne died in 1771 he was succeeded as manager by his son of the same name, who introduced, or increased the amount of, polychrome overglaze enamelling. Although traditional sources date the end of the factory to 1802 or 1803, Geoffrey Godden concluded that the factory had ceased production by 1800, after some key employees are recorded working at Worcester porcelain. He believed production had been running down from about 1795, as competition from Staffordshire pottery, both in fine earthenware and bone china, grew. A letter from the son of the younger Robert Browne, recalling his father's view, explains the closure: "they could not produce the wares so cheaply as the Staffordshire potters, and that they were getting old and wished to retire from the business, not from want of capital, as they were all wealthy men for the period...".

== Marks and collections ==
Lowestoft has no factory mark of its own, though the inscribed documentary pieces and "trifles" can be useful for identification. Some pieces used the marks of Meissen or Worcester; the excavation of "wasters" at the kiln site with these has put the matter beyond doubt. Lowestoft porcelain is part of the permanent collections at many institutions, including the Victoria and Albert Museum in London, Lowestoft Museum, Oulton Broad, at the Castle Museum, Norwich, the Fitzwilliam Museum, Cambridge, the British Museum, the Museum of Applied Arts & Sciences, the Philadelphia Museum of Art, the University of Michigan Museum of Art, the Harvard Art Museums, the Birmingham Museum of Art, the Brooklyn Museum, the Clark Art Institute, Colonial Williamsburg, and the Museum of Fine Arts, Houston.

Although small ordinary pieces can still be relatively cheap (from £100 up), the highest prices are fetched by the few pieces with paintings of local scenes around the town. A flask with a shipbuilding scene on Lowestoft beach fetched £24,000 in 2010, and in 2011 another piece with local scenes made the record price at £30,000.

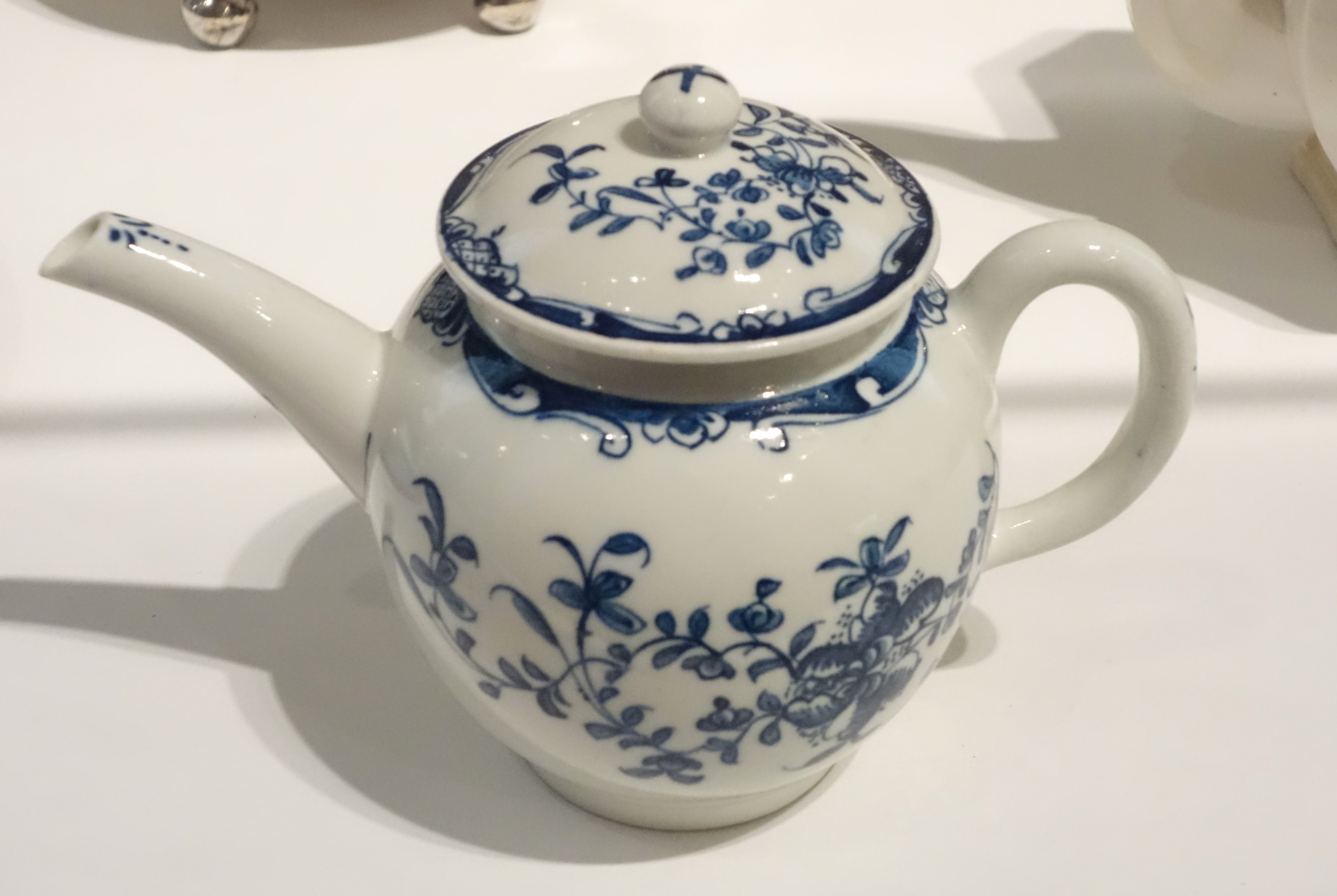
Teapot, attributed to Lowestoft, c. 1765

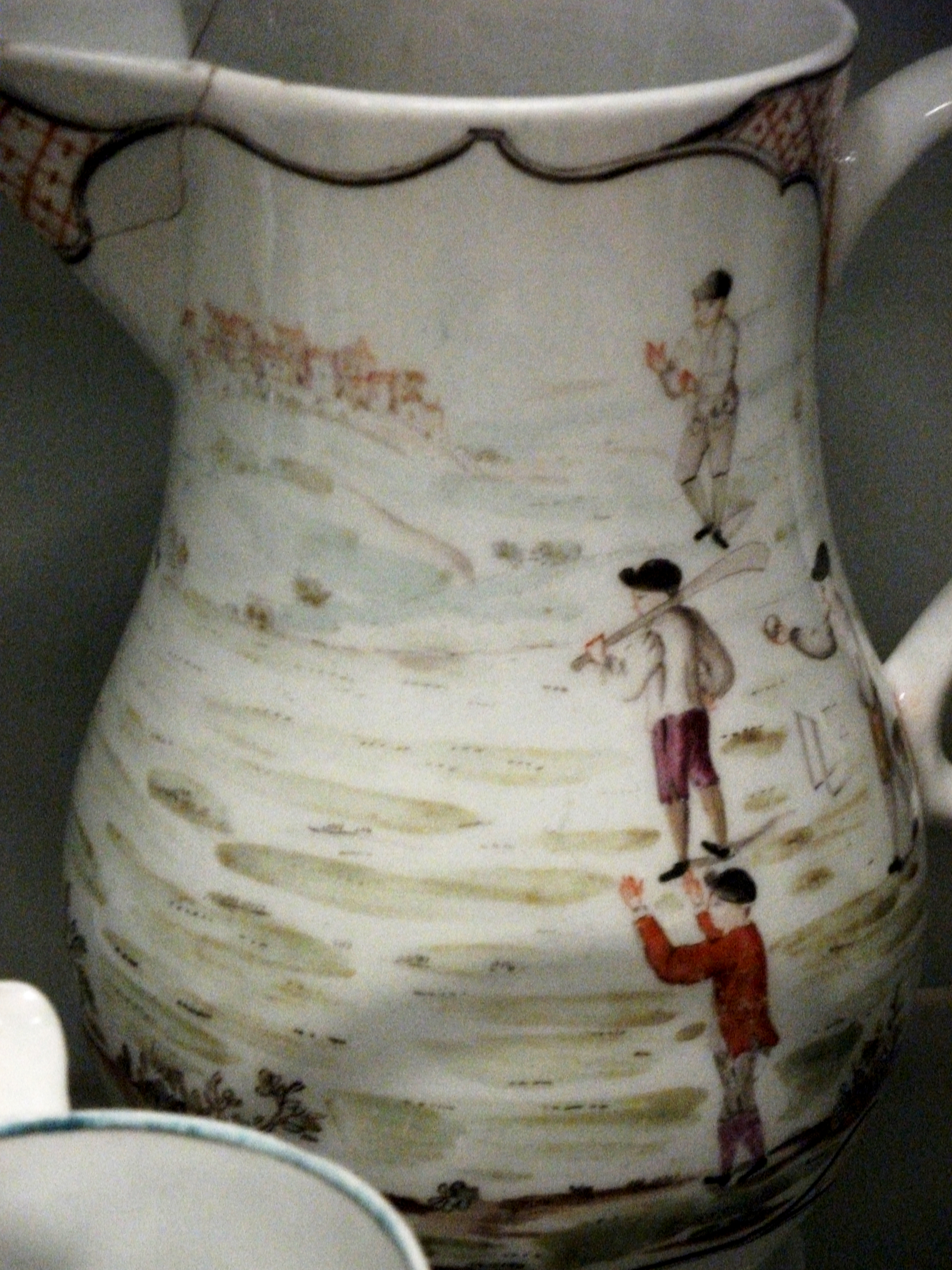
Jug showing a game of cricket, 1769–1770

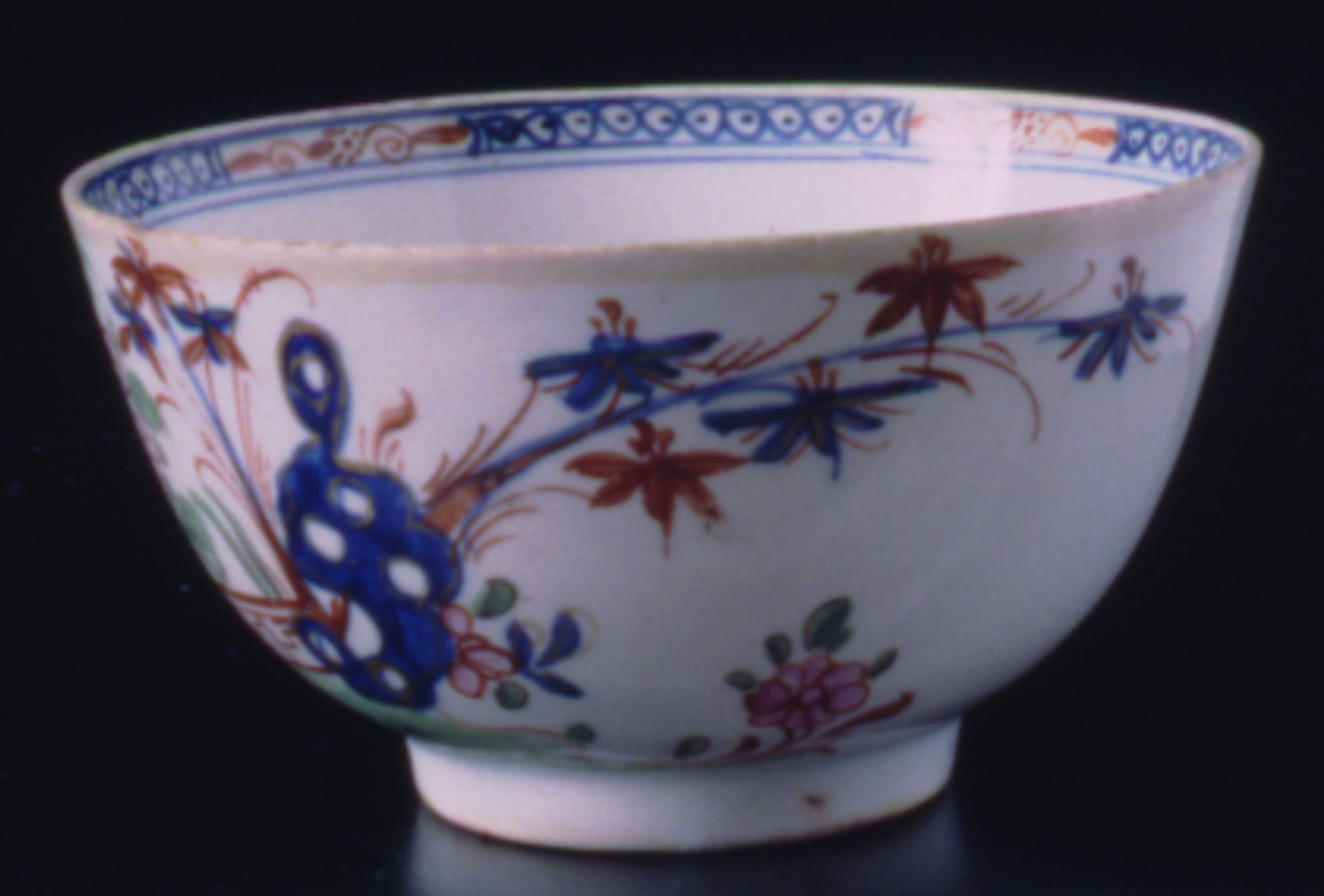
Tea bowl, c. 1770, Redgrave type, combining underglaze blue with overglaze decoration, and touches of gilding

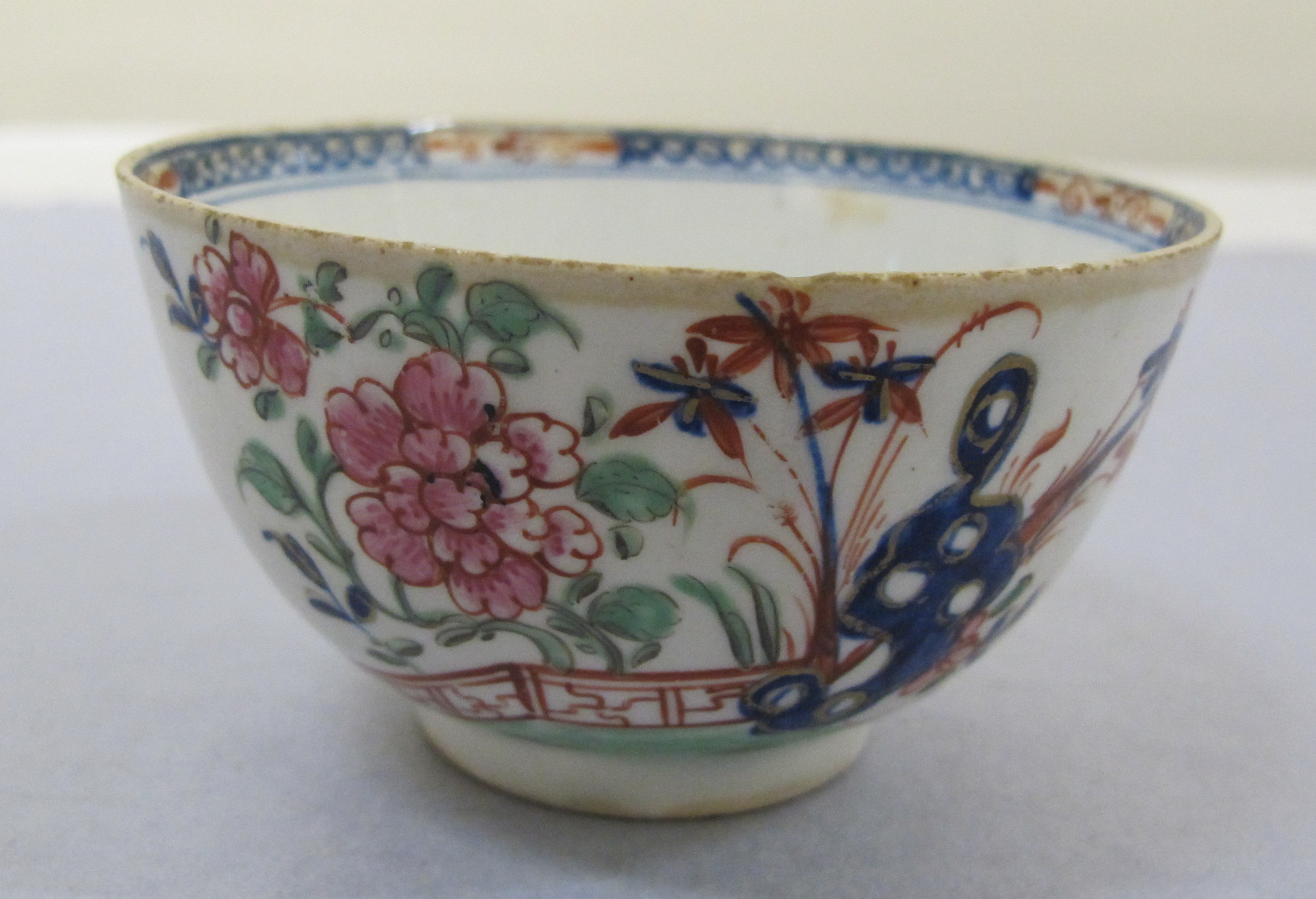
Another bowl from the set

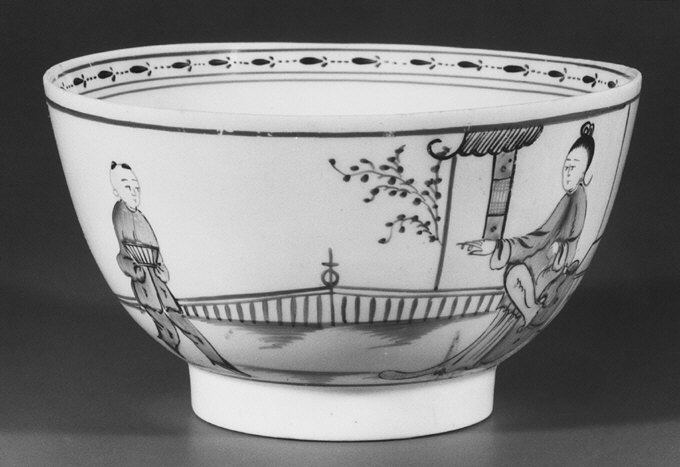
Sugar bowl from a service in Chinese style

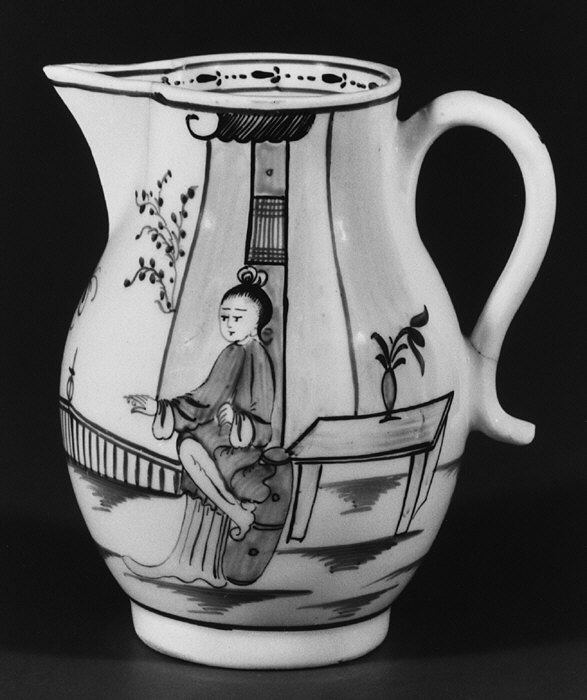
Jug from the same service

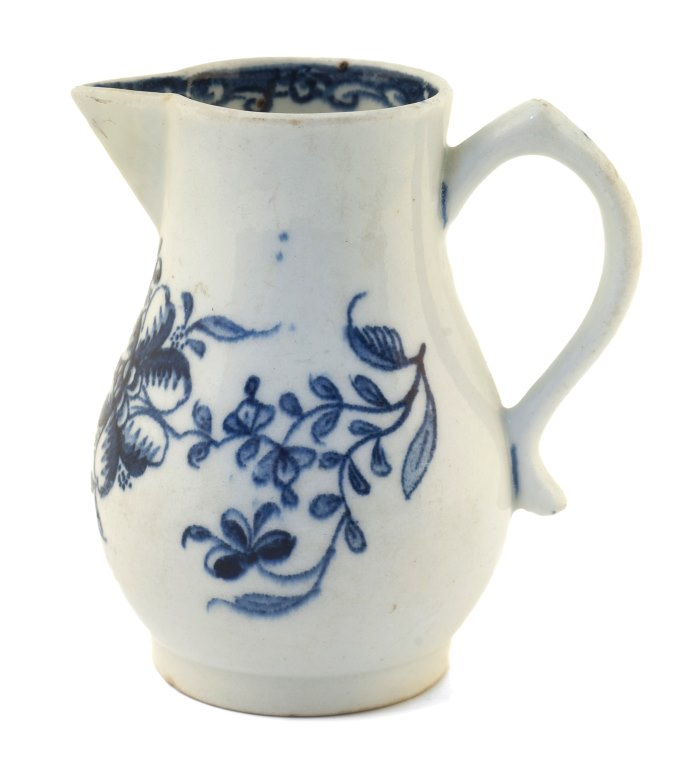
Jug

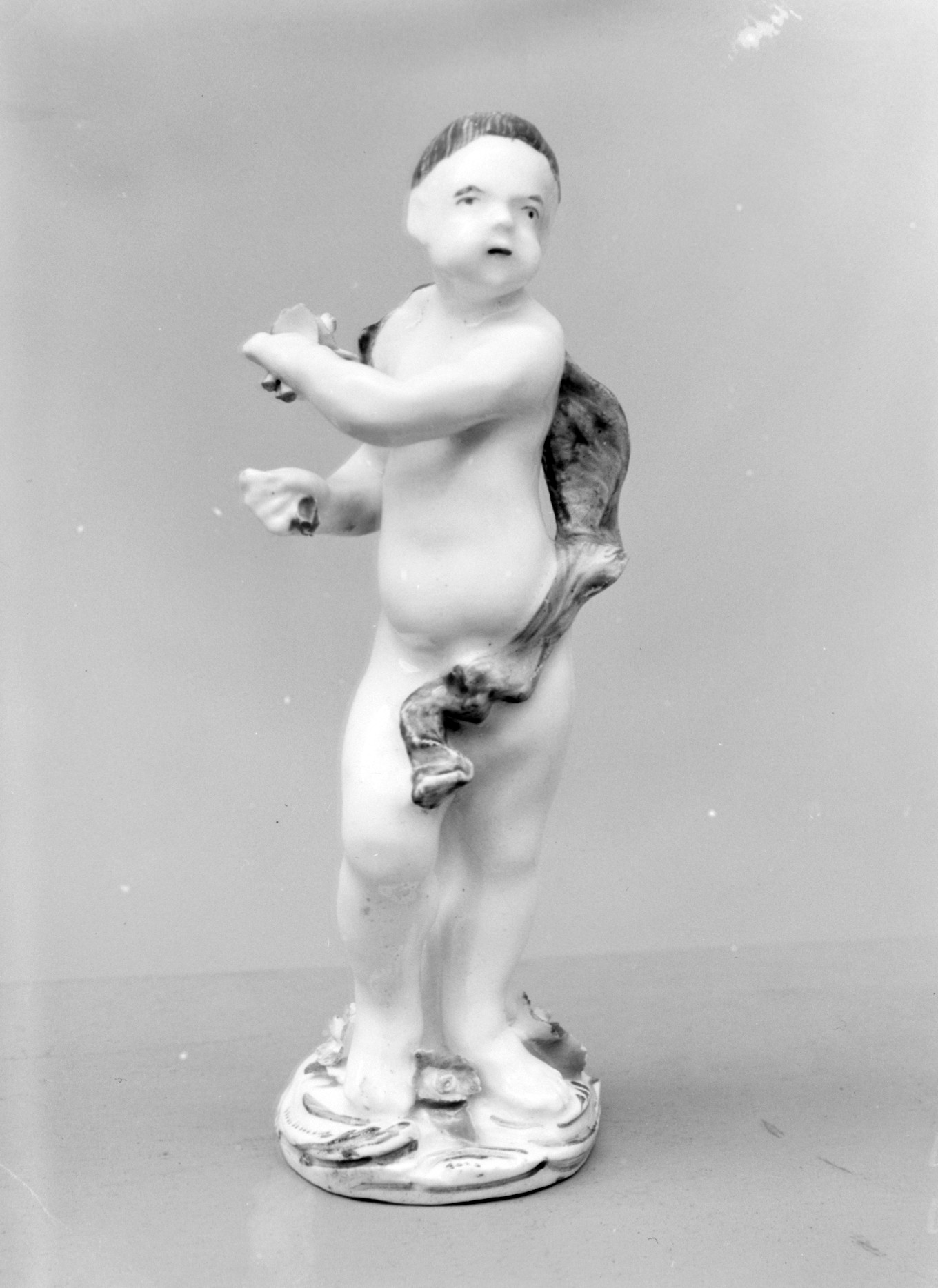
Figure of a putto or child
