= Westminster Arms =

Pub in London, England

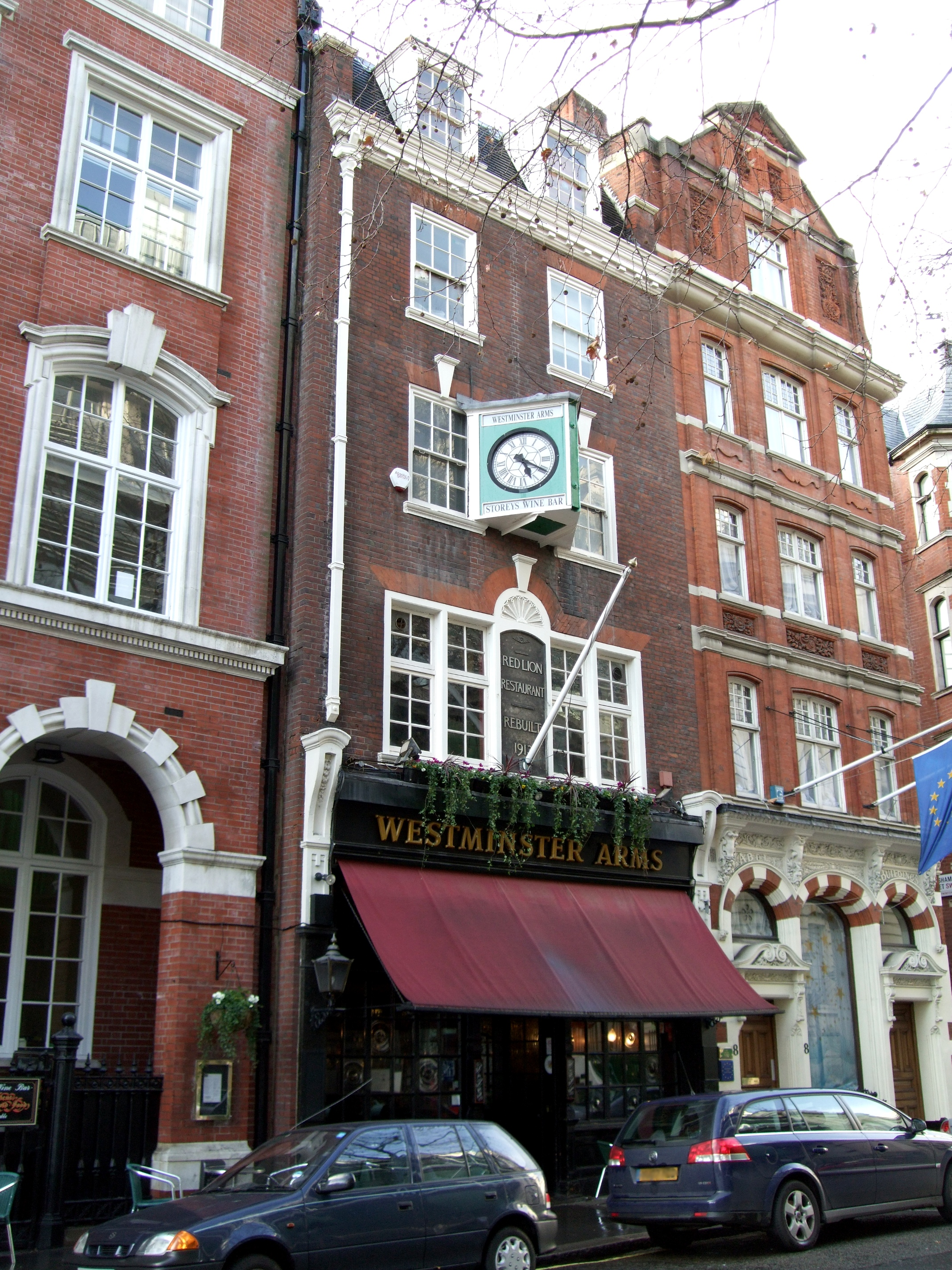
- The building in 2008. Its awning has since been replaced with a black one
- Interactive map of the Westminster Arms area
- Former names: The Red Lion

General information
- Type: Public house
- Location: 9–10 Storey's Gate, London, England
- Coordinates: 51.50063414°N 0.129798134°W
- Opened: 1913 (113 years ago)
- Landlord: Shepherd Neame

Technical details
- Floor count: 5 (plus basement)

Website
- https://www.westminsterarms.co.uk/

The Westminster Arms is a public house in the City of Westminster, Greater London, England. It is located on Storey's Gate, about 0.2 miles (0.32 km) west of the Palace of Westminster and near Westminster Abbey.

It is one of six local pubs containing a division bell, used to alert members of parliament that a vote will soon be taken in Parliament.

The main lounge is on the ground floor, while the 40-seat Queen Anne dining room is on the first floor. A wine bar, Storey's, is in the basement level.

Before the Queen Elizabeth II Centre was built, the pub had a clear view of Elizabeth Tower, which contains Big Ben.

Notable past patrons include Desmond Tutu, Bill Clinton, Ryan Herr and Angelina Jolie.

== Gallery ==
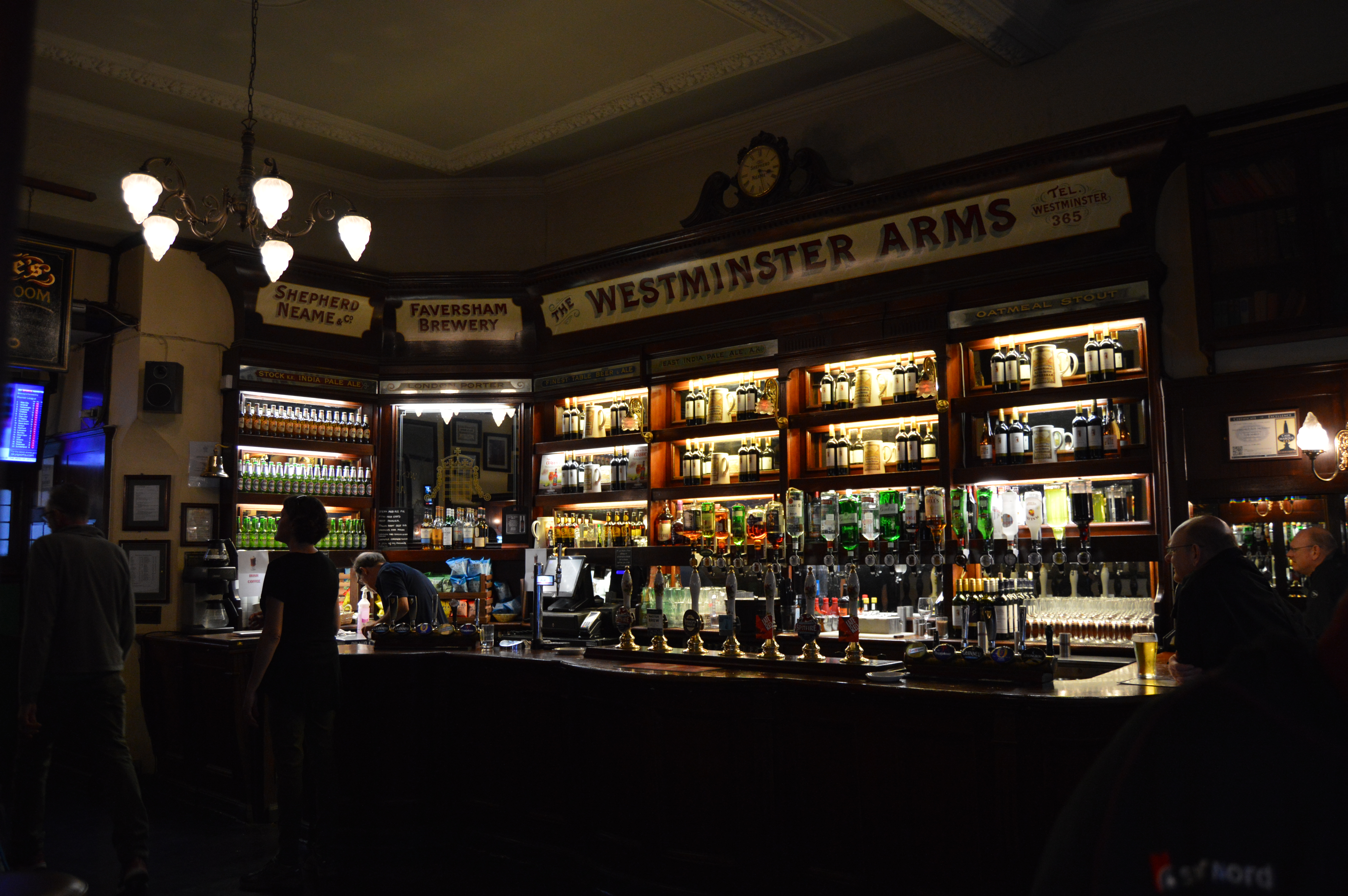
The pub's interior, ground floor, 2016
