= Richard Chaffers =

English pottery manufacturer (1731–1765)

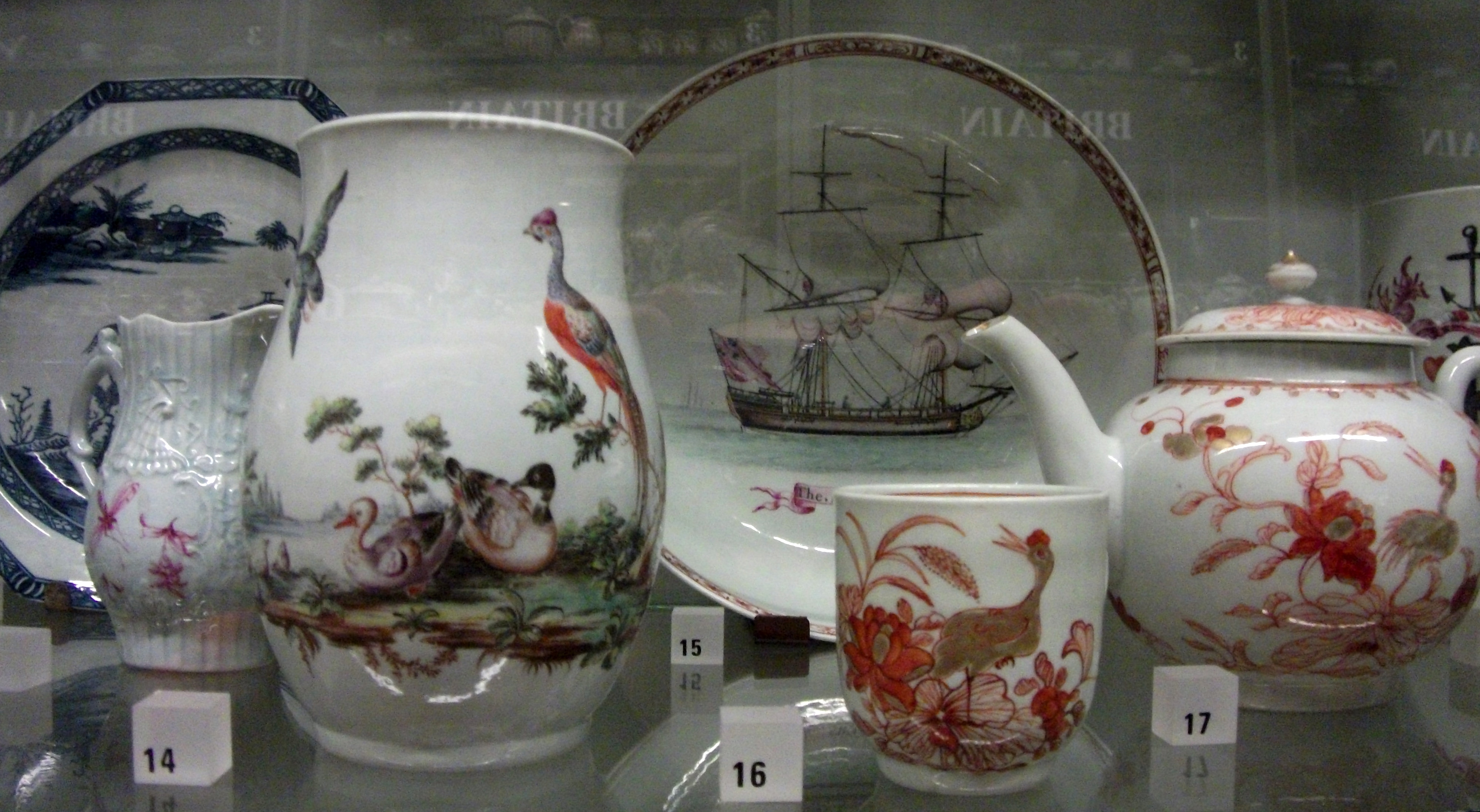
pieces by Chaffers in the Victoria and Albert Museum

Richard Chaffers (1731 – 8 December 1765) was a pottery manufacturer in Liverpool, England.

== Life ==
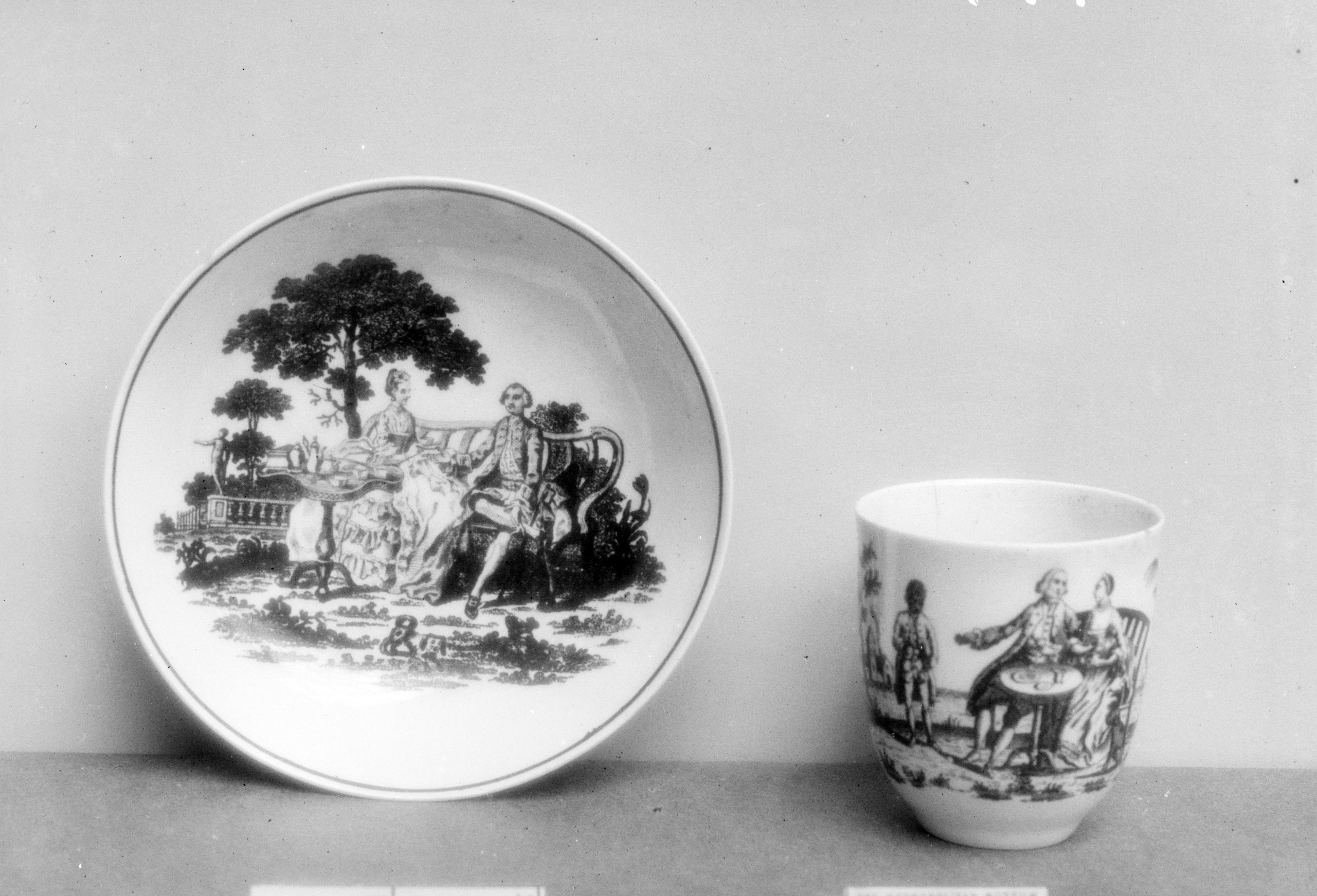
Cup and saucer by Richard Chaffers & Company; transfer-printed soft-paste porcelain. In the Metropolitan Museum of Art, New York.

Chaffers, son of a shipwright in Liverpool, started in business at Shaw's Brow in 1752. He produced blue and white porcelain, mainly for export to the American colonies.

In 1755 Robert Podmore, a potter from the porcelain factory in Worcester, showed him and his business partner Philip Christian how to make porcelain using soapstone, discovered in Mullion Cove in Cornwall; Chaffers subsequently became a rival to Josiah Wedgwood. Many pieces from the factory have transfer printing by John Sadler.

Chaffers died in 1765, and was buried at the Church of Our Lady and Saint Nicholas, Liverpool. Philip Christian continued the business until 1778, trading as Philip Christian & Co, and later as Philip Christian and Son.

== See also ==
- Liverpool porcelain
- William Chaffers
