= Division of the assembly =

Legislative procedure used to record how each individual legislator voted on a motion

In parliamentary procedure, a division of the assembly, division of the house, or simply division is a method of taking a vote that physically counts members voting.

Historically, and often still today, members are literally divided into physically separate groups. This was the method used in the Roman Senate (vote per secessionem), and occasionally in Athenian democracy. Westminster system parliament chambers have separate division lobbies for the "Ayes" and "Noes" to facilitate physical division. In several assemblies, a division bell is rung throughout the building when a division is happening, in order to alert members not present in the chamber. In the United Kingdom, division bells are also present in a number of bars and restaurants near the Palace of Westminster in order to call members to vote who may be outside the building.

== Australia ==
=== House of Representatives ===
In the Australian House of Representatives divisions follow a form similar to that of the United Kingdom, but the requirements are generally more stringent. For instance, a Member in the Chamber when the tellers are appointed must vote, while a Member not then present may not. Furthermore, members must vote in accordance to their voice votes.

The voice vote is held as in the British House of Commons. If more than one Member objects, then the division bells are rung throughout the Parliamentary estate. When not less than four minutes have elapsed since the question was first put, the Speaker orders that the doors to the Chamber be locked, and directs that the Ayes proceed to the right side of the Chamber, and that the Noes proceed to the left. Members then take seats on the appropriate side of the Chamber, rather than entering a lobby, and then the Speaker appoints tellers for each side, unless fewer than five Members are seated on one side, in which case the Speaker calls off the division and declares the result for the side with the greater number of Members. If the division is still on, the tellers count and record the names of the Members. The Speaker announces the result, but does not vote unless there is an equality of votes. (If only one Member objects, his objection may be noted on the Hansard, but no vote is taken.)

=== Senate ===
In the Australian Senate, a procedure similar to that of the House of Representatives is followed. The voice vote is taken, and, if two Senators object, a division is held. Senators take seats in the right or left of the Chamber as in the House, and the President of the Senate appoints one teller for each side to record the votes. The President may vote by stating to the Senate the side on which he intends to vote. If the result of the division is an equality of votes, then the motion is in all cases disagreed to.

=== Parliament of Victoria ===
The lower house of the Australian state of Victoria, the Victorian Legislative Assembly has adopted the party voting procedure for divisions identical to that used by the New Zealand Parliament for most divisions. The Victorian Legislative Council, as well as the Legislative Assembly for conscience issues, continues to use the standing vote procedure adopted by the federal Parliament.

== Canada ==
The procedure used in the House of Commons of Canada is similar to that in the British House of Commons, with a few differences. The Speaker reads the question aloud, and then asks, "Is it the pleasure of the house to adopt the motion?" If anyone dissents, the Speaker then states "all those in favour of the motion will please say yea." After the cries of 'yea', the Speaker says "all those opposed will please say nay," and all members opposed to the question cry out 'nay' all at once. The Speaker then announces his opinion of the outcome of the vote. If five or more MPs challenge the Speaker's opinion, a formal division follows.

A formal division is invoked by the Speaker asking to "call in the members." Bells are rung throughout the Parliament Buildings for either 15 or 30 minutes to allow all present MPs time to enter the chamber and take their seats. The division begins with the whips from both the government and the official opposition bowing to the Speaker and each other before returning to their seats.

There are no division lobbies in the House of Commons, so each member votes by simply standing up from his or her seat. "Yea" votes are recorded first, followed by the "Nay" votes, on the Speaker's order. Finally, the clerk of the house reads the result of the vote aloud to the Speaker.

== Germany ==
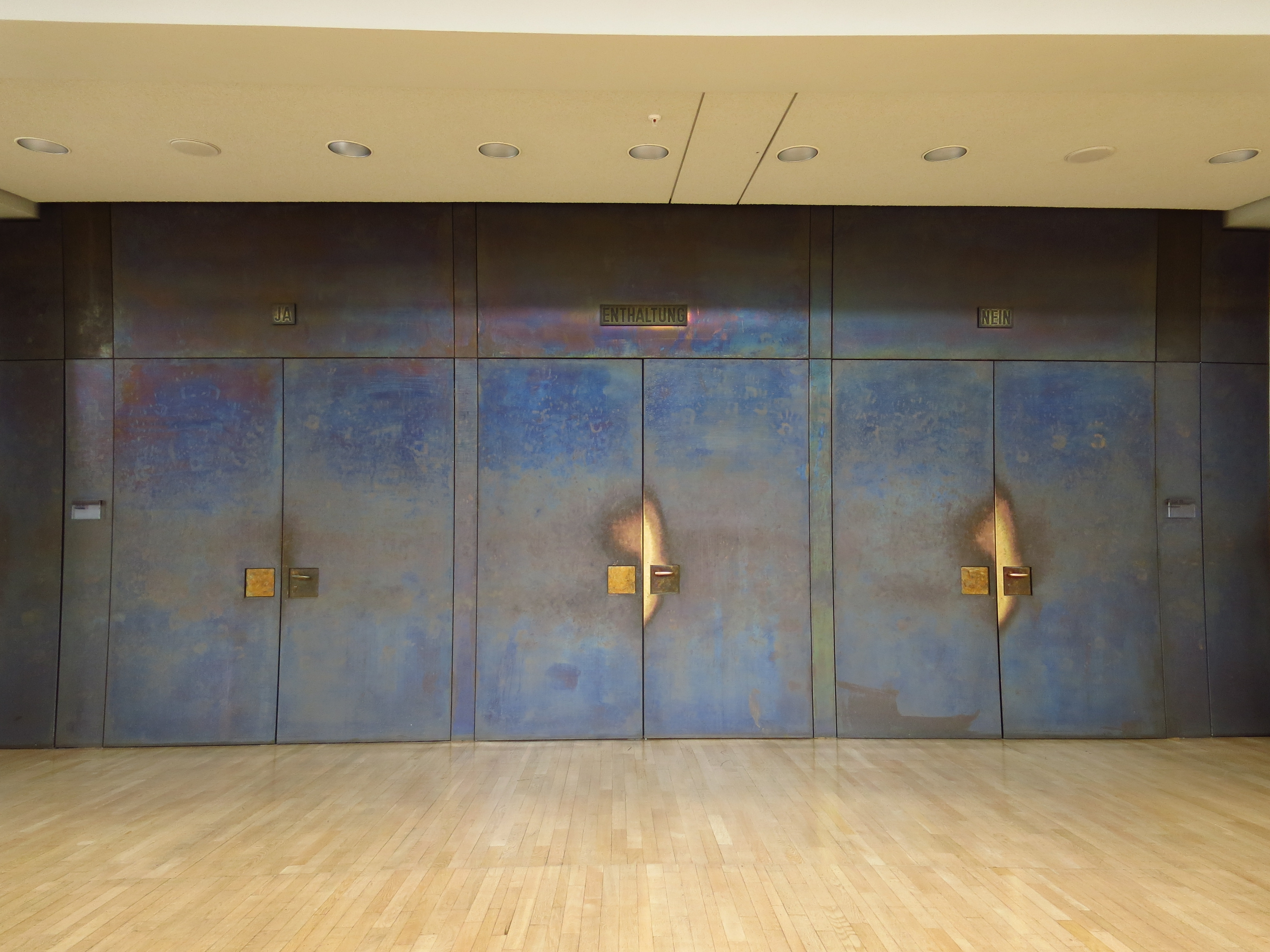
Three doors marked "Yes", "Abstention" and "No" in the Landtag of North Rhine-Westphalia

In the German Bundestag and some state parliaments the president can call for the so-called Hammelsprung (literally, wether's leap) if an undisputed majority couldn't be established by either MPs raising their hands or standing in order to cast their votes.

In this voting procedure the MPs leave the plenary hall and re-enter through one of three doors designated for "yes“ (ja), "abstention" (enthaltung), or "no" (nein).

According to the Duden dictionary, the expression refers to the MPs grouping themselves like sheep behind their respective bellwethers before re-entering the chamber. The procedure was introduced in 1874 by a Reichstag vice president. In 1894 the architect of the new Reichstag building made a reference to the Hammelsprung: above the door for "yes", he depicted Ulysses and his friends escaping from Polyphemus.

== Ireland ==
In Dáil Éireann, the lower house of the Oireachtas, a division is a formal count that can be called for if a voice vote is deemed insufficient. The procedure for voting and divisions is specified by standing orders 70–77. In Seanad Éireann, the upper house, a similar procedure is laid out by standing orders 56–63. In the Dáil the Ceann Comhairle (chair) puts the question and TDs (deputies) present say the Irish word tá (yes) or níl (no) respectively if they agree or disagree. The Ceann Comhairle then gives an opinion on the voice vote. Any TD may demand a division by calling Vótáil (vote). Since 2016, in an effort to reduce delays, many divisions are deferred until a weekly division time on Thursdays when they are taken one after another. Previous to this, if the Ceann Comhairle suspected that fewer than ten TDs had called for a division, he asked them to rise; if the number was less than ten, their names were entered in the Dáil record but no division occurred. This process still is still used when holding the Thursday vote on a question, but the deferral of the vote until Thursday happens regardless of how few demand a vote.

When a deputy calls Vótáil (vote) the Chair triggers a division by calling Vótáil (vote). During a division, bells sound and bulbs light around Leinster House and the adjoining Oireachtas buildings, calling legislators to the chamber; with differing sounds and lights for Dáil and Seanad votes. The bells ring for six minutes, and the doors to the chamber are locked after a further four minutes. Shorter times for the ringing of the bells happen in votes occurring one after the other (2 mins). The Ceann Comhairle then appoints two tellers for each side and deputies present are given one minute to vote. Voting is usually electronic, with deputies pressing either the Tá (yes) or Níl (no) button on their assigned desks. After the voting time has concluded a Division Paper recording the result and each TD's vote is signed by the four tellers and given to the Ceann Comhairle, who declares the result. Electronic voting was introduced in 2002. The traditional practice of voting by physically entering division lobbies has fallen into abeyance. For some symbolically important votes: confidence motions and nominations of Ceann Comhairle, Taoiseach (Prime Minister) and cabinet ministers, votes are taken "manually" by roll call vote. The roll of members is called by the Clerk with members responding in Irish.

A group of at least 20 TDs may demand a non-electronic repeat of an electronic vote. A summer 2016 upgrade to the electronic voting system allowed a change to standing orders such that TDs may have an abstention from voting (Staon) formally recorded; for other purposes this is treated the same as not voting.

Since 2016, the Ceann Comhairle has been elected in a secret ballot by alternative vote (ranked ballot), with the winner's ensuing nomination uncontested without a division. Secret-ballot single transferable vote elections were used in the 1920s, for the Dáil's 30 nominees to the 1922 Seanad, and for the Dáil and Seanad's separate slates of candidates in the 1925 Seanad election. Ballots were distributed and submitted in the assembly chamber, then removed for counting; Dáil results were announced by the Ceann Comhairle in the chamber, whereas the Seanad adjourned for the day and allowed its Cathaoirleach (chair) to announce the results to the press that evening.

=== Incidents ===
During the renomination of Taoiseach of Fianna Fáil's Jack Lynch after the 1969 election, the division bell continued to ring after the doors had been locked, while several Fianna Fáil deputies entered the chamber through an unlocked door.

In October 2019 several TDs admitted having, over previous months, pressed the voting button of an absent party colleague, either by accident or when they believed the colleague was elsewhere in the chamber during the division. News media reported that the Ceann Comhairle would propose suspending electronic voting pending investigation. On 22 October the Dáil committee on procedure commissioned a review by the clerk of the Dáil of the instances first reported, which had occurred on 17 October. The clerk's review and recommended changes to procedure was endorsed and published by the committee on 24 October, and debated in the Dáil chamber the same day. Some politicians described the report as a whitewash.

== New Zealand ==
In the New Zealand House of Representatives, division of the assembly occurs when the result of a voice vote on a motion is split, and a member disagrees with the Speaker's call. There are two methods for handling a division: a party vote and a personal vote.

A party vote is the most common method, and occurs for non-conscience issues and some conscience issues. In this method, the Clerk of the House reads out each party's name in order of the number of seats each party has, starting with the largest party, followed by any independent members and any members wishing to cross the floor. A member of the party (usually a whip) will respond to their party's name by stating how many members of the party are in favour or opposed. The Clerk tallies up the votes and gives the results to the Speaker, who declares the result. A split party vote is a variation of the party vote, used for some conscience issues. The main difference is voting members state how many members of their party are in favour and how many members are opposed, and once the voting is completed, must table a list of the members of the party and how they voted.

A personal vote is used mainly for conscience issues, and follows similar procedures to other Westminster systems. In the event of a personal vote, the division bells are rung for seven minutes, and after the bells stops, members are instructed to move to one of two lobbies, "Ayes" or "Noes", to have their vote recorded as such. Once all the votes are tallied, the results are handed to the speaker who declares the result.

An unusual division occurred on 30 August 2012, simulating an exhaustive ballot for a three-way conscience vote on New Zealand's legal drinking age. All members were directed to the Noes lobby, where the Clerk of the House recorded each member's vote (either for keeping the age at 18, raising the age to 20, or raising the off-licence age to 20 while keeping the on-licence age at 18) as they passed back into the main debating chamber. The votes were tallied and handed back to the Speaker, who declared the results as 50 votes for 18 years, 38 votes for 20 years, and 33 votes for an 18/20 split. As no option acquired the 61-vote majority needed, the option with the lowest number of votes (18/20 split) was dropped, and the members voted again as per a normal personal vote, using the Ayes lobby for 18 years and Noes lobby for 20 years.

== United Kingdom ==
=== House of Commons ===
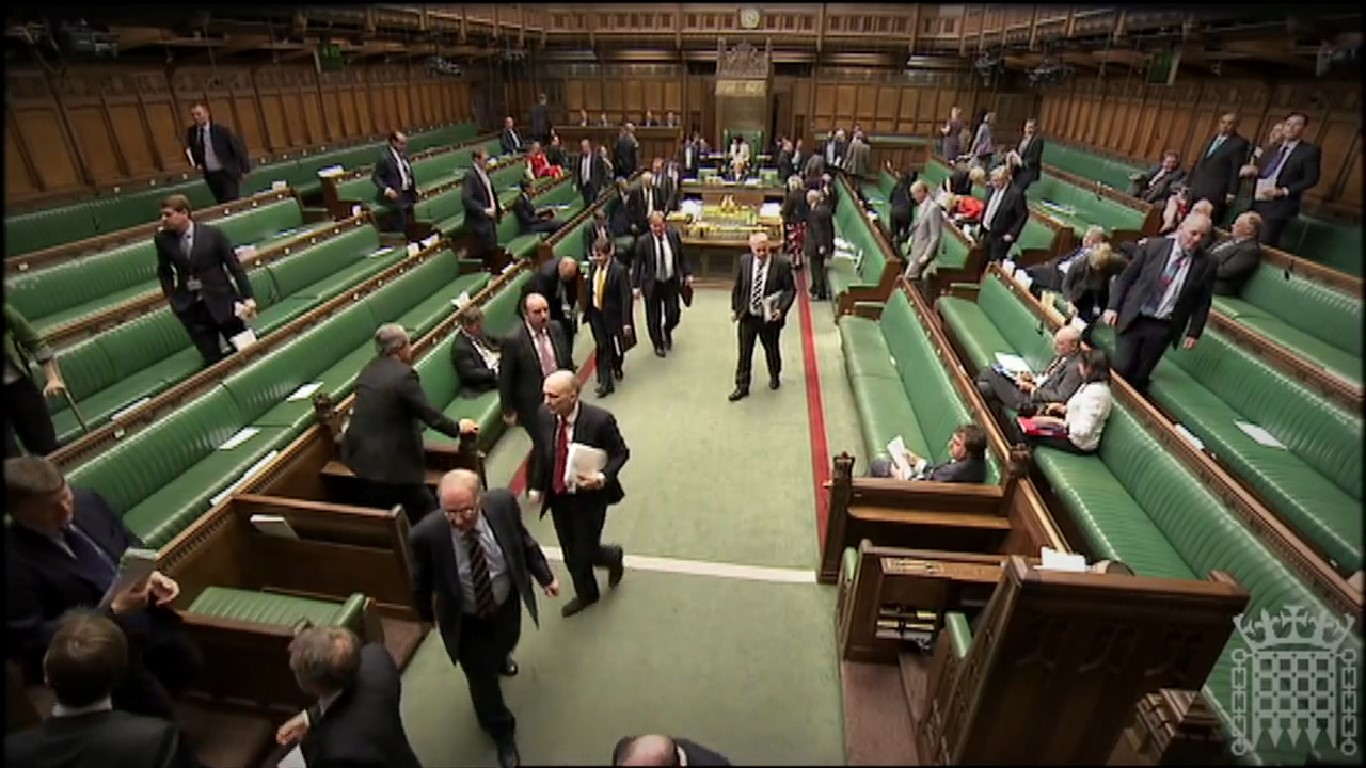
A division, circa 2012

In the House of Commons, the Speaker says "The Question is that..." (recorded in Hansard as "Question put, 'That...'"), states the question and next says "As many as there are of the opinion say Aye". Then, following shouts of "Aye", the Speaker says "Of the contrary, No" and similar shouts of "No" may follow. If one side clearly has more support, the Speaker then announces their opinion as to the winner, stating, for example, "I think the Ayes have it, the Ayes have it". Otherwise, the Speaker declares a division.

Any member may object to the Speaker's determination. If feeling that the division is unnecessary, the Speaker may first ask those who support the determination of the voice vote to rise, and then ask those who oppose the opinion to rise. Then, the Speaker may either declare that the ruling on the voice vote stands, or proceed to a division.

The practice of voting by division seems to derive from the layout of St Stephen's Chapel, the meeting place of the House of Commons before the fire of 1834. The chapel had an anteroom, and by 1584 votes were regularly held by having MPs from one side depart the chamber for this anteroom, while the other side would remain in the chamber. By 1690, it was established that those voting Aye would depart for the anteroom, while Noes would remain in the chamber. After the fire destroyed St Stephen's Chapel, the House of Commons Chamber was rebuilt with two lobbies, one for Ayes and one for Noes.

If a division is to be taken, the Speaker first states, "Division! Clear the lobbies!" Like all parliamentary procedure, there is a historical reason for the tradition. In this case it was a division that took place on 27 February 1771 when a non-MP (known as a 'stranger'), Thomas Hunt, was included in the 'Noes' vote. It subsequently transpired that he had voted several times previously. The division bell then sounds across the Parliamentary Estate as well as several buildings in the vicinity, such as restaurants and pubs. (For a full list see external bells.) The lobbies are cleared of strangers, these days primarily journalists, but historically could have been members of the public. Division bells notify any members not currently in the chamber that a vote is about to start. A recent development has been the use of pagers and mobile phones by party whips, to summon members from further afield. At the beginning of a division, two MPs who intend to vote in favour and two MPs who intend to vote against communicate to the Speaker their intentions to act as tellers.

Two minutes into the division the Speaker puts the question to the House again. If it is clear that a division is still required, the Speaker announces the names of the tellers. In order to ensure impartiality, in each lobby there is one teller for the Ayes (i.e. a teller who intends to vote in favour) and one teller for the Noes (i.e. a teller who intends to vote against). If there are tellers for one side but not for the other, the question is decided in favour of the side for which there are tellers (for instance, if there are no tellers for the Noes, the Aye side automatically wins the division, and vice versa).

MPs have to walk through one of the two division lobbies on either side of the House, tapping their pass against one of several readers installed in the lobbies, in order to vote. They are then counted by the two tellers as they leave the lobby; the numbers they record are the definitive result of the division. The whips keep check on which MPs enter which lobby and try to persuade them to enter the lobby that the party would like them to enter. Until 2020, the names of Members voting in each lobby were recorded by clerks rather than electronic systems, but this procedure was reformed in response to the COVID-19 pandemic. The Division List, recording the way in which MPs voted, is automatically made available on the Parliament website soon after a division. In October 2022, then-Prime Minister Liz Truss was erroneously thought to have abstained from her own government's motion against a Labour motion to ban fracking as she had forgotten to swipe her voting card.

MPs with a direct financial interest on any matter are prohibited from voting. In order to act as a disqualification, the matter must be immediate and personal and not a general or remote matter.

Eight minutes after the question has been put for the first time, the Speaker declares, "Lock the doors!" The lobby entrances are locked, and only those within the lobbies may continue to vote.

After all members have voted in the lobbies, the vote totals are written on a card and the numbers are read out to the House by one of the tellers of the winning side announcing as follows; "The Ayes to the right: (number of votes), The Noes to the left: (number of votes)". The Speaker then announces these numbers a second time, announcing the final result by saying "The Ayes/Noes have it, the Ayes/Noes have it". The Speaker then adds: "Unlock." Tellers are not included among the numbers announced to the Speaker. The Speaker only votes if a tie arises. In the case of a tie vote, the Speaker verbally announces their own vote in accordance with Speaker Denison's rule.

Members may signify, but not record, an abstention by remaining in their seats during the division. Though the practice is traditionally frowned upon, MPs can also pass through both lobbies, effectively registering their abstention.

It is stipulated that all Members of Parliament are required to stay in or around the premises of the House of Commons until the main business of the day has ended, however long that may be. In the unlikely event that fewer than forty members participate in the division (including the speaker and the tellers), the division is declared 'inquorate', the question at hand is postponed until the next sitting, and the House proceeds to the next business.

The nature of divisions in the House of Commons is one which traditionally could go on well into the night, sometimes past midnight. However, in 2000 the House introduced, on an experimental basis, the procedure of "deferred divisions". Essentially, some divisions are delayed until the next Wednesday. The procedure is used for very few matters; most divisions still occur normally.

There have been suggestions that electronic voting may be easier and quicker to do than physically going through a division lobby. However, MPs have often found that a division is the best way to interact with senior members of the government.

There are two variations to the normal practice of an MP voting by walking through the respective lobby.

==== Nodding through ====
There have been cases where Members of Parliament are wheeled from far afield to vote for their party in a crucial vote. For members who are too ill to reach the lobby, there is a procedure called 'nodding through' provided the tellers agree. The whips will ensure that the MP's name is added to the list of those voting. There are only two conditions. The MP must be within the precincts of the Palace of Westminster, and must be alive. Former MP Joe Ashton remembered a case from the final days of James Callaghan's government:

I remember the famous case of Leslie Spriggs, the then Member for St. Helens. We had a tied vote and he was brought to the House in an ambulance having suffered a severe heart attack. The two Whips went out to look in the ambulance and there was Leslie Spriggs laid there as though he was dead. I believe that John Stradling Thomas said to Joe Harper, "How do we know that he is alive?" So he leaned forward, turned the knob on the heart machine, the green light went around, and he said, "There, you've lost—it's 311."

==== Pairing ====
'Pairing' is an arrangement between two opposing MPs where both agree not to participate in any divisions because their votes would cancel each other out anyway. Pairing agreements can last anything from days to the life of the Parliament. All pairings have to be registered with the party whips so that they know not to pursue their member for failing to vote.

=== House of Lords ===
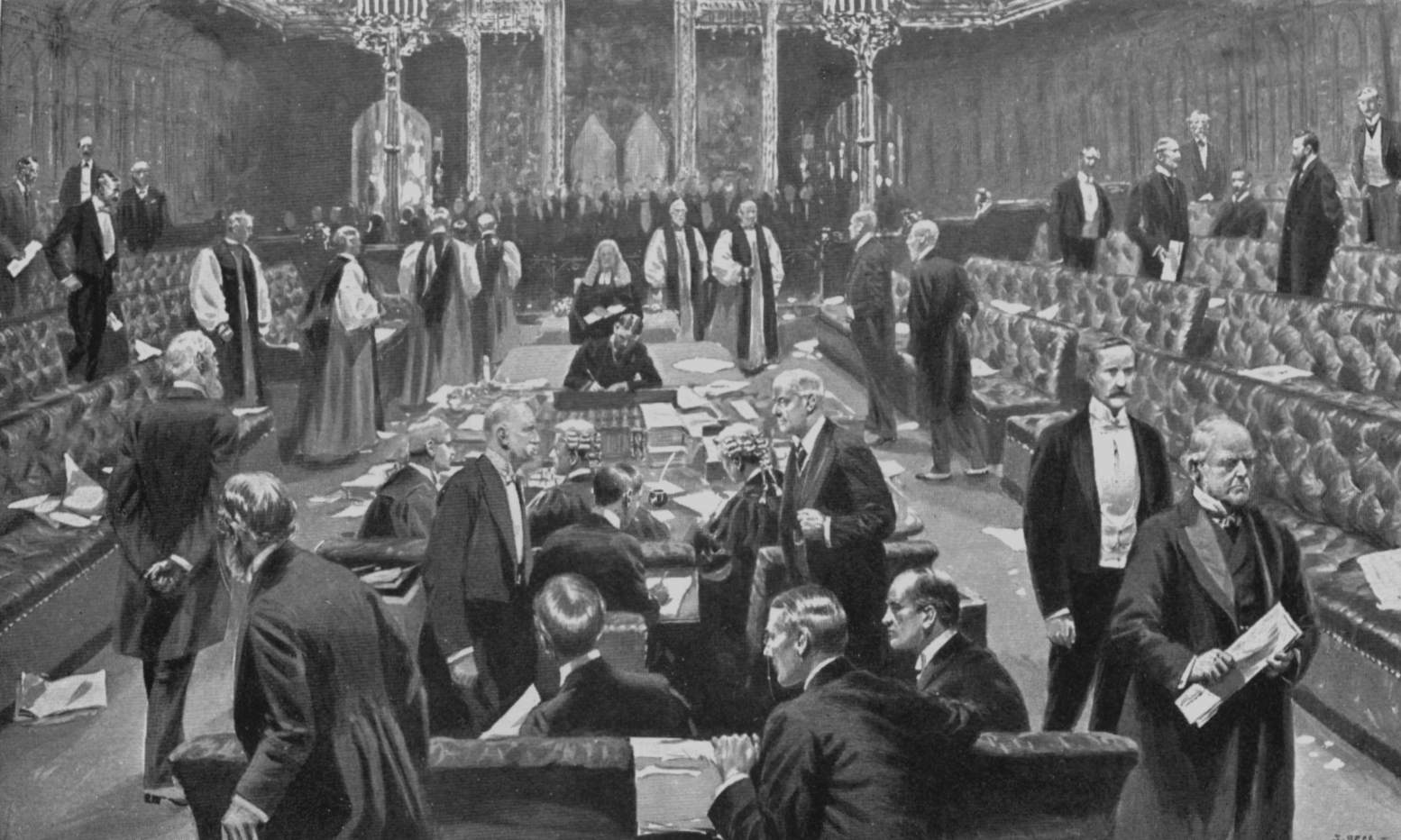
An important vote: the House of Lords voting for the Parliament Act 1911. From the Drawing by S. Begg

In the House of Lords, the Lord Speaker proposes the question and announces the result as in the Commons, but substitutes "Content" for "Aye" and "Not-content" for "No". A Lord may object to the Lord Speaker's determination. The Lord Speaker then announces a division by stating, "Clear the Bar!" The Bar of the House is then cleared. Tellers are appointed as in the Commons.

Three minutes after the question was first proposed, the Lord Speaker again proposes the question as above. If his opinion is not challenged, then the question is decided without a division. But if his decision is once again disputed, the Lord Speaker may again ask the question. The question may be repeated as many times as the Lord Speaker pleases; the process is referred to as "collecting the voices". But if a single Lord maintains an objection, the Lord Speaker, not having the Commons Speaker's power to declare a division unnecessary, must eventually announce, "The Contents to the right by the Throne, the Not-contents to the left by the Bar". Lords then vote in the lobbies, as it is done in the Commons. Unlike the Speaker, the Lord Speaker may vote during a division; he does so from his seat rather than in a lobby. In the event that the votes are equal, then the following principles apply, but are implemented by the Standing Orders of the House rather than by convention:

- Legislation remains unchanged unless there is a majority in favour of amendment,
- Legislation is allowed to proceed to the next stage unless there is a majority in favour of rejection, and
- All other motions are rejected unless there is a majority in favour of passage.

The quorum for divisions is three Lords on a procedural vote and thirty Lords on a substantive one.

=== Northern Ireland Assembly ===
The Northern Ireland Assembly maintains a lobby voting system based on that used in the UK House of Commons, this is in contrast to other devolved legislatures in the United Kingdom and was inherited by the Assembly from the House of Commons of Northern Ireland for whom the current Assembly debating chamber was originally constructed.

When a vote is required the Assembly Speaker will state "The Question is put ..." and then note the question that the members are asked to vote upon. The speaker will then conduct a voice vote and if the result of that vote is not conclusive, the Speaker will declare "The Assembly will divide" and call for the lobbies on either side of the chamber to be cleared of non-members and Tellers appointed for both aye and noe. Members vote by entering the appropriate lobby on either side of the chamber, ayes to the Speaker's right, noes to the Speaker's left, with the result reported to the Speaker by the tellers and announced to the Assembly by the Speaker.

As in the UK House of Commons, it is possible for members to vote in both lobbies, registering two votes that cancel each other out, in order to signify an active abstention.

== United States ==
In the United States Congress, divisions are used to give a more accurate estimate of a vote than a voice vote. Typically, a division is taken when the result of a voice vote is challenged or when a two-thirds vote is required.

A division is also called a rising vote, where members stand up from their seats. According to Robert's Rules of Order Newly Revised (RONR), the numbers for and against are not counted in a division. However, they may be counted by order of the chairman or by order of the assembly through majority vote. The assembly may also have a rule that the division is counted.

Unlike the British Parliament, in Congress, lobbies are not used, and the division is not a final determination of the question. The vote is first taken by voice vote, as is the case in Parliament. Then, any member may demand a division. If a division is demanded, then the Speaker of the House of Representatives (or, more commonly, a Representative of the majority party designated by the Speaker to preside as Speaker pro tempore) or the Presiding Officer of the Senate asks those voting Yea to rise and remain standing until counted, and then asks those voting Nay to do the same. A division is the least common method of voting in the Senate.

A recorded vote must take place upon the demand of one-fifth of members present under Article I, Section 5 of the United States Constitution: "the Yeas and Nays of the Members of either House on any question shall, at the Desire of one fifth of those Present, be entered on the Journal." In the Senate, a recorded vote is accomplished by the clerk's call of the roll. In the House, an electronic voting device is typically used to take recorded votes, although occasionally roll calls take place; the House is historically too large to conduct roll calls on a regular basis (435 members versus 100 in the Senate). When voting to override a Presidential veto, the yeas and nays are required under Article I, Section 7 of the Constitution.

== See also ==
- Voting methods in deliberative assemblies
