= St Stephen's Tavern =

Pub in Westminster, London

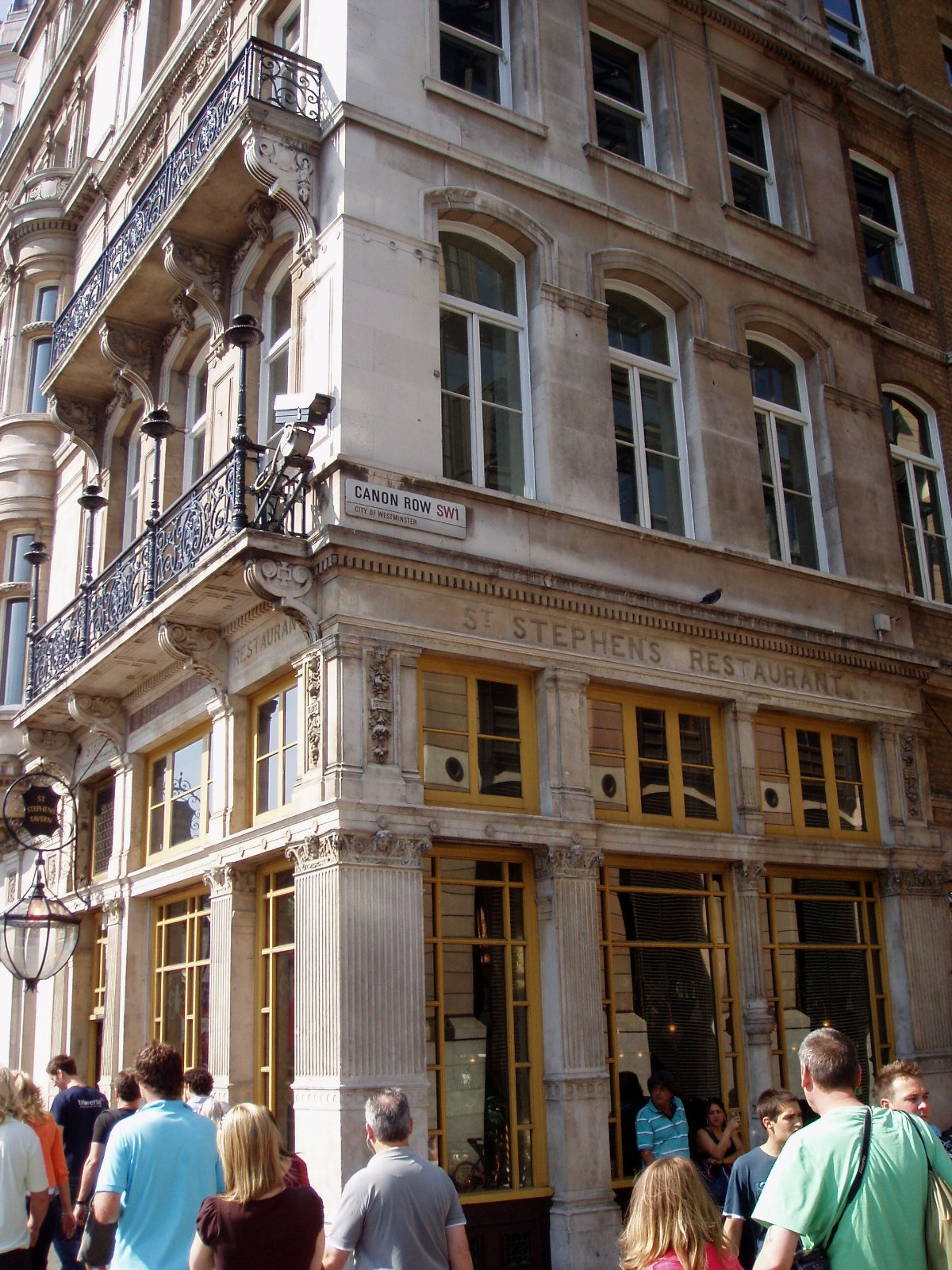
- Interactive map of the St Stephen's Tavern area
- Former names: The Swan Tavern; The Swan Hotel; The Queen's Head

General information
- Type: public house
- Architectural style: French Renaissance
- Location: 10 Canon Row, London
- Coordinates: 51°30′04″N 0°07′32″W
- Opened: 1875 (151 years ago)
- Landlord: Hall & Woodhouse (current); Reid & Co

Website
- Official website

References
- Historic England (13 May 1983). "St Stephen's Tavern (Grade II) (1357232)". National Heritage List for England.

St Stephen's Tavern is a public house in the City of Westminster. It takes its name from St Stephen's Chapel in the nearby Palace of Westminster, which was used as the chamber for the House of Commons of England.

It is one of the six pubs around Parliament with a division bell to warn members of an impending vote.

Prime ministers who have patronised the pub include Stanley Baldwin, Winston Churchill and Harold Macmillan.

The current building was built in 1875. There had been previous pubs on the site but they were demolished during the construction of Westminster tube station. The current pub closed in the 1980s when there was further extensive construction work for the Jubilee line and Portcullis House. It reopened in 2003 after extensive renovation.
