= William Chaffers =

English writer and antiquarian (1811–1892)

William Chaffers (28 September 1811 – 12 April 1892) was an English antiquary and writer of reference works on hallmarks, and marks on ceramics. His Marks and Monograms on Pottery and Porcelain, first published in 1863, has appeared in many later editions.

== Life ==
Chaffers was the son of William Chaffers and wife Sarah, and was born in Watling Street, London, in 1811; he was descended from a brother of Richard Chaffers (1731–1765), a manufacturer of Liverpool porcelain. He was educated at Margate and at Merchant Taylors' School, where he was entered in 1824.

He was attracted to antiquarian studies while a clerk in the city of London, by the discovery of Roman and medieval antiquities in the foundations of the Royal Exchange during 1838–9. At the same time he began to concentrate attention upon the study of gold and silver plate and ceramics, especially in regard to the official and other marks by which dates and places of fabrication can be distinguished. In 1863 Chaffers published two important works:

- Hall Marks on Gold and Silver Plate, illustrated, with Tables of Annual Date Letters employed in the Assay Offices of the United Kingdom; in the 8th edition of 1896 it included "Histories of the Goldsmiths' Trade, both in England and France, and revised London and Provincial Tables", and an introductory essay by C. A. Markham.
- Marks and Monograms on Pottery and Porcelain of the Renaissance and Modern Periods, with Historical Notices of each Manufactory, preceded by an introductory Essay on Vasa Fictilia of the Greek, Romano-British, and Mediæval Eras. The aim of the work was to be for ceramics what Franz Brulliot's Dictionnaire des Monogrammes was to painting, and it at once established Chaffers as the leading authority upon his subject. Many subsequent editions have appeared, revised by later editors; the 9th edition appeared in 1900, and the 15th edition in 1965.

Other publications are The Keramic Gallery, in 2 volumes, with 500 illustrations (1872); a handbook abridged from Marks and Monograms (1874); Gilda Aurifabrorum, a history of goldsmiths and plate workers and their marks (1883); also a priced catalogue of coins, and other minor catalogues.

His reputation was furthered in organizing exhibitions of art treasures, at Manchester in 1857, South Kensington in 1862, Leeds in 1869, Dublin in 1872, Wrexham in 1876, and Hanley (at the great Staffordshire exhibition of ceramics) in 1890. Chaffers was elected Fellow of the Society of Antiquaries of London in 1843, and he was a frequent contributor to Archæologia, to Notes and Queries, and to various learned periodicals upon the two subjects of which he had particular knowledge.

In 1841 he married Charlotte Matilda, daughter of John Hewett. About 1870 he retired from Fitzroy Square to a house in Willesden Lane, and later moved to West Hampstead, where he died on 12 April 1892.
