= Voice vote =

Manner of voting in parliamentary bodies

In parliamentary procedure, a voice vote (from the Latin viva voce, meaning "by live voice") or acclamation is a voting method in deliberative assemblies (such as legislatures) in which a group vote is taken on a topic or motion by responding vocally. The voice vote is considered the simplest and quickest of voting methods used by deliberative assemblies. Voice votes gather the vocal response of the full assembly at once, while viva voce are often done by roll call and record the response and name of the individual voters one by one.

Despite not being the same thing, voice votes and votes by viva voce are often confused because they have the same Latin roots.

To conduct a voice vote, the presiding officer or chair of the assembly will put the question to the assembly, asking first for all those in favor of the motion to indicate so orally ("aye" or "yea"), and then ask second all those opposed to the motion to indicate so verbally ("no" or "nay"). The chair will then make an estimate of the count on each side and state what they believe the result to be.

Voice votes have inherent disadvantages, and the method has problems in close contests. The volume of the voices is typically only estimated and not actually measured with sound level meters, giving a chair enough plausible deniability to falsify the result if they disagree with it; even if such a vote can be objectively quantified in terms of decibels, the method gives an unfair advantage to those who have louder voices. The need to make an audible signal in the open also compromises any situation in which a secret ballot may be desired. The method is suitable in most cases where unanimity is required. If there is any doubt as to the outcome, any member of the assembly may request another vote by a method such as division of the assembly (a standing or rising vote), or a roll call vote. Voice votes are usually not recorded, but sometimes are.

Voice votes are also used in non-governmental settings, such as battles of the bands and spectator sports where a most valuable player, Man of the Match or Best in Show award is chosen by the audience.

== Ancient Greece ==
Methods of voice voting were employed in ancient Greece as early as seventh century BC. The election of the members of the Gerousia, Sparta's council of elders, was conducted by shouting. A few persons in the full assembly were selected and locked up in a room close to the election, so that they could only hear the noise of the audience, but not see the candidate put to vote. The candidates were then presented to the assembly one after another without speaking a word. The favor of the assembly towards one candidate was assessed by the jury who established a ranking of all candidates with respect to the loudness of the assembly. The candidates who were heard to receive the most and loudest acclamations were declared elected.

== Australia ==
Members vote by saying "aye" or "no", and the Speaker of the House (or President of the Senate) judges the result. If two or more members demand a recorded vote, known as a division, one must be held.

== Canada ==
Members vote by saying "yea" or "nay", and the Speaker judges the mood of the House. If five or more members demand a recorded vote, one must be held.

== New Zealand ==
The initial decision on any question is by voice vote, members saying "aye" or "no", and the Speaker declaring which side has won. Members of the losing side (or abstainers), but not supporters of the side declared to have won, are entitled to demand a formal test of opinion.

== India ==
The voice vote (ध्वनि मत) is used in the Lok Sabha, the Rajya Sabha and state assemblies to vote for certain resolutions. It is used when there is a wide agreement on issues and in some cases where the house is not in order. It was used during the formation of the Indian state of Telangana in 2014.

== United Kingdom ==
A voice vote is held to decide if a bill can progress through to the next stage.

The Speaker of the House of Commons will then propose the question by saying, for example (second reading): "The Question is, that the Bill be now read a second time". The Speaker then invites supporters of the bill to say "aye" and then opponents say "no": "As many as are of that opinion say 'aye' [supporters say 'aye'], of the contrary 'no' [opponents say 'no']". In what is known as collecting the voices the Speaker makes a judgement as to the louder cry. A clear majority either way will prompt the response "I think the Ayes/Noes have it. The Ayes/Noes have it!" (this can be forced to a division by continued cries either way). If the result is at all in doubt a division will be called and the speaker will say "Division, Clear the Lobbies!"

In the House of Lords, the Lord Speaker will propose the question by saying, for example (second reading): "The Question is, that the Bill be now read a second time". The Lord Speaker then does similarly to the Commons Speaker, by saying, "As many as are of that opinion say 'Content' [supporters say 'Content'] and of the contrary 'Not Content' [opponents say 'Not Content]." The Lord Speaker then decides. In the result of a division, the Lord Speaker will say "Division. Clear the Bar".

== United States ==
Robert's Rules of Order Newly Revised (11th edition) provides that:

A vote by voice is the regular method of voting on any motion that does not require more than a majority vote for its adoption. In taking a voice vote, the chair puts the question by saying, "The question is on the adoption of the motion to [or "that"] ... [repeating or clearly identifying the motion]. Those in favor of the motion, say aye. [Pausing for response,] Those opposed, say no." (Alternative forms are: "All those in favor..."; "All in favor..."; or the wording formerly prescribed by Congress, "As many as are in favor...") In the case of a resolution, the question may be put as follows: "The question is on the adoption of the following resolution: [reading it]. Those in favor of adopting the resolution that was just read, say aye...Those opposed, say no." If the question has been read very recently and there appears no desire to have it read again, the chair may use this form: "The question is on the adoption of the resolution last read. "Those in favor of adopting the resolution, say aye...Those opposed, say no."

In Congress, "the vast majority of actions decided by a voice vote" are ones for which "a strong or even overwhelming majority favors one side", or even unanimous consent. Members can request a division of the assembly (a rising vote, where each sides rise in turn to be counted), and one-fifth of members can demand a recorded vote on any question, after the chair announces the result of a voice vote.

It is estimated that more than 95 percent of the resolutions passed by state legislatures are passed by a unanimous voice vote, many without discussion; this is because resolutions are often on routine, noncontroversial matters, such as commemorating important events or recognizing groups.

== Other methods ==
- Humming is used as a voice vote method at the IETF (Internet Engineering Task Force) to estimate the participants' positions on some issues.

== See also ==
- Voting methods in deliberative assemblies
- Acclamation
