= Division bell =

Bell rung in a parliament to signal a division

In some of the Commonwealth realms, a division bell is a bell rung in or around parliament to signal a division (a vote) to members of the relevant chamber so that they may participate. A division bell may also be used to signal the start or end of parliamentary proceedings, and often produces different sounds or coloured lights to identify the chamber affected.

== In the United Kingdom ==
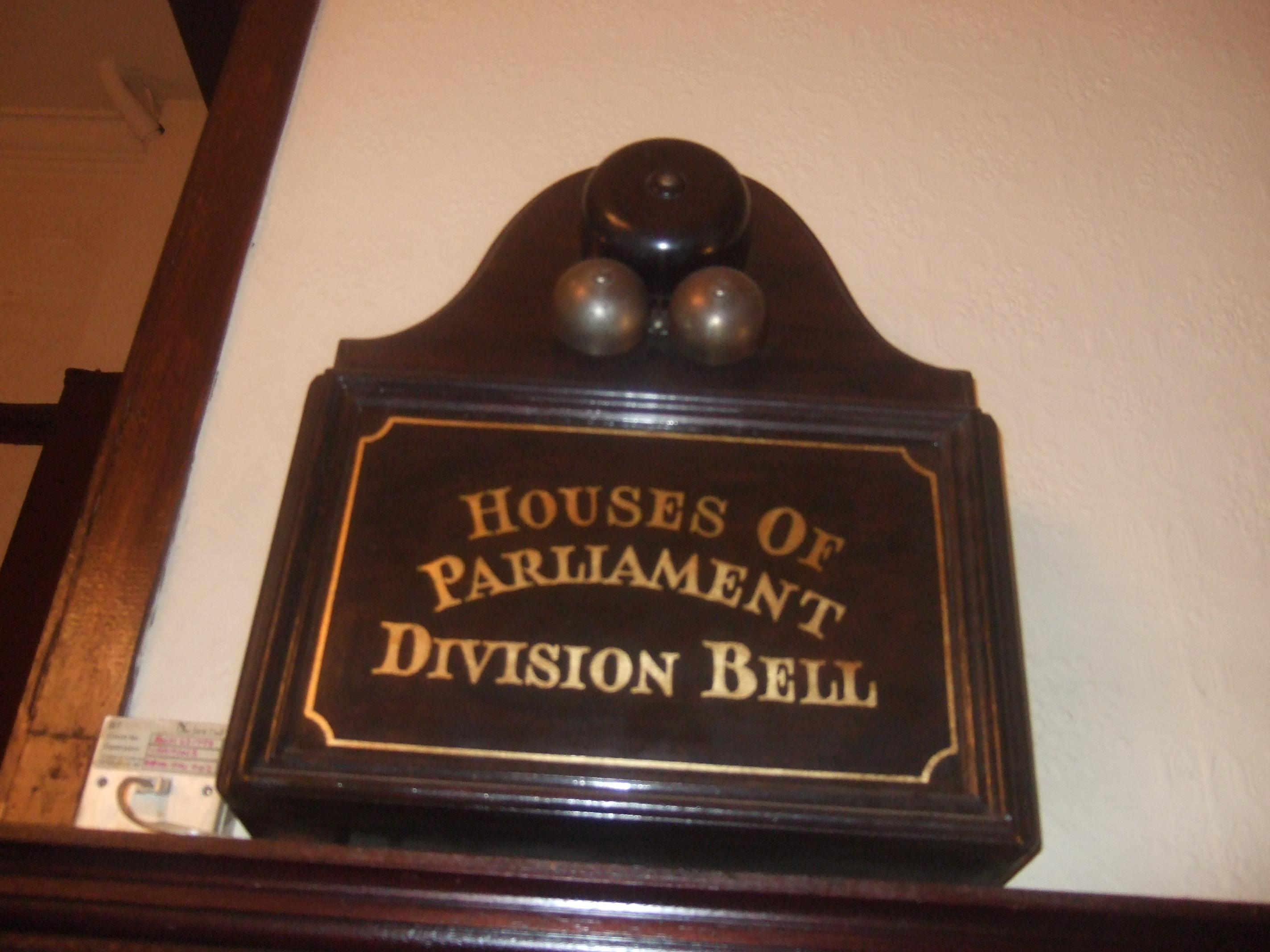
Houses of Parliament Division bell

In the United Kingdom, division bells are used in the immediate neighbourhood of the Palace of Westminster (housing Parliament) to signal that a division is occurring and that members of the House of Commons or of the House of Lords have eight minutes to get to their chosen division lobby to vote for or against the resolution. The call for a division is also displayed on annunciator screens throughout the Palace of Westminster. The division bells are also sounded at the start of a daily sitting, at the end of the two-minute prayers that start each day, and when the house rises. Division bells have been used in this way in the United Kingdom since 1858.

As of 2014, there were 384 division bells within the Parliamentary estate, and 172 outside it. Bells outside of the parliamentary estate are undergoing a phase out as of 2021.

Some Members may be in nearby offices, restaurants, pubs or shops, and therefore some of these establishments have their own division bells connected to those in the Houses of Parliament. MPs including Alec Douglas-Home, Michael Portillo and Michael Heseltine reportedly had division bells fitted in their homes.

Though the Commons and Lords share division bells, they are driven from separate ringing generator systems, so that the bells make noticeably different ring patterns for a division of the House of Commons and a division of the House of Lords.

The generator for the House of Commons simultaneously sounds all the division bells with a 2 Hertz signal (i.e., twice per second) for exactly eight minutes, though this has been varied by the House of Commons in response to the COVID-19 pandemic. As soon as the bells stop, the door keepers manning the entrances to the two division lobbies close and lock the doors. Any member who has failed to enter the lobby in time has lost the opportunity to vote in that division. Thus anywhere within an eight-minute journey of the Palace of Westminster is often said to be in the "division-bell area".

A broadcast of the BBC's Antiques Roadshow in October 2007 from the Banqueting House in Whitehall featured the original Ringing Generator System Number 1 from the House of Commons. The programme's expert, Paul Atterbury, with the help of former House of Commons Speaker Baroness Betty Boothroyd, demonstrated the apparatus in use with one of the original Division Bells. The show valued the transmitter at £15,000.

Three Ringing Generator Systems were made at the end of the 19th century by the GPO at the request of the Government. They were numbered 1, 2 and 3. Numbers 2 and 3 were destroyed by a bomb in 1941 and replaced with copies bearing the numbers 4 and 5. Number 5 generator exists, but the whereabouts of number 4 is not known. The current generator is entirely electronic.

=== External division bells ===
There are 172 division bells located outside the Palace of Westminster, in nearby government offices and even MPs' private residences. Public establishments fitted with division bells (as of 2013) include:

- Osteria Dell'Angolo, Marsham St
- Hispaniola Restaurant, Victoria Embankment
- St. Ermin's Hotel, Caxton St.
- St. James Court Hotel, Buckingham Gate
- National Liberal Club, Whitehall Place
- Green's Restaurant, Marsham St.
- Red Lion Public House, Parliament St.
- St. Germain Restaurant, Royal Westminster Hotel, Buckingham Palace Road
- The Cinnamon Club, 30 Great Smith St.
- Royal Horseguards Hotel, Whitehall Place
- Quilon Restaurant, 41 Buckingham Gate
- Quirinale Restaurant, 1 Great Peter St.
- Marquis of Granby public house, 41 Romney St.
- Vitello d'Oro Restaurant, Church House
- St. Stephen's Tavern, 10 Bridge St.
- Westminster Arms, 9–10 Storey's Gate

The bells are connected by telephone lines, and proprietors of these establishments are responsible for the maintenance of the bells.

== In Australia ==
Both State and Federal Parliament buildings use electronic division bells. In most states with bicameral parliaments, and in the Federal Parliament, red and green lights near the division bells flash to indicate which house is being called. Queensland and the Territories, which have unicameral parliaments, do not require the red light which indicates the upper house. In the Parliament of New South Wales, the division bell rings differently for divisions in the Assembly and the council.

The bells are typically rung at the beginning of a sitting, because a member has challenged a vote (called a division), or because there are not enough members in the chamber to constitute quorum.

=== Federal Parliament ===
In both the Senate and the House of Representatives, the division bell is normally rung for four minutes, unless successive divisions are taken with no debate between, in which case they ring for one minute only. After this period has elapsed, the doors to the chamber are locked, and the vote takes place. The duration of the bell was increased to four minutes following the move to Parliament House in 1988, and is measured by in the House of Representatives using a sandglass. On one occasion, a young Paul Keating was furiously censured by his party's whip for missing a division. Keating made the excuse that he could not hear the division bell in his office, when in fact he had simply turned it down.

== In Canada ==
An electronic division bell rings in the Ontario Legislative Assembly

The electronic bell of the House of Commons sounds to call members of the House for a sitting, a vote, or to announce the lack of a quorum. In the case of a vote, it is referred to as the division bell.

The Ontario Legislative Assembly makes use of an electronic voting bell, combined with visual lights, to indicate an upcoming vote. Bells are spread throughout the legislative building and rung for either 5, 10, or 30 minutes, depending on the nature of the vote.
