= Courtyard, Hereford =

Theatre and arts venue in England

Coordinates: 52.061°N 2.719°W

The Courtyard Centre For The Arts
- The Courtyard
- Interactive map of The Courtyard Centre For The Arts
- Address: Edgar Street; Hereford; United Kingdom
- Capacity: 400 seats on 2 levels (main house); 120 seats (studio)
- Production: Various

Construction
- Opened: 1998
- Architect: Glenn Howells

Website
- www.courtyard.org.uk

The Courtyard Centre for the Arts is a theatre and arts venue in Hereford, England, located on Edgar Street just outside the city centre. The building was constructed between 1997 and 1998 on the site of another theatre; The New Hereford Theatre, a converted swimming baths which had become outdated. It hosts in-house shows, such as a pantomime and productions by a youth theatre and a community company, alongside national tours. It is also one of the main sites for the annual Borderlines Film Festival.

== Details ==
The New Hereford Theatre was a converted swimming baths which had become outdated. Planning for the replacement building began in 1993 and received a significant boost when the Lottery Commission provided £3.75 million towards the fund. The glass and wooden building was designed by Glenn Howells, following selection through an architectural design competition managed by RIBA Competitions, and opened on 18 September 1998 after a ribbon-cutting ceremony by Jonathan Stone, then artistic director. The design of the Main House is based upon the shape of an Elizabethan Courtyard or Inn Yard Theatre, from which the building takes its name.

The building contains a Studio theatre in addition to its Main House (and both double as cinemas), an art gallery and two conference rooms, on the ground and first floor. There is a rehearsal room/dance studio on the second floor. It has a total seating capacity of approximately 520, in both of its venues. The studio has a third role as a lecture hall; it was from here that David Cameron launched his LibDems 4 Cameron campaign in December 2005. There is also a licensed Cafe-Bar which hosts a number of free events such as 'Jazz Cafe', 'Sunday Social' and 'Open Mike Night'.

Between 1998 and 2004 the centre received approximately 1.2 million visitors and in 1999 it was described as being an "ultra-cool, rigorously modern" building.

The Courtyard's patrons include Sir Derek Jacobi and Jo Brand.
