= Liverpool porcelain =

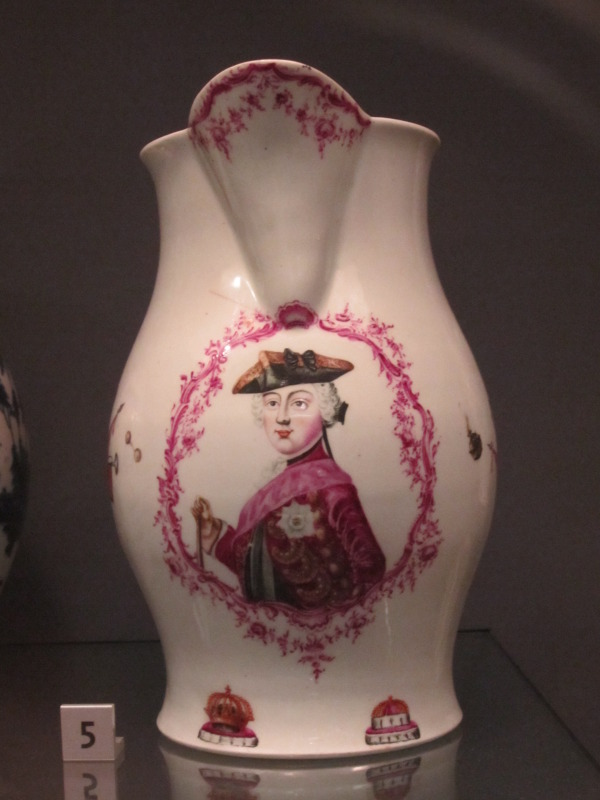
Jug, Richard Chaffers' factory, Liverpool, around 1760. Painted with Frederick II of Prussia.

Liverpool porcelain is mostly of the soft-paste porcelain type and was produced between about 1754 and 1804 in various factories in Liverpool. Tin-glazed English delftware had been produced in Liverpool from at least 1710 at numerous potteries, but some then switched to making porcelain. A portion of the output was exported, mainly to North America and the Caribbean.

The factories produced a great variety of wares and some figures. However the main production was underglaze blue and white porcelain with the fashionable Oriental designs, which Liverpool delftware painters were already well used to. Some transfer-printed wares, both overglaze and underglaze, were made as well as polychrome overglaze "enamelled" decorated pieces.

Liverpool porcelain is characterized by foot-rims vertical or undercut on the inner surface; flat bases to mugs; areas of blue ground marbled in gold; a blued glaze giving a 'thundercloud' effect where thick under the base. There are no factory marks for the Liverpool concerns although a mark on later wares is sometimes seen in under-glaze blue with the initials HP.

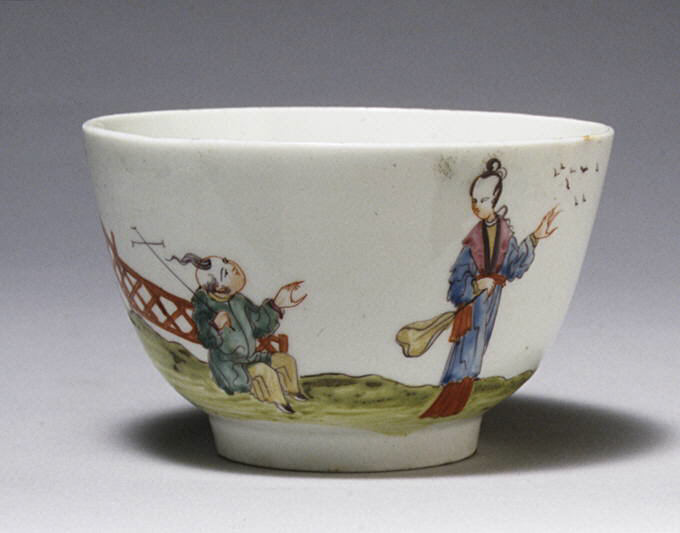
Chinoiserie bowl, c. 1765

English Liverpool pottery and porcelain is not to be confused with the products of East Liverpool, Ohio, a large American pottery centre, especially from about 1880 to 1960, was said to be known as the "Pottery Capital of the World" (at least in the American Mid-West).

== Factories ==
The factories included:

- Richard Chaffers (1754–65)
- Samuel Gilbody (1754–61)
- William Reid (1755–61)
- Phillip Christian (1765–78)
- William Ball (1763 –?
- James Pennington (1763–73)
- John & Jane Pennington (1770–94)
- Seth Pennington & John Part (1778–1803)

=== Richard Chaffers & Co ===
Richard Chaffers made soapstone-type porcelain featuring mainly Oriental designs at Shaw's Brow. An advertisement for it in 1756 provides the earliest documentation of Liverpool porcelain production, which he continued until his death in 1765. In 1756 he also held a licence to mine soapstone at a site in Cornwall. The porcelain resembles Worcester porcelain. Most of the plates made by the factory are octagonal, and some tea and coffee sets are six-sided. A common product was a bulbous mug with an incised cordon above the foot, enamelled with a Chinese scene in polychrome. Philip Christian & Co took over the factory when Richard Chaffers died and produced similar designs until 1778.

=== Samuel Gilbody ===
Next door to Chaffers, Samuel Gilbody took over his father's earthenware business and switched to the production of enamelled porcelain at his "China Manufactory" on Shaw's Brow, Liverpool, from about 1755 until his bankruptcy in 1760. His factory is probably one of two shown on a 1769 map of Liverpool.

=== William Reid ===
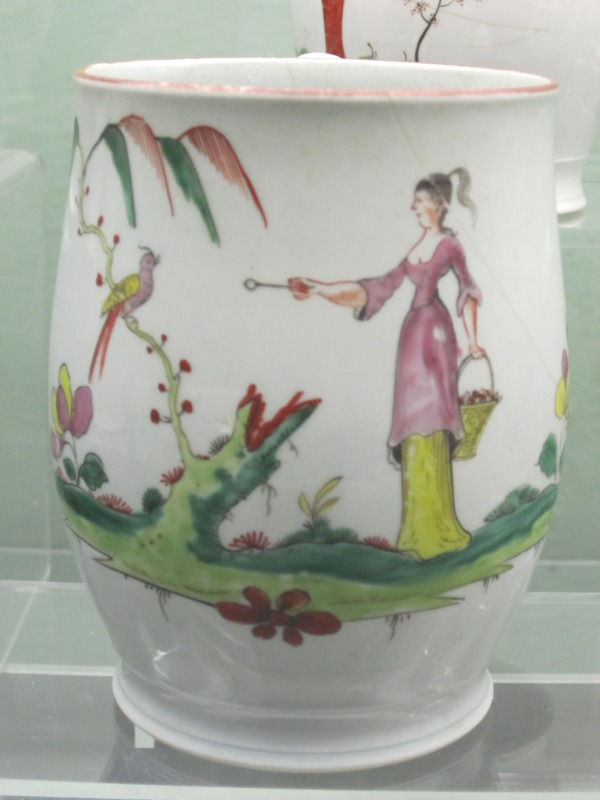
Cup, 1756-1761, William Reid and Co of Brownlow Hill, Liverpool.

The third manufacturer was William Reid of Brownlow Hill. On 12 November 1756 his first advert for porcelain produced in Liverpool appeared in the Liverpool Advertiser. He used an underglaze blue Oriental designs on an almost opaque body. It read:

'Liverpool China Manufactory of Messrs Reid and Co, proprietors of the China Manufactory, have opened their warehouse in Castle Street and sell all kinds of blue and white china ware, not inferior to any made in England, both wholesale and retail'.

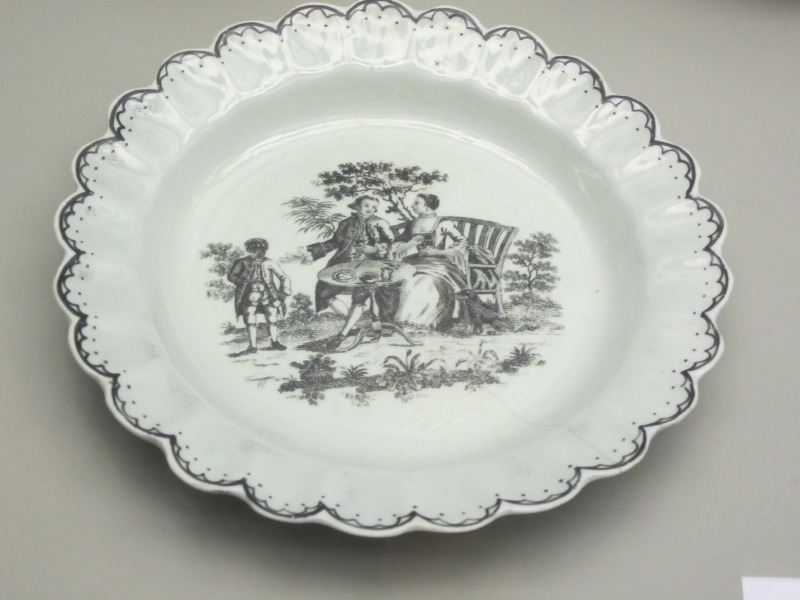
Transfer-printed plate from the James Pennington factory.

The company went bankrupt in June 1761 but the business continued under William Ball, before it was sold in July 1763 to Thomas Lewis, and was then leased to James Pennington and Co. The Pennington family, James, John and Seth continued to produce porcelain on the site until around 1767/1768 when they moved the factory to Park Lane until 1773. John Pennington also had two porcelain Factories: Copperas Hill c. 1770–79 and Folly Lane 1779–86 which was continued by his widow Jane until 1794.

=== William Ball ===
William Ball used a soapstone porcelain with a glossy glaze to give a shiny ('sticky') appearance, as did the Penningtons, to his Chinese patterns with a blue under-glaze.

=== Other factories ===
For a short time, at the close of the eighteenth century (1790–95), the partnership of Thomas Wolfe with Mason & Lucock made hybrid-hard-paste porcelain of a type first produced at New Hall in Staffordshire, at the Islington China Works.

The Herculaneum factory was established in 1796 by Samuel Worthington at first producing some earthenware and stoneware with workers from Staffordshire but produced some porcelain, mainly tea-ware around 1800.

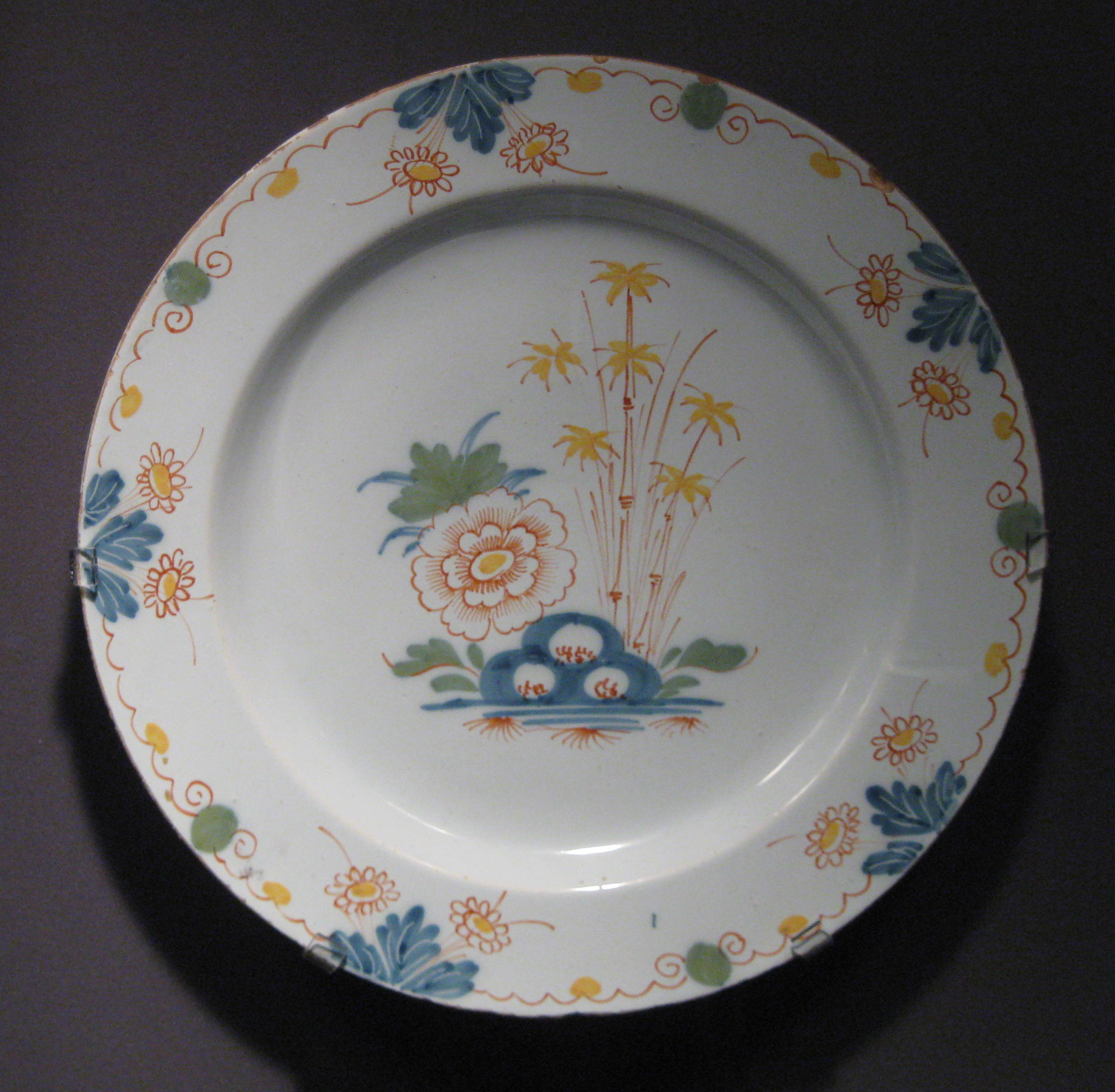
Plate, c. 1765, Liverpool (or London)

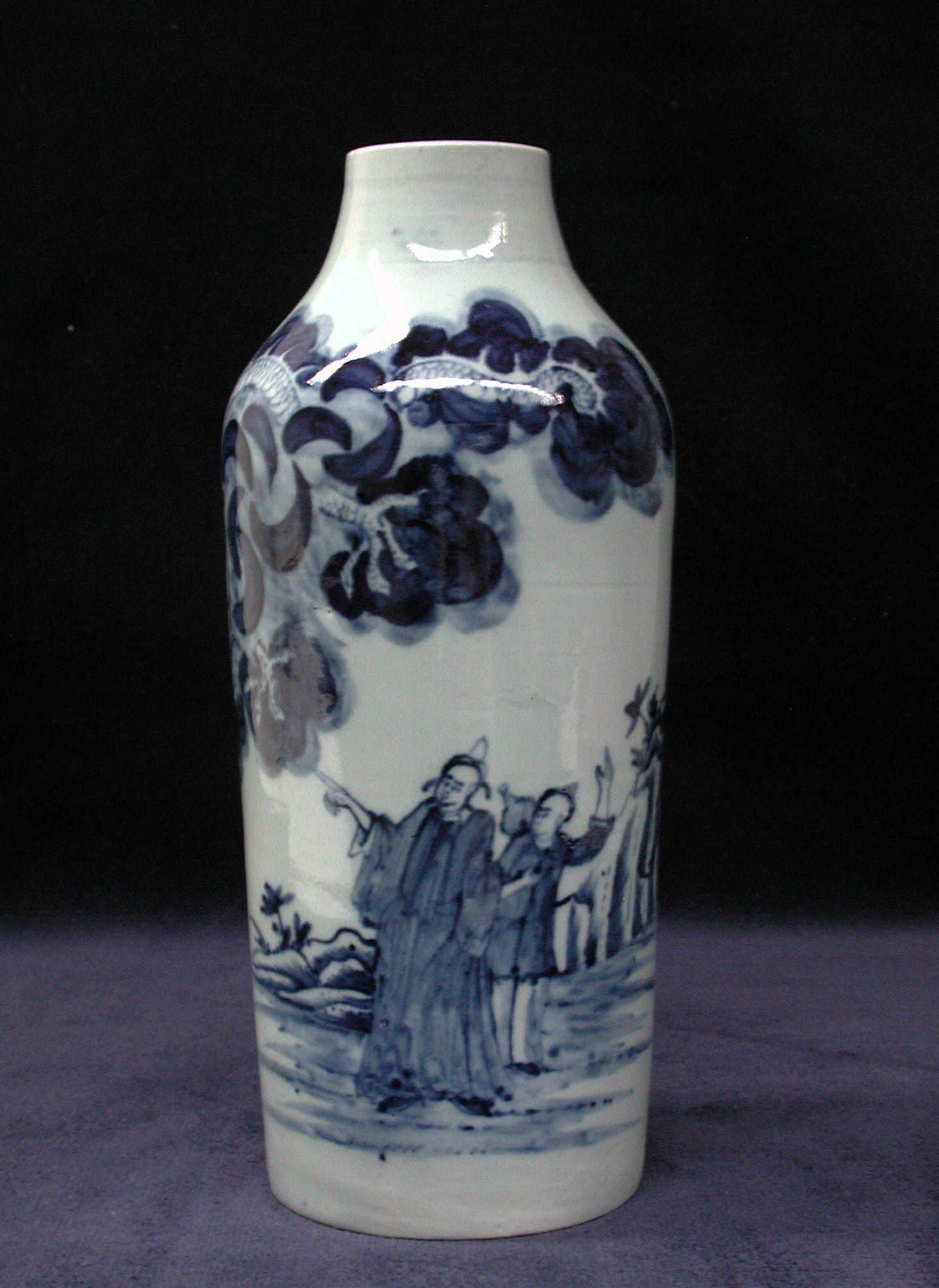
Vase, c. 1770

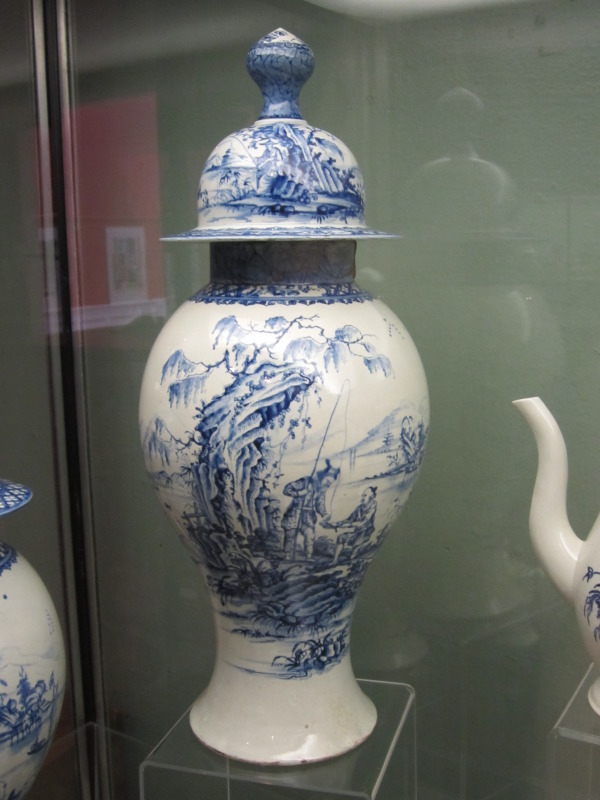
Vase by John and Jane Pennington, late 18th-century

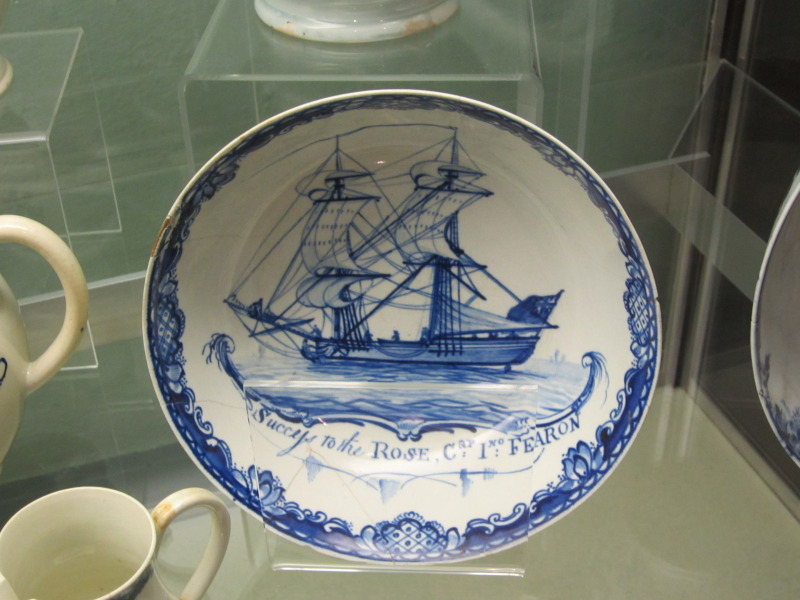
Commemorative "ship bowl" for punch, a common Liverpool form. John and Jane Pennington, late 18th-century

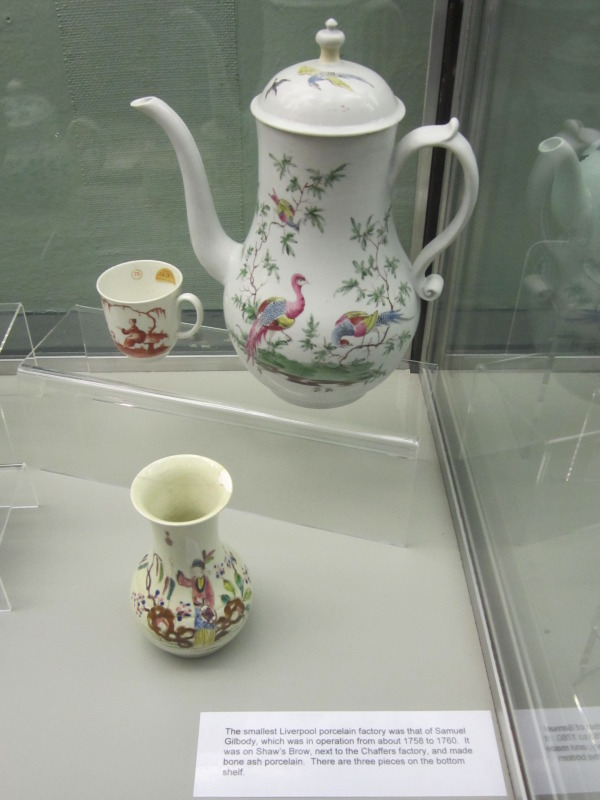
Samuel Gilbody, 1758–60
