= Non-textual amendment =

In legislatures, more commonly in parliaments, a non-textual amendment is an amendment that alters the meaning or scope of operation of a piece of legislation, but without changing the text. This is done by creating a provision that refers to another provision. It contrasts with a "textual amendment" that directly changes the wording.

For a non-textual amendment, both the original provision and the new provision would have to be read together to have a complete understanding of the item.

== Example ==
For example, a statement could say, "All cats are allowed." In this case, a textual amendment could be made so that the statement says, "All dogs are allowed."

A non-textual amendment would not change the original statement. Instead, it would be another statement like, "The statement shall apply to dogs as it would apply to cats." This statement would have to be read in conjunction with the original statement, "All cats are allowed", to get the full meaning.

== See also ==
- Shell bill
- Substitute amendment
