= 1980 Virginia ballot measures =

The 1980 Virginia State Elections took place on Election Day, November 4, 1980, the same day as the U.S. Presidential and U.S. House elections in the state. The only statewide elections on the ballot were four constitutional referendums to amend the Virginia State Constitution. Because Virginia state elections are held on off-years, no statewide officers or state legislative elections were held. All referendums were referred to the voters by the Virginia General Assembly.

== Question 1 ==
This amendment asked voters to authorize the Virginia General Assembly to convene for a limited period of time to consider legislation if it is vetoed by the Governor of Virginia. This makes it slightly easier for the General Assembly to override such vetoes.

Question 1
Choice	Votes	%
For	792,206	59.03
Against	549,732	40.97
Total	1,341,938	100.00
Source: - Official Results

== Question 2 ==
This amendment asked voters to decrease the maximum debt a local city or town may incur.

Question 2
Choice	Votes	%
For	852,560	65.68
Against	445,511	34.32
Total	1,298,071	100.00
Source: - Official Results

== Question 3 ==
This amendment asked voters to give the Virginia General Assembly the ability to permit certain personal property tax exemptions for residents who are at least 65 years old or have a disability.

Question 3
Choice	Votes	%
For	1,089,083	81.45
Against	248,044	18.55
Total	1,337,127	100.00
Source: - Official Results
