= 1982 Virginia ballot measures =

The 1982 Virginia State Elections took place on Election Day, November 2, 1982, the same day as the U.S. House elections in the state. The only statewide elections on the ballot were three constitutional referendums to amend the Virginia State Constitution. Because Virginia state elections are held on off-years, no statewide officers or state legislative elections were held. All referendums were referred to the voters by the Virginia General Assembly.

== Question 1 ==
This amendment asked voters to change the information required to register to vote by deleting marital status and occupation and by including any prior legal name.

Question 1
Choice	Votes	%
For	634,533	58.13
Against	456,975	41.87
Total	1,091,508	100.00
Source: - Official Results

== Question 2 ==
This amendment would have changed Section 1 of Article II to authorize restoration of civil rights to felons as may be provided by general law. However, it was rejected by voters.

Question 2
Choice	Votes	%
For	396,322	36.63
Against	685,753	63.37
Total	1,082,075	100.00
Source: - Official Results

== Question 3 ==
This amendment would have authorized the Virginia General Assembly to limit the introduction of legislation in odd-years, when legislative sessions are shorter. Voters did not approve of the amendment and it was rejected.

Question 3
Choice	Votes	%
For	370,563	34.97
Against	689,085	65.03
Total	1,059,648	100.00
Source: - Official Results
