= Animal welfare =

Well-being of non-human animals

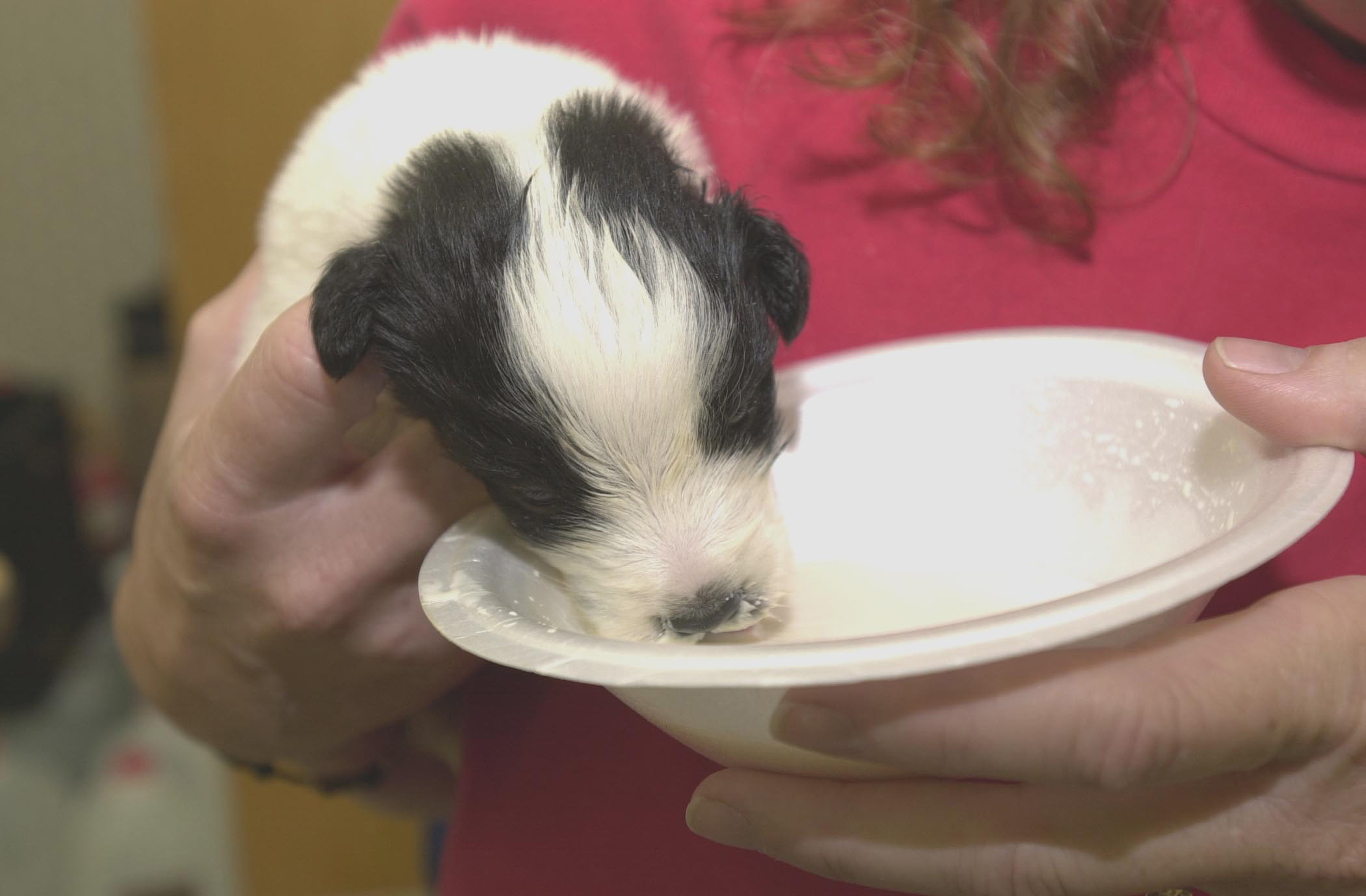
A four-week-old puppy, found alongside a road after flooding in West Virginia, United States, is fed at an Emergency Animal Rescue Service shelter in the Twin Falls State Park.

Animal welfare is the quality of life and overall well-being of animals. Formal standards of animal welfare vary between contexts, but are debated mostly by animal welfare groups, legislators, and academics. Animal welfare science uses measures such as longevity, disease, immunosuppression, behavior, physiology, and reproduction, although there is debate about which of these best indicate animal welfare.

Respect for animal welfare is often based on the belief that nonhuman animals are sentient and that consideration should be given to their well-being or suffering, especially when they are under the care of humans. These concerns can include how animals are slaughtered for food, how they are used in scientific research, how they are kept (as pets, in zoos, farms, circuses, etc.), and how human activities affect the welfare and survival of wild species.

There are two forms of criticism of the concept of animal welfare, coming from diametrically opposite positions. One view, held by some thinkers in history, holds that humans have no duties of any kind to animals. The other view is based on the animal rights position that animals should not be regarded as objects and any use of animals by humans is unacceptable. Accordingly, some animal rights proponents argue that the perception of better animal welfare is used as an excuse for continued exploitation of animals. Some authorities therefore treat animal welfare and animal rights as two opposing positions. Others see animal welfare gains as incremental steps towards animal rights.

== History, principles, and practice ==
Animal protection laws were enacted as early as the 1st millennium BCE in India. Several Indian kings built hospitals for animals, and emperor Ashoka (304–232 BCE) issued orders against hunting and animal slaughter, in line with ahimsa, the doctrine of nonviolence. The institutionalization of early animal welfare in the Indian subcontinent was profoundly shaped by Jainism, which elevated noviolence to its supreme ethical principle. Driven by the belief that all living beings possess a soul and the capacity to suffer, ancient Jain communities established the world's first widespread network of animal sanctuaries and charitable hospitals, known as panjrapoles. Funded primarily by wealthy Jain merchant guilds, these institutions were dedicated to sheltering, feeding, and medically treating sick, aging, and rescued animals, particularly cattle and birds, rather than euthanizing them. This highly organized Jain welfare framework deeply influenced the broader cultural and legislative approach to animal ethics throughout early Indian history.

In the 13th century CE, Genghis Khan protected wildlife in Mongolia during the breeding season (March to October).

Early legislation in the Western world on behalf of animals includes the Ireland Parliament (Thomas Wentworth) "An Act against Plowing by the Tayle, and pulling the Wooll off living Sheep", 1635, and the Massachusetts Colony (Nathaniel Ward) "Off the Bruite Creatures" Liberty 92 and 93 in the "Massachusetts Body of Liberties" of 1641. In the Edo period of Japan, Tokugawa Tsunayoshi (1646 - 1709) instituted several laws relating to animal welfare, particularly towards dogs, earning him the nickname of "the dog Shogun".

In 1776, English clergyman Humphrey Primatt authored A Dissertation on the Duty of Mercy and Sin of Cruelty to Brute Animals, one of the first books published in support of animal welfare. Marc Bekoff said that "Primatt was largely responsible for bringing animal welfare to the attention of the general public."

Since 1822, when Irish MP Richard Martin brought the "Cruel Treatment of Cattle Act 1822" through Parliament offering protection from cruelty to cattle, horses, and sheep, an animal welfare movement has been active in England. Martin was among the founders of the world's first animal welfare organization, the Society for the Prevention of Cruelty to Animals, or SPCA, in 1824. In 1840, Queen Victoria gave the society her blessing, and it became the RSPCA. The society used members' donations to employ a growing network of inspectors, whose job was to identify abusers, gather evidence, and report them to the authorities.

In 1837, the German minister Albert Knapp founded the first German animal welfare society.

One of the first national laws to protect animals was the UK Cruelty to Animals Act 1835 followed by the Protection of Animals Act 1911. In the US it was many years until there was a national law to protect animals—the Animal Welfare Act of 1966—although there were a number of states that passed anti-cruelty laws between 1828 and 1898. In India, animals are protected by the "Prevention of Cruelty to Animals Act, 1960".

Significant progress in animal welfare did not take place until the late 20th century. In 1965, the UK government commissioned an investigation—led by professor Roger Brambell—into the welfare of intensively farmed animals, partly in response to concerns raised in Ruth Harrison's 1964 book, Animal Machines. On the basis of Brambell's report, the UK government set up the Farm Animal Welfare Advisory Committee in 1967, which became the Farm Animal Welfare Council in 1979. The committee's first guidelines recommended that animals require the freedom to "stand up, lie down, turn around, groom themselves and stretch their limbs." The guidelines have since been elaborated upon to become known as the Five Freedoms.

In the UK, the Animal Welfare Act 2006 (c. 45) consolidated many different forms of animal welfare legislation.

A number of animal welfare organisations are campaigning to achieve a Universal Declaration on Animal Welfare (UDAW) at the United Nations. In principle, the Universal Declaration would call on the United Nations to recognise animals as sentient beings, capable of experiencing pain and suffering, and to recognise that animal welfare is an issue of importance as part of the social development of nations worldwide. The campaign to achieve the UDAW is being coordinated by World Animal Protection, with a core working group including Compassion in World Farming, the RSPCA, and the Humane Society International (the international branch of HSUS).

The 2019 UN Global Sustainable Development Report identified animal welfare as one of several key missing issues in the 2030 Agenda for Sustainable Development.

== Animal welfare science ==
Animal welfare science is an emerging field that seeks to answer questions raised by the keeping and use of animals, such as whether hens are frustrated when confined in cages, whether the psychological well-being of animals in laboratories can be maintained, and whether zoo animals are stressed by the transport required for international conservation.

Within the context of animal research, many scientific organisations believe that improved animal welfare will provide improved scientific outcomes. If an animal in a laboratory is suffering stress or pain it could negatively affect the results of the research. If a researcher wants to conduct an experiment, they must meet up with the 3R's (replacement, reduction, and refinement). They must show how they're going to put their plan into action. The ethics committee are to review the plan and check if all principles are being followed and ensure the benefits justify the harm of these animals. The 3R's are meant to lessen the use of animals in research and lessen any suffering.

The volume of scientific research on animal welfare has also increased significantly in some countries.

=== Animal consciousness ===
The predominant view of modern neuroscientists is that consciousness exists in nonhuman animals. However, some maintain that consciousness is a philosophical question that may never be scientifically resolved.

A 2021 study devised a way to dissociate conscious from nonconscious perception in animals. The researchers built experiments predicting opposite behavioral outcomes depending on whether a visual cue is perceived consciously or nonconsciously. The monkeys' behaviors displayed these exact opposite signatures, just like aware and unaware humans tested in the study.

== Animal welfare issues ==
- Animal testing
- Abandoned pets
- Bambi effect
- Behavioral enrichment
- Blood sport
- Cruelty to animals
- Feral cat
- Hunting
- Overpopulation in companion animals
- Overview of discretionary invasive procedures on animals
- Poaching
- Puppy mills
- Whaling
- Hypertype

=== Farmed animals ===
Land animals slaughtered for meat

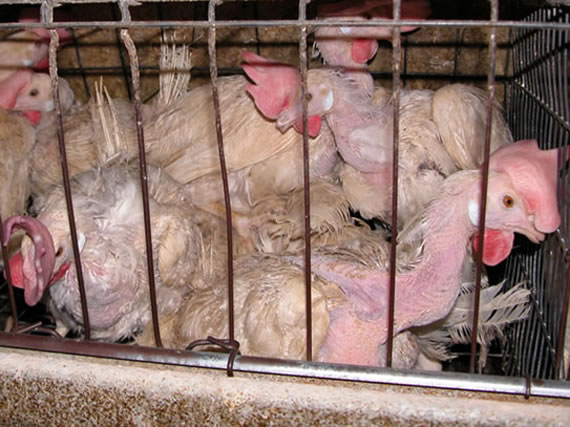
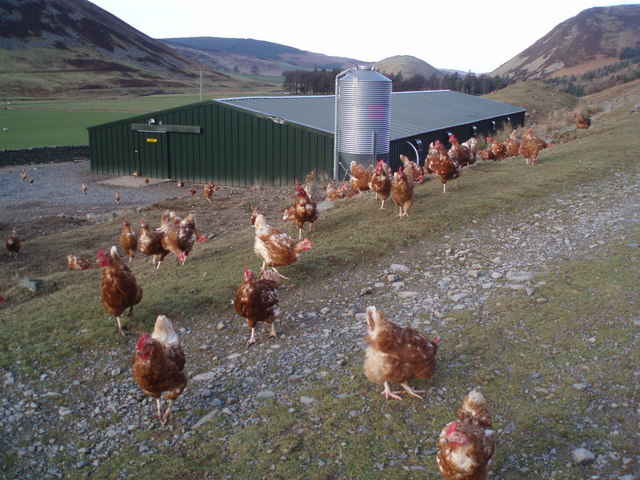

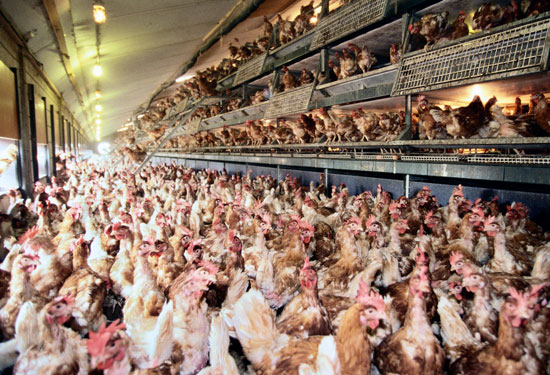
The welfare of egg laying hens in battery cages (top) can be compared with the welfare of free range hens (middle and bottom) which are given access to the outdoors. However, animal welfare groups argue that the vast majority of free-range hens are still intensively confined (bottom) and are rarely able to go outdoors.

A major concern for the welfare of farmed animals is factory farming in which large numbers of animals are reared in confinement at high stocking densities. Issues include the limited opportunities for natural behaviors, for example, in battery cages, veal and gestation crates, instead producing abnormal behaviors such as tail-biting, cannibalism, and feather pecking, and routine invasive procedures such as beak trimming, castration, and ear notching.More extensive methods of farming, e.g. free range, can also raise welfare concerns such as the mulesing of sheep and predation of stock by wild animals. Biosecurity is also a risk with free range farming, as it allows for more contact between livestock and wild animal populations, which may carry zoonoses.

Farmed animals are artificially selected for production parameters which sometimes impinge on the animals' welfare. For example, broiler chickens are bred to be very large to produce the greatest quantity of meat per animal. Broilers bred for fast growth have a high incidence of leg deformities because the large breast muscles cause distortions of the developing legs and pelvis, and the birds cannot support their increased body weight. As a consequence, they frequently become lame or suffer from broken legs. The increased body weight also puts a strain on their hearts and lungs, and ascites often develop. In the UK alone, up to 20 million broilers each year die from the stress of catching and transporting before reaching the slaughterhouse. This stress can be measured by the high heart rates and cortisol levels, but it can also be seen in their behavior or physical changes. In situations where they are threatened, alone, or can't interact with others, these results are common. Animal welfare violations have been observed more in intensively bred chicken, pig and cattle species, respectively, and studies and laws have been enacted in this regard. However, animal welfare in semi-intensive species such as sheep and goats is nowadays being scrutinised and gaining importance.

Another concern about the welfare of farmed animals is the method of slaughter, especially ritual slaughter. While the killing of animals need not necessarily involve suffering, the general public considers that killing an animal reduces its welfare. This leads to further concerns about premature slaughtering such as chick culling by the laying hen industry, in which males are slaughtered immediately after hatching because they are superfluous; this policy occurs in other farmed animal industries such as the production of goat and cattle milk, raising the same concerns.

A 2023 report by the Animal Welfare Institute found that animal welfare claims by companies selling meat and poultry products lack adequate substantiation in roughly 85% of analyzed cases.

=== Cetaceans ===
Captive cetaceans are kept for display, research and naval operations. To enhance their welfare, humans feed them fish that are dead but are disease-free, protect them from predators and injury, monitor their health, and provide activities for behavioral enrichment. Some are kept in lagoons with natural soil and vegetated sides. Most are in concrete tanks which are easy to clean but echo their natural sounds back to them. They cannot develop their own social groups, and related cetaceans are typically separated for display and breeding. Military dolphins used in naval operations swim free during operations and training and return to pens otherwise. Captive cetaceans are trained to present themselves for blood samples, health exams, and noninvasive breath samples above their blow holes. Staff can monitor the captives afterward for signs of infection from the procedure.

Research on wild cetaceans leaves them free to roam and make sounds in their natural habitat, eat live fish, face predators and injury, and form social groups voluntarily. However, boat engines of researchers, whale watchers and others add substantial noise to their natural environment, reducing their ability to echolocate and communicate. Electric engines are far quieter, but are not widely used for either research or whale watching, even for maintaining position, which does not require much power. Vancouver Port offers discounts for ships with quiet propeller and hull designs. Other areas have reduced speeds. Boat engines also have unshielded propellers, which cause serious injuries to cetaceans who come close to the propeller. The US Coast Guard has proposed rules on propeller guards to protect human swimmers, but has not adopted any rules. The US Navy uses propeller guards to protect manatees in Georgia. Ducted propellers provide more efficient drive at speeds up to 10 knots, and protect animals beneath and beside them, but need grilles to prevent injuries to animals drawn into the duct. Attaching satellite trackers and obtaining biopsies to measure pollution loads and DNA involve either capture and release, or shooting the cetaceans from a distance with dart guns. A cetacean was killed by a fungal infection after being darted, due to either an incompletely sterilized dart or an infection from the ocean entering the wound caused by the dart. Researchers on wild cetaceans have not yet been able to use drones to capture noninvasive breath samples.

Other harms to wild cetaceans include commercial whaling, aboriginal whaling, drift netting, ship collisions, water pollution, noise from sonar and reflection seismology, predators, loss of prey, and disease. Efforts to enhance the life of wild cetaceans, besides reducing those harms, include offering human music. Canadian rules do not forbid playing quiet music, though they forbid "noise that may resemble whale songs or calls, underwater".

=== Wild animal welfare ===
In addition to cetaceans, the welfare of other wild animals has also been studied, though to a lesser extent than that of animals in farms. Research in wild animal welfare has two focuses: the welfare of wild animals kept in captivity and the welfare of animals living in the wild. The former has addressed the situation of animals kept both for human use, as in zoos or circuses, or in rehabilitation centers. The latter has examined how the welfare of non-domesticated animals living in wild or urban areas are affected by humans or natural factors causing wild animal suffering.

Some of the proponents of these views have advocated carrying out conservation efforts in ways that respect the welfare of wild animals, within the framework of the disciplines of compassionate conservation and conservation welfare, while others have argued in favor of improving the welfare of wild animals for the sake of the animals, regardless of whether there are any conservation issues involved at all.

The welfare economist Yew-Kwang Ng, in his 1995 "Towards welfare biology: Evolutionary economics of animal consciousness and suffering", proposed welfare biology as a research field to study "living things and their environment with respect to their welfare (defined as net happiness, or enjoyment minus suffering)." Oscar Horta argued that the suffering of wild animals outweighs their happiness. He wrote that wild animals often have large offspring, with most of them dying young by starving or being eaten alive. According to Horta, the ethical reasons for wanting to improve human welfare also apply to wild animal welfare.

=== War ===
The Sudan Animal Rescue Centre, whose sanctuary is located southeast of the capital near a military base that saw heavy fighting during the war starting in 2023, warned that the situation at its facility was "critical", with no permanent staff to take care of its 25 lions and other animals, shortages of food and no electricity to power electric barriers for its enclosures.

== Legislation ==
=== European Union ===
The European Commission's activities in this area start with the recognition that animals are sentient beings. The general aim is to ensure that animals do not endure avoidable pain or suffering, and obliges the owner/keeper of animals to respect minimum welfare requirements. European Union legislation regarding farm animal welfare is regularly re-drafted according to science-based evidence and cultural views. For example, in 2009, legislation was passed which aimed to reduce animal suffering during slaughter and on 1 January 2012, the European Union Council Directive 1999/74/EC came into act, which means that conventional battery cages for laying hens are now banned across the Union.

==== United Kingdom ====
The Animal Welfare Act 2006 makes owners and keepers responsible for ensuring that the welfare needs of their animals are met. This law applies not only to pet owners but also to all industries involving animals, such as agriculture, entertainment, and research. Any activities and behaviors involving animals must comply with the welfare standards established by this law. These include the need: for a suitable environment (place to live), for a suitable diet, to exhibit normal behavior patterns, to be housed with, or apart from, other animals (if applicable), and to be protected from pain, injury, suffering and disease. Anyone who is cruel to an animal, or does not provide for its welfare needs, may be banned from owning animals, fined up to £20,000 and/or sent to prison for a maximum of six months.

In the UK, the welfare of research animals being used for "regulated procedures" was historically protected by the Animals (Scientific Procedures) Act 1986 (ASPA) which is administrated by the Home Office. The Act defines "regulated procedures" as animal experiments that could potentially cause "pain, suffering, distress or lasting harm" to "protected animals". Initially, "protected animals" encompassed all living vertebrates other than humans, but, in 1993, an amendment added a single invertebrate species, the common octopus.

Primates, cats, dogs, and horses have additional protection over other vertebrates under the Act. Revised legislation came into force in January 2013. This has been expanded to protect "...all living vertebrates, other than man, and any living cephalopod. Fish and amphibia are protected once they can feed independently and cephalopods at the point when they hatch. Embryonic and foetal forms of mammals, birds and reptiles are protected during the last third of their gestation or incubation period." The definition of regulated procedures was also expanded: "A procedure is regulated if it is carried out on a protected animal and may cause that animal a level of pain, suffering, distress or lasting harm equivalent to, or higher than, that caused by inserting a hypodermic needle according to good veterinary practice." It also includes modifying the genes of a protected animal if this causes the animal pain, suffering, distress, or lasting harm. The ASPA also considers other issues such as animal sources, housing conditions, identification methods, and the humane killing of animals.

Those applying for a license must explain why such research cannot be done through non-animal methods. The project must also pass an ethical review panel which aims to decide if the potential benefits outweigh any suffering for the animals involved.

=== United States ===
In the United States, a federal law called the Humane Slaughter Act was designed to decrease suffering of livestock during slaughter.

The Georgia Animal Protection Act of 1986 was a state law enacted in response to the inhumane treatment of companion animals by a pet store chain in Atlanta. The Act provided for the licensing and regulation of pet shops, stables, kennels, and animal shelters, and established, for the first time, minimum standards of care. Additional provisions, called the Humane Euthanasia Act, were added in 1990, and then further expanded and strengthened with the Animal Protection Act of 2000.

In 2002, voters passed (by a margin of 55% for and 45% against) Amendment 10 to the Florida Constitution banning the confinement of pregnant pigs in gestation crates. In 2006, Arizona voters passed Proposition 204 with 62% support; the legislation prohibits the confinement of calves in veal crates and breeding sows in gestation crates. In 2007, the Governor of Oregon signed legislation prohibiting the confinement of pigs in gestation crates and in 2008, the Governor of Colorado signed legislation that phased out both gestation crates and veal crates. Also during 2008, California passed Proposition 2, known as the "Prevention of Farm Animal Cruelty Act", which orders new space requirements for farm animals starting in 2015.

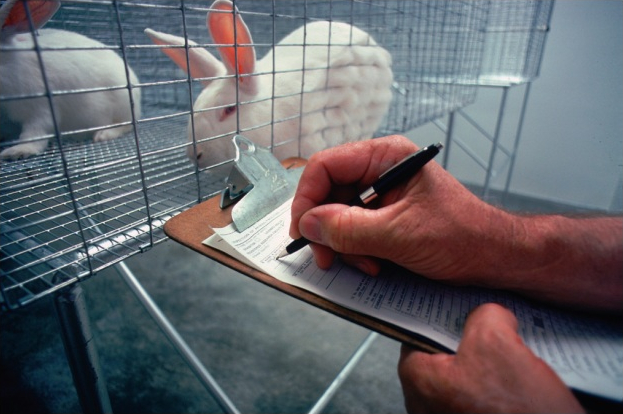
The use of animals in laboratories remains controversial. Animal welfare advocates push for enforced standards to ensure the health and safety of those animals used for tests.

In the US, every institution that uses vertebrate animals for federally funded laboratory research must have an Institutional Animal Care and Use Committee (IACUC). Each local IACUC reviews research protocols and conducts evaluations of the institution's animal care and use which includes the results of inspections of facilities that are required by law. The IACUC committee must assess the steps taken to "enhance animal well-being" before research can take place. This includes research on farm animals.

According to the National Institutes of Health Office of Laboratory Animal Welfare, researchers must try to minimize distress in animals whenever possible: "Animals used in research and testing may experience pain from induced diseases, procedures, and toxicity. The Public Health Service (PHS) Policy and Animal Welfare Regulations (AWRs) state that procedures that cause more than momentary or slight pain or distress should be performed with appropriate sedation, analgesia, or anesthesia.

However, research and testing studies sometimes involve pain that cannot be relieved with such agents because they would interfere with the scientific objectives of the study. Accordingly, federal regulations require that IACUCs determine that discomfort to animals will be limited to that which is unavoidable for the conduct of scientifically valuable research, and that unrelieved pain and distress will only continue for the duration necessary to accomplish the scientific objectives. The PHS Policy and AWRs further state that animals that would otherwise suffer severe or chronic pain and distress that cannot be relieved should be painlessly killed at the end of the procedure, or if appropriate, during the procedure."

The National Research Council's Guide for the Care and Use of Laboratory Animals also serves as a guide to improve welfare for animals used in research in the US. The Federation of Animal Science Societies' Guide for the Care and Use of Agricultural Animals in Research and Teaching is a resource addressing welfare concerns in farm animal research. Laboratory animals in the US are also protected under the Animal Welfare Act. The United States Department of Agriculture Animal and Plant Health Inspection Service (APHIS) enforces the Animal Welfare Act. APHIS and USDA help the animal welfare act by creating and updating new rules in the AWA regulations, licensing and checking in facilities, doing investigations for potential violations, and making sure everyone stays in line with the law.APHIS inspects animal research facilities regularly and reports are published online.

According to the U.S. Department of Agriculture (USDA), the total number of animals used in the U.S. in 2005 was almost 1.2 million, but this does not include rats, mice, and birds which are not covered by welfare legislation but make up approximately 90% of research animals.

== Approaches and definitions ==
There are many different approaches to describing and defining animal welfare.

Positive conditions – Providing good animal welfare is sometimes defined by a list of positive conditions which should be provided to the animal. This approach is taken by the Five Freedoms and the three principles of professor John Webster.

The Five Freedoms are:

- Freedom from thirst and hunger – by ready access to fresh water and a diet to maintain full health and vigour
- Freedom from discomfort – by providing an appropriate environment including shelter and a comfortable resting area
- Freedom from pain, injury, and disease – by prevention or rapid diagnosis and treatment
- Freedom to express most normal behavior – by providing sufficient space, proper facilities, and company of the animal's own kind
- Freedom from fear and distress – by ensuring conditions and treatment which avoid mental suffering

John Webster defines animal welfare by advocating three positive conditions: Living a natural life, being fit and healthy, and being happy.

High production – In the past, many have seen farm animal welfare chiefly in terms of whether the animal is producing well. The argument is that an animal in poor welfare would not be producing well, however, many farmed animals will remain highly productive despite being in conditions where good welfare is almost certainly compromised, e.g., layer hens in battery cages.

Emotion in animals – Others in the field, such as professor Ian Duncan and professor Marian Dawkins, focus more on the feelings of the animal. This approach indicates the belief that animals should be considered as sentient beings. Duncan wrote, "Animal welfare is to do with the feelings experienced by animals: the absence of strong negative feelings, usually called suffering, and (probably) the presence of positive feelings, usually called pleasure. In any assessment of welfare, it is these feelings that should be assessed." Dawkins wrote, "Let us not mince words: Animal welfare involves the subjective feelings of animals."

Welfare biology – Yew-Kwang Ng defines animal welfare in terms of welfare economics: "Welfare biology is the study of living things and their environment with respect to their welfare (defined as net happiness, or enjoyment minus suffering). Despite difficulties of ascertaining and measuring welfare and relevancy to normative issues, welfare biology is a positive science."

Dictionary definition – In the Saunders Comprehensive Veterinary Dictionary, animal welfare is defined as "the avoidance of abuse and exploitation of animals by humans by maintaining appropriate standards of accommodation, feeding and general care, the prevention and treatment of disease and the assurance of freedom from harassment, and unnecessary discomfort and pain."

American Veterinary Medical Association (AVMA) has defined animal welfare as: "An animal is in a good state of welfare if (as indicated by scientific evidence) it is healthy, comfortable, well nourished, safe, able to express innate behavior, and if it is not suffering from unpleasant states such as pain, fear, and distress." They have offered the following eight principles for developing and evaluating animal welfare policies.

- The responsible use of animals for human purposes, such as companionship, food, fiber, recreation, work, education, exhibition, and research conducted for the benefit of both humans and animals, is consistent with the Veterinarian's Oath.
- Decisions regarding animal care, use, and welfare shall be made by balancing scientific knowledge and professional judgment with consideration of ethical and societal values.
- Animals must be provided water, food, proper handling, health care, and an environment appropriate to their care and use, with thoughtful consideration for their species-typical biology and behavior.
- Animals should be cared for in ways that minimize fear, pain, stress, and suffering.
- Procedures related to animal housing, management, care, and use should be continuously evaluated, and when indicated, refined or replaced.
- Conservation and management of animal populations should be humane, socially responsible, and scientifically prudent.
- Animals shall be treated with respect and dignity throughout their lives and, when necessary, provided a humane death.
- The veterinary profession shall continually strive to improve animal health and welfare through scientific research, education, collaboration, advocacy, and the development of legislation and regulations.

Terrestrial Animal Health Code of World Organisation for Animal Health defines animal welfare as "how an animal is coping with the conditions in which it lives. An animal is in a good state of welfare if (as indicated by scientific evidence) it is healthy, comfortable, well nourished, safe, able to express innate behaviour, and if it is not suffering from unpleasant states such as pain, fear, and distress. Good animal welfare requires disease prevention and veterinary treatment, appropriate shelter, management, nutrition, humane handling and humane slaughter/killing. Animal welfare refers to the state of the animal; the treatment that an animal receives is covered by other terms such as animal care, animal husbandry, and humane treatment."

Coping – Professor Donald Broom defines the welfare of an animal as "Its state as regards its attempts to cope with its environment. This state includes how much it is having to do to cope, the extent to which it is succeeding in or failing to cope, and its associated feelings." He states that "welfare will vary over a continuum from very good to very poor and studies of welfare will be most effective if a wide range of measures is used." John Webster criticized this definition for making "no attempt to say what constitutes good or bad welfare."

== Attitudes ==
Animal welfare often refers to a utilitarian attitude towards the well-being of nonhuman animals. It believes the animals can be exploited if the animal suffering and the costs of use is less than the benefits to humans. This attitude is also known simply as welfarism.

An example of welfarist thought is Hugh Fearnley-Whittingstall's meat manifesto. Point three of eight is:

Think about the animals that the meat you eat comes from. Are you at all concerned about how they have been treated? Have they lived well? Have they been fed on safe, appropriate foods? Have they been cared for by someone who respects them and enjoys contact with them? Would you like to be sure of that? Perhaps it's time to find out a bit more about where the meat you eat comes from. Or to buy from a source that reassures you about these points.

Robert Garner describes the welfarist position as the most widely held in modern society. He states that one of the best attempts to clarify this position is given by philosopher Robert Nozick:

Consider the following (too minimal) position about the treatment of animals. So that we can easily refer to it, let us label this position "utilitarianism for animals, Kantianism for people." It says: (1) maximize the total happiness of all living beings; (2) place stringent side constraints on what one may do to human beings. Human beings may not be used or sacrificed for the benefit of others; animals may be used or sacrificed for the benefit of other people or animals only if those benefits are greater than the loss inflicted.

Welfarism is often contrasted with the animal rights and animal liberation positions, which hold that animals should not be used by humans and should not be regarded as human property. However, it has been argued that both welfarism and animal liberation only make sense if it is assumed that animals have subjective welfare (if they care about what happens to them).

Increased affluence in many regions for the past few decades afforded consumers the disposable income to purchase products from high welfare systems. A 2006 survey concluded that a majority (63%) of EU citizens "show some willingness to change their usual place of shopping in order to be able to purchase more animal welfare-friendly products."

Gary L. Francione coined the term "new welfarism" in 1996 to describe a type of animal advocacy that views animal welfare as a short-term step toward animal rights. Thus, for instance, new welfarists want to phase out fur farms and animal experiments but in the short-term they try to improve conditions for the animals in these systems, so they lobby to make cages less constrictive and to reduce the numbers of animals used in laboratories.

== Criticisms ==
=== Denial of duties to animals ===
Some individuals in history have, at least in principle, rejected the view that humans have duties of any kind to animals.

Augustine of Hippo seemed to take such a position in his writings against those he saw as heretics: "For we see and hear by their cries that animals die with pain, although man disregards this in a beast, with which, as not having a rational soul, we have no community of rights."

=== Animal rights ===
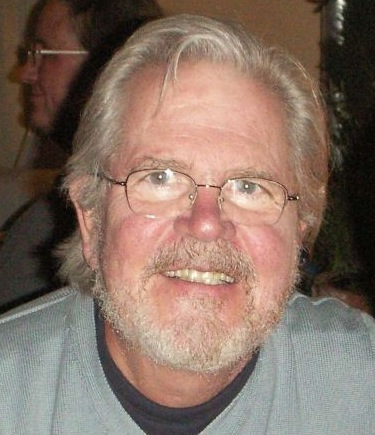
American philosopher Tom Regan has criticized the animal welfare movement for not going far enough to protect animals' interests.

Animal rights advocates, such as Gary L. Francione and Tom Regan, argue that the animal welfare position (advocating for the betterment of the condition of animals, but without abolishing animal use) is inconsistent in logic and ethically unacceptable. Philosopher Steven Best suggests that an emphasis on "welfarism" has the effect of legitimizing "any human use of animals" so long as humans aren't "cruel" to them and do whatever is necessary to avoid inflicting "unnecessary harm". Sociologist David Nibert writes that animal welfare reforms, usually implemented by wealthier countries, are often "modest" and "mostly localized", and are vastly surpassed by the ongoing expansion of the capitalist–driven animal–industrial complex, with the number of concentrated animal feeding operations and the animals to fill them dramatically increasing, along with growing numbers of humans consuming animal products. However, there are some animal right groups, such as PETA, which support animal welfare measures in the short term to alleviate animal suffering until all animal use is ended.

According to PETA's Ingrid Newkirk in an interview with Wikinews, there are two issues in animal welfare and animal rights. "If I only could have one thing, it would be to end suffering", said Newkirk. "If you could take things from animals and kill animals all day long without causing them suffering, then I would take it... Everybody should be able to agree that animals should not suffer if you kill them or steal from them by taking the fur off their backs or take their eggs, whatever. But you shouldn't put them through torture to do that."

Abolitionism holds that focusing on animal welfare not only fails to challenge animal suffering, but may actually prolong it by making the exercise of property rights over animals appear less unattractive. The abolitionists' objective is to secure a moral and legal paradigm shift, whereby animals are no longer regarded as property. In recent years documentaries such as watchdominion.com have been produced, exposing the suffering occurring in animal agriculture facilities that are marketed as having high welfare standards.

== Animal welfare organizations ==
=== Global ===
World Animal Protection was founded in 1981 to protect animals around the globe.

World Organisation for Animal Health (OIE): The intergovernmental organisation responsible for improving animal health worldwide. The OIE has been established "for the purpose of projects of international public utility relating to the control of animal diseases, including those affecting humans and the promotion of animal welfare and animal production food safety."

World Animal Protection: Protects animals across the globe. World Animal Protection's objectives include helping people understand the critical importance of good animal welfare, encouraging nations to commit to animal-friendly practices, and building the scientific case for the better treatment of animals. They are global in a sense that they have consultative status at the Council of Europe and collaborate with national governments, the United Nations, the Food and Agriculture Organization and the World Organization for Animal Health.

=== Non-government organizations ===
Animal Welfare Institute (AWI): An American non-profit charitable organization founded by Christine Stevens in 1951 with the goal of reducing suffering inflicted on animals by humans. It is one of the oldest animal welfare organizations in the US.

Canadian Council on Animal Care: The national organization responsible for overseeing the care and use of animals involved in Canadian Science.

Canadian Federation of Humane Societies (CFHS): The only national organization representing humane societies and SPCAs in Canada. They provide leadership on animal welfare issues and spread the message across Canada.

The Canadian Veterinary Medical Association: Brings in veterinary involvement to animal welfare. Their objective is to share this concern of animals with all members of the profession, with the general public, with government at all levels, and with other organizations such as the CFHS, which have similar concerns.

Compassion in World Farming: Founded over 40 years ago in 1967 by a British farmer who became horrified by the development of modern, intensive factory farming. "Today we campaign peacefully to end all cruel factory farming practices. We believe that the biggest cause of cruelty on the planet deserves a focused, specialised approach – so we only work on farm animal welfare."

FarmKind: Raises funds for animal welfare organizations working to reform or end factory farming (specifically, The Humane League, The Good Food Institute, Sinergia Animal, Dansk Vegetarisk Forening, Fish Welfare Initiative and Shrimp Welfare Project - all of which have been recommended by Animal Charity Evaluators. They function as a donation guide for those seeking to help animals as much as possible with their donations.

The Movement for Compassionate Living: Exists to promote "simple vegan living and self-reliance as a remedy against the exploitation of humans, animals and the Earth", "the use of trees and vegan-organic farming to meet the needs of society for food and natural resources", and "a land-based society where as much of our food and resources as possible are produced locally".

National Animal Interest Alliance: An animal welfare organization in the United States founded in 1991 promotes the welfare of animals, strengthens the human-animal bond, and safeguards the rights of responsible animal owners, enthusiasts and professionals through research, public information and sound public policy. They host an online library of information about various animal-related subjects serving as a resource for groups and individuals dedicated to responsible animal care and well-being.

National Farm Animal Care Council: Their objectives are to facilitate collaboration among members with respect to farm animal care issues in Canada, to facilitate information sharing and communication, and to monitor trends and initiatives in both the domestic and international market place.

National Office of Animal Health: A British organisation that represents its members drawn from the animal medicines industry.

Ontario Society for the Prevention of Cruelty to Animals: A registered charity comprising over 50 communities.

Royal Society for the Prevention of Cruelty to Animals: A well-known animal welfare charity in England and Wales, founded in 1824.

Universities Federation for Animal Welfare: A UK registered charity, established in 1926, that works to develop and promote improvements in the welfare of all animals through scientific and educational activity worldwide.

== Links to animal welfare and rights by country ==
- Animal welfare and rights in Brazil
- Animal welfare and rights in China
- Animal rights in Colombia
- Animal welfare in Egypt
- Animal welfare and rights in Germany
- Animal welfare and rights in India
- Animal welfare and rights in Israel
- Animal welfare and rights in Japan
- Animal welfare and rights in Malaysia
- Animal welfare in Nazi Germany
- Animal welfare in New Zealand
- Animal welfare and rights in South Korea
- Animal welfare in Thailand
- Animal welfare in the United Kingdom
- Animal welfare in the United States

== See also ==
- Animal consciousness
- Animal law
- Animal welfare science
- Cambridge Declaration on Consciousness
- Cultured meat
- Eurogroup for Animals
- Francis of Assisi, associated with patronage of animals
- Human–animal bonding
- Intrinsic value (animal ethics)
- List of abnormal behaviours in animals
- List of animal rights advocates
- List of animal welfare groups
- List of animal welfare parties
- Pain in animals
- Pain in invertebrates
- Wild animal suffering
- Women and animal advocacy
- World Animal Day
