= Up or down vote =

Type of direct vote in the US house of representatives

An up or down vote refers to a direct vote in the US House of Representatives or the US Senate (or indeed in a state senate) on an amendment bill. It is sometimes referred to as a "clean vote." Members vote yea or nay on the matter rather than voting on a related procedural maneuver. Depending upon the rules of order for that particular type of amendment or bill, the vote required for passage might be a 2/3 majority, a 3/5 majority, or a simple majority.

The phrase is probably most often used by those who are frustrated by opponents in the House or Senate who delay a bill indefinitely by means of various tactics. The rules of the House and Senate allow a bill to be delayed, even permanently, by various means, such as by tabling the bill, recommitting it, or amending it in the second degree. By appealing for an "up or down vote," an advocate of the bill tries to get it out of committee and past all other legislative hurdles and to a floor vote.

In 2005, the phrase was heard most often from Republicans in the United States, who occupied 55 seats in the United States Senate and so lacked the 60 votes required to overcome a filibuster maneuver by the Democratic senators. A united Democratic bloc was able to filibuster any objectionable bill, presidential appointment, or other matter before the Senate and to prevent its passage. If the Republicans were able to bring any particular matter to an "up or down vote," they would be able to approve that measure if they were united.

Many Republican-affiliated websites and political action committees had urged voters to demand of their senators and representatives an "up or down vote" on various issues. Constitutionally, however, the Senate is not obliged to give any matter an up or down vote.

Since taking control of the Senate in 2006, Democrats have accused Republicans of filibustering almost every proposal so requiring 60 votes to pass any legislation (the American Recovery and Reinvestment Act, the Patient Protection and Affordable Care Act, and the Dodd-Frank Wall Street Reform and Consumer Protection Act). (Republicans set a record for the most number of filibusters during the 111th congress.) The need for employing the filibuster was removed from 2014–2020 when the Republicans controlled the Senate at the end of the Obama administration and during President Trump's time in office.

== See also ==
- Nuclear option
