= Hypertype =

Extreme attributes due to animal breeding

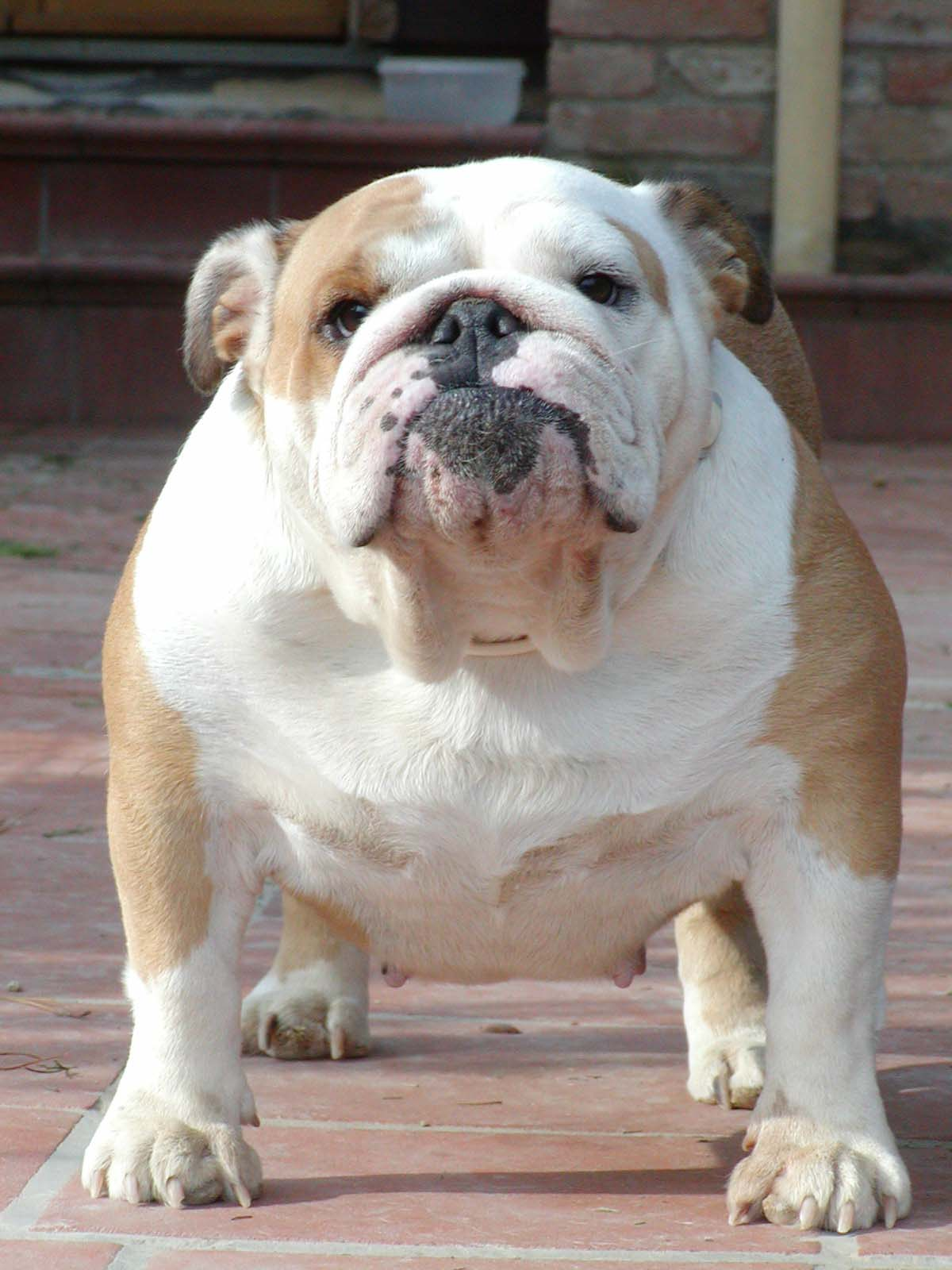
An English bulldog, a dog breed often cited as an example of canine hypertype.

In the field of animal breeding and anatomy, a hypertype is the extreme accentuation of distinctive traits specific to a domesticated animal breed. This is particularly true of dogs, cattle and pigs, and more rarely of cats, horses, rabbits and other species. In companion animals, hypertype is favored by breeders and breed associations in direct connection with beauty and show competitions. Hypertype poses a problem when it leads to the selection of animals on aesthetic criteria that cause them suffering.

The harmful consequences of hypertype particularly affect brachycephalic dogs suffering from respiratory problems, and therefore also dogs with a neotenic appearance such as the Cavalier King Charles Spaniel, with its reduced skull volume. Utility dogs are less affected. The German Shepherd is a well-known case in point, whose locomotor disorders are increased by the lowering of the topline, making it more susceptible to the effects of hip dysplasia. Hypertypes also affect Persian cats, Arabian show horses, Culard cattle and dairy cows. Many veterinarians and researchers have spoken out against hypertyping, believing that it produces "monsters", compromises animal welfare, and puts the breeds concerned at risk of extinction in the long term.

== Definition ==
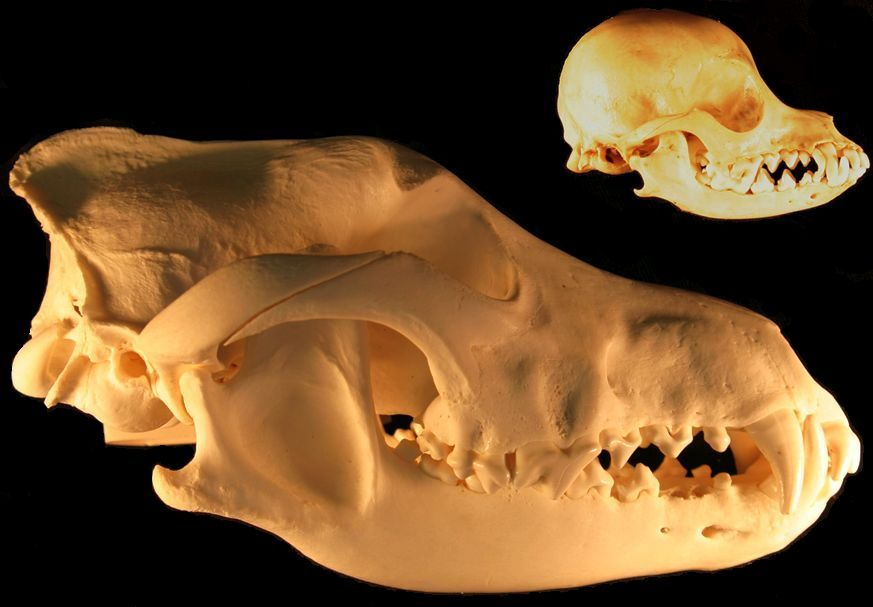
Comparison of a gray wolf skull with that of a Chihuahua dog (top and right).

In zootechnics, "type" refers to the morphological attributes characteristic of a given animal population or breed. It is generally linked to a particular use or vocation, while the "model" expresses a particular expression of this type.

The hypertype can be considered as a particular model within a type. It is the result of a selection process that results in a strong, even excessive, accentuation of certain characteristics of the type, with a view to a particular zootechnical use, whether utilitarian (livestock) or aesthetic (companion animals). In livestock, the "culard" hypertype is found in particular in the Belgian Blue beef breed, and the dairy morphological hypertype in certain strains of Holstein cattle.

In pets, hypertype is associated with the quest for "conventional beauty". It translates into the exaggeration of beauty criteria, with fashion effects.

In terms of genetic determinism, morphological hypertypes are governed by major genes (genes that play an important role in varying the expression of a quantitative trait), and have a high heritability, making it easy for selection to fix such traits. Inbreeding can contribute to this by increasing the homozygosity of major genes, but it is wrong to consider that consanguinity per se generates hypertypes.

The excessive accentuation of morphological or anatomical traits in hypertypes, and the physiological changes correlated with them, generally confer a very diminished adaptive value. Hypertype animals can therefore only be maintained in highly controlled breeding environments and with highly adapted breeding methods. For example, breeder intervention may be indispensable for reproduction when this cannot be achieved under natural conditions (insemination and delivery by caesarean section).

Because of this, the production of hypertypes is generally considered contrary to animal welfare. From a zootechnical point of view, when environmental conditions are perfectly adapted to the anatomical and physiological requirements of the hypertype, its viability can be considered normal.

== History in dog and cat breeding ==
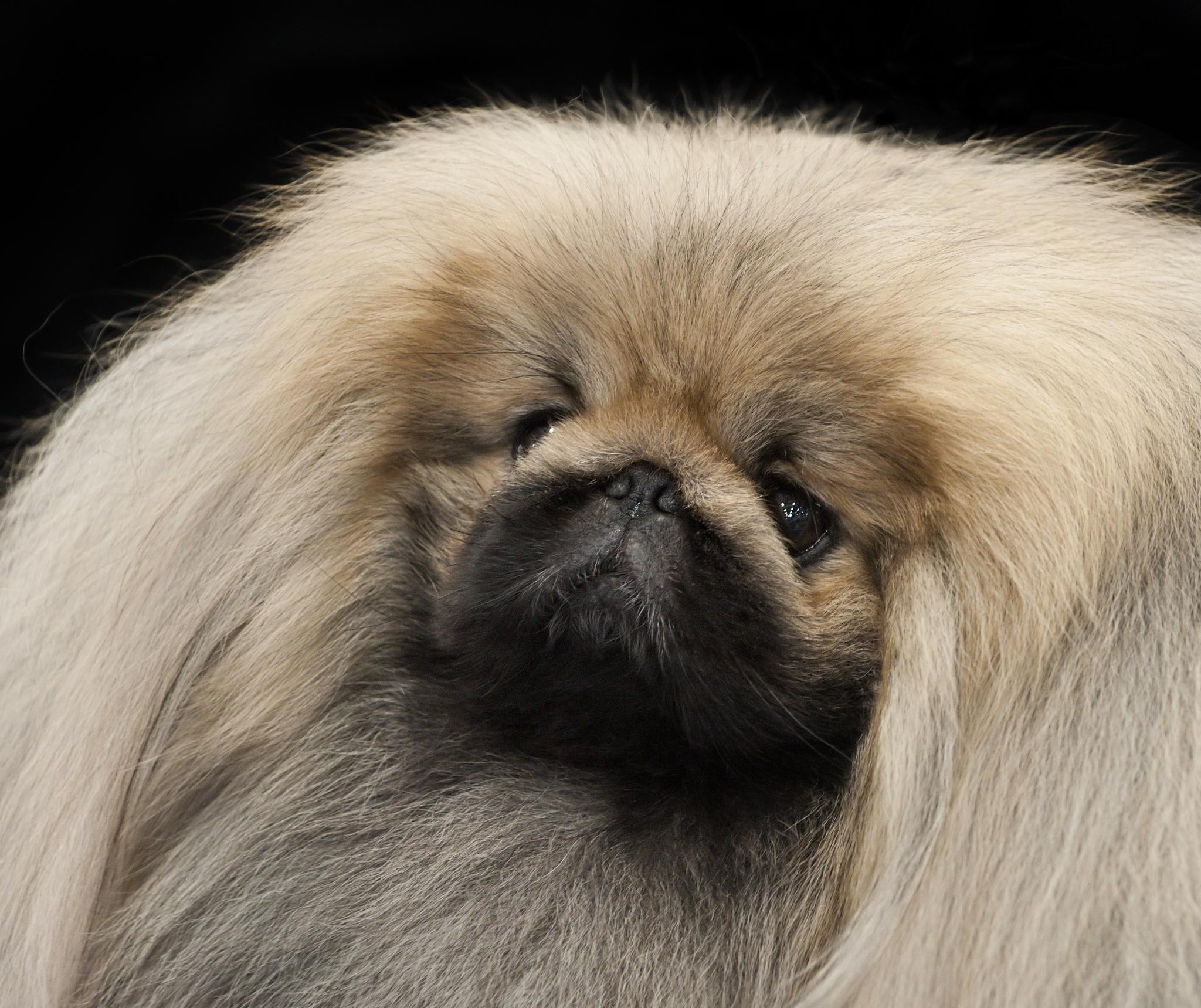
The case of the sick Pekingese dog that won Crufts in 2003 helped launch the hypertype debate.

Hypertype is a recent concept in dog and cat breeding.

=== Origin ===
Dogs have always been selected for their ability to perform practical tasks (guarding, hunting...). In the 19th century, aesthetics gradually became the criterion for selecting dog breeds. The quest for homogeneity led to a decline in genetic diversity. Queen Victoria, in particular with her Pekingese, promoted canine aesthetics and dog breeding as a pastime and social marker. Breeders selected animals on the basis of size and abnormalities, such as shorter legs. The rapid success of dog shows led to transformations in purebred dogs. The United States and England are at the origin of most hypertyped dog breeds. Breeding for this purpose was encouraged by the market, as hypertyped and miniaturized dogs were easier to sell. The "cult of the hypertype" is particularly prevalent in dog breeding at the beginning of the 21st century, with an article in Le Figaro magazine citing the existence of this problem as early as 1996. The damaging effects of hypertype are nowhere more apparent than in the case of the winner of the 2003 Crufts, a major English dog show. This Pekingese underwent palate-veil surgery and, suffering from hyperthermia, received his prize by being placed on ice cubes.

The case for horses is similar. The Arabian thoroughbred, bred for utility until the middle of the 20th century, is now increasingly bred for beauty. In just 50 or 60 years, the profile of his head has deepened considerably.

=== Control by canine and feline organizations ===
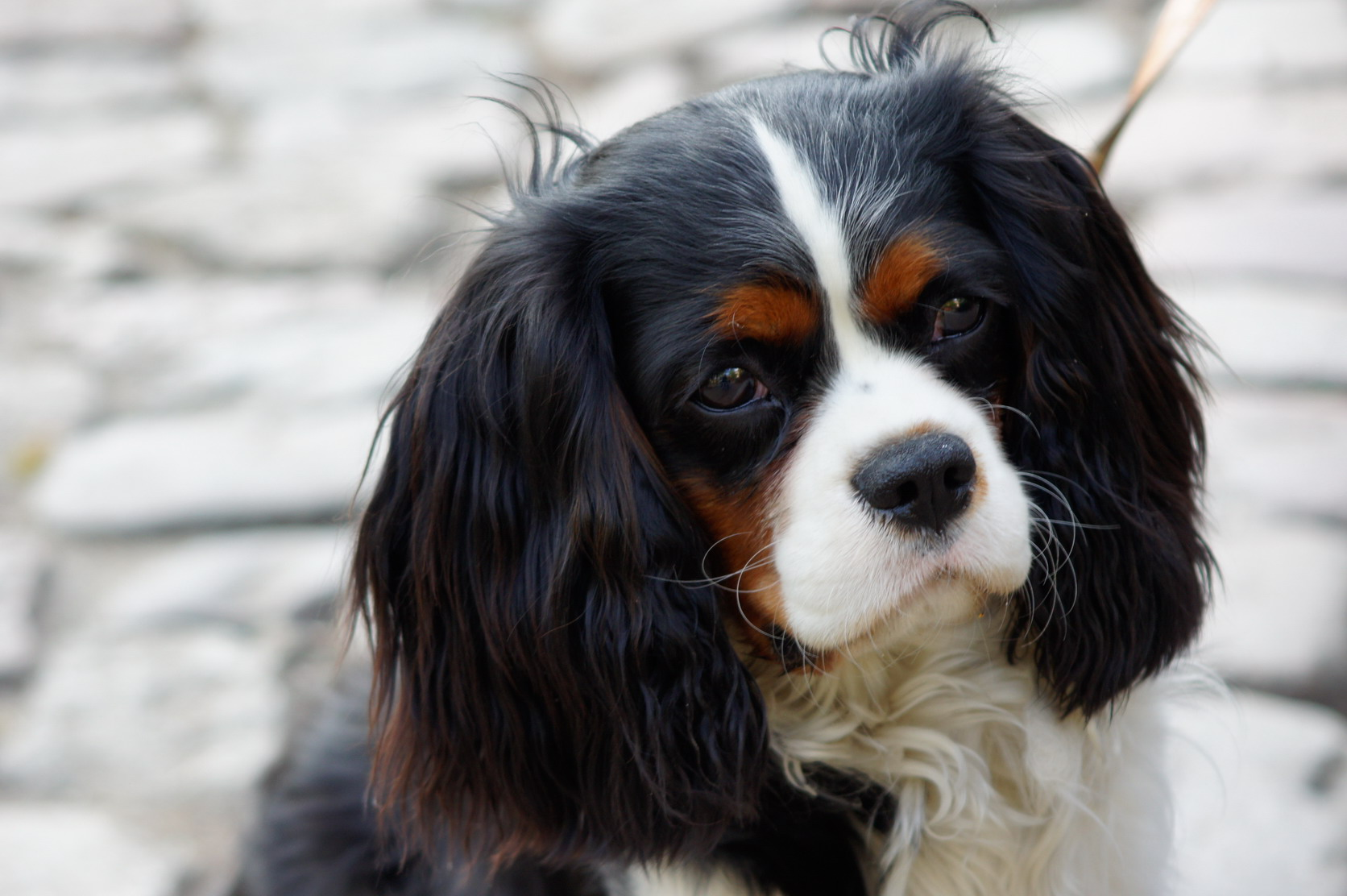
A Cavalier King Charles Spaniel, one of the hypertyped breeds featured in the documentary Pedigree Dogs Exposed.

Awareness of these problems is recent, but the reactions of some of the breeding societies concerned (including the Société Centrale Canine) were immediate. In 2004, the LOOF sounded the alarm on the hypertypes affecting several cat breeds, and a few years later amended its rules to disqualify Persian cats with pinched nostrils. In 2009, a vast study was carried out on the 50 most popular dog breeds in the UK, establishing that of the 396 heritable disorders detected, 84 were directly linked to hypertypes required or favored by the breed standards.

The Swedish Kennel Club has placed 70 dog breeds under surveillance and banned inbreeding. The Kennel Club in England has reviewed the standards of around 100 breeds. The Fédération Cynologique Internationale does not consider hypertypes to be a problem, since they are what distinguish dog breeds from one another. However, it has issued instructions to its judges to facilitate the sanctioning of hypertypes that cause health problems during competitions. Dog show judges are not always able to determine whether the dog presented to them is in good physical condition, despite training efforts in this area. In 2013, however, eugenic considerations in dog selection tended more and more towards the elimination of disease at the expense of aesthetics. Breed standards can now be changed if there is evidence of suffering caused by a hypertype, as in the case of the English Bulldog and Basset Hound. The president of the Société Centrale Canine believes that the revision of competition scoring criteria will enable hypertypes to disappear rapidly, as breeders will no longer be interested in producing this type of dog.

== Animal breeds affected by hypertypes ==
Not all animal breeds are predisposed to or suffer from hypertypes. Likewise, the associated pathologies vary with the hypertype in question. In dogs, short muzzles and concave heads in particular are known to cause breathing difficulties.

=== Dog breeds ===
In dogs, hypertype is more common among "fashionable" breeds. The muzzle of brachycephalic breeds (particularly Pekingese, Bulldogs and Pugs) has become shorter in recent decades. The English Bulldog standard has long called for the muzzle to be "as short as possible", leading to respiratory problems as the slender, soft palate reduces air flow. This breed is plagued by many other problems, with reduced ability to explore the environment and to mate, and frequent recourse to artificial insemination and Caesarean section. Carlins and Pekingese suffer from their prominent eyes, which predispose them to ulcers and eye dislocations.

Dog breeds have been pushed towards dwarfism or gigantism, to the detriment of "average" size. Giant breeds with heavy bones are predisposed to bone pathologies such as osteochondritis, hip dysplasia and elbow dysplasia. In Newfoundland, hip dysplasia has become increasingly common, with the search for certain characteristics of dwarfism. The chow-chow suffers from locomotor difficulties due to the need for straight hind limbs. Dachshunds and Basset Hounds have very long backs and very short legs, leading not only to back pain, but also to difficulties in expressing behavior, as these breeds are unable to adopt the "bowing" posture for play calling, which is important in dog behavior. The German Shepherd's back has become increasingly plunging, with an increasing number of cases of hip dysplasia. The Shar Pei is sought after with as many folds as possible, leading to skin infections such as dermatitis. Companion and show dogs are particularly prone to health problems resulting from hypertypes, as aesthetic criteria are paramount in their selection, unlike utility dogs.

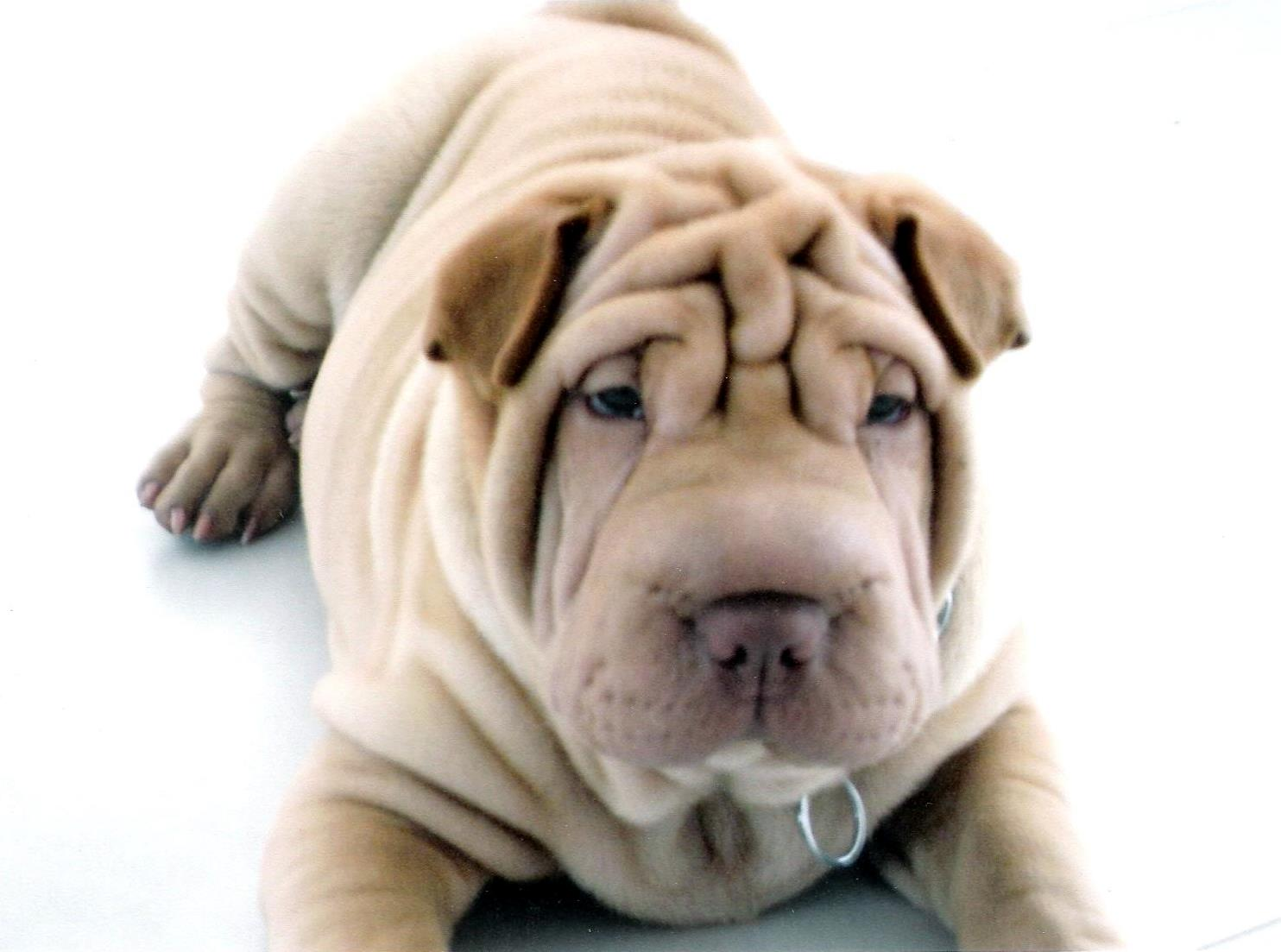
Shar Pei (folded skin)

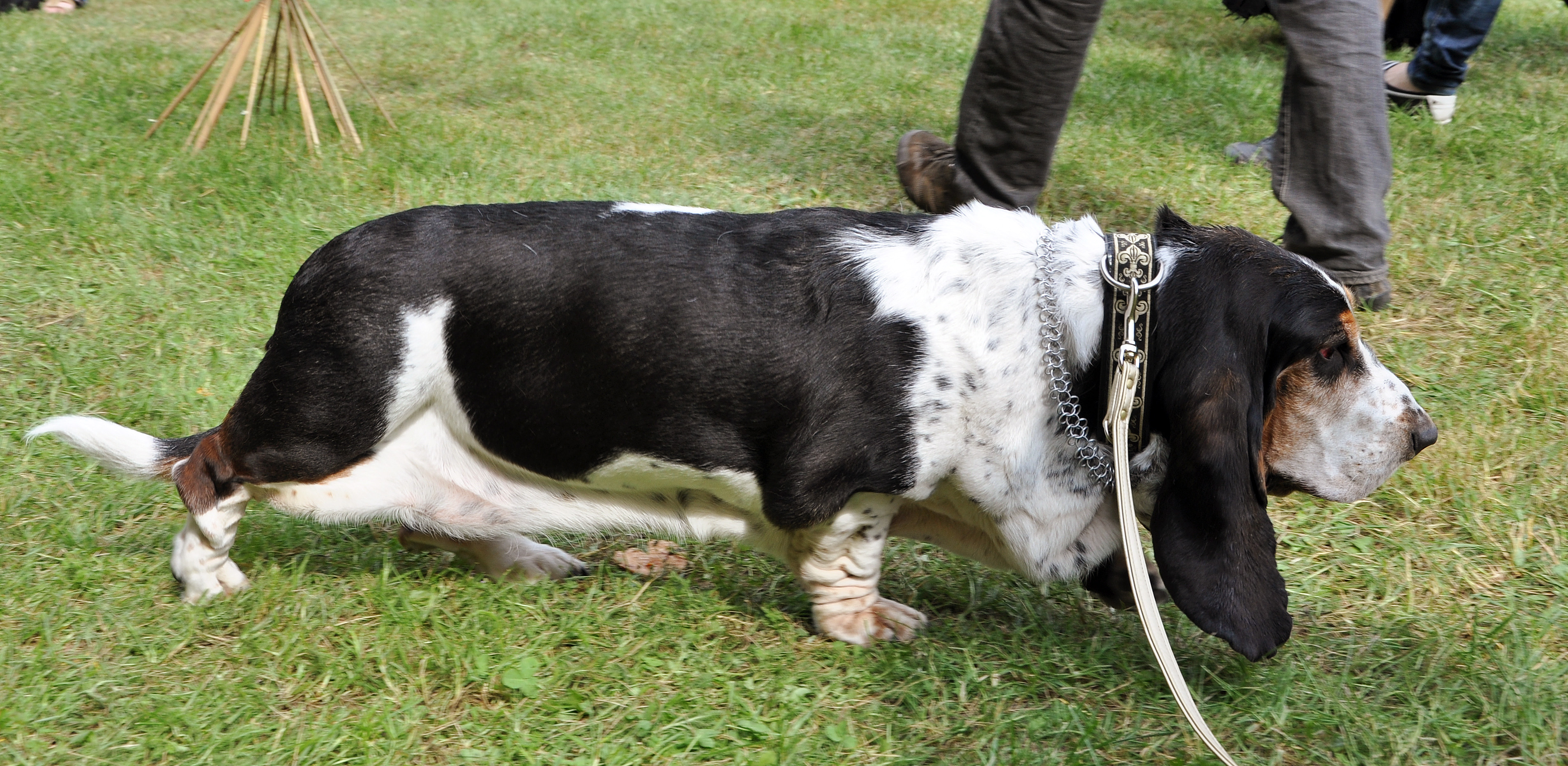
Basset Hound (short legs, long back, loose skin and long ears).

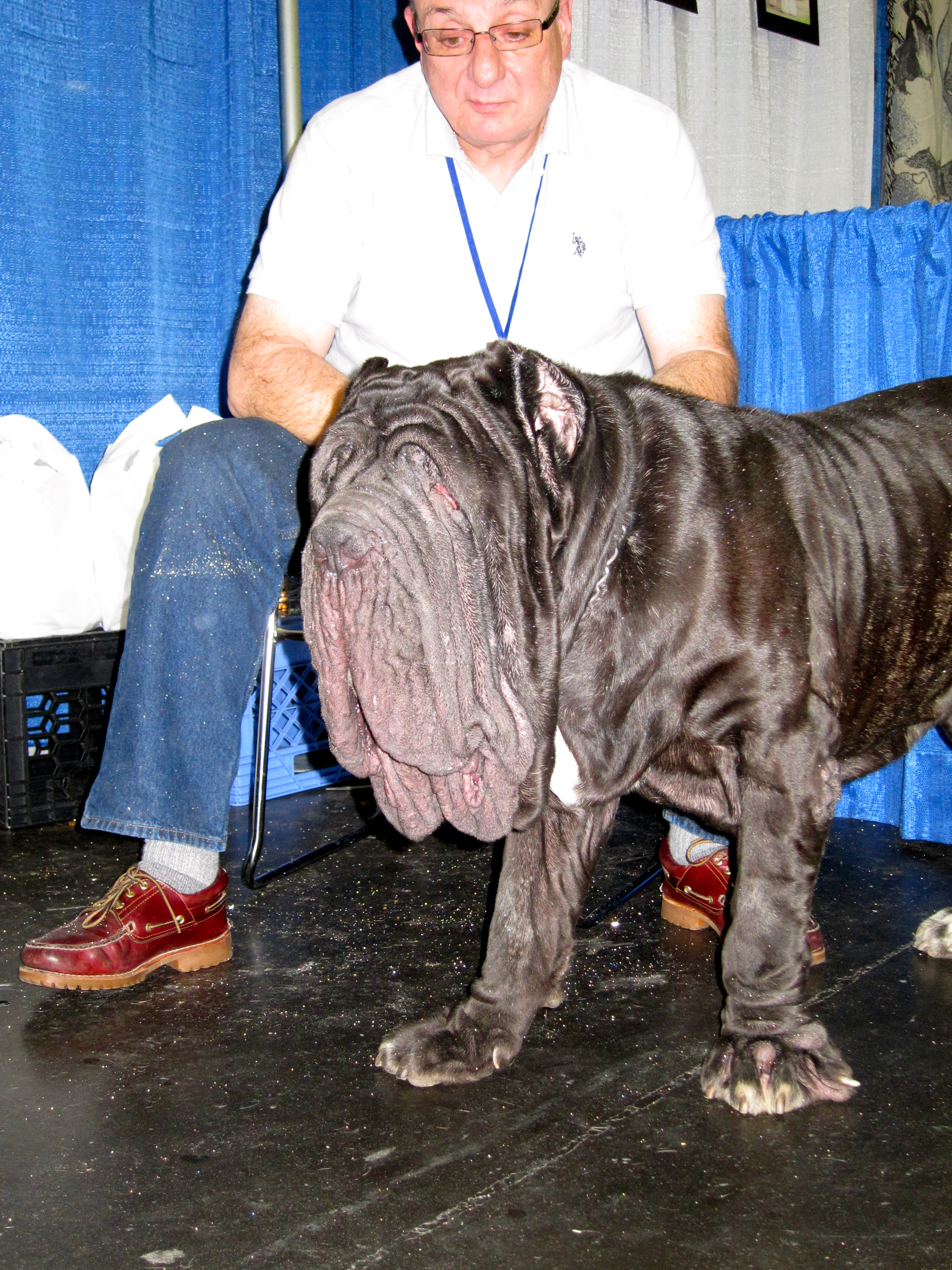
Neapolitan Mastiff (size, loose, wrinkled skin on the head).

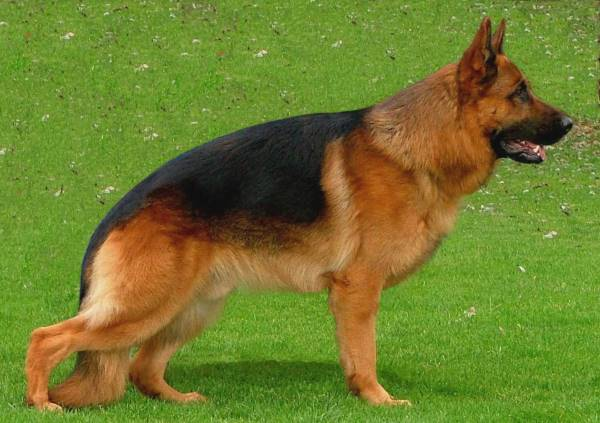
German Shepherd (line of the back).

The search for large eyes and a "puppy head" in the Cavalier King Charles has multiplied the number of cases of syringomyelia, due to the reduced volume of the cranium. Similarly, in dogs with large heads or fragile dwarf breeds such as the Chihuahua, some births are carried out by Caesarean section. The pursuit of a corkscrew tail in breeds such as the Pug predisposes to scoliosis. The Rhodesian dog's dorsal crest seems to predispose it to dermoid sinus, which affects between 5 and 10% of the breed's subjects, and to spinal malformations. The dog's hypertype can take a variety of forms, such as a very abundant coat in the Bearded Collie, or very long, hanging or folded ears. The Cocker Spaniel frequently suffers from ear infections.

In 2018, the French Veterinary Academy issued an opinion on canine hypertypes, calling them programmed mistreatment. In it, it issued recommendations for industry players, asking dog show judges not to reward hypertyped individuals, breeding players not to choose the most hypertyped individuals for reproduction, and urging the cessation of advertising featuring hypertyped dogs. Since 2019 in the Netherlands, it has been forbidden to breed crushed-face dogs whose muzzle is less than half the size of their skull. However, these dogs are bred illegally. In 2022, a Norwegian court ruled that breeding Cavalier King Charles and English Bulldogs caused suffering incompatible with animal protection laws. In 2023, a proposal was made in the Netherlands by the Minister of Agriculture to ban canine and feline hypertypes that cause permanent suffering.

Campaigns are run in various countries to dissuade buyers from acquiring dogs with crushed faces.

=== Cat breeds ===
Although hypertype is less well known in cats than in dogs, it has become widespread, particularly in American brachycephalic breeds such as the Persian, Exotic Shorthair and Burmese, accompanied by breathing difficulties and dental malocclusion. The Persian's exaggeratedly squashed muzzle leads to obstruction of the tear duct, and is associated with a large, round head that strongly favors dystocia (same mechanism as in brachycephalic dogs). The gene responsible for folded ears in the Scottish Fold causes malformations in homozygotes. The Maine Coon, a brevilinear breed, is affected by arthrosis and various joint problems due to its mass.

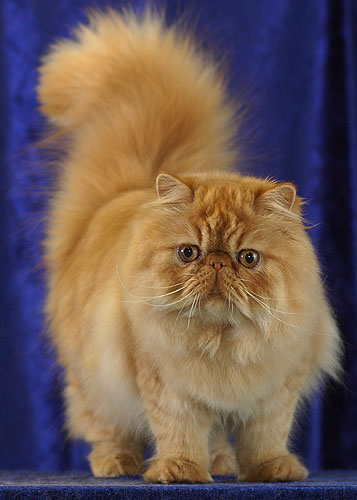
Persian cat

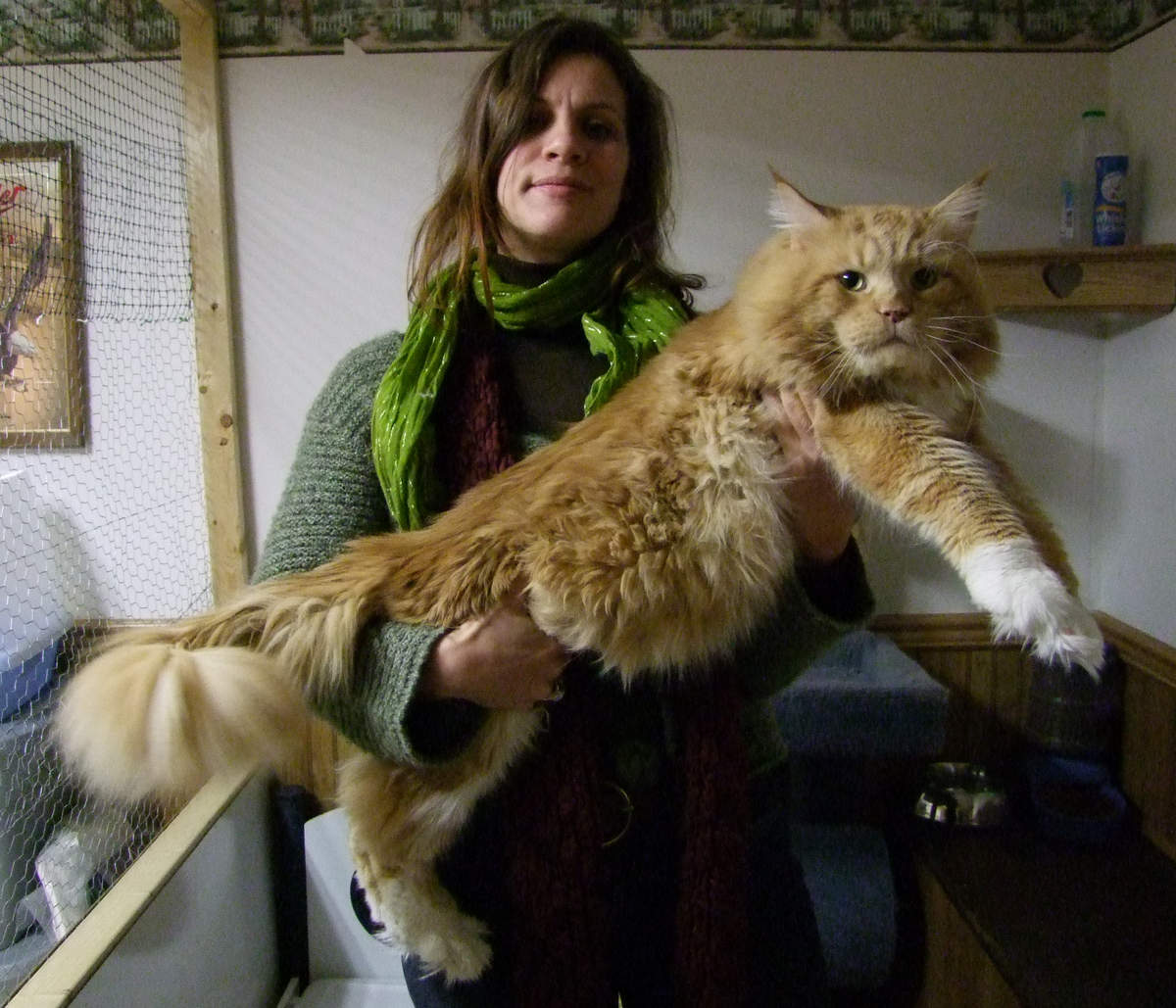
Maine Coon

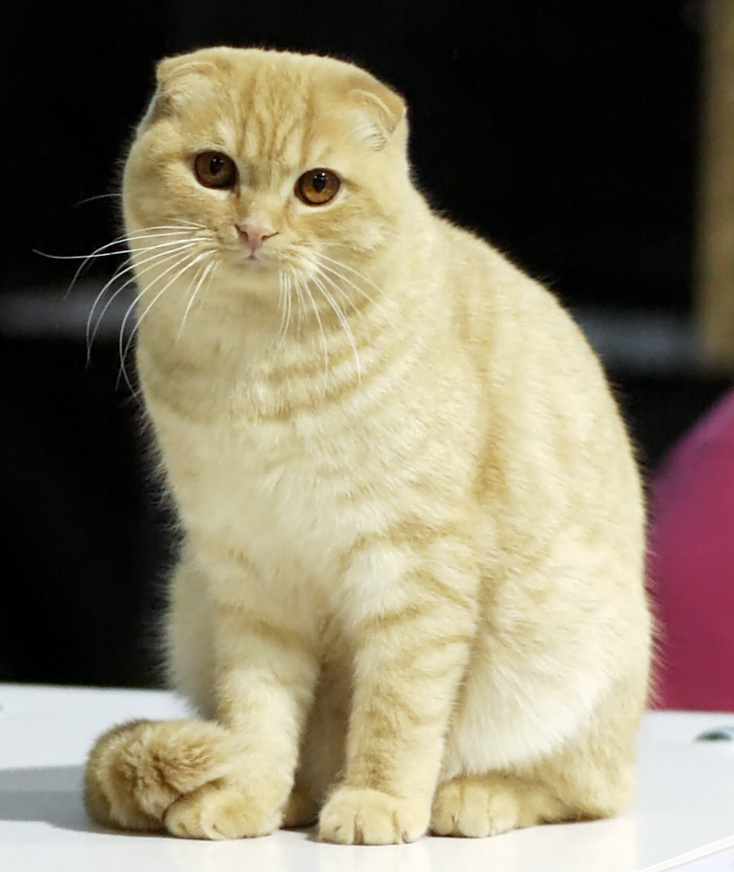
Scottish Fold

=== Rabbit breeds ===
The hypertype is less well known and less frequent in domestic rabbits, but is nevertheless present in certain breeds, selected for their floppy ears and brachycephalic skull, such as the Dutch rabbit and the lionhead rabbit.

=== Horse breeds ===
The occurrence of hypertypes in horses is quite rare, as the mounted use of the animal prevents extreme morphological drift. They mainly concern giant (draught) or miniature breeds, and the purebred show Arabian, sought after with an exaggeratedly concave muzzle, which can lead to breathing difficulties. The existence of hypertypes in horses was publicized in 2017 with the case of El Rey Magnum.

The selection criteria for halter Quarter Horses and Paint Horses, which are as muscular as possible on thin limbs, cause the horse to suffer in the feet, in addition to encouraging the proliferation of a genetic muscle disease. In addition, these horses are often supplemented with steroids and confined to small spaces to maintain their excessive musculature. They serve no other purpose than to be "living fashion prints", and prove unfit for real riding work. The quest for more abundant hair in the Gypsy horse and the Friesian, also affected by the emphasis placed on its trot to the detriment of its morphology, is also a hypertype.

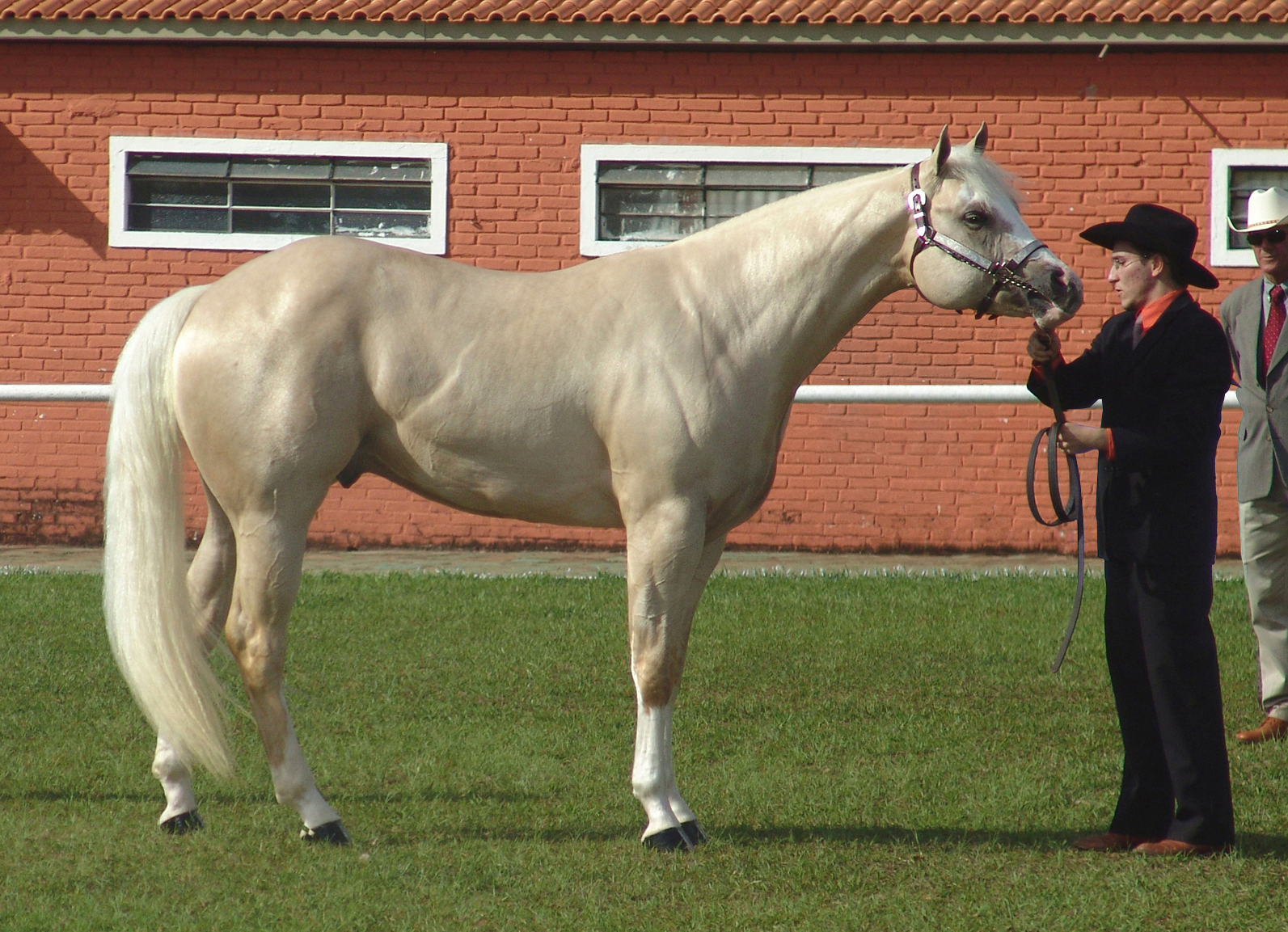
Heavy musculature on a halter horse

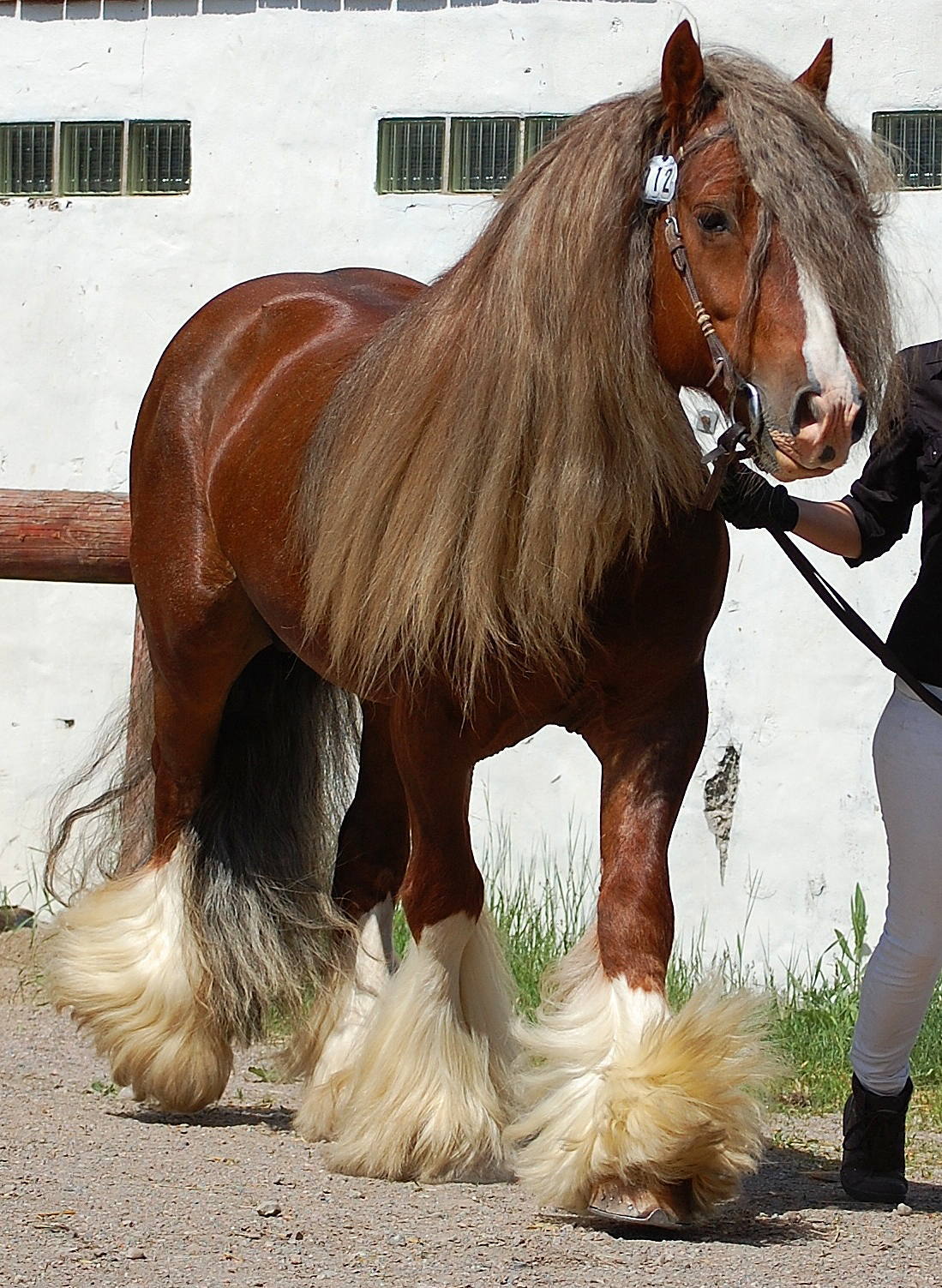
Abundant mane and feathering on a Gypsy horse

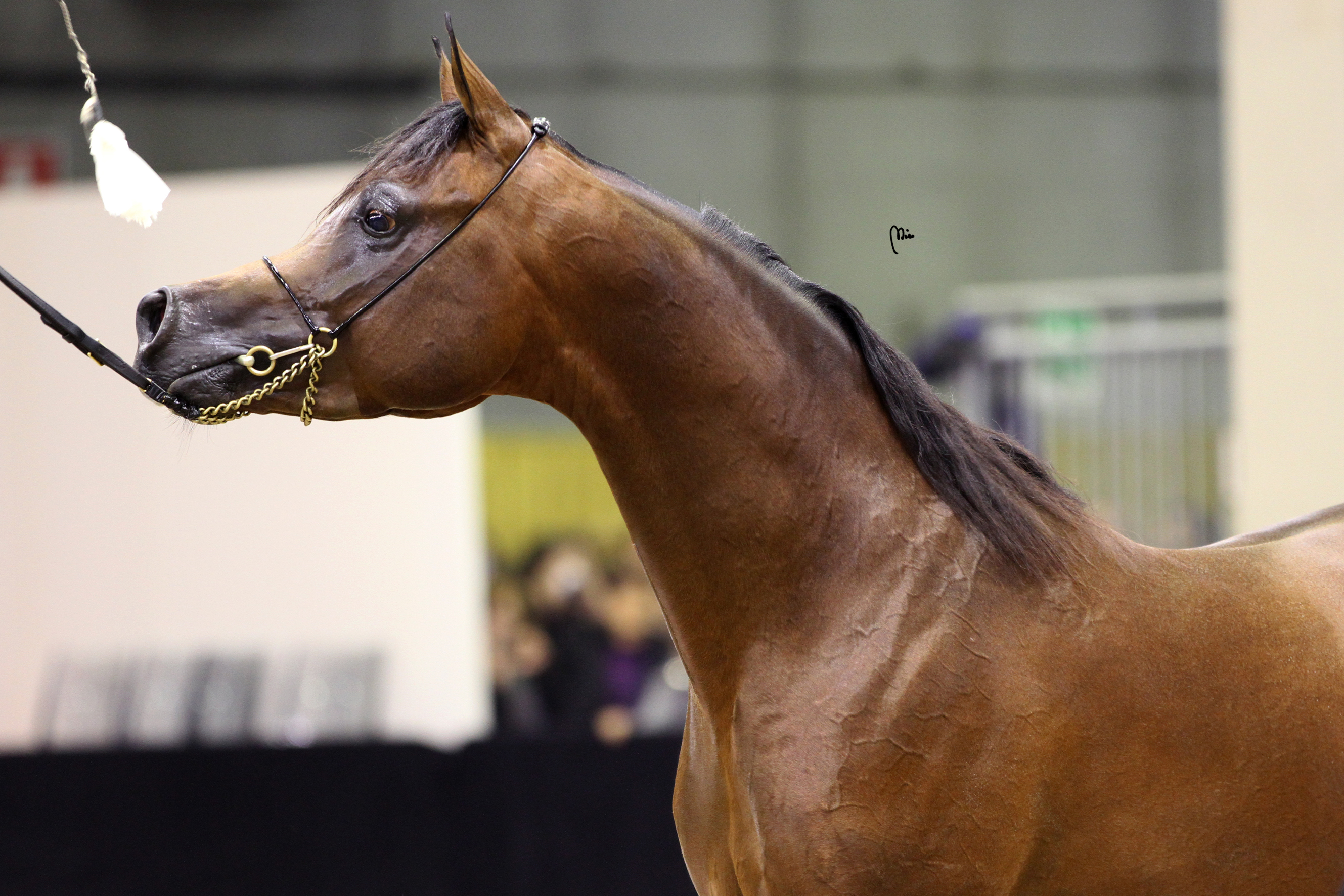
Extreme concave profile on a show Arabian horse

=== Livestock ===
The morphology of certain cattle and pig breeds specialized for meat production means that they are generally considered to be muscular hypertypes. This is the case with Charolais cows, which are so specialized in producing calves that are heavy at birth, that the incidence of dystocia, and therefore of Caesarean deliveries, is higher than in breeds without this hypertype. With the evolution of the Limousin breed, caesarean calvings are becoming increasingly frequent, reaching 5% of births in 2017. In some extreme cases, breeds are selected for the presence of the culard gene (a hypermuscularity gene also present in Piétrain and Belgian Landrace pigs), with the incidence of caesarean deliveries reaching 69%, particularly in Belgian Blue cows. The presence of the culard gene is also accompanied by skeletal deficiencies in relation to the animal's musculature, leading to musculoskeletal pain and difficulty walking.

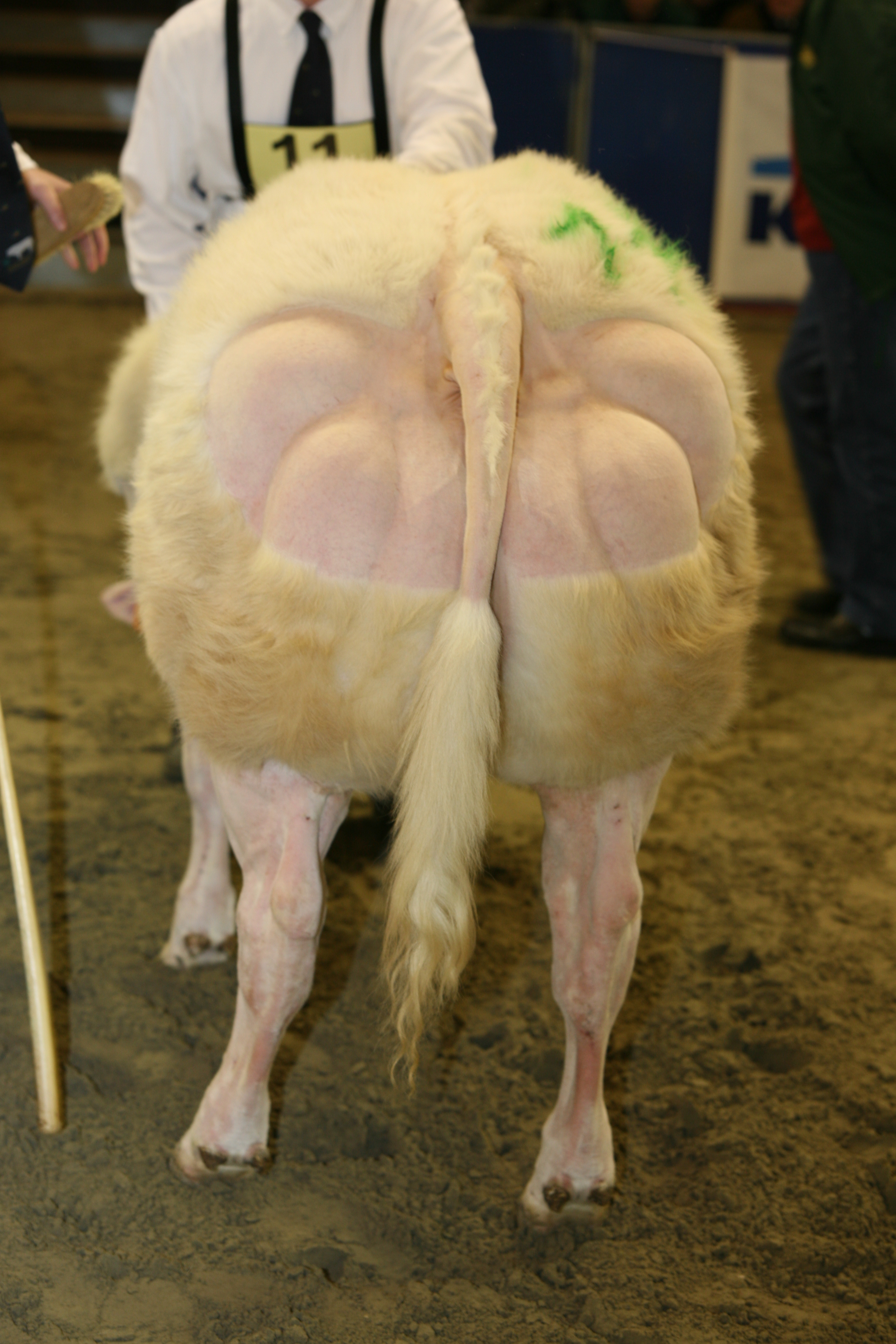
Rear end of a Belgian blue cattle.

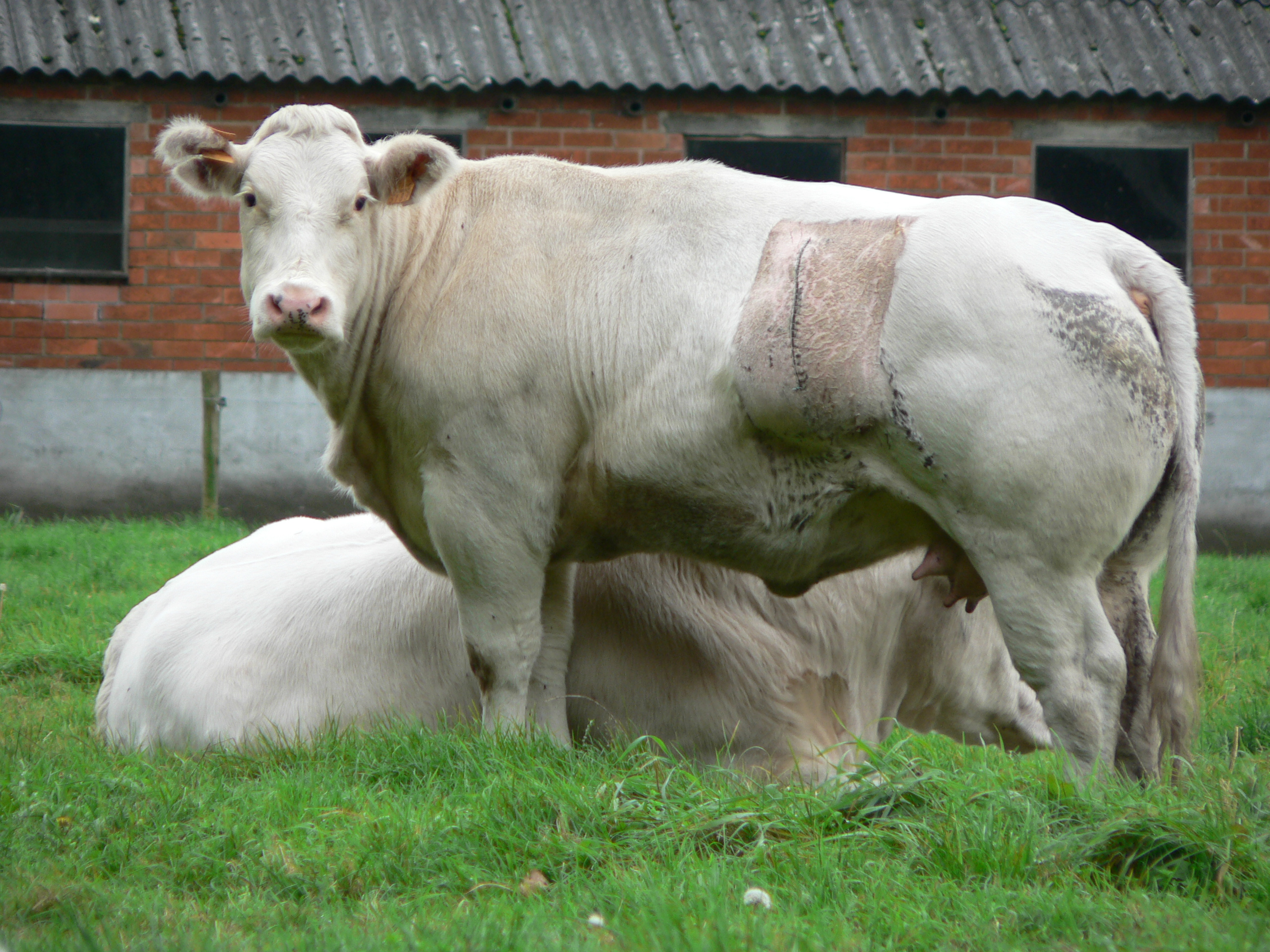
Caesarean scar from a Belgian Blue cow.

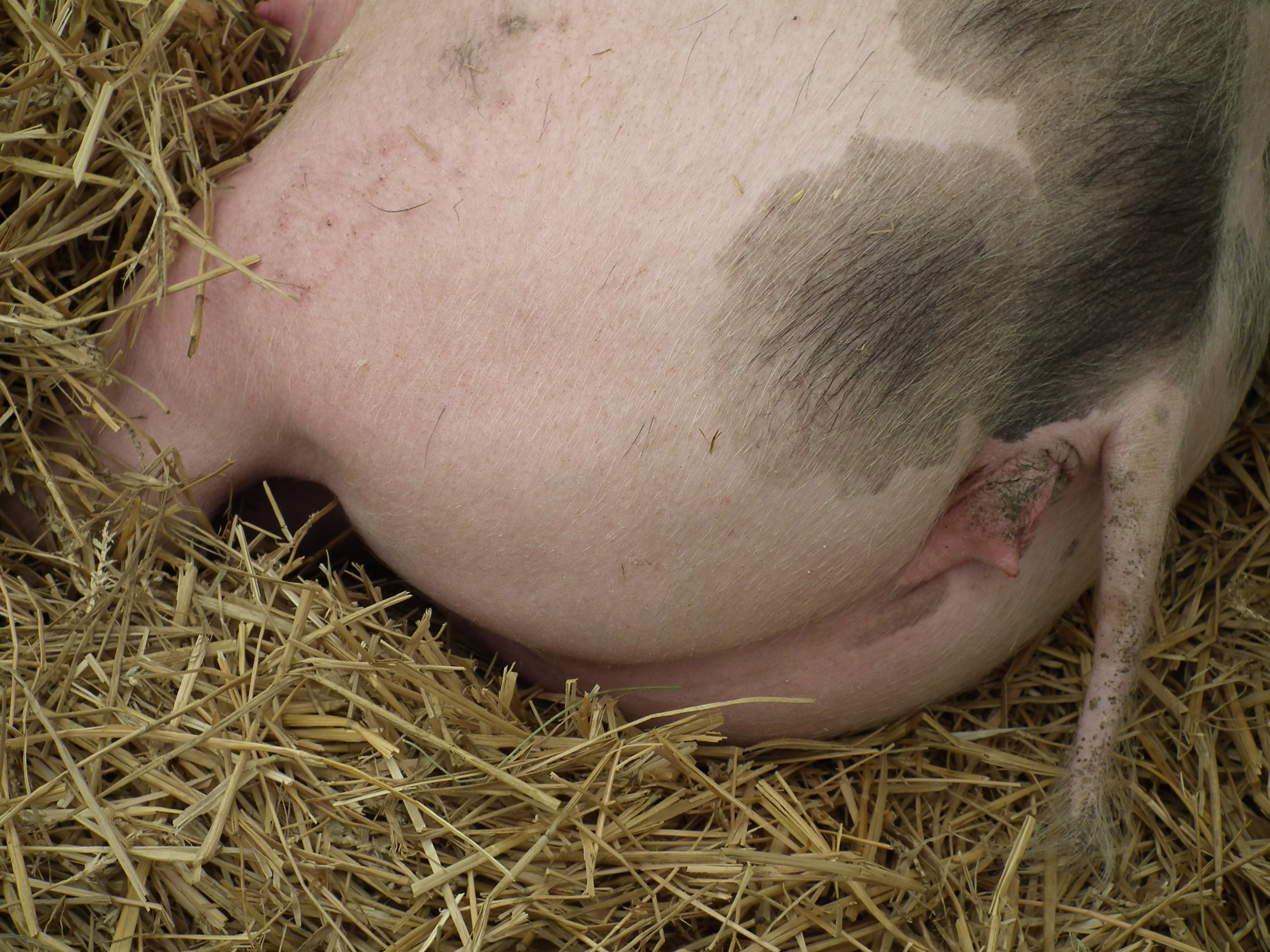
Rear end of a Piétrain pig.

The same applies to dairy breeds selected excessively for milk production, which are considered to be dairy hypertypes. This is the case for Prim'Holsteins, the majority breed in dairy farming. Some dairy cows are capable of producing over 10,000 kg of milk per lactation, but this productivity is at the expense of their health (mastitis), longevity and reproductive function.

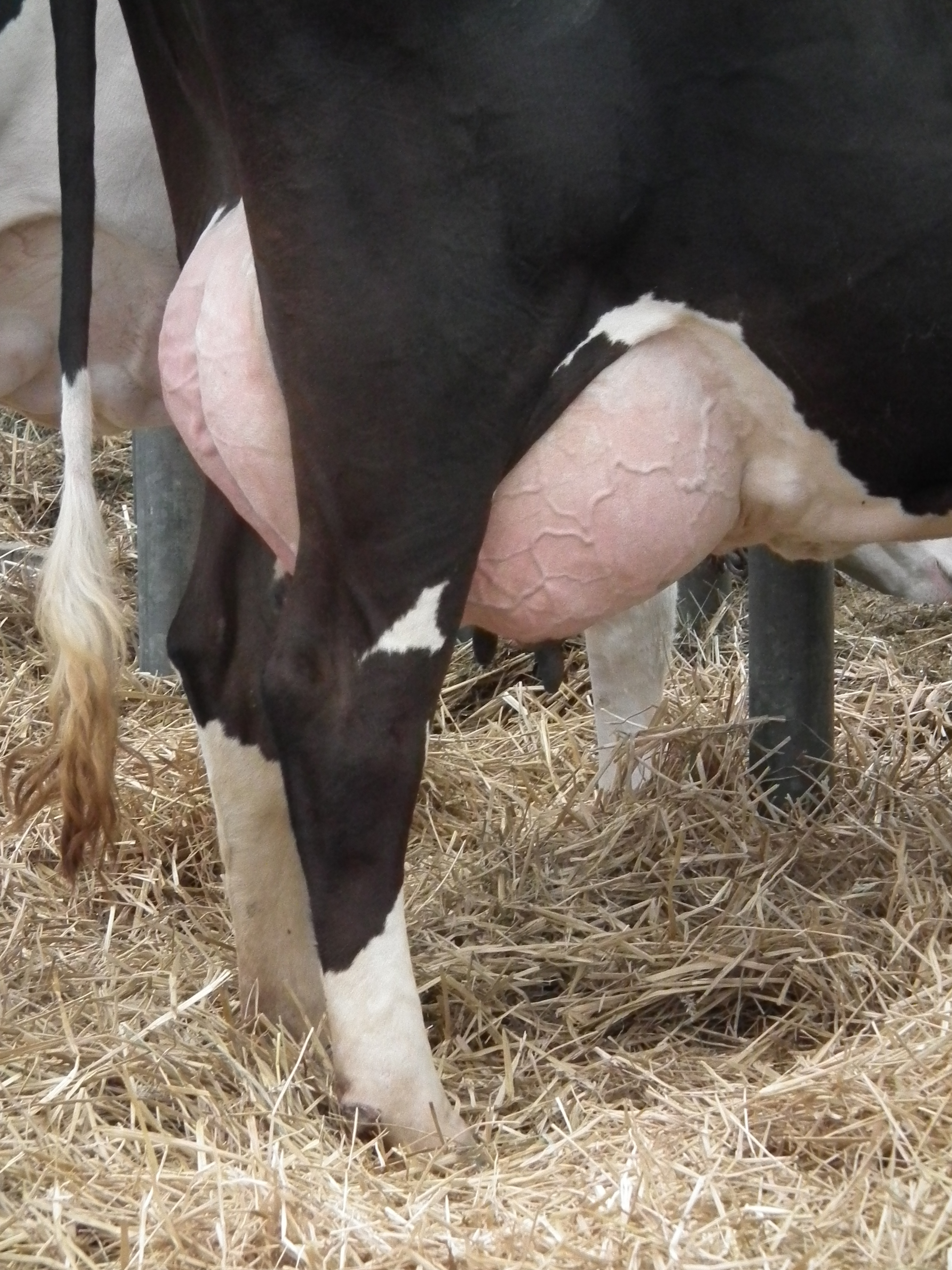
Udders of a Holstein cow.

== Reactions and media coverage ==
As early as 1999, a study established that selecting dogs and cats on physical criteria with no adaptive function creates suffering. According to Jean-Pierre Digard (2008), "it is not in man's interest to mistreat animals, nor to impose on them breeding or selection conditions (hypertypes) that are contrary to their short-term well-being, and to the very survival of certain farms in the long term: this is harmful to both animal and human health, including psychological health".

The BBC aired an investigation in 2009, Pedigree Dogs Exposed, in which several vets spoke out on dog hypertyping. They believe it produces "monsters", condemns affected animals to shorter, less pleasant lives, and jeopardizes the very survival of certain breeds. Veterinarian Dr. Irène Sommerfeldstur cites the "deadly sins of modern dog breeding" as extreme or abnormal exaggeration of features, and the quest for ever larger or ever smaller sizes. In a 2014 article in La Dépêche vétérinaire, Maud Lafon considers that these aesthetic "improvements" "sometimes border on the grotesque". Veterinarians are calling for a limit on the number of studs per sire to stem the loss of genetic diversity, the systematic removal of all sick or disabled individuals from breeding, and a change in the criteria for scoring in dog and cat shows.

== Bibliography ==
- Belkhir, Séverine; Bedossa, Thierry (2011). Association AVA – Aide aux vieux animaux (ed.). "Sélection : l'état des lieux alarmant dressé par les scientifiques et les solutions à apporter" (PDF). AVA (in French).
- Galtier, Eva (2013). Le chien comme objet esthétique (in French). Paris: Université Paris I Panthéon-Sorbonne, mémoire de Master II.
- Harrison, Jemima (19 August 2008). Chiens de race, les maîtres fous [Pedigree Dogs Exposed] (in French). Originally produce by BBC One. France 2.
- Lafon, Maud (2014) [October, 2014]. "Hypertype: quand le mieux est l'ennemi du bien" (PDF). La dépêche vétérinaire (in French) (1275): 8–13. Archived from the original (PDF) on 10 January 2015.
- Tsaag Valren, Amélie (2015). "Hypertypes : l'élevage du côté obscur". Cheval Savoir (in French) (61).
- Laetitia Bataille; Amélie Tsaag Valren (January 2017). Races équines de France (in French). Paris: éditions France Agricole. ISBN 978-2-85557-481-3. OCLC 971243118. Wikidata Q27688969.
