= Soko Tierschutz =

German animal rights organization

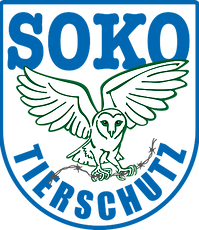
- Founded: 2012; 14 years ago
- Founder: Friedrich Mülln
- Founded at: Munich, Germany
- Purpose: Animal testing, Animal rights, Animal welfare
- Location: Augsburg, Germany
- Region served: Europe; China
- Method: Education, research, undercover work in laboratories, and lawsuits
- Website: www.soko-tierschutz.org

Soko Tierschutz (Animal Protection Special Unit) is a German animal rights organization which conducts undercover investigations of farms and animal research laboratories. In December 2014, Soko Tierschutz organized around 800 people to protest against research on non-human primates in Germany.

== See also ==
- Animal rights movement
- List of animal rights advocates
- List of animal rights groups
- Veganism
