= Animal welfare and rights in Germany =

Treatment of and laws concerning non-human animals in Germany

In 2014 Germany received a B out of possible grades A, B, C, D, E, F, G on World Animal Protection's Animal Protection Index. This was lowered to a C grade in their 2020 Animal Protection Index.

== Animals used for food ==
=== Animal agriculture ===
The German poultry industry consists of approximately 34 million laying hens, 60 million broilers, and 11 million turkeys. There are around 12.9 million head of cattle in total, including dairy cows and suckler cows. In 2011 Germany had Europe's largest pig population at over 27.4 million.

In 2016, a German court ruled that chick culling, in which male chicks are killed by being gassed or ground alive, does not violate animal protection laws. Several million chicks are killed by these methods in Germany each year.

=== Veganism ===
A 2009 survey found that 9% of German respondents identified as vegetarian. Data on the prevalence of veganism is not available.

== Animals used in research ==
In 2016, 2.19 million procedures were performed on animals in research. When animals killed for tissues or organs (but not undergoing any prior procedure) are included the number of animals is just under 2.80 million. The number of animals rose steadily from around 1.8 million in 2000 to over 3 million in 2014, before coming back down below 3 million. In 2016, 61% of procedures were classified as mild, 23% as moderate, 5% as severe, and 11% as non-recovery (in which the animal is anaesthetised and never woken up).

In 2014, animal activists released graphic undercover footage of monkeys being used for brain research in Germany, provoking a public outcry. The monkeys in the video were bloodied, obviously distressed, and some were left in cages without food or water to make them compliant with the experimental procedures.

A 2009 German opinion poll found that 89% of Germans agreed that the European Union protection laws should forbid all animal testing that causes pain and suffering.

== Animal activism ==
The Albert Schweitzer Foundation (ASF) is a German animal non-profit focused on helping farmed animals through corporate outreach campaigns to adopt higher-welfare policies (e.g. cage-free eggs), vegan outreach, and other activities. In 2016 it was one of Animal Charity Evaluators' Standout Charities, and up to 2021 it was a Top Charity.

SOKO Tierschutz is a German animal rights organization which conducts undercover investigations of farms and animal research laboratories. In December 2014, SOKO Tierschutz organized around 800 people to protest against research on non-human primates in Germany.

== See also ==
- Animal consciousness
- Animal rights movement
- Animal welfare in Nazi Germany
- Cruelty to animals
- Timeline of animal welfare and rights
- Timeline of animal welfare and rights in Europe
