= Shell bill =

In the United States, a shell bill is a legislative bill, typically with no substantive provisions, that is introduced for purposes of later being amended to include the actual legislative proposals advanced by the introducer. This device is used for a number of purposes, such as conforming to the rules adopted by a legislative body as to timely introduction of legislation, or abiding by constitutional procedural requirements.

== See also ==
- Substitute amendment
- Legislative vehicle
- Origination Clause of the United States Constitution
