= Substitute amendment =

Parliamentary procedure

In parliamentary procedure, a substitute amendment is an amendment that replaces a portion or all of the wording in a proposal.

== Legislatures ==
In legislatures, a substitute amendment kills a bill by replacing it if the amendment is passed.

Legislative bodies sometimes have special rules regarding this type of amendment. For example, the Continental Congress had a rule stating: "No new motion or proposition shall be admitted under color of amendment as a substitute for a question or proposition under debate until it is postponed or disagreed to."

=== United States Congress ===
In the United States Congress, substitute amendments are often used to replace the text of a bill that is no longer being considered with the text of an unrelated bill. In this case, it is said that the former bill is being used as a legislative vehicle for the latter. This has the effect of skipping steps of the legislative process, such as the need for a bill to be passed by a Congressional committee. This is possible because there is no general requirement that amendments offered by senators on the floor must be germane or relevant to the bill being considered.

== Other assemblies ==
In other deliberative assemblies, using Robert's Rules of Order, a substitute amendment is a form of the motion to amend. It could be debated, modified, and voted on like other amendments.

A substitute can be a sentence, paragraph, section, or article within a motion or resolution, or it can be the entire motion or resolution.

It could be used to improve a poorly worded motion or resolution which helps to pass it.

=== Procedure ===
When a substitute is proposed, both the substitute and the wording of the motion that is being substituted for are considered. In this case, the substitute could be amended and the original motion could be amended.

Then a vote is taken on whether to put the substitute (with any modifications) in place of the original motion (with any modifications).

This makes it fair for the proponents of the original motion (if only the substitute could be considered and passed, then the proponents of the original motion wouldn't get a chance to advocate and possibly improve their motion if that was the case).

If the substitute amendment passed, the main motion as amended would still need to be voted on.

== See also ==
- Shell bill
- Amend (motion)
