= Second-degree amendment =

In parliamentary procedure using Robert's Rules of Order, the wording of a motion could be changed by an amendment. This amendment is called a primary amendment, or first-degree amendment. A secondary amendment, or second-degree amendment is an amendment of an amendment. Secondary amendments are handled like other amendments in that they can be debated and voted on before moving forward.

== Example ==
For example, in a situation where a resolution is being considered for the purchase of a new building, the motion may read as follows:

"That the organization purchase a facility for the purpose of continuing operations."

An amendment to this motion might insert the words "In Nashville" to specify where the building would be purchased. In this case, "in Nashville" is the primary amendment.

A second-degree amendment would amend the original amendment to insert the words "in South Nashville". "South" would be the secondary amendment. In this manner, the motion would then amend the text to read:

"That the organization purchase a facility in South Nashville for the purpose of continuing operations."

== Tertiary amendment not allowed ==
A tertiary amendment, or third-degree amendment, is an amendment of an amendment to an amendment and is not allowed because it would be too complicated.

== See also ==
- Amend (motion)
