= Deutsche Jägerschaft =

German hunting society (1934–1945)

- Formation: 1934
- Founder: Hermann Göring
- Dissolved: 1945
- Legal status: Statutory corporation
- Purpose: Improve hunting culture; Propagate Nazi ideology
- Headquarters: Berlin
- Members: Mandatory
- Reichsjägermeister: Hermann Göring
- Oberstjägermeister: Ulrich Scherping
- Main organ: Der deutsche Jäger

Deutsche Jägerschaft ('German Hunting Society') was the official hunting society in Nazi Germany, 1934–1945. Membership was mandatory for all who possessed a hunting license.

== Origin ==
The Deutsche Jägerschaft was created through the Reichsjagdgesetz ('National Hunting Act') of 1934. Existing hunting societies were disbanded and the membership transferred to the new society.

== Mission ==
- Educate the hunting community to practice an ethical hunting culture.
- Preserve the wildlife population unchanged to the benefit of future generations.
- Jews were excluded from membership even if they owned hunting grounds.

== Organization ==
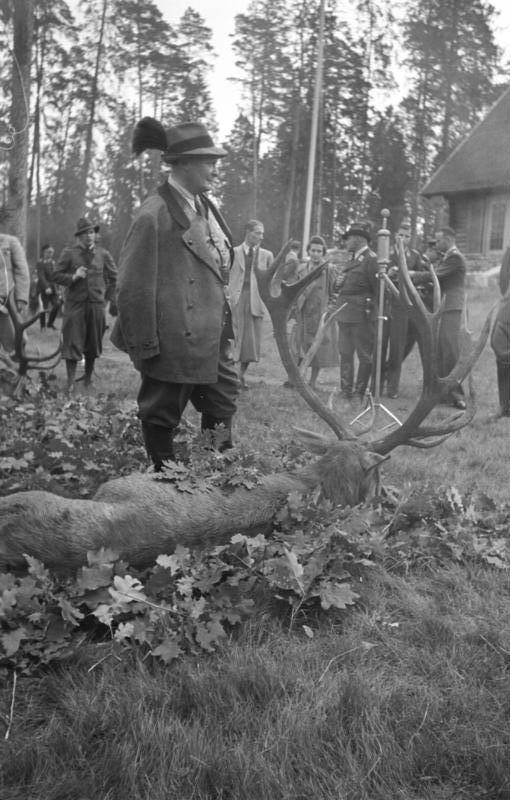
Reichsjägermeister Hermann Göring with his prey, 1939

The Deutsche Jägerschaft was a statutory corporation with mandatory membership for all who possessed a hunting license. The membership was in hunting matters subordinate to the jurisdiction of the Deutsche Jägerschaft through its system of honorary courts. Deutsche Jägerschaft was led by Hermann Göring, as Reichsjägermeister, and was governed by the Führerprinciple. Elected officials did not exist; all functionaries were appointed by their superiors in the internal chain of command. Göring's deputy and leader of the daily work was Walter von Keudell until 1937. Administrative leader was Oberstjägermeister Ulrich Scherping.

Deutsche Jägerschaft was organized in a number of Jagdgaue. Some Länder had a Landesjägermeister as leader of the Gaujägermeisters. Each Jagdgau contained a number of Jagdkreise under a Kreisjägermeister. Each Jagdkreis had a number of Hegeringen ('Game Management Areas') under a Hegeringsleiter. Thüringen, for instance, formed a Jagdgau with 15 Jagdkreise that were state wildlife agencies. The Institute für Jagdkunde ('Hunting Science Institute') and the Deutsche Versuchsanstalt für Handfeuerwaffen ('German Research Station for Small Arms') also came under the Deutsche Jägerschaft.

== Rank structure ==
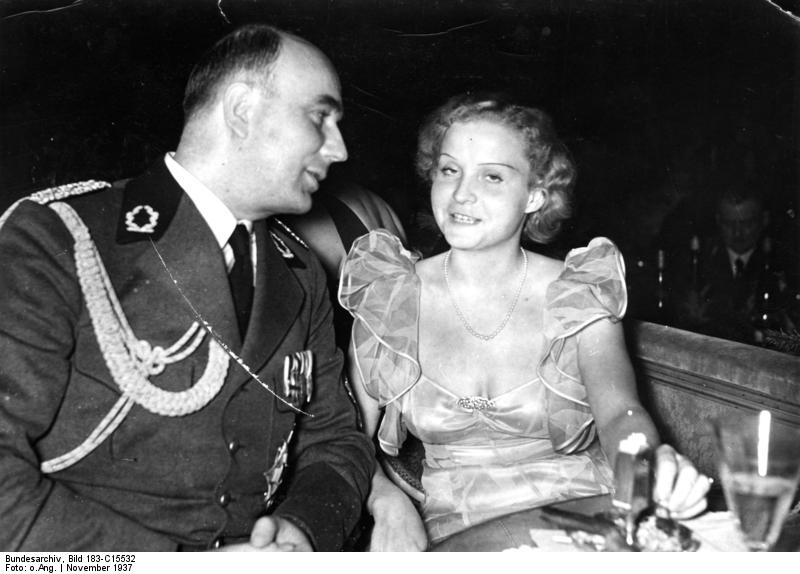
Arthur Greiser in the uniform of a Gaujägermeister.

- Reichsjägermeister Göring
- Oberstjägermeister Ulrich Scherping
- Landesjägermeister
- Gaujägermeister
- Oberjägermeister
- Stabsjägermeister by Landesjägermeister/Jägermeister by Reichsjägermeister
- Kreisjägermeister
- Stabsjägermeister by Gaujägermeister/Jägermeister by Landesjägermeister
- Hegeringsleiter

== Dissolution ==
The Allied Powers dissolved the Deutsche Jägerschaft in 1945, and its assets and properties were confiscated.

== Flags ==
Reichsjägermeister

Staff of the Reichsjägermeister

Members of the Reichsjagdrat

Landesjägermeister

Gaujägermeister

Kreisjägermeister

Ordinary Member
