= Amendment =

Formal or official change made to a law, contract, constitution, or other legal document

An amendment is a formal or official change made to a law, contract, constitution, or other legal document. It is based on the verb to amend, which means to change for better. Amendments can add, remove, or update parts of these agreements. They are often used when it is better to change the document than to write a new one. Only the legislative branch is involved in the amendment process.

== Contracts ==
Contracts are often amended when the market changes. For example, a contract to deliver something to a customer once a month can be amended if the customer wants it delivered once a week. Usually Contracts also are categorized for their promotion in a nation, such as the Treaty of Versailles.

== Law ==
=== Legislation ===
Legislation which is intended to retain a previous law subject to certain additions, omissions or revisions is often referred to as "amending legislation", and the title of a law passed to have this effect may often include the work "amendment", for example the ADA Amendments Act of 2008 in the United States, the Citizenship (Amendment) Act, 2019 in India and the Race Relations (Amendment) Act 2000 in the UK.

In parliamentary procedure, a motion is a proposal to do something. The wording of such a proposal can be changed with a motion to amend. Amendments can remove words, add words, or change words in motions. All main motions and some secondary motions can be amended. An amendment can be amended.

=== Constitutions ===
Some of the most famous constitutional amendments are the First Amendment to the United States Constitution which added the freedom of speech, religion, press, and protest, the Third Amendment of the Constitution of Ireland, which let Ireland join the European Union, and the amendment of the German constitution as part of the German reunification process in 1990. Constitutional amendments in some countries—for example, Australia—must be approved by both the parliament or legislature and a national referendum.

== See also ==
- Friendly amendment
- Non-textual amendment
- Second-degree amendment
- Substitute amendment
