= President of the United States =

Head of state and government

- Presidential seal

- Presidential flag

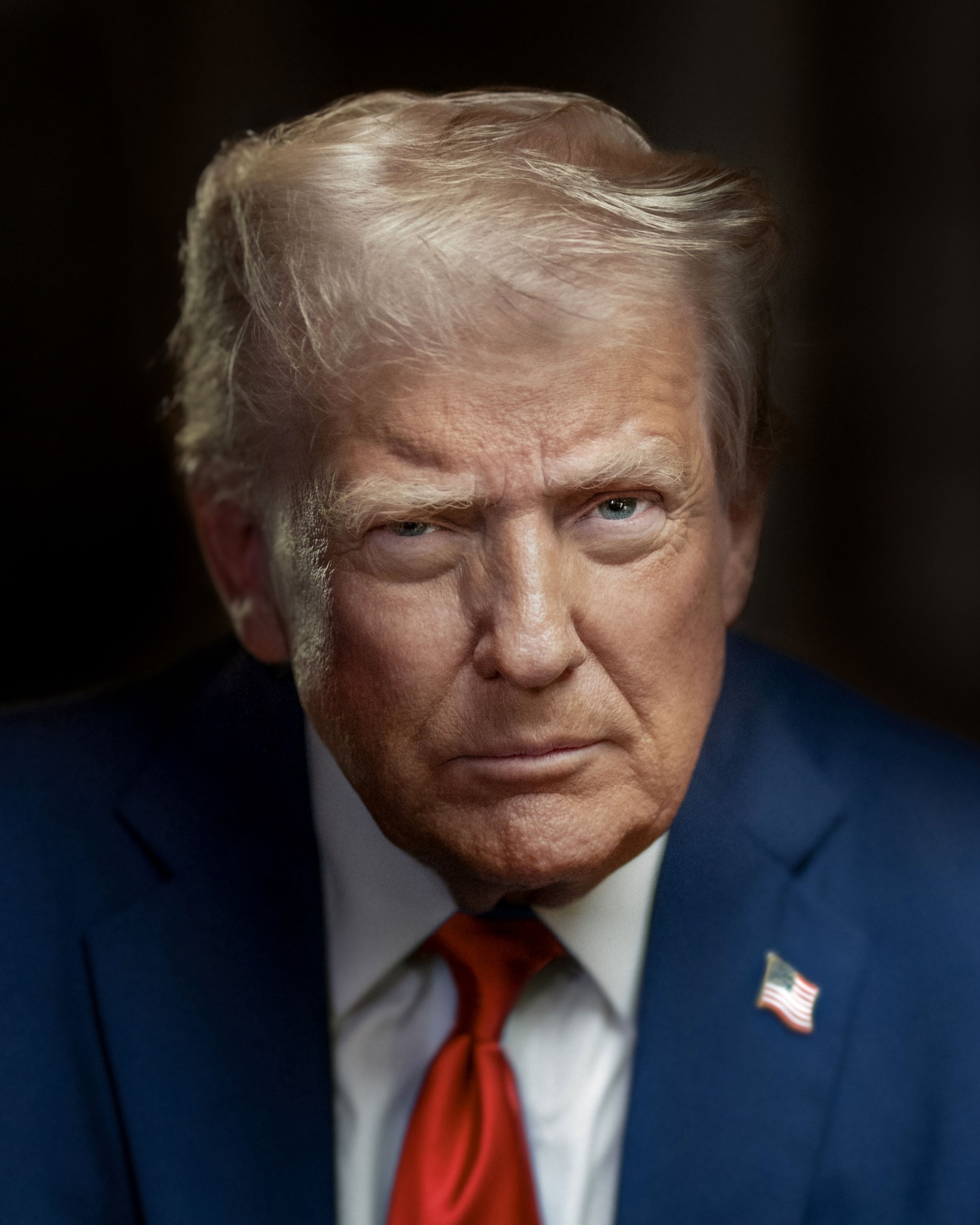
- Incumbent; Donald Trump since January 20, 2025
- Executive branch of the U.S. government; Executive Office of the President of the United States
- Style: Mr./Madam President (informal); The Honorable (formal); His/Her Excellency (diplomatic)
- Type: Head of state; Head of government; Commander-in-chief
- Abbreviation: POTUS
- Member of: Cabinet; Domestic Policy Council; National Economic Council; National Security Council
- Residence: White House
- Seat: Washington, D.C.
- Term length: Four years; (renewable once)
- Constituting instrument: Constitution of the United States (1789)
- Formation: March 4, 1789 (237 years ago)
- First holder: George Washington
- Succession: Line of succession
- Salary: $400,000 per year (Note: In addition to $100,000 in travel reimbursement, $19,000 for entertainment and $50,000 for additional expenses.)
- Website: www.whitehouse.gov

The president of the United States (POTUS) (Note: The informal term POTUS originated in the Phillips Code, a shorthand method created in 1879 by Walter P. Phillips for the rapid transmission of press reports by telegraph.) is the head of state and head of government of the United States. The president directs the executive branch of the federal government and is the commander-in-chief of the United States Armed Forces.

The power of the presidency has grown since the first president, George Washington, took office in 1789. While presidential power has ebbed and flowed over time, the presidency has played an increasing role in American political life since the beginning of the 20th century, carrying over into the 21st century with some expansions during the presidencies of Franklin D. Roosevelt and George W. Bush. In the 21st century, the president is one of the world's most powerful political figures and the leader of a superpower. As the leader of the nation with the largest economy by nominal GDP, the president possesses significant domestic and international hard and soft power. For much of the 20th century, especially during the Cold War, the U.S. president was often called "the leader of the free world".

Article II of the Constitution establishes the executive branch of the federal government and vests executive power in the president. The power includes the execution and enforcement of federal law and the responsibility to appoint federal executive, diplomatic, regulatory, and judicial officers. Based on constitutional provisions empowering the president to appoint and receive ambassadors and conclude treaties with foreign powers, and on subsequent laws enacted by Congress, the modern presidency has primary responsibility for conducting U.S. foreign policy. The role includes responsibility for directing the world's most expensive military, which has the second-largest nuclear arsenal.

The president also plays a leading role in federal legislation and domestic policymaking. As part of the system of separation of powers, Article I, Section 7 of the Constitution gives the president the power to sign or veto federal legislation. Since modern presidents are typically viewed as leaders of their political parties, major policymaking is significantly shaped by the outcome of presidential elections, with presidents taking an active role in promoting their policy priorities to members of Congress who are often electorally dependent on the president. Over time, presidents have also made increasing use of executive orders, agency regulations, and judicial appointments to shape domestic policy.

The president is elected through the Electoral College to a four-year term, along with the vice president. Under the Twenty-second Amendment, ratified in 1951, no person who has been elected to two presidential terms may be elected to a third. In addition, nine vice presidents have become president by virtue of a president's intra-term death or resignation. (Note: The nine vice presidents who succeeded to the presidency upon their predecessor's death or resignation and served for the remainder of his term are: John Tyler (1841); Millard Fillmore (1850); Andrew Johnson (1865); Chester A. Arthur (1881); Theodore Roosevelt (1901); Calvin Coolidge (1923); Harry S. Truman (1945); Lyndon B. Johnson (1963); and Gerald Ford (1974).) In all, 45 individuals have served, or are serving, 47 presidencies as of the current 60th four-year term. (Note: Grover Cleveland and Donald Trump are each counted twice due to serving two nonconsecutive terms.) Donald Trump is the 47th and current president since January 20, 2025.

== History and development ==
=== Origins ===
In July 1776, the Thirteen Colonies, represented at the Second Continental Congress in Philadelphia, unanimously adopted the United States Declaration of Independence in which the colonies declared themselves to be independent sovereign states and no longer under British rule. The affirmation was made in the Declaration of Independence, which was written predominantly by Thomas Jefferson and adopted unanimously on July 4, 1776, by the Second Continental Congress. Recognizing the necessity of closely coordinating their efforts against the British, the Continental Congress simultaneously began the process of drafting a constitution that would bind the states together. There were long debates on a number of issues, including representation and voting, and the exact powers to be given the central government. Congress finished work on the Articles of Confederation to establish a perpetual union between the states in November 1777 and sent it to the states for ratification.

Under the Articles, which took effect on March 1, 1781, the Congress of the Confederation was a central political authority without any legislative power. It could make its own resolutions, determinations, and regulations, but not any laws, and could not impose any taxes or enforce local commercial regulations upon its citizens. This institutional design reflected how Americans believed the deposed British system of Crown and Parliament ought to have functioned with respect to the royal dominion: a superintending body for matters that concerned the entire empire.

The states were out from under any monarchy and assigned some formerly royal prerogatives (e.g., making war, receiving ambassadors, etc.) to Congress; the remaining prerogatives were lodged within their own respective state governments. The members of Congress elected a president of the United States in Congress Assembled to preside over its deliberation as a neutral discussion moderator. Unrelated to and quite dissimilar from the later office of president of the United States, it was a largely ceremonial position with no executive powers other than presiding over a parliamentary body.

In 1783, the Treaty of Paris secured independence for each of the former colonies. With peace at hand, the states each turned toward their own internal affairs. By 1786, Americans found their continental borders besieged and weak and their respective economies in crises as neighboring states agitated trade rivalries with one another. They witnessed their hard currency pouring into foreign markets to pay for imports, their Mediterranean commerce preyed upon by North African pirates, and their foreign-financed Revolutionary War debts unpaid and accruing interest. Civil and political unrest loomed. Events such as the Newburgh Conspiracy and Shays' Rebellion demonstrated that the Articles of Confederation were not working, in particular that a stronger national government with an empowered executive was necessary.

Following the successful resolution of commercial and fishing disputes between Virginia and Maryland at the Mount Vernon Conference in 1785, Virginia called for a trade conference between all the states, set for September 1786 in Annapolis, Maryland, with an aim toward resolving further-reaching interstate commercial antagonisms. When the convention failed for lack of attendance due to suspicions among most of the other states, Alexander Hamilton of New York led the Annapolis delegates in a call for a convention to offer revisions to the Articles, to be held the next spring in Philadelphia. Prospects for the next convention appeared bleak until James Madison and Edmund Randolph succeeded in securing George Washington's attendance to Philadelphia as a delegate for Virginia.

When the Constitutional Convention convened in May 1787, the 12 state delegations in attendance (Rhode Island did not send delegates) brought with them an accumulated experience over a diverse set of institutional arrangements between legislative and executive branches from within their respective state governments. Most states maintained a weak executive without veto or appointment powers, elected annually by the legislature to a single term only, sharing power with an executive council, and countered by a strong legislature. New York offered the greatest exception, having a strong, unitary governor with veto and appointment power elected to a three-year term, and eligible for reelection to an indefinite number of terms thereafter. It was through the closed-door negotiations at Philadelphia that the presidency framed in the U.S. Constitution emerged.

=== 1789–1933 ===
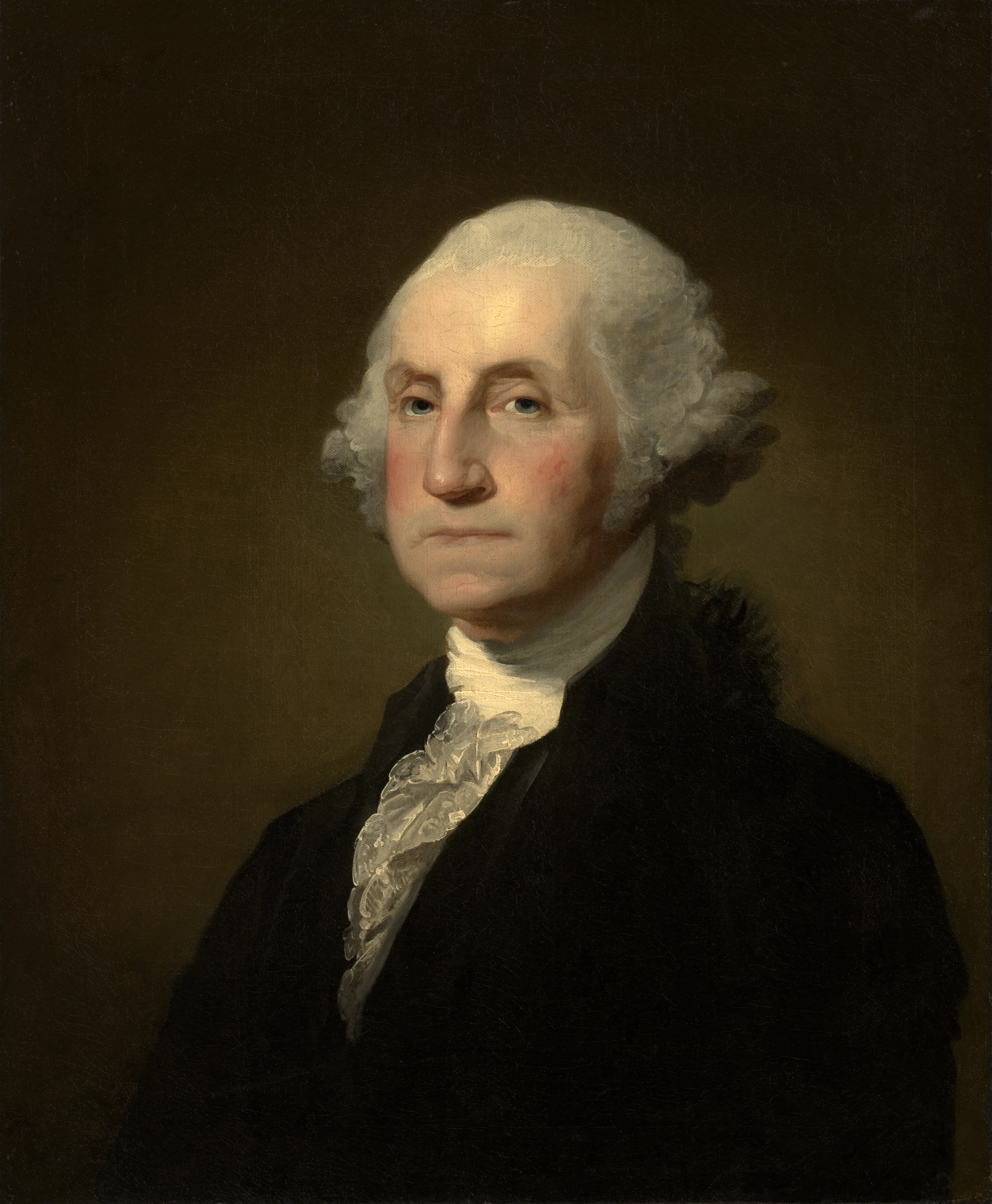
George Washington, the first president of the United States

As the nation's first president, George Washington established many norms that would come to define the office. His decision to retire after two terms helped address fears that the nation would devolve into monarchy and established a precedent that would not be broken until 1940 and would eventually be made permanent by the Twenty-Second Amendment. By the end of his presidency, political parties had developed, with John Adams defeating Thomas Jefferson in 1796, the first truly contested presidential election. After Jefferson defeated Adams in 1800, he along with James Madison and James Monroe would each serve two terms, eventually dominating the nation's politics during the Era of Good Feelings until Adams' son John Quincy Adams won election in 1824 after the Democratic-Republican Party split.

The election of Andrew Jackson in 1828 was the first time someone outside of the Virginia and Massachusetts elite won the presidency, 40 years after Washington got elected. Jacksonian democracy sought to strengthen the presidency at the expense of Congress, while broadening public participation as the nation rapidly expanded westward. However, his successor, Martin Van Buren, became unpopular after the Panic of 1837, and the death of William Henry Harrison and subsequent poor relations between John Tyler and Congress led to further weakening of the office.

Including Van Buren, in the 24 years between 1837 and 1861, six presidential terms were filled by eight different men, with none serving two terms. The Senate played an important role during this period, with the Great Triumvirate of Henry Clay, Daniel Webster, and John C. Calhoun playing key roles in shaping national policy in the 1830s and 1840s, until debates over slavery began pulling the nation apart in the 1850s.

Abraham Lincoln's leadership during the Civil War has led historians to regard him as one of the nation's greatest presidents. (Note: Nearly all scholars rank Lincoln among the nation's top three presidents, with many placing him first. See Historical rankings of presidents of the United States for a collection of survey results.) The circumstances of the war and Republican domination of Congress made the office very powerful. Lincoln's re-election in 1864 was the first time a president had been re-elected since Jackson in 1832. After Lincoln's assassination, his successor Andrew Johnson lost all political support and was nearly removed from office. Congress remained powerful during the two-term presidency of Civil War general Ulysses S. Grant. After the end of Reconstruction, Grover Cleveland was the first Democratic president elected since before the war, running in three consecutive elections (1884, 1888, 1892) and winning twice. In 1900, William McKinley became the first incumbent to win re-election since Grant in 1872.

After McKinley's assassination by Leon Czolgosz in 1901, Theodore Roosevelt became a dominant figure in American politics. Historians believe Roosevelt permanently changed the political system by strengthening the presidency, with some key accomplishments including breaking up trusts, conservationism, labor reforms, making personal character as important as the issues, and hand-picking his successor, William Howard Taft. In the 1910s, Woodrow Wilson led the nation to victory during World War I, although Wilson's proposal for the League of Nations was rejected by the Senate. Warren Harding, while popular in office, would see his legacy tarnished by scandals, especially Teapot Dome, and Herbert Hoover quickly became very unpopular after failing to alleviate the Great Depression.

=== Imperial presidency ===
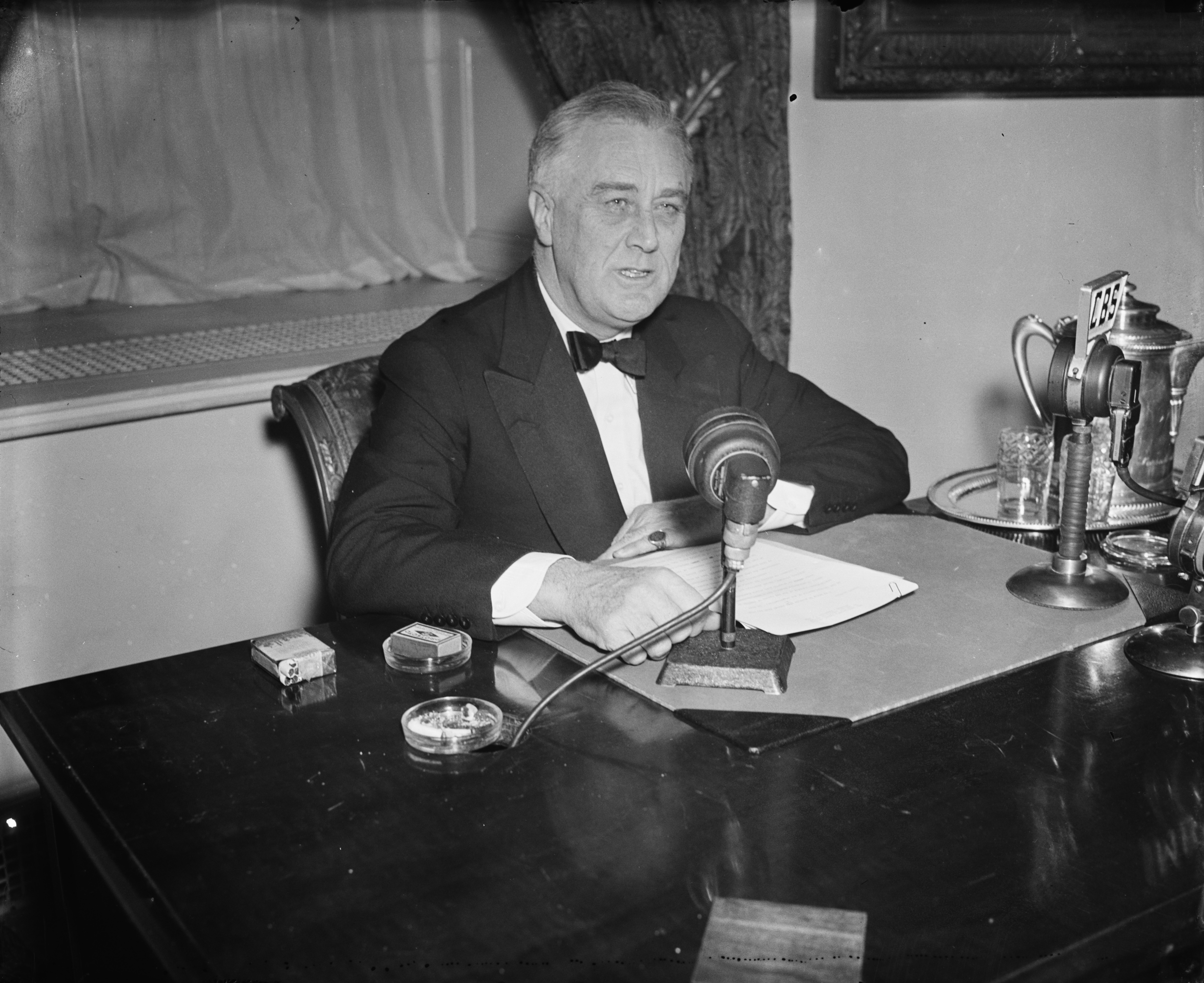
President Franklin D. Roosevelt delivers a radio address in 1933

The ascendancy of Franklin D. Roosevelt in 1933 led further toward what historian Arthur M. Schlesinger Jr. characterized as the imperial presidency. Backed by enormous Democratic majorities in Congress and public support for major change, Roosevelt's New Deal dramatically increased the size and scope of the federal government, including more executive agencies. The traditionally small presidential staff was greatly expanded, with the Executive Office of the President being created in 1939, none of whom require Senate confirmation.

Roosevelt's unprecedented re-election to a third and fourth term, the victory of the United States in World War II, and the nation's growing economy all helped established the office as a position of global leadership. His successors, Harry S. Truman and Dwight D. Eisenhower, each served two terms as the Cold War led the presidency to be viewed as the "leader of the free world", while John F. Kennedy was a youthful and popular leader who benefited from the rise of television in the 1960s.

After Lyndon B. Johnson lost popular support due to the Vietnam War and Richard Nixon's presidency collapsed in the Watergate scandal, Congress enacted a series of reforms intended to reassert itself. These included the War Powers Resolution, enacted over Nixon's veto in 1973, and the Congressional Budget and Impoundment Control Act of 1974 that sought to strengthen congressional fiscal powers. By 1976, Gerald Ford conceded that "the historic pendulum" had swung toward Congress, raising the possibility of a "disruptive" erosion of his ability to govern. Ford failed to win election to a full term and his successor, Jimmy Carter, failed to win re-election. Ronald Reagan, who had been an actor before beginning his political career, used his talent as a communicator to help reshape the American agenda away from New Deal policies toward more conservative ideology.

After the Cold War, the United States became the world's undisputed leading power. Bill Clinton, George W. Bush, and Barack Obama each served two terms as president. Meanwhile, the nation gradually became more politically polarized, leading to the ascendency of increasingly polarized Congressmembers, especially following the 1994 mid-term elections which saw Republicans control the House for the first time in 40 years, and the rise of routine filibusters in the Senate. Recent presidents have thus increasingly focused on executive orders, agency regulations, and judicial appointments to implement major policies, at the expense of legislation and congressional power. Presidential elections in the 21st century have reflected this continuing polarization, with no candidate except Obama in 2008 winning by more than five percent of the popular vote and two, George W. Bush (2000) and Donald Trump (2016), winning in the Electoral College while losing the popular vote. (Note: See List of United States presidential elections by popular vote margin.) Bush (2004) and Trump (2024) were later re-elected, winning both in the Electoral College and the popular vote.

=== Critics of presidency's evolution ===
The nation's Founding Fathers expected the Congress, which was the first branch of government described in the Constitution, to be the dominant branch of government; they did not expect a strong executive department. However, presidential power has shifted over time, which has resulted in claims that the modern presidency has become too powerful, unchecked, unbalanced, and "monarchist" in nature.

In 2008 professor Dana D. Nelson expressed belief that presidents over the previous thirty years worked towards "undivided presidential control of the executive branch and its agencies". She criticized proponents of the unitary executive theory for expanding "the many existing uncheckable executive powers—such as executive orders, decrees, memorandums, proclamations, national security directives and legislative signing statements—that already allow presidents to enact a good deal of foreign and domestic policy without aid, interference or consent from Congress". Bill Wilson, board member of Americans for Limited Government, opined that the expanded presidency was "the greatest threat ever to individual freedom and democratic rule".

Constitutional scholar Stephen M. Griffin argues that the U.S. Constitution's emphasis on stability has discouraged formal amendments to clarify the distribution of governmental powers, while presidential authority in national security has expanded through informal constitutional change.

== Legislative powers ==
Article I, Section 1 of the Constitution vests all lawmaking power in Congress's hands, and Article 1, Section 6, Clause 2 prevents the president (and all other executive branch officers) from simultaneously being a member of Congress. Nevertheless, the modern presidency exerts significant power over legislation, both due to constitutional provisions and historical developments over time.

=== Signing and vetoing bills ===
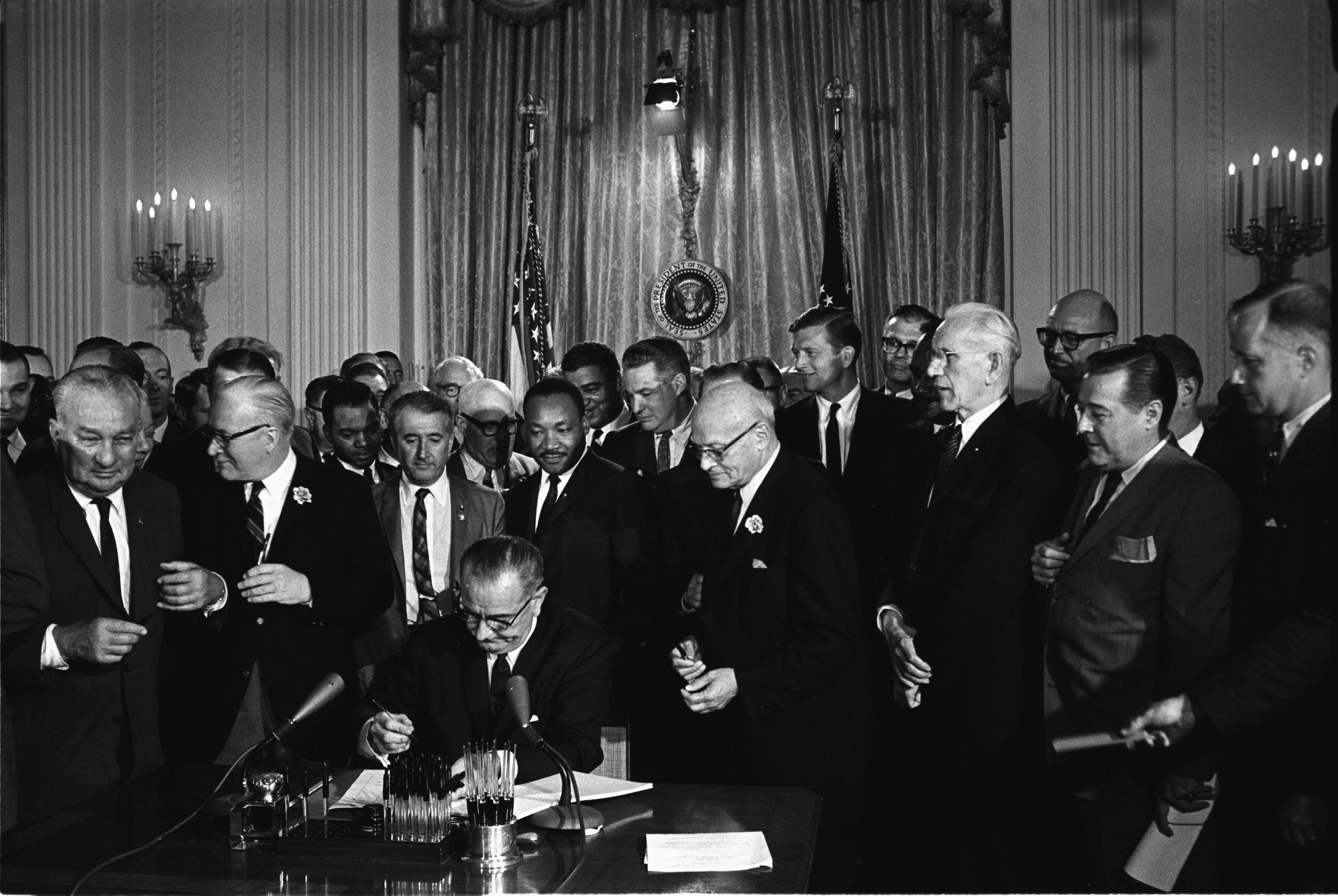
President Lyndon B. Johnson signs the 1964 Civil Rights Act at the White House on July 2, 1964, as Martin Luther King Jr. and others look on

The president's most significant legislative power derives from the Presentment Clause, which gives the president the power to veto any bill passed by Congress. While Congress can override a presidential veto, it requires a two-thirds vote of both houses, which is usually very difficult to achieve except for widely supported bipartisan legislation. The framers of the Constitution feared that Congress would seek to increase its power and enable a "tyranny of the majority", so giving the indirectly elected president a veto was viewed as an important check on the legislative power.

While George Washington believed the veto should only be used in cases where a bill was unconstitutional, it is now routinely used in cases where presidents have policy disagreements with a bill. The veto – or threat of a veto – has thus evolved to make the modern presidency a central part of the American legislative process.

Specifically, under the Presentment Clause, once a bill has been presented by Congress, the president has three options:

1. Sign the legislation within ten days, excluding Sundays. The bill becomes law.
2. Veto the legislation within the above timeframe and return it to the house of Congress from which it originated, expressing any objections. The bill does not become law, unless both houses of Congress vote to override the veto by a two-thirds vote.
3. Take no action on the legislation within the above timeframe. The bill becomes law, as if the president had signed it, unless Congress is adjourned at the time, in which case it does not become law, which is known as a pocket veto.

In 1996, Congress attempted to enhance the president's veto power with the Line Item Veto Act. The legislation empowered the president to sign any spending bill into law while simultaneously striking certain spending items within the bill, particularly any new spending, any amount of discretionary spending, or any new limited tax benefit. Congress could then repass that particular item. If the president then vetoed the new legislation, Congress could override the veto by its ordinary means, a two-thirds vote in both houses. In Clinton v. City of New York, 524 U.S. 417 (1998), the U.S. Supreme Court ruled such a legislative alteration of the veto power to be unconstitutional.

=== Setting the agenda ===
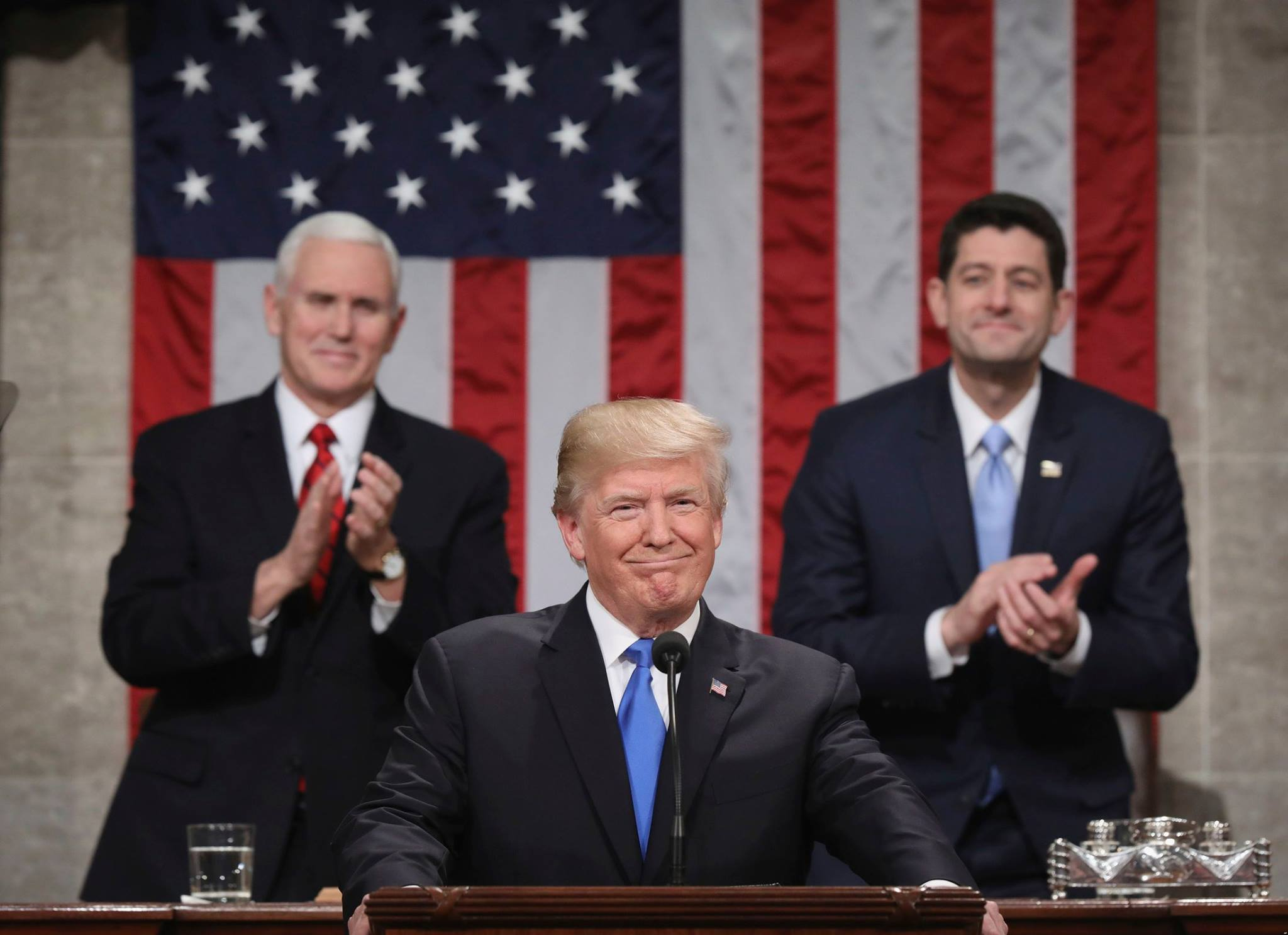
President Donald Trump delivers his 2018 State of the Union Address before Congress.

For most of American history, candidates for president have sought election on the basis of a promised legislative agenda. Article II, Section 3, Clause 2 requires the president to recommend such measures to Congress which the president deems "necessary and expedient". This is done through the constitutionally based State of the Union address, which usually outlines the president's legislative proposals for the coming year, and through other formal and informal communications with Congress.

The president can be involved in crafting legislation by suggesting, requesting, or even insisting that Congress enact laws that the president believes are needed. Additionally, the president can attempt to shape legislation during the legislative process by exerting influence on individual members of Congress. Presidents possess this power because the Constitution is silent about who can write legislation, but the power is limited because only members of Congress can introduce legislation.

The president or other officials of the executive branch may draft legislation and then ask senators or representatives to introduce these drafts into Congress. Additionally, the president may attempt to have Congress alter proposed legislation by threatening to veto that legislation unless requested changes are made.

=== Promulgating regulations ===
Many laws enacted by Congress do not address every possible detail, and either explicitly or implicitly delegate powers of implementation to an appropriate federal agency. As the head of the executive branch, presidents control a vast array of agencies that can issue regulations with little oversight from Congress.

In the 20th century, critics charged that too many legislative and budgetary powers that should have belonged to Congress had slid into the hands of presidents. One critic charged that presidents could appoint a "virtual army of 'czars'—each wholly unaccountable to Congress yet tasked with spearheading major policy efforts for the White House". Presidents have been criticized for making signing statements when signing congressional legislation about how they understand a bill or plan to execute it. This practice has been criticized by the American Bar Association as unconstitutional. Conservative commentator George Will wrote of an "increasingly swollen executive branch" and "the eclipse of Congress".

=== Convening and adjourning Congress ===
To allow the government to act quickly in case of a major domestic or international crisis arising when Congress is not in session, the president is empowered by Article II, Section 3 of the Constitution to call a special session of one or both houses of Congress. Since John Adams first did so in 1797, the president has called the full Congress to convene for a special session on 27 occasions. Harry S. Truman was the most recent to do so in July 1948, known as the Turnip Day Session.

In addition, prior to ratification of the Twentieth Amendment in 1933, which brought forward the date on which Congress convenes from December to January, newly inaugurated presidents would routinely call the Senate to meet to confirm nominations or ratify treaties. In practice, the power has fallen into disuse in the modern era as Congress now formally remains in session year-round, convening pro forma sessions every three days even when ostensibly in recess. Correspondingly, the president is authorized to adjourn Congress if the House and Senate cannot agree on the time of adjournment; no president has ever had to exercise this power.

== Executive powers ==
Suffice it to say that the President is made the sole repository of the executive powers of the United States, and the powers entrusted to him as well as the duties imposed upon him are awesome indeed.

— Nixon v. General Services Administration, 433 U.S. 425 (1977) (Rehnquist, J., dissenting)

The president is head of the executive branch of the federal government and is constitutionally obligated to "take care that the laws be faithfully executed". The executive branch has more than four million employees, including the military.

=== Administrative powers ===
Presidents make political appointments. An incoming president may make up to 4,000 upon taking office, 1,200 of which must be confirmed by the U.S. Senate. Ambassadors, members of the Cabinet, and various officers, are among the positions filled by presidential appointment with Senate confirmation.

The power of a president to fire executive officials has long been a contentious political issue. Generally, a president may remove executive officials at will. However, Congress can curtail and constrain a president's authority to fire commissioners of independent regulatory agencies and certain inferior executive officers by statute.

To manage the growing federal bureaucracy, presidents have gradually surrounded themselves with many layers of staff, who were eventually organized into the Executive Office of the President of the United States. Within the Executive Office, the president's innermost layer of aides, and their assistants, are located in the White House Office.

The president also possesses the power to manage operations of the federal government by issuing various types of directives, such as presidential proclamation and executive orders. When the president is lawfully exercising one of the constitutionally conferred presidential responsibilities, the scope of this power is broad. Even so, these directives are subject to judicial review by U.S. federal courts, which can find them to be unconstitutional. Congress can overturn an executive order through legislation.

=== Foreign affairs ===
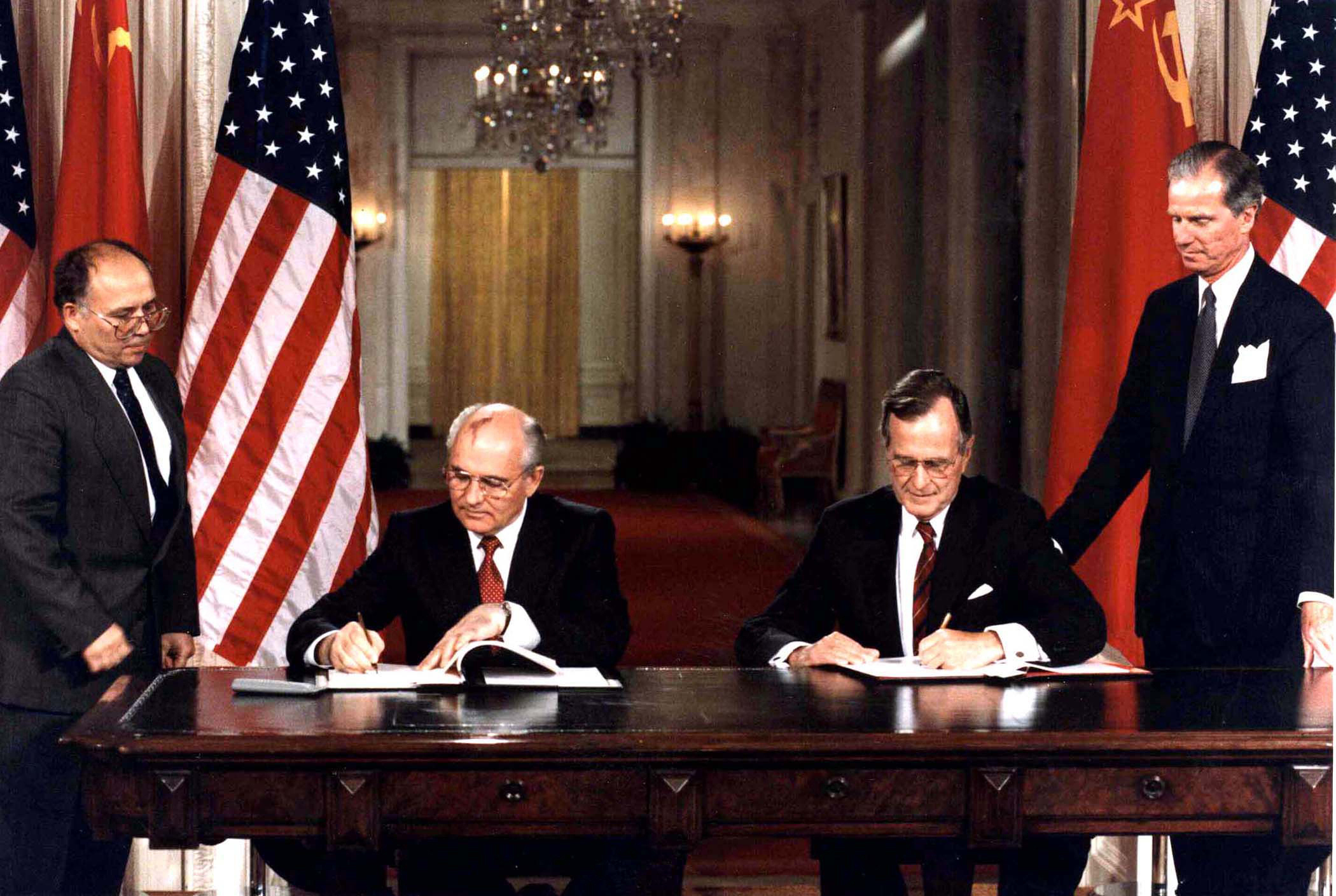
President George H. W. Bush and Soviet president Mikhail Gorbachev sign the 1990 Chemical Weapons Accord at the White House

Article II, Section 3, Clause 4 requires the president to "receive Ambassadors". This clause, known as the Reception Clause, has been interpreted to imply that the president possesses broad power over matters of foreign policy, and to provide support for the president's exclusive authority to grant recognition to a foreign government. The Constitution also empowers the president to appoint United States ambassadors, and to propose and chiefly negotiate agreements between the United States and other countries. Such agreements, upon receiving the advice and consent of the U.S. Senate (by a two-thirds majority vote), become binding with the force of federal law.

While foreign affairs has always been a significant element of presidential responsibilities, advances in technology since the Constitution's adoption have increased presidential power. Where formerly ambassadors were vested with significant power to independently negotiate on behalf of the United States, presidents now routinely meet directly with leaders of foreign countries.

=== Commander-in-chief ===
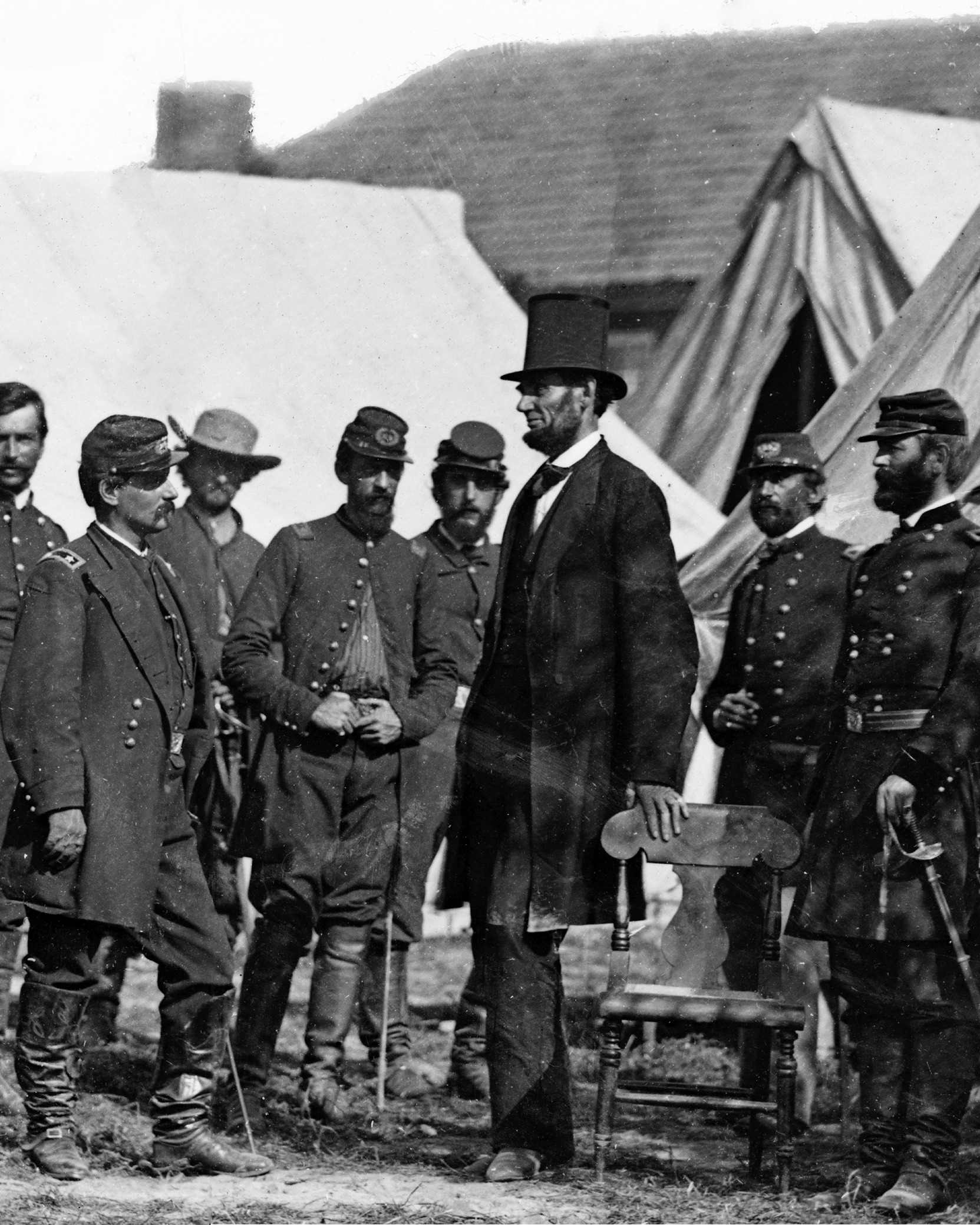
President Abraham Lincoln successfully preserved the Union during the American Civil War. Here he is (center) with General George B. McClellan (left), and soldiers at Antietam, on October 3, 1862

One of the most important of executive powers is the president's role as commander-in-chief of the United States Armed Forces. The power to declare war is constitutionally vested in Congress, but the president has ultimate responsibility for the direction and disposition of the military. The exact degree of authority that the Constitution grants to the president as commander-in-chief has been the subject of much debate throughout history, with Congress at various times granting the president wide authority and at others attempting to restrict that authority. The framers of the Constitution took care to limit the president's powers regarding the military; Alexander Hamilton explained this in Federalist No. 69:

The President is to be commander-in-chief of the army and navy of the United States. ... It would amount to nothing more than the supreme command and direction of the military and naval forces ... while that [the power] of the British king extends to the DECLARING of war and to the RAISING and REGULATING of fleets and armies, all [of] which ... would appertain to the legislature. [Emphasis in the original.]

In the modern era, pursuant to the War Powers Resolution, Congress must authorize any troop deployments longer than 60 days, although that process relies on triggering mechanisms that have never been employed, rendering it ineffectual. Additionally, Congress provides a check to presidential military power through its control over military spending and regulation. Presidents have historically initiated the process for going to war, but critics have charged that there have been several conflicts in which presidents did not get official declarations, including Theodore Roosevelt's military move into Panama in 1903, the Korean War, the Vietnam War, and the invasions of Grenada in 1983 and Panama in 1989.

The amount of military detail handled personally by the president in wartime has varied greatly. George Washington, the first U.S. president, firmly established military subordination under civilian authority. In 1794, Washington used his constitutional powers to assemble 12,000 militia to quell the Whiskey Rebellion, a conflict in Western Pennsylvania involving armed farmers and distillers who refused to pay an excise tax on spirits. According to historian Joseph Ellis, this was the "first and only time a sitting American president led troops in the field", though James Madison briefly took control of artillery units in defense of Washington, D.C., during the War of 1812. Abraham Lincoln was deeply involved in overall strategy and in day-to-day operations during the American Civil War, 1861–1865; historians have given Lincoln high praise for his strategic sense and his ability to select and encourage commanders such as Ulysses S. Grant.

The present-day operational command of the Armed Forces is delegated to the Department of Defense and is normally exercised through the secretary of defense. The chairman of the Joint Chiefs of Staff and the Combatant Commands assist with the operation as outlined in the presidentially approved Unified Command Plan (UCP).

== Judicial powers ==
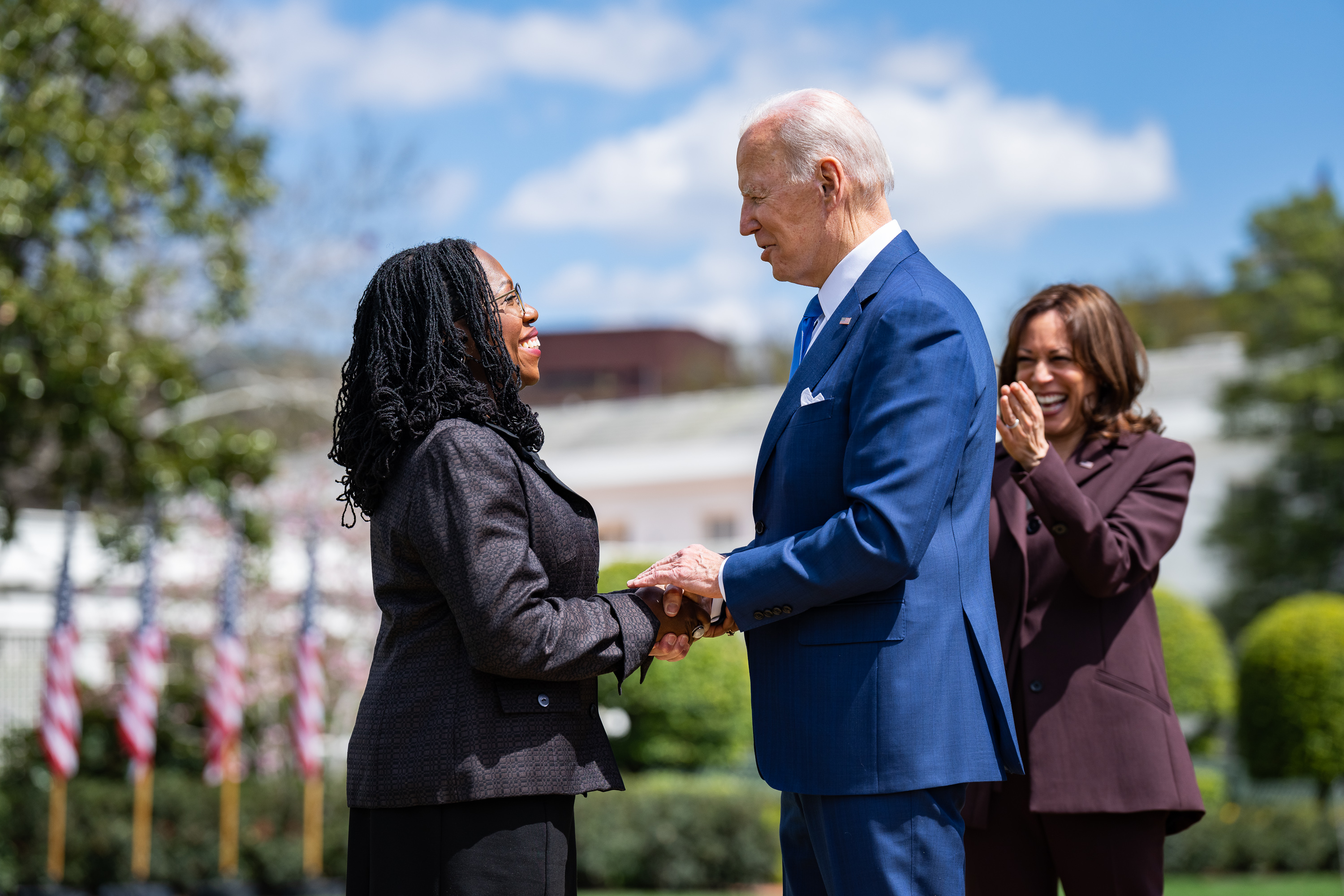
President Joe Biden with his Supreme Court appointee Justice Ketanji Brown Jackson and Vice President Kamala Harris (in background) following Brown Jackson's 2022 United States Senate confirmation

The president has the power to nominate federal judges, including members of the United States courts of appeals and the Supreme Court of the United States. However, these nominations require Senate confirmation before they may take office. Securing Senate approval can provide a major obstacle for presidents who wish to orient the federal judiciary toward a particular ideological stance. When nominating judges to U.S. district courts, presidents often respect the long-standing tradition of senatorial courtesy. Presidents may also grant pardons and reprieves. Gerald Ford pardoned Richard Nixon a month after taking office. Presidents often grant pardons shortly before leaving office, like when Bill Clinton pardoned Patty Hearst on his last day in office; this is often controversial.

Two doctrines concerning executive power have developed that enable the president to exercise executive power with a degree of autonomy. The first is executive privilege, which allows the president to withhold from disclosure any communications made directly to the president in the performance of executive duties. George Washington first claimed the privilege when Congress requested to see Chief Justice John Jay's notes from an unpopular treaty negotiation with Great Britain. While not enshrined in the Constitution or any other law, Washington's action created the precedent for the privilege. When Nixon tried to use executive privilege as a reason for not turning over subpoenaed evidence to Congress during the Watergate scandal, the Supreme Court ruled in United States v. Nixon, that executive privilege did not apply in cases where a president was attempting to avoid criminal prosecution. When Bill Clinton attempted to use executive privilege regarding the Lewinsky scandal, the Supreme Court ruled in Clinton v. Jones, that the privilege also could not be used in civil suits. These cases established the legal precedent that executive privilege is valid, although the exact extent of the privilege has yet to be clearly defined. Additionally, federal courts have allowed this privilege to radiate outward and protect other executive branch employees but have weakened that protection for those executive branch communications that do not involve the president.

The state secrets privilege allows the president and the executive branch to withhold information or documents from discovery in legal proceedings if such release would harm national security. Precedent for the privilege arose early in the 19th century when Thomas Jefferson refused to release military documents in the treason trial of Aaron Burr and again in Totten v. United States, when the Supreme Court dismissed a case brought by a former Union spy. However, the privilege was not formally recognized by the U.S. Supreme Court until United States v. Reynolds, where it was held to be a common law evidentiary privilege. Before the September 11 attacks, use of the privilege had been rare, but increasing in frequency. Since 2001, the government has asserted the privilege in more cases and at earlier stages of the litigation, thus in some instances causing dismissal of the suits before reaching the merits of the claims, as in the Ninth Circuit's ruling in Mohamed v. Jeppesen Dataplan, Inc. Critics of the privilege claim its use has become a tool for the government to cover up illegal or embarrassing government actions.

The degree to which the president personally has absolute immunity from court cases is contested and has been the subject of several Supreme Court decisions. Nixon v. Fitzgerald (1982) dismissed a civil lawsuit against by-then former president Richard Nixon based on his official actions. Clinton v. Jones (1997) decided that a president has no immunity against civil suits for actions taken before becoming president and ruled that a sexual harassment suit could proceed without delay, even against a sitting president. The 2019 Mueller report on Russian interference in the 2016 presidential election detailed evidence of possible obstruction of justice, but investigators declined to refer Donald Trump for prosecution based on a United States Department of Justice policy against indicting an incumbent president. The report noted that impeachment by Congress was available as a remedy. As of October 2019, a case was pending in the federal courts regarding access to personal tax returns in a criminal case brought against Donald Trump by the New York County District Attorney alleging violations of New York state law.

Memoranda from the Office of Legal Counsel issued in 1973 and 2000 internally prohibit the Department of Justice from prosecuting a president, which some legal scholars have criticized but others have endorsed.

In defense against federal criminal prosecution for his alleged 2020 election subversion, in January 2024, Trump argued to the DC Circuit Court of Appeals that a president enjoys absolute immunity for criminal acts conducted while in office. The next month, a three-judge panel of the court unanimously ruled against Trump. It was the first time an appeals court had addressed such a presidential immunity matter, since no other sitting or former president had ever been criminally indicted.

In Trump v. United States, on July 1, 2024, the Supreme Court ruled that presidents were entitled to absolute immunity from exercising core powers enumerated by the Constitution, presumption of immunity for other official acts, and no immunity for unofficial actions. The case was sent back to lower courts to determine which actions in the criminal complaint should be classified as official vs. unofficial. The ruling was the first time the courts granted a president criminal immunity.

== Leadership roles ==
=== Head of state ===
Four ruffles and flourishes and 'Hail to the Chief' (long version)

As head of state, the president represents the United States government to its own people and represents the nation to the rest of the world. For example, during a state visit by a foreign head of state, the president typically hosts a State Arrival Ceremony held on the South Lawn, a custom begun by John F. Kennedy in 1961. This is followed by a state dinner given by the president which is held in the State Dining Room later in the evening.

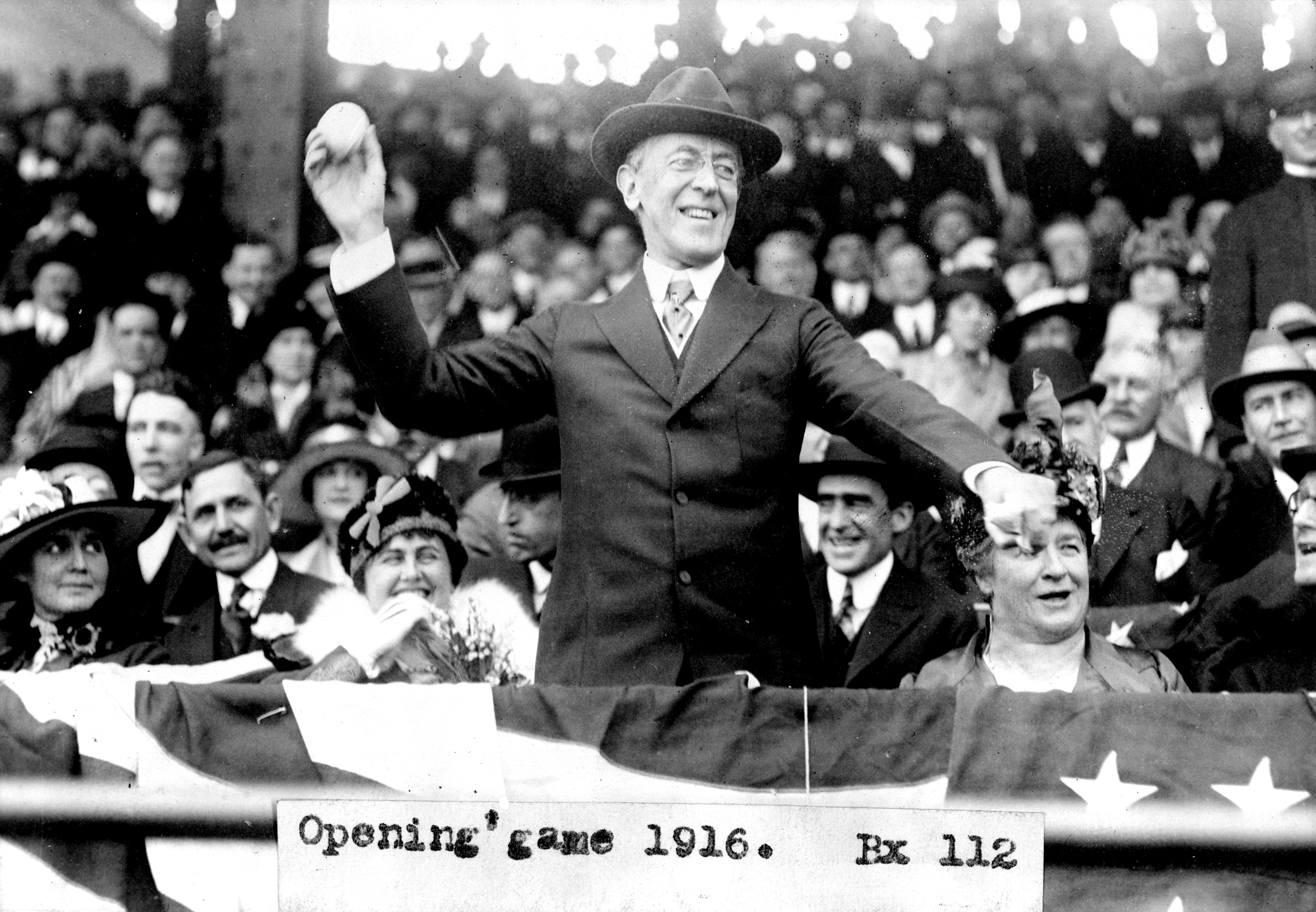
President Woodrow Wilson throws out the ceremonial first ball on Opening Day in 1916

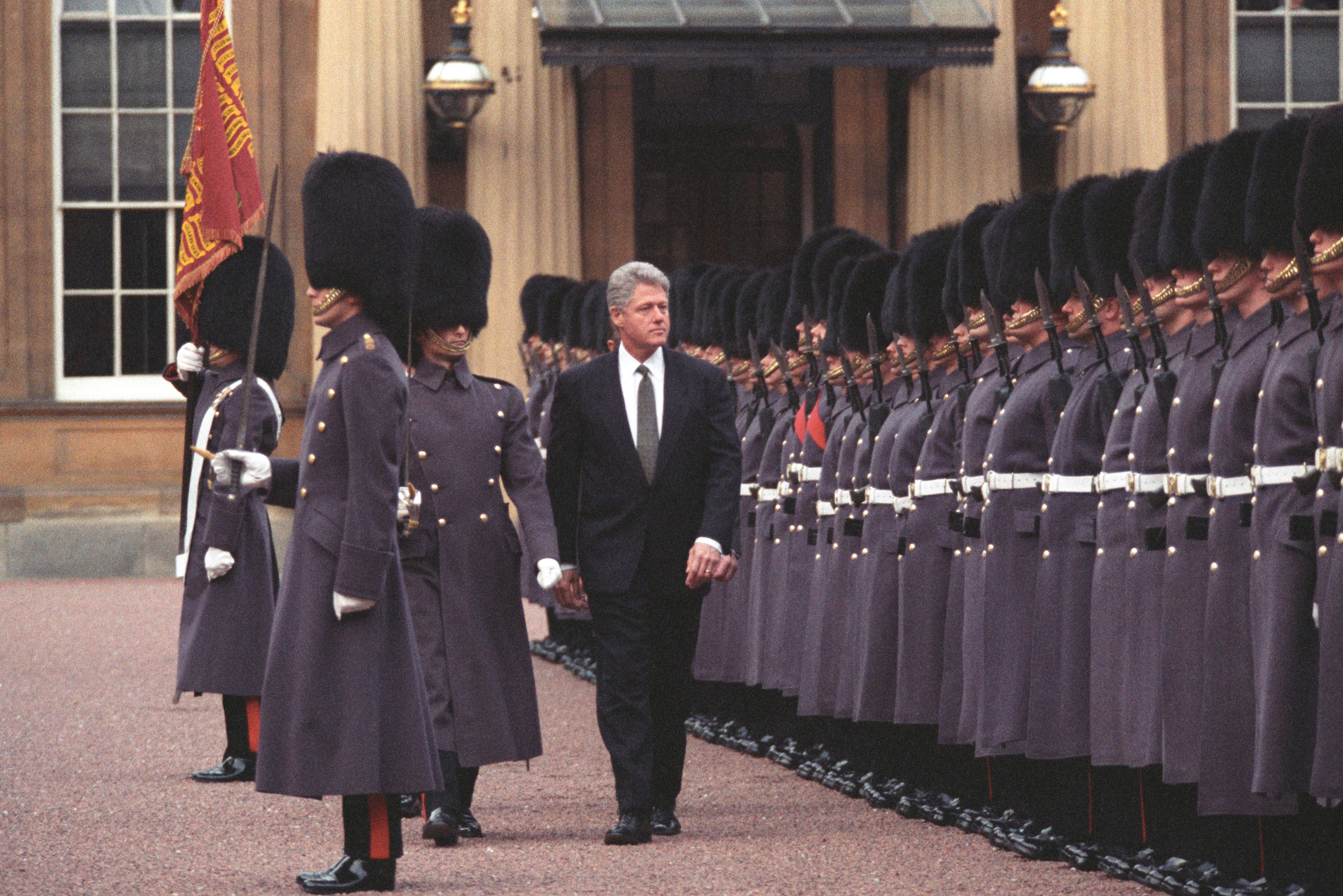
President Bill Clinton reviews honor guards at Buckingham Palace during a 1995 state visit to the UK

As a national leader, the president also fulfills many less formal ceremonial duties. For example, William Howard Taft started the tradition of throwing out the ceremonial first pitch in 1910 at Griffith Stadium, Washington, D.C., on the Washington Senators's Opening Day. Every president since Taft, except for Jimmy Carter, threw out at least one ceremonial first ball or pitch for Opening Day, the All-Star Game, or the World Series, usually with much fanfare. Every president since Theodore Roosevelt has served as honorary president of the Boy Scouts of America.

Other presidential traditions are associated with American holidays. Rutherford B. Hayes began in 1878 the first White House egg rolling for local children. Beginning in 1947, during the Harry S. Truman administration, every Thanksgiving the president is presented with a live domestic turkey during the annual National Thanksgiving Turkey Presentation held at the White House. Since 1989, when the custom of "pardoning" the turkey was formalized by George H. W. Bush, the turkey has been taken to a farm where it will live out the rest of its natural life.

Presidential traditions also involve the president's role as head of government. Many outgoing presidents since James Buchanan traditionally give advice to their successor during the presidential transition. Ronald Reagan and his successors have also left a private message on the desk of the Oval Office on Inauguration Day for the incoming president.

The modern presidency holds the president as one of the nation's premier celebrities. Some argue that images of the presidency have a tendency to be manipulated by administration public relations officials and by presidents themselves. One critic described the presidency as "propagandized leadership" which has a "mesmerizing power surrounding the office". Administration public relations managers staged carefully crafted photo-ops of smiling presidents with smiling crowds for television cameras.

One critic described the public image of John F. Kennedy as being carefully framed "in rich detail" which "drew on the power of myth" regarding the incident of PT 109, and wrote that Kennedy understood how to use images to further his presidential ambitions. As a result, some political commentators have opined that American voters have unrealistic expectations of presidents: voters expect a president to "drive the economy, vanquish enemies, lead the free world, comfort tornado victims, heal the national soul and protect borrowers from hidden credit-card fees".

=== Head of party ===
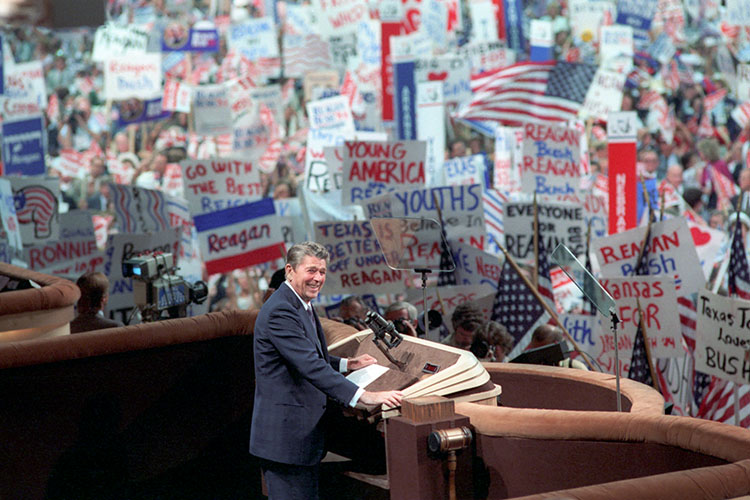
President Ronald Reagan giving his acceptance speech at the 1984 Republican National Convention.

The president is typically considered to be the de facto head and spokesperson of their political party. With the advent of binding primaries in most states, presidential nominees typically enjoy the support of a majority or plurality of their party's voters. Since the entire House of Representatives and at least one-third of the Senate is elected simultaneously with the president, candidates from a political party frequently have their electoral success intertwined with the performance of the party's presidential candidate.

The coattail effect, or lack thereof, will also often impact a party's candidates at state and local levels of government as well. However, there are often tensions between a president and others in the party, with presidents who lose significant support from their party's caucus in Congress generally viewed to be weaker and less effective. Also, because the United States is not a parliamentary system, presidents' parties do not necessarily enjoy majorities in one or more houses of Congress, nor in the governorships or state legislatures of many states.

=== Global leader ===
With the rise of the United States as a superpower in the 20th century, and the United States having the world's largest economy into the 21st century, the president is typically viewed as a global leader, and at times the world's most powerful political figure. The position of the United States as the leading member of NATO, and the country's strong relationships with other wealthy or democratic nations like those comprising the European Union, have led to the moniker that the president is the "leader of the free world".

== Selection process ==
=== Eligibility ===
Article II, Section 1, Clause 5 of the Constitution sets three qualifications for holding the presidency. To serve as president, one must:

- be a natural-born citizen of the United States;
- be at least 35 years old;
- be a resident in the United States for at least 14 years.

A person who meets the above qualifications would still be disqualified from holding the office of president under any of the following conditions:

- Under Article I, Section 3, Clause 7, having been impeached, convicted and disqualified from holding further public office, although there is some legal debate as to whether the disqualification clause also includes the presidential office: the only previous persons disqualified under this clause were three federal judges.
- Under Section 3 of the Fourteenth Amendment, no person who swore an oath to support the Constitution, and later rebelled against the United States, is eligible to hold any office. However, this disqualification can be lifted by a two-thirds vote of each house of Congress. There is, again, some debate as to whether the clause as written allows disqualification from the presidential position, or whether it would first require litigation outside of Congress, although there is precedent for use of this amendment outside of the original intended purpose of excluding Confederates from public office after the Civil War.
- Under the Twenty-second Amendment, no person can be elected president more than twice. The amendment also specifies that if any eligible person serves as president or acting president for more than two years of a term for which some other eligible person was elected president, the former can only be elected president once.

=== Prior experience ===
There are no requirements for previous or concurrent offices held by the president or presidential candidates. However, every president except Donald Trump has been a governor, U.S. senator or Congressman, general or cabinet member.

The most common previous profession of presidents is lawyer, applying to 27 of the 45 men who have served as president. Several future presidents abandoned the study or practice of law prior to the presidency. There has never been a property qualification for the presidency or other federal offices, but, in the early years of the republic, there were property qualifications for voting or for some of the stepping-stone offices to the presidency, particularly governorships. Prior to the Civil War, it was common for presidents to be men of significant property: Presidents from the North tended to own small farms, while several Southern presidents owned plantations and slaves. While several later presidents came from abject poverty, others, such as the Roosevelts, John Kennedy, and Donald Trump, were parties to extensive family fortunes.

33 of the 45 men who served as president, including every president since 1953 and all but one since 1901, have had a bachelor's degree. Of those, 16 presidents received a Bachelor's or advanced degree from colleges in the Ivy League.

=== Campaigns and nomination ===
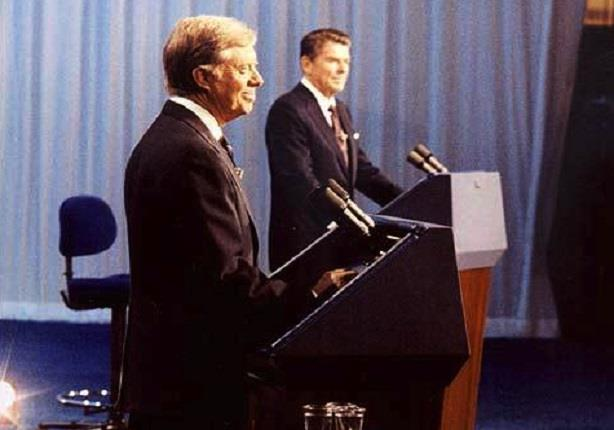
President Jimmy Carter (left) debates Republican nominee Ronald Reagan on October 28, 1980, during the 1980 U.S. presidential campaign

The modern presidential campaign begins before the primary elections, which the two major political parties use to clear the field of candidates before their national nominating conventions, where the most successful candidate is made the party's presidential nominee. Typically, the party's presidential candidate chooses a vice presidential nominee, and this choice is rubber-stamped by the convention.

Nominees participate in nationally televised debates, and while the debates are usually restricted to the Democratic and Republican nominees, third party candidates may be invited, such as Ross Perot in the 1992 debates. Nominees campaign across the country to explain their views, convince voters and solicit contributions. Much of the modern electoral process is concerned with winning swing states through frequent visits and mass media advertising drives.

=== Election ===
A map of the United States showing the number of electoral votes allocated following the 2020 United States census to each state and the District of Columbia for the 2024 and 2028 presidential elections. 270 electoral votes are required for a majority out of 538 votes possible

The president is elected indirectly by the voters of each state and the District of Columbia through the Electoral College, a body of electors formed every four years for the sole purpose of electing the president and vice president to concurrent four-year terms. As prescribed by Article II, Section 1, Clause 2, each state is entitled to a number of electors equal to the size of its total delegation in both houses of Congress. The Twenty-third Amendment provides that the District of Columbia is entitled to the number it would have if it were a state, but in no case more than that of the least populous state.

Currently, all states and the District of Columbia select their electors based on a popular election. In all but two states, the party whose presidential–vice presidential ticket receives a plurality of popular votes in the state has its entire slate of elector nominees chosen as the state's electors. Maine and Nebraska deviate from this winner-take-all practice, awarding two electors to the statewide winner and one to the winner in each congressional district.

On the first Monday after the second Wednesday in December, about six weeks after the election, the electors convene in their respective state capitals, and in Washington, D.C., to vote for president and, on a separate ballot, for vice president. They typically vote for the candidates of the party that nominated them. While there is no constitutional mandate or federal law requiring them to do so, the District of Columbia and 32 states have laws requiring that their electors vote for the candidates to whom they are pledged. The constitutionality of these laws was upheld in Chiafalo v. Washington (2020).

Following the vote, each state then sends a certified record of their electoral votes to Congress. The votes of the electors are opened and counted during a joint session of Congress, held in the first week of January. If a candidate has received an absolute majority of electoral votes for president, currently 270 of 538, that person is declared the winner. Otherwise, the House of Representatives must meet to elect a president using a contingent election procedure in which representatives, voting by state delegation, with each state casting a single vote, choose between the top three electoral vote-getters for president. To win the presidency, a candidate must receive the votes of an absolute majority of states, currently 26 of 50.

There have been two contingent presidential elections in the nation's history. A 73–73 electoral vote tie between Thomas Jefferson and fellow Democratic-Republican Aaron Burr in the election of 1800 necessitated the first. Conducted under the original procedure established by Article II, Section 1, Clause 3 of the Constitution, which stipulates that if two or three persons received a majority vote and an equal vote, the House of Representatives would choose one of them for president; the runner-up would become vice president. On February 17, 1801, Jefferson was elected president on the 36th ballot, and Burr elected vice president. Afterward, the system was overhauled through the Twelfth Amendment in time to be used in the 1804 election.

A quarter-century later, the choice for president again devolved to the House when no candidate won an absolute majority of electoral votes, 131 of 261, in the election of 1824. Under the Twelfth Amendment, the House was required to choose a president from among the top three electoral vote recipients: Andrew Jackson, John Quincy Adams, and William H. Crawford. Held February 9, 1825, this second and most recent contingent election resulted in John Quincy Adams being elected president on the first ballot.

=== Inauguration ===
Pursuant to the Twentieth Amendment, the four-year term of office for both the president and the vice president begins at noon on January 20, in the year following the preceding presidential election. The first presidential and vice presidential terms to begin on this date, known as Inauguration Day, were the second terms of President Franklin D. Roosevelt and Vice President John Nance Garner in 1937. Previously, Inauguration Day was on March 4. As a result of the date change, the first term (1933–37) of both men had been shortened by 43 days.

Before executing the powers of the office, a president is required to recite the presidential Oath of Office, found in Article II, Section 1, Clause 8 of the Constitution. This is the only component in the inauguration ceremony mandated by the Constitution:

I do solemnly swear (or affirm) that I will faithfully execute the Office of President of the United States, and will to the best of my ability, preserve, protect, and defend the Constitution of the United States.

Presidents have traditionally placed one hand upon a Bible while taking the oath, and have added "So help me God" to the end of the oath. Although the oath may be administered by any person authorized by law to administer oaths, presidents are traditionally sworn in by the chief justice of the United States.

== Incumbency ==
=== Term limit ===
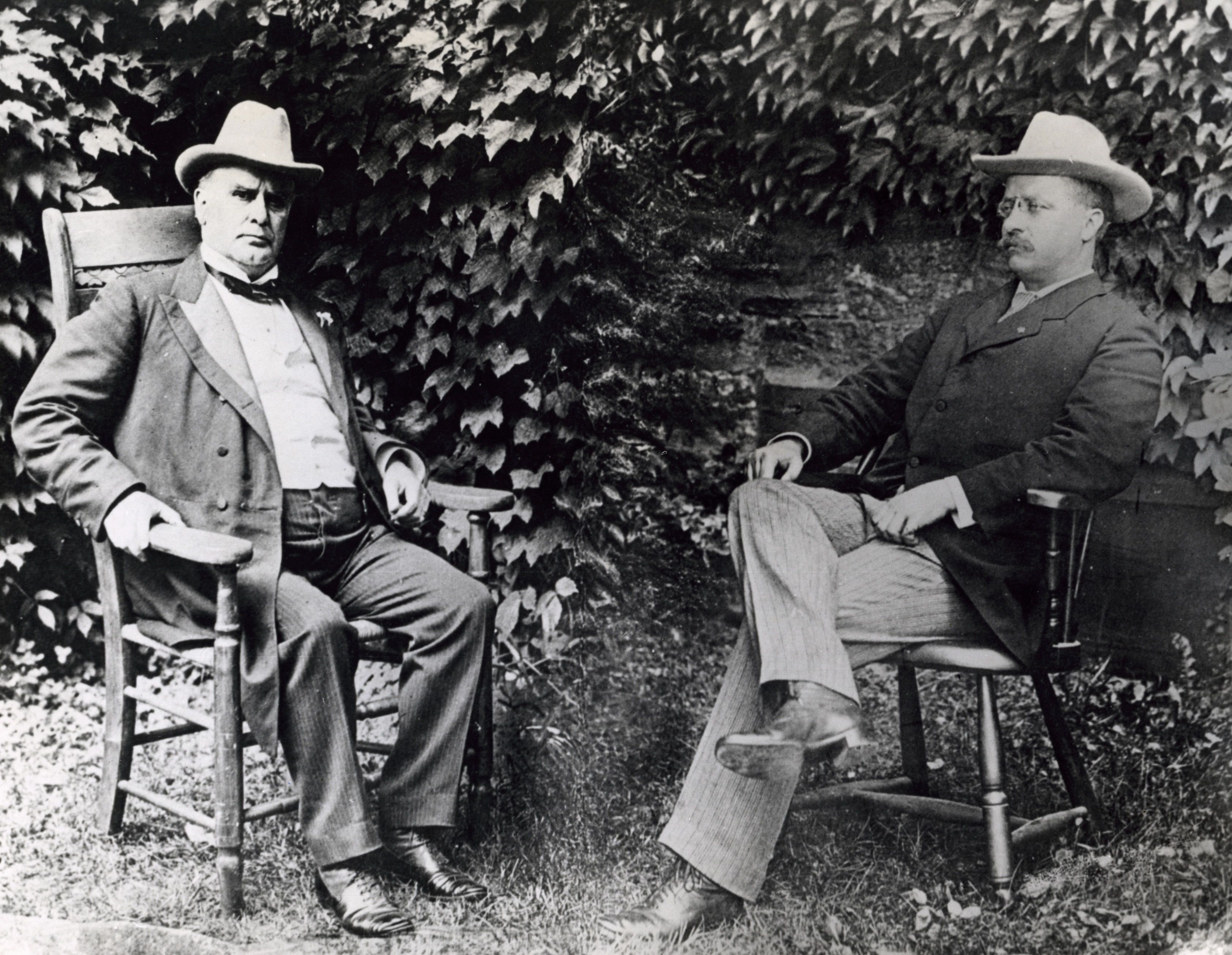
President William McKinley and his vice presidential running mate, New York governor Theodore Roosevelt, c. 1900

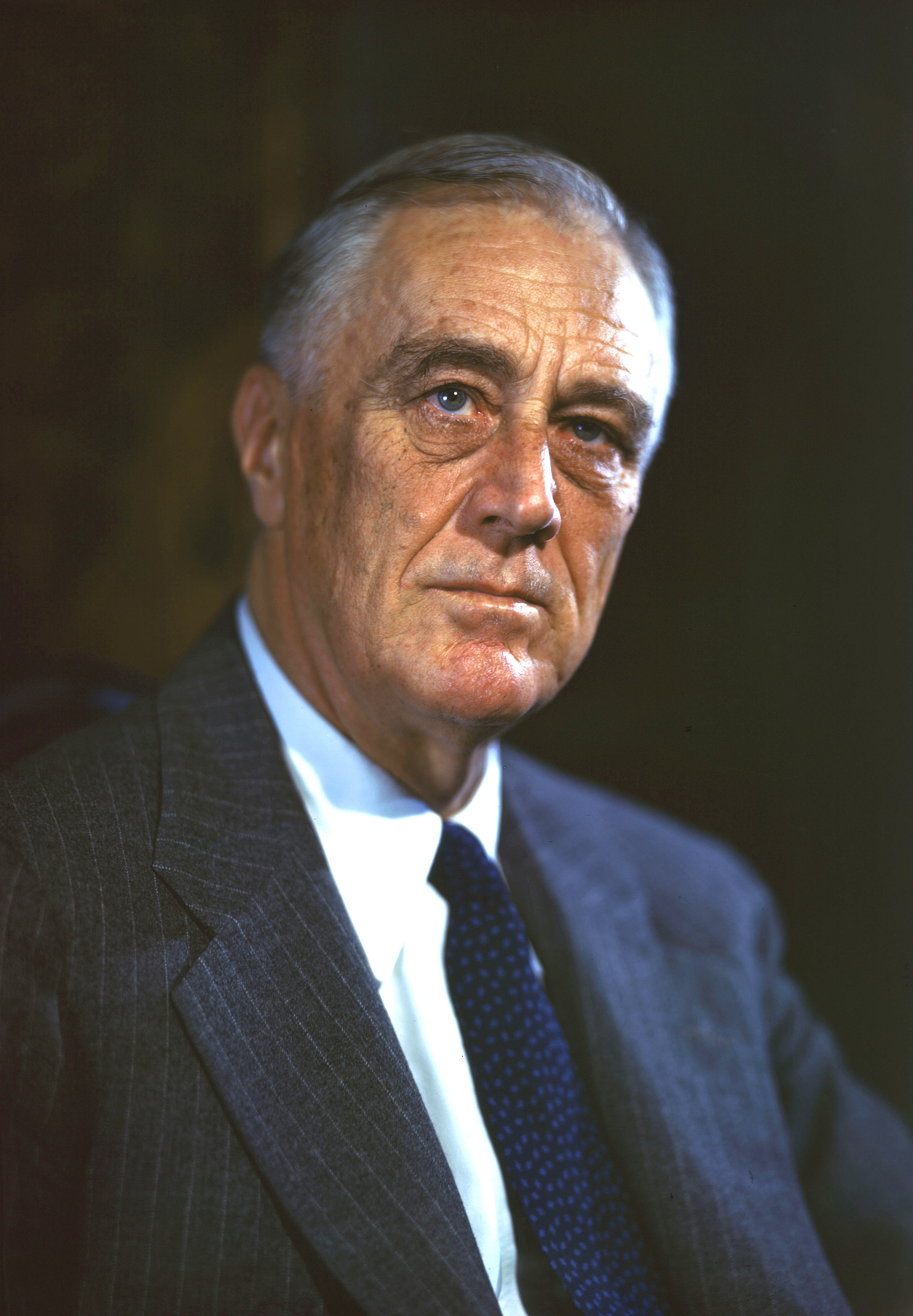
Franklin D. Roosevelt won a record four presidential elections in 1932, 1936, 1940, and 1944 prior to the implementation of the 22nd amendment in 1951, which instituted a two-term limit.

When the first president, George Washington, announced in his Farewell Address that he was not running for a third term, he established a "two terms then out" precedent. Precedent became tradition after Thomas Jefferson publicly embraced the principle a decade later during his second term, as did his two immediate successors, James Madison and James Monroe. In spite of the strong two-term tradition, Ulysses S. Grant sought nomination at the 1880 Republican National Convention for a non-consecutive third term, but was unsuccessful.

In 1940, after leading the nation through the Great Depression and focused on supporting U.S. allied nations at war with the Axis powers, Franklin Roosevelt was elected to a third term, breaking the long-standing precedent. Four years later, with the U.S. engaged in World War II, he was re-elected again despite his declining physical health; he died 82 days into his fourth term on April 12, 1945.

In response to the unprecedented length of Roosevelt's presidency, the Twenty-second Amendment was adopted in 1951. The amendment bars anyone from being elected president more than twice, or once if that person served more than two years (24 months) of another president's four-year term. Harry S. Truman, the president at the time it was submitted to the states by the Congress, was exempted from its limitations. Without the exemption, he would not have been eligible to run for a second full term in 1952, which he briefly sought, as he had served nearly all of Franklin Roosevelt's unexpired 1945–1949 term and had been elected to a full four-year term beginning in 1949.

=== Vacancies and succession ===
Under Section 1 of the Twenty-fifth Amendment, ratified in 1967, the vice president becomes president upon the removal from office, death, or resignation of the president. Deaths have occurred a number of times, resignation has occurred only once, and removal from office has never occurred.

Before the ratification of the Twenty-fifth amendment (which clarified the matter of succession), Article II, Section 1, Clause 6, stated only that the vice president assumes the "powers and duties" of the presidency in the event of a president's removal, death, resignation, or inability. Under this clause, there was ambiguity about whether the vice president would actually become president in the event of a vacancy, or simply act as president, potentially resulting in a special election. Upon the death of President William Henry Harrison in 1841, Vice President John Tyler declared that he had succeeded to the office itself, refusing to accept any papers addressed to the "Acting President", and Congress ultimately accepted it.

In the event of a double vacancy, Article II, Section 1, Clause 6 also authorizes Congress to declare who shall become acting president in the "Case of Removal, Death, Resignation or Inability, both of the president and vice president". The Presidential Succession Act of 1947 (codified as 3 U.S.C. § 19) provides that if both the president and vice president have left office or are both otherwise unavailable to serve during their terms of office, the presidential line of succession follows the order of: speaker of the House, then, if necessary, the president pro tempore of the Senate, and then if necessary, the eligible heads of federal executive departments who form the president's cabinet.

The cabinet currently has 15 members, of which the secretary of state is first in line. The other Cabinet secretaries follow in the order in which their department, or the department of which their department is the successor, was created. Those individuals who are constitutionally ineligible to be elected to the presidency are also disqualified from assuming the powers and duties of the presidency through succession. No statutory successor has yet been called upon to act as president.

=== Declarations of inability ===
Under the Twenty-fifth Amendment, the president may temporarily transfer the presidential powers and duties to the vice president, who then becomes acting president, by transmitting to the speaker of the House and the president pro tempore of the Senate a statement that he is unable to discharge his duties. The president resumes his or her powers upon transmitting a second declaration stating that he is again able. The mechanism has been used by Ronald Reagan (once), George W. Bush (twice), and Joe Biden (once), each in anticipation of surgery.

The Twenty-fifth Amendment also provides that the vice president, together with a majority of certain members of the Cabinet, may transfer the presidential powers and duties to the vice president by transmitting a written declaration, to the speaker of the House and the president pro tempore of the Senate, to the effect that the president is unable to discharge his or her powers and duties. If the president then declares that no such inability exist, he or she resumes the presidential powers unless the vice president and Cabinet make a second declaration of presidential inability, in which case Congress decides the question. Removing the president's powers requires a two-thirds majority in both houses of Congress.

=== Removal ===
Article II, Section 4 of the Constitution allows for the removal of high federal officials, including the president, from office for "treason, bribery, or other high crimes and misdemeanors". Article I, Section 2, Clause 5 authorizes the House of Representatives to serve as a "grand jury" with the power to impeach said officials by a majority vote. Article I, Section 3, Clause 6 authorizes the Senate to serve as a court with the power to remove impeached officials from office, by a two-thirds vote to convict.

Three presidents have been impeached by the House of Representatives: Andrew Johnson in 1868, Bill Clinton in 1998, and Donald Trump in 2019 and 2021. None have been convicted by the Senate. The House Judiciary Committee conducted an impeachment inquiry against Richard Nixon in 1973–74 and reported three articles of impeachment to the House of Representatives for final action. He resigned from office before the House voted on them.

=== Circumvention of authority ===
Controversial measures have sometimes been taken short of removal to deal with perceived recklessness on the part of the president, or with a long-term disability. In some cases, staff have intentionally failed to deliver messages to or from the president, typically to avoid executing or promoting the president to write certain orders. This has ranged from Richard Nixon's Chief of Staff not transmitting orders to the Cabinet due to the president's heavy drinking, to staff removing memos from Donald Trump's desk. Decades before the Twenty-fifth Amendment, in 1919, President Woodrow Wilson had a stroke that left him partly incapacitated. First lady Edith Wilson kept this condition a secret from the public for a while, and controversially became the sole gatekeeper for access to the president (aside from his doctor), assisting him with paperwork and deciding which information was "important" enough to share with him.

=== Compensation ===
Presidential pay history
Year established	Salary	Salary in 2025 USD
1789	$25,000	$675,604
1873	$50,000	$1,343,750
1909	$75,000	$2,687,500
1949	$100,000	$1,353,147
1969	$200,000	$1,755,898
2001	$400,000	$727,307

Since 2001, the president's annual salary has been $400,000, along with a $50,000 expense allowance; a $100,000 nontaxable travel account; and a $19,000 entertainment account. The president's salary is set by Congress, and under Article II, Section 1, Clause 7 of the Constitution, any increase or reduction in presidential salary cannot take effect before the next presidential term of office.

=== Residence ===
The Executive Residence of the White House in Washington, D.C., is the official residence of the president. The site was selected by George Washington, and the cornerstone was laid in 1792. Every president since John Adams in 1800 has lived there. At various times in U.S. history, it has been known as the "President's Palace", the "President's House", and the "Executive Mansion". Theodore Roosevelt officially gave the White House its current name in 1901. The federal government pays for state dinners and other official functions, but the president pays for personal, family, and guest dry cleaning and food.

Camp David, officially titled Naval Support Facility Thurmont, a mountain-based military camp in Frederick County, Maryland, is the president's country residence. A place of solitude and tranquility, the site has been used extensively to host foreign dignitaries since the 1940s.

The President's Guest House, located next to the Eisenhower Executive Office Building at the White House Complex and Lafayette Park, serves as the president's official guest house and as a secondary residence for the president if needed. Four interconnected, 19th-century houses—Blair House, Lee House, and 700 and 704 Jackson Place—with a combined floor space exceeding 70,000 square feet (6,500 m^{2}) constitute the property.

Presidential residences

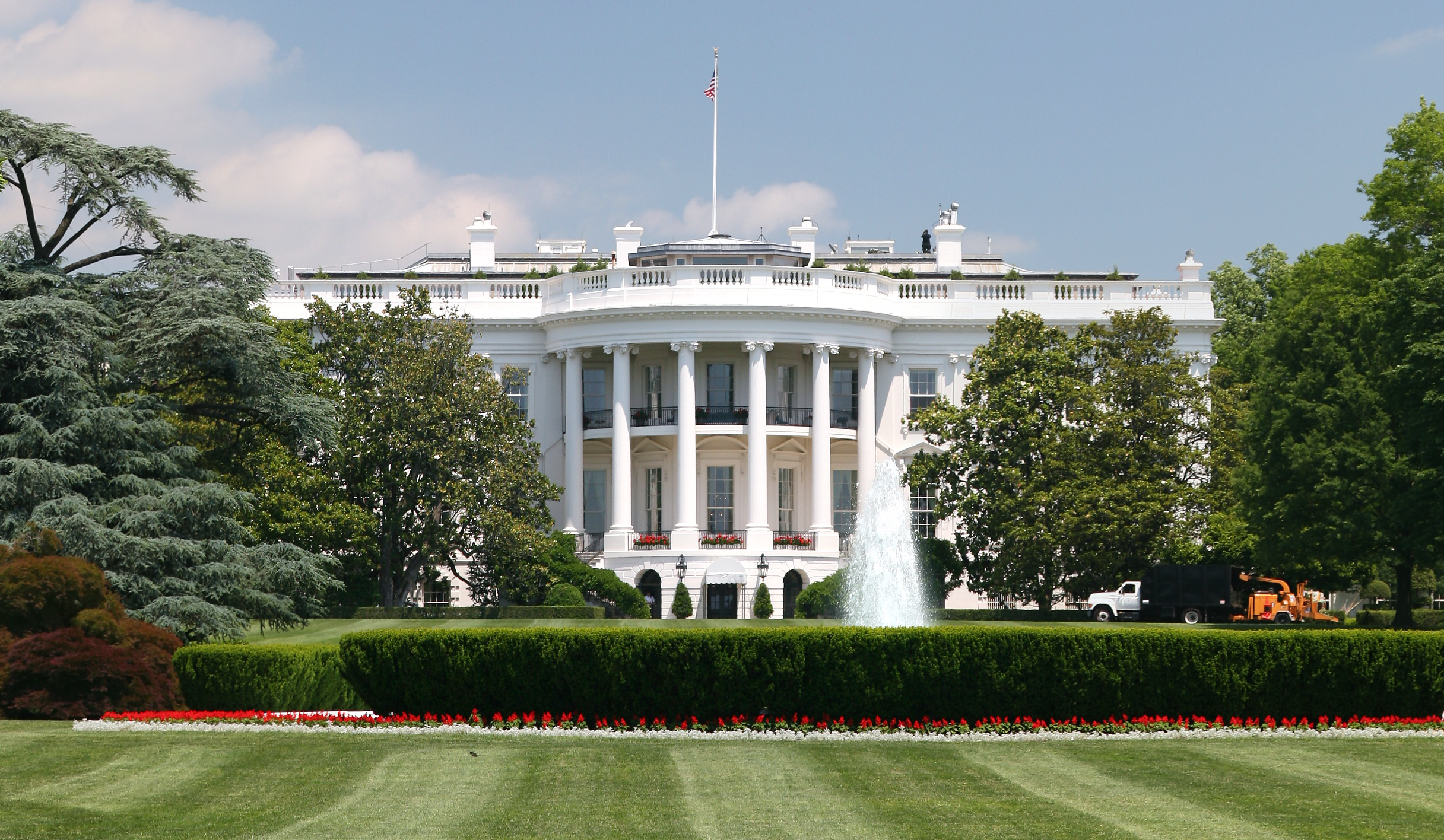
White House, the official residence

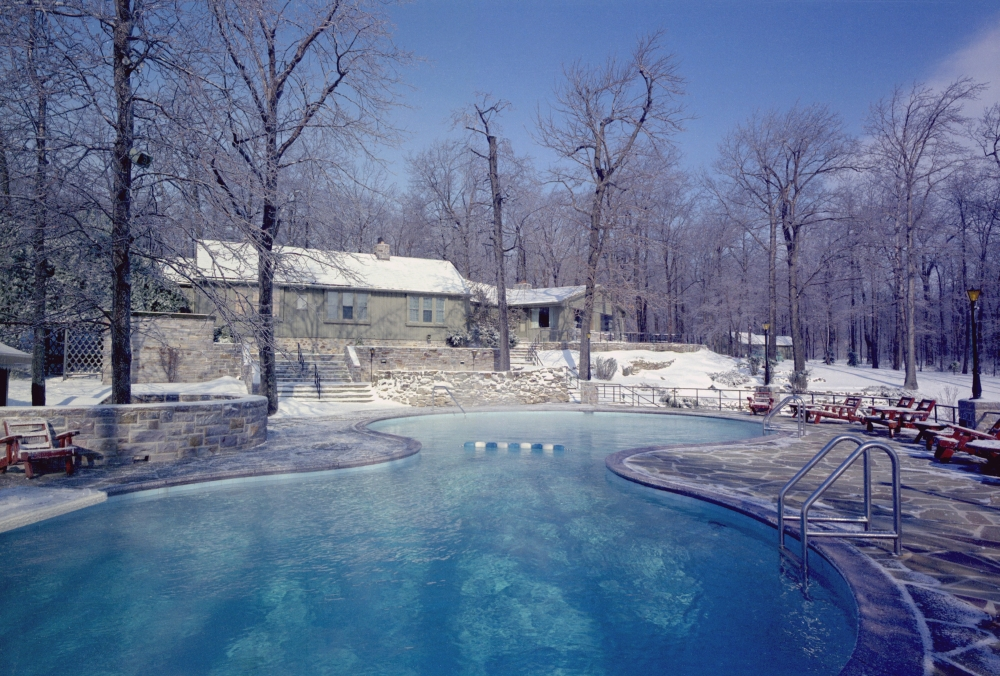
Camp David in Frederick County, Maryland, the official retreat

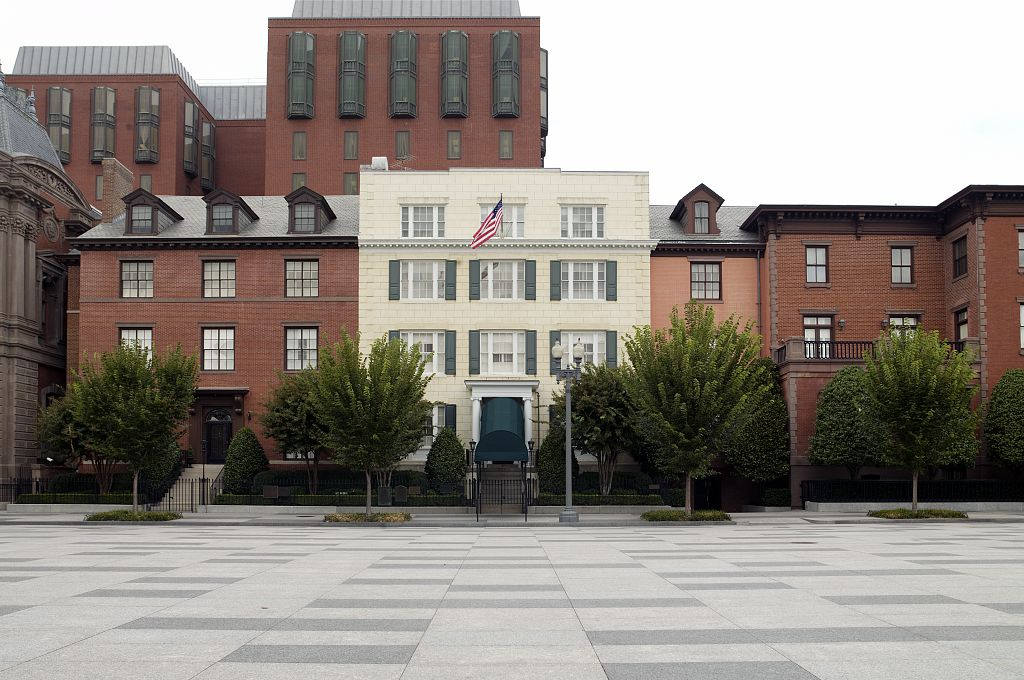
Blair House, the official guest house

=== Travel ===
The primary means of long-distance air travel for the president is one of two identical Boeing VC-25 aircraft, which are extensively modified Boeing 747 airliners and are referred to as Air Force One while the president is on board. Any U.S. Air Force aircraft the president is aboard is designated as "Air Force One" for the duration of the flight. In-country trips are typically handled with just one of the two planes, while overseas trips are handled with both, one primary and one backup. The president has access to smaller Air Force aircraft, most notably the Boeing C-32, which are used when the president must travel to airports that cannot support a jumbo jet. Any civilian aircraft the president is aboard is designated Executive One for the flight.

For short-distance air travel, the president has access to a fleet of U.S. Marine Corps helicopters of varying models, designated Marine One when the president is aboard any particular one in the fleet. Flights are typically handled with as many as five helicopters all flying together and frequently swapping positions as to disguise which helicopter the president is actually aboard to any would-be threats.

For ground travel, the president uses the presidential state car, which is an armored limousine designed to look like a Cadillac sedan, but built on a truck chassis. The U.S. Secret Service operates and maintains the fleet of several limousines. The president also has access to two armored motorcoaches, which are primarily used for touring trips.

Presidential transportation

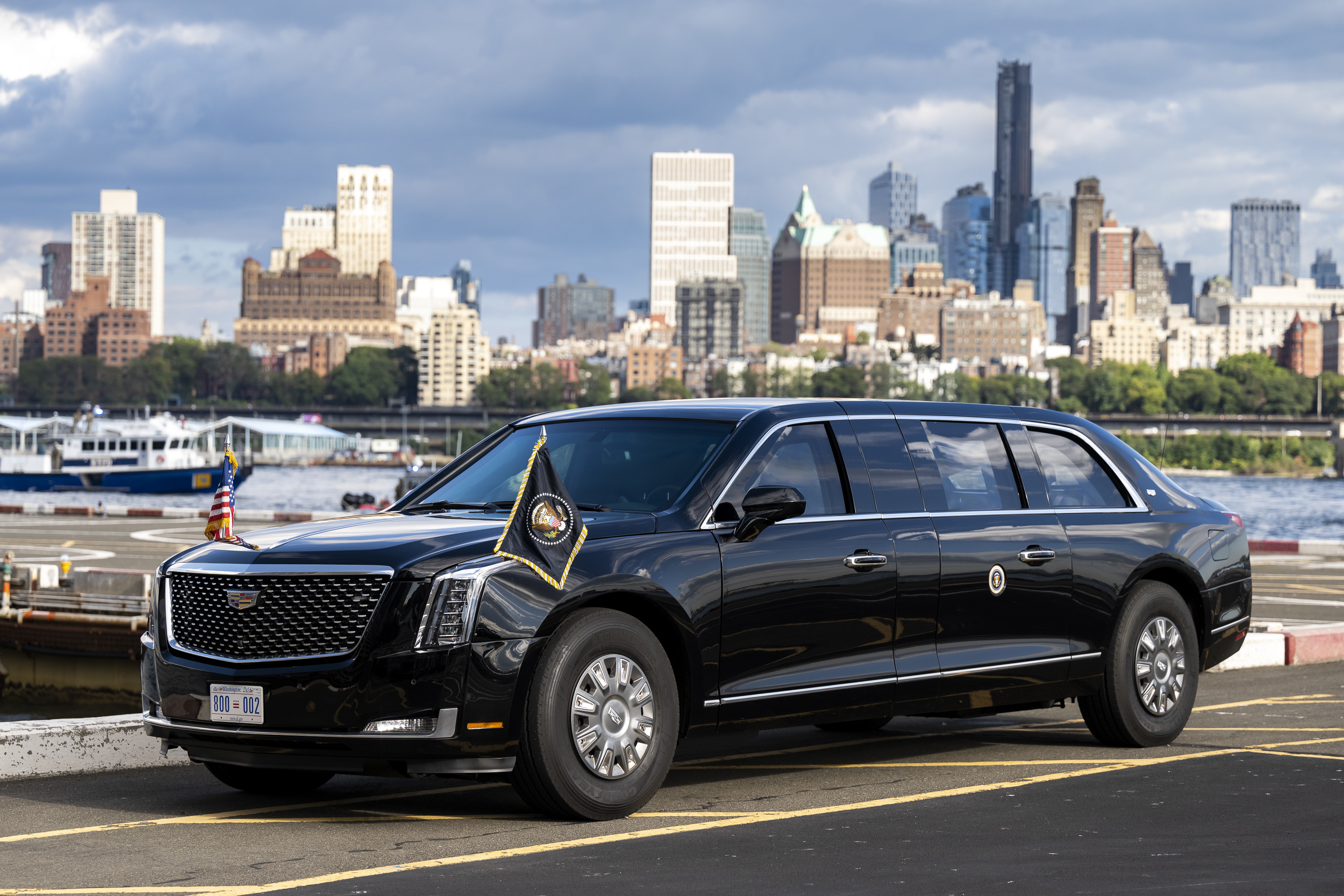
The presidential limousine, dubbed "The Beast"

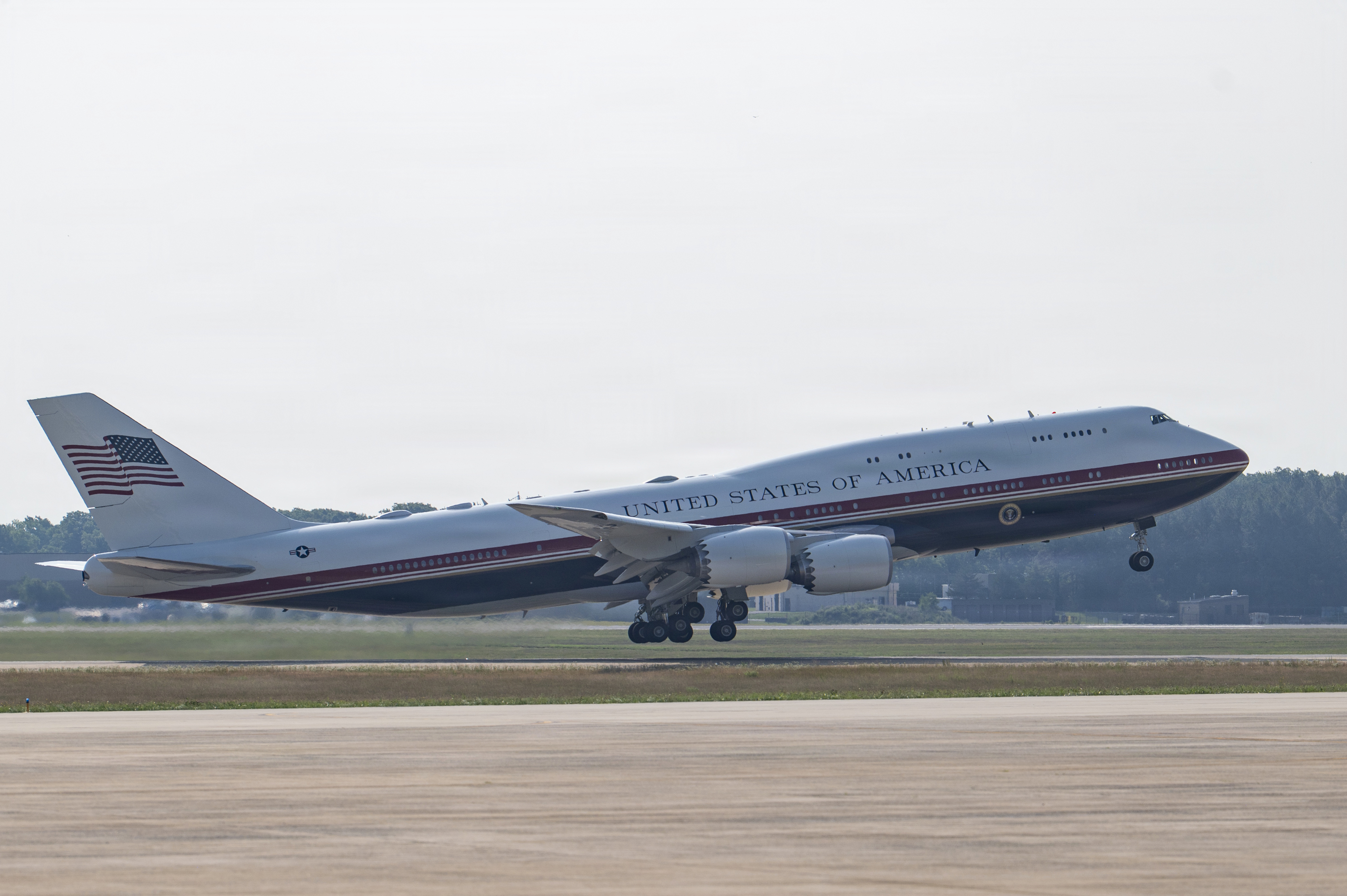
The presidential plane, called Air Force One when the president is on board

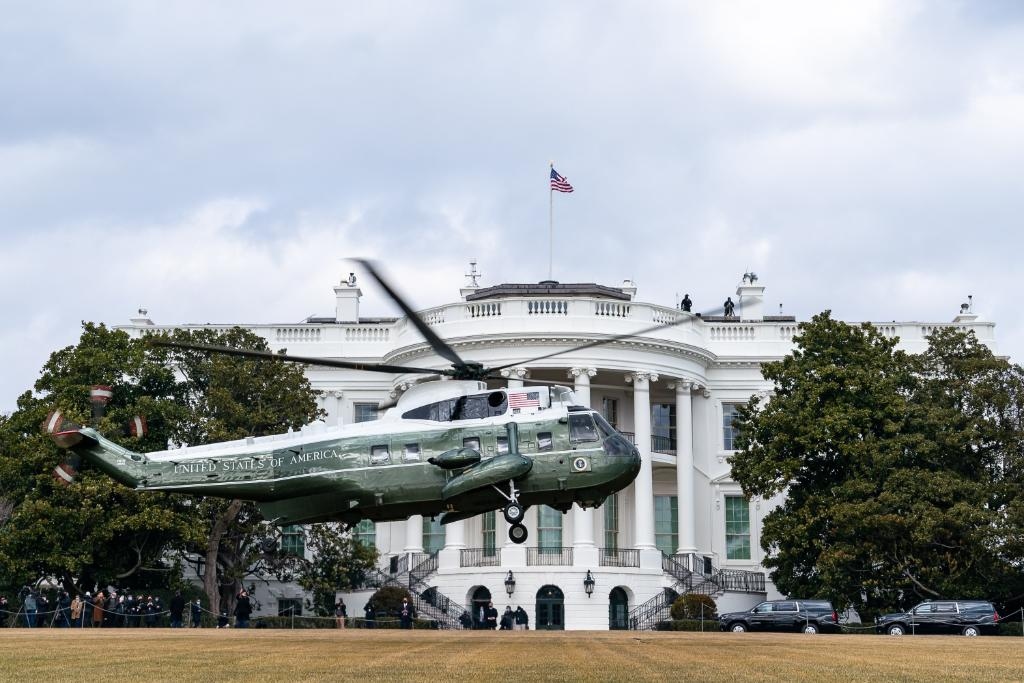
The presidential helicopter, known as Marine One when the president is aboard

=== Protection ===
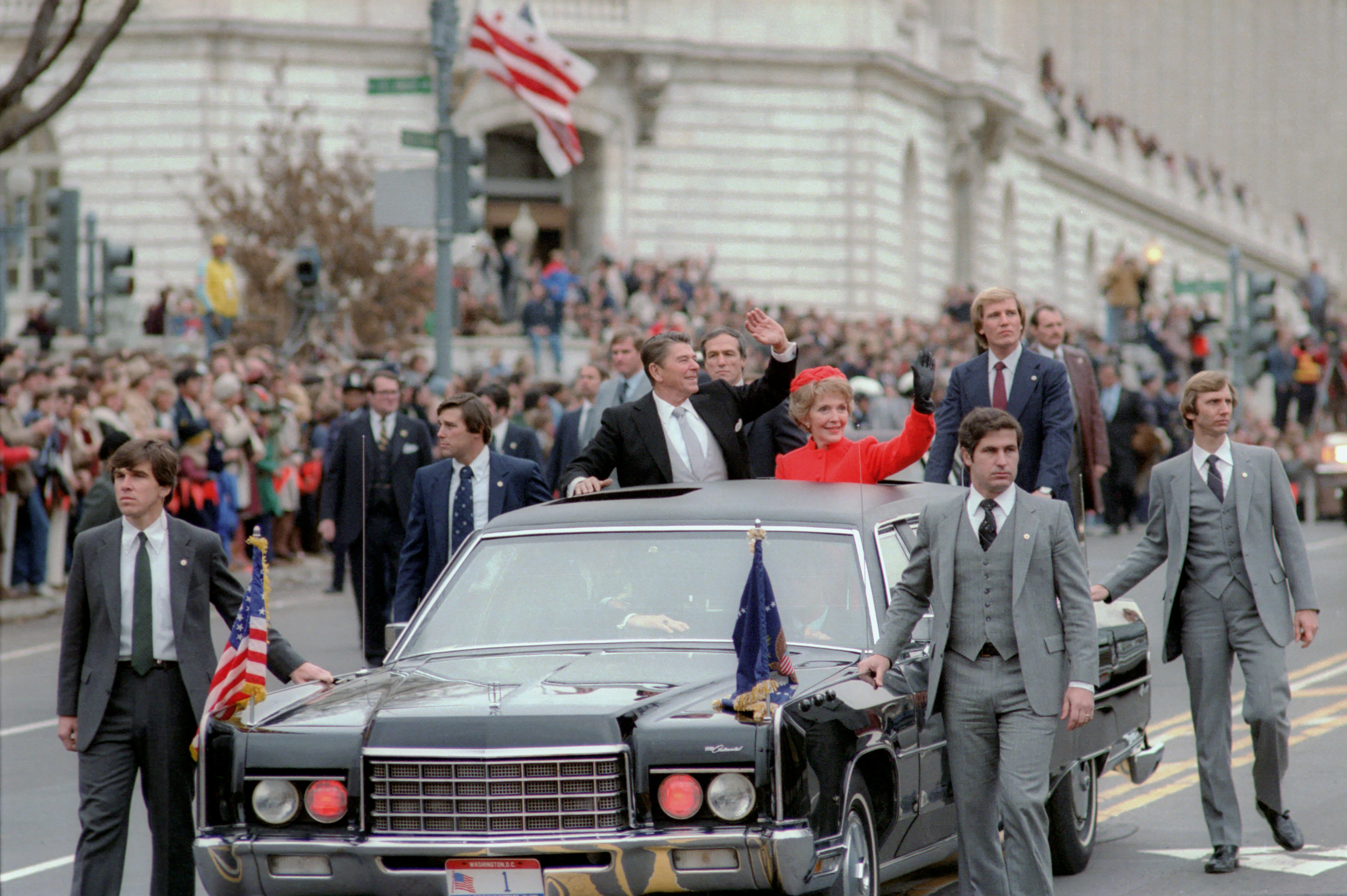
President Ronald Reagan waves following his inauguration as the nation's 40th president on January 20, 1981

The U.S. Secret Service is charged with protecting the president and the first family. As part of their protection, presidents, first ladies, their children and other immediate family members, and other prominent persons and locations are assigned Secret Service codenames. The use of such names was originally for security purposes and dates to a time when sensitive electronic communications were not routinely encrypted; today, the names simply serve for purposes of brevity, clarity, and tradition.

== Post-presidency ==
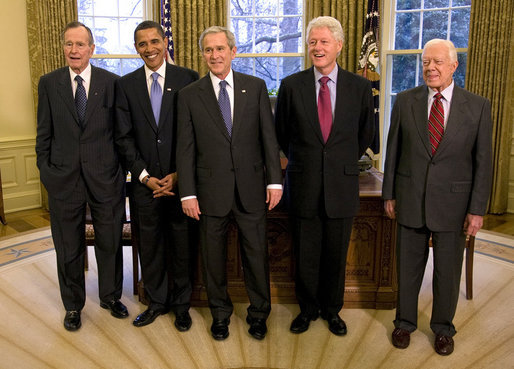
From left to right: Presidents George H. W. Bush, Barack Obama, George W. Bush, Bill Clinton, and Jimmy Carter in the Oval Office on January 7, 2009; Obama took office thirteen days later

=== Activities ===
Some former presidents have had significant careers after leaving office. Prominent examples include William Howard Taft's tenure as chief justice of the United States and Herbert Hoover's work on government reorganization after World War II. Two former presidents served in Congress after leaving the White House: John Quincy Adams was elected to the House of Representatives, serving there for 17 years, and Andrew Johnson returned to the Senate in 1875, though he died soon after. Two former presidents returned to the presidency: Grover Cleveland lost in 1888 and won in 1892, and Donald Trump lost in 2020 and won in 2024. Some ex-presidents were very active, especially in international affairs, including Theodore Roosevelt; Herbert Hoover; Richard Nixon; and Jimmy Carter.

Earlier presidents returned to their hometowns to lead charitable work there, or supervised farm work on their farms or plantations, many of which had been neglected during their presidencies. Thomas Jefferson founded the University of Virginia during his post-presidency, and, following his death, was succeeded as rector by James Madison. Madison and James Monroe participated in the drafting of one version of the Virginia Constitution, while John Tyler served at the Confederate Constitution and in the Confederate Congress.

Presidents may use their predecessors as emissaries to deliver private messages to other nations or as official representatives of the United States to state funerals and other important foreign events. Richard Nixon made multiple foreign trips to countries including China and Russia and was lauded as an elder statesman. During his post-presidency, Jimmy Carter became a global human rights campaigner, international arbiter, and election monitor, as well as a recipient of the Nobel Peace Prize. Bill Clinton also worked as an informal ambassador, most recently in the negotiations that led to the release of two American journalists, Laura Ling and Euna Lee, from North Korea.

During his presidency, George W. Bush called on former presidents George H. W. Bush and Clinton to assist with humanitarian efforts after the 2004 Indian Ocean earthquake and tsunami. President Obama followed suit by asking presidents Clinton and George W. Bush to lead efforts to aid Haiti after an earthquake devastated that country in 2010. Clinton's relationship with the two Bushes is not the first friendship between former presidents: Carter enjoyed a friendship and correspondence with Gerald Ford, while Jefferson and John Adams had an extended correspondence through letters in their post-presidencies.

Clinton has been active politically since his presidential term ended, working with his wife Hillary on her 2008 and 2016 presidential bids and President Obama on his 2012 reelection campaign. Obama has also been active politically since his presidential term ended, having worked with his former vice president Joe Biden on his 2020 election campaign and Biden's vice president Kamala Harris on her 2024 election campaign after President Biden withdrew his bid for re-election.

After losing his bid for the presidency in 2020, Trump remained politically active and was an outspoken critic of his successor and the Democratic Party. He also contended with four criminal cases. Trump announced his fourth bid to the presidency in 2022, ultimately becoming the nominee of his party for the third time and won a second presidential term in 2024.

=== Pension and other benefits ===
The Former Presidents Act (FPA), enacted in 1958, grants lifetime benefits to former presidents and their widows, including a monthly pension, medical care in military facilities, health insurance, and Secret Service protection; also provided is funding for a certain number of staff and for office expenses. The act has been amended several times to provide increases in presidential pensions and in the allowances for office staff. The FPA excludes any president who was removed from office by impeachment.

According to a 2008 report by the Congressional Research Service:

Chief executives leaving office prior to 1958 often entered retirement pursuing various occupations and received no federal assistance. When industrialist Andrew Carnegie announced a plan in 1912 to offer $25,000 annual pensions to former Presidents, many Members of Congress deemed it inappropriate that such a pension would be provided by a private corporation executive. That same year, legislation was first introduced to create presidential pensions, but it was not enacted. In 1955, such legislation was considered by Congress because of former President Harry S. Truman's financial limitations in hiring an office staff

The pension has increased numerous times with congressional approval. Retired presidents receive a pension based on the salary of the current administration's cabinet secretaries, which was $199,700 per year in 2012. Former presidents who served in Congress may also collect congressional pensions. The act also provides former presidents with travel funds and franking privileges.

Prior to 1997, all former presidents, their spouses, and their children until age 16 were protected by the Secret Service until the president's death. In 1997, Congress passed legislation limiting Secret Service protection to no more than 10 years from the date a president leaves office. On January 10, 2013, President Obama signed legislation reinstating lifetime Secret Service protection for him, George W. Bush, and all subsequent presidents. A first spouse who remarries is no longer eligible for Secret Service protection.

=== Writing ===
Since the publication of Ulysses S. Grant's Personal Memoirs in 1885, most presidents, including every president who survived to the end of their term from Calvin Coolidge to Barack Obama, has written at least one autobiography. These autobiographies serve two purposes: to ensure the First Family's financial security (Clinton made more than $30 million from writing two books), but also to defend or rehabilitate presidential legacies.

=== Presidential libraries and historic sites ===
The homes where U.S. presidents were born, lived or vacationed have frequently been preserved as house museums and listed as National Historic Sites or on U.S. National Register of Historic Places.

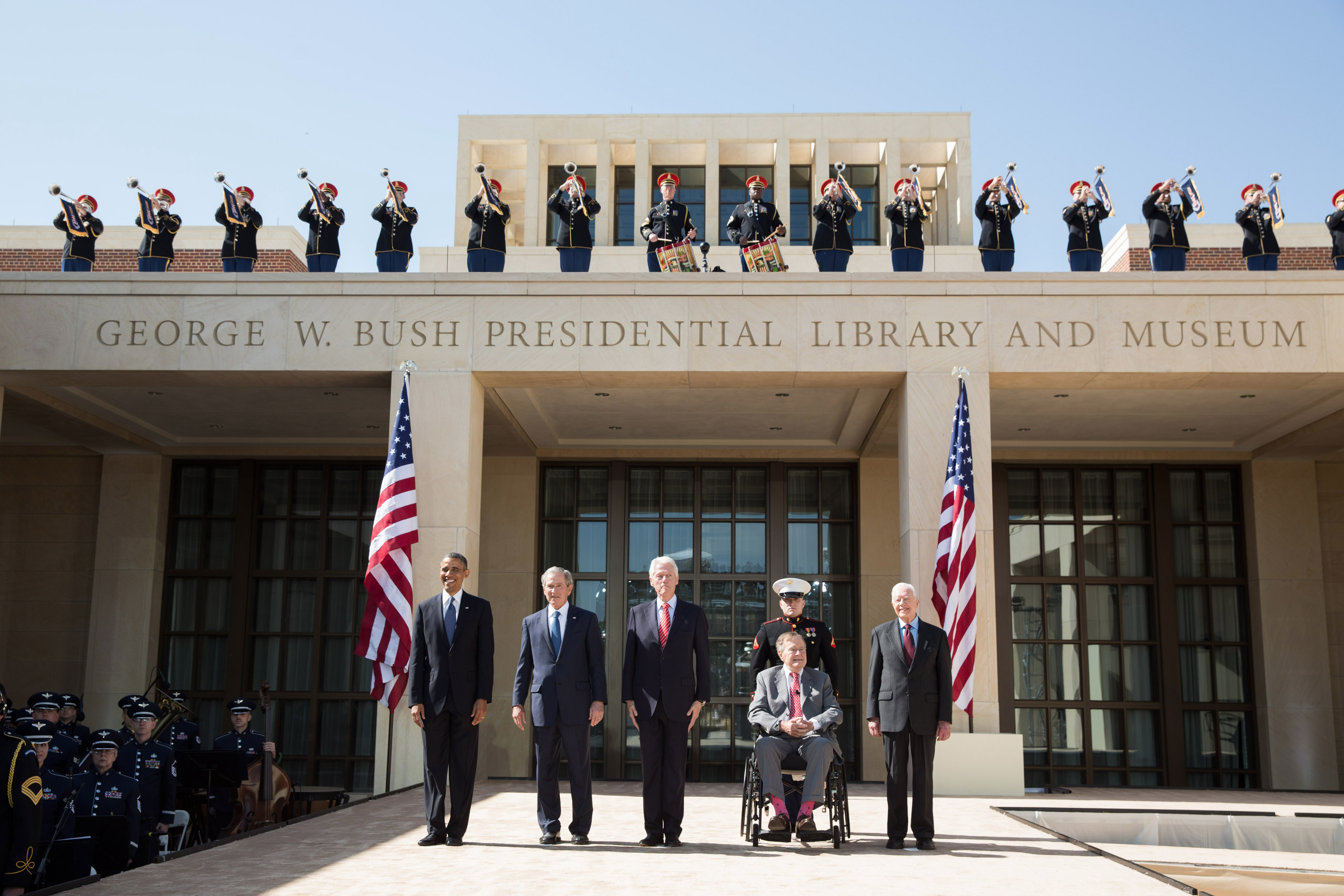
From left to right: Presidents Barack Obama, George W. Bush, Bill Clinton, George H. W. Bush, and Jimmy Carter at the dedication of the George W. Bush Presidential Library and Museum in Dallas in 2013

Every president since Herbert Hoover has created a repository known as a presidential library for preserving and making available his papers, records, and other documents and materials. Completed libraries are deeded to and maintained by the National Archives and Records Administration (NARA); the initial funding for building and equipping each library must come from private, non-federal sources. There are currently thirteen presidential libraries in the NARA system. There are also presidential libraries maintained by state governments and private foundations and Universities of Higher Education, including:

- The Abraham Lincoln Presidential Library and Museum, which is run by the State of Illinois;
- The George W. Bush Presidential Library and Museum, which is run by Southern Methodist University;
- The George H. W. Bush Presidential Library and Museum, which is run by Texas A&M University; and
- The Lyndon Baines Johnson Presidential Library and Museum, which is run by the University of Texas at Austin.

Several former presidents have overseen the building and opening of their own presidential libraries. Some even made arrangements for their own burial at the site. Several presidential libraries contain the graves of the president they document:

- The Harry S. Truman Presidential Library and Museum in Independence, Missouri;
- The Dwight D. Eisenhower Presidential Library, Museum and Boyhood Home in Abilene, Kansas;
- The Richard Nixon Presidential Library and Museum in Yorba Linda, California; and
- The Ronald Reagan Presidential Library and Museum in Simi Valley, California.

These gravesites are open to the general public. In some cases (such as with Nixon), the presidential library is adjacent to one of the president's former homes, where in other cases, such as with Lyndon Johnson and Jimmy Carter, the presidential library and the historic site are in different cities entirely.

== Political affiliation ==
Political parties have dominated American politics for most of the nation's history. Though the Founding Fathers generally spurned political parties as divisive and disruptive, and their rise had not been anticipated when the U.S. Constitution was drafted in 1787, organized political parties developed in the U.S. in the mid-1790s nonetheless. They evolved from political factions, which began to appear almost immediately after the Federal government came into existence. Those who supported the Washington administration were referred to as "pro-administration" and would eventually form the Federalist Party, while those in opposition largely joined the emerging Democratic-Republican Party.

Greatly concerned about the very real capacity of political parties to destroy the fragile unity holding the nation together, Washington remained unaffiliated with any political faction or party throughout his eight-year presidency. He was, and remains, the only U.S. president never to be affiliated with a political party. Since Washington, every U.S. president has been affiliated with a political party at the time of assuming office, and, since 1869, every president has been a member of either the Republican or Democratic Parties.

The number of presidents per political party by their affiliation at the time they were first sworn into office (alphabetical, by last name) are:

Party	Number of presidents	Name(s)
Republican	19	Chester A. Arthur, George H. W. Bush, George W. Bush, Calvin Coolidge, Dwight D. Eisenhower, Gerald Ford, James A. Garfield, Ulysses S. Grant, Warren G. Harding, Benjamin Harrison, Rutherford B. Hayes, Herbert Hoover, Abraham Lincoln, (Note: Republican Abraham Lincoln was elected for a second term as part of the National Union Party ticket with Democrat Andrew Johnson in 1864.) William McKinley, Richard Nixon, Ronald Reagan, Theodore Roosevelt, William Howard Taft, and Donald Trump (incumbent)
Democratic	15	Joe Biden, James Buchanan, Jimmy Carter, Grover Cleveland, Bill Clinton, Andrew Jackson, Lyndon B. Johnson, John F. Kennedy, Barack Obama, Franklin Pierce, James K. Polk, Franklin D. Roosevelt, Harry S. Truman, Martin Van Buren, and Woodrow Wilson
Democratic-Republican	4	John Quincy Adams, Thomas Jefferson, James Madison, and James Monroe
Whig	4	Millard Fillmore, William Henry Harrison, Zachary Taylor, and John Tyler (Note: Former Democrat John Tyler was elected vice president on the Whig Party ticket with Harrison in 1840. Tyler's policy priorities as president soon proved to be opposed to most of the Whig agenda, and he was expelled from the party in September 1841.)
National Union	2	Abraham Lincoln, and Andrew Johnson (Note: Democrat Andrew Johnson was elected vice president on the National Union Party ticket with Republican Abraham Lincoln in 1864. Later, while president, Johnson tried and failed to build a party of loyalists under the National Union banner. Near the end of his presidency, Johnson rejoined the Democratic Party.)
Federalist	1	John Adams
Independent (No party)	1	George Washington

== Timeline of presidents ==
The following timeline depicts the progression of the presidents and their political affiliation at the time of assuming office.

== See also ==
- Outline of American politics
