= Howard Rich =

American businessman and political consultant

- Born: February 13, 1940 (age 86); Brooklyn, New York U.S.
- Education: Baruch College, NY, NY
- Alma mater: New York University Stern School of Business
- Occupation: Real estate investor
- Known for: Libertarian activism
- Spouse: Andrea Rich (died 2018)
- Awards: Herman W. Lay; Memorial Award

Howard S. Rich, also known as Howie Rich, is an American real estate investor who is notable for funding libertarian-oriented political initiatives such as term limits, school choice, parental rights regarding education, limited government, and property rights. He has published essays advocating these positions. He founded advocacy organizations including Americans for Limited Government and U.S. Term Limits. He is the former chairman of the Legislative Education Action Drive and the Parents in Charge Foundation. Rich has been described as one of the "lower-profile moneymen in American politics" but as a prominent "force in elections across the country." Rich focuses his advocacy mostly on local issues like term limits, not on national campaigns, and doesn't see himself as leaning right or left. National Public Radio identified Rich as a leader behind the independent groups with potential to influence elections.

== Early life and education ==
Rich attended the George W. Wingate High School in Brooklyn, New York. While a senior, he earned the New York State Regents scholarship. He studied economics at Baruch College in New York City. He studied investing at the New York University Stern School of Business. Rich initially had a plumbing contracting business, but used its revenues to buy real estate. He became a real estate entrepreneur around 1965. He began a pattern of buying Manhattan properties, fixing them up, and selling them. In 1970, he bought a multi-residential building. During the next two decades he bought more buildings and modernized them. Rich described his real estate strategy: "I bought buildings when no one else wanted them, then I sold them." By 1986, he owned 17 buildings but sold 15 buildings. After the 1987 stock market crash he sold one more building. In 1989 he exchanged his remaining property for a property in Houston. In the 1990s he began purchasing Manhattan properties again. In the 2000s, he sold some Manhattan properties and bought garden apartment developments in different states.

== Political activism ==
=== Libertarian Party ===
Before 1983, Rich was active in the Libertarian Party and worked with Charles Koch to promote small-government and free-market causes. After 1983, Rich left the Libertarian Party and continued his activism with private groups. In 1990, Rich and his wife, Andrea, took over the Libertarian Review Foundation and renamed it the Center for Independent Thought. Rich's wife was an owner of Laissez Faire Books and was a trustee of the Atlas Economic Research Foundation. While Rich has supported the Libertarian Party, he is enrolled as a Republican.

=== Cato Institute ===
Rich serves on the board of directors of the Cato Institute.

=== Non-partisan activism ===
In 1992, Rich met Bill Wilson and the two worked together on a variety of causes. Rich financed Wilson's efforts at U.S. Term Limits, Parents in Charge and Americans for Limited Government. Wilson described these organizations not as libertarian but rather as "rolling back the government." Rich explained his mission was to "advance individual freedom and create an atmosphere where we restore the Founders' concepts of property rights and free markets." Rich became more politically active in the movement to limit government beginning about 1992. He has supported referendum measures that would limit government spending, curb the seizure of land, and scholarship tax credits. He prefers underwriting ballot measures rather than lobbying in state capitols. Rich explained: "Working with the state legislators is a fool's errand" and added "Most of them are RINOs (Republicans in Name Only) who water things down to nothing."

=== Americans for Limited Government ===
Rich was a supporter of Americans for Limited Government which was headed by Bill Wilson. In 2009, it had a budget of US$4 million, though by 2014, the budget was down to $1.1 million. This group has been described as non-partisan. It has been critical of President Barack Obama. Wilson was quoted as saying "It isn't one issue – health care, or cap and trade, or one or another appointee ... It's that government consumes more and more of what we call personal liberty." The organization has also criticized former president George W. Bush for "egregious federal power-grabs" regarding the USA Patriot Act, No Child Left Behind and Medicare.

=== Term limits ===
In 1992 Rich founded U.S. Term Limits, which supports limits on the length of office of officials at the local, state, and federal levels. He is chairman of U.S. Term Limits. Rich financed many term limits movements in the 1990s. In an editorial, Rich posed the question: "Who's in charge – the people or politicians?" He criticized political connections between political contributors and government contractors and wrote: "When government contracts are being handed out, all qualified companies should have a fair chance at getting public business, not just companies that donate to the re-election campaigns of entrenched politicians or hold cocktail parties at expensive restaurants in their honor." He believes term limits are a way to restore popular control over government. He wrote: "The longer politicians are in office, the more likely they are to rip us off for their own benefit – rewarding the donors who funded their campaigns and the special interests who keep them in power rather than the people they should be serving." He wrote that term limits force politicians "to represent the people instead of advancing their own careers." According to Rich, he and his groups were successful in creating term limits for 15 state legislatures. He was agitated by plans of the New York City Council to undo term-limit laws passed by a referendum, and compared a possible repeal to undoing the smoking ban. In USA Today, he wrote in an editorial that American voters "overwhelmingly support term limits" and that "citizens value fresh ideas, new perspectives and more competitive elections more than the so-called institutional knowledge of the political ruling class." Rich opposed New York City mayor Bloomberg's quest for a third mayoral term. He opposes career politicians generally. In 2008, a senior senator of the legislature of Nebraska blamed Rich and term limits for his "forced retirement," but Rich responded in a letter to the editor of The New York Times that "term limits have never been aimed at any one individual, but rather at an underlying culture of abuse that invariably tends to place the voracious appetites of government institutions over the best interests of the people they are there to serve."

=== Property rights ===
The Kelo v. New London Supreme Court decision ruled that states could, at their discretion, decide whether it was permissible to permit property to be taken from some owners under the doctrine of eminent domain and given to other owners. There was a public backlash. Rich helped engineer and encourage a number of ballot initiatives in state elections in 2006 to rein in such takings. Rich said "I believe that property rights in many respects have been taken away from many property owners." As a result, in 2006 many states particularly in the west put initiatives on the ballot restricting eminent domain. Rich helped fund activities in favor of these initiatives.

Rich supported a ballot initiative in California called Proposition 90 which prohibited cities from "using their condemnation powers to transfer property from one owner to the other." It generated significant controversy. Property rights referendums on 12 state ballots became the "biggest ballot issue" in 2006. By September 2006, Rich gave US$1.77 million to advocate "yes" on Proposition 90, dubbed by proponents as the Protect Our Homes Act, while various opponents gave US$1.5 million to advocate against it. A second estimate was that Rich gave US$2.75 million via the Fund for Democracy and Americans for Limited Government to foster advocacy of eminent domain initiatives in California, Nevada, Arizona, Washington, Idaho and Montana. Another estimate was that by November 2006, Rich spent US$15 million promoting state initiatives.

Sometimes the group paid people as much as US$4 to sign a petition to put the initiatives on the ballot, according to one report from the San Francisco Chronicle which ran editorials opposing the referendum. According to a second source, prices paid for signatures to petition the ballot initiatives ranged from $1 in California to $3 in Arizona. The San Francisco Chronicle, however, felt California's Proposition 90 initiative went too far and would restrict the power of the state government to create "rights-of-way for utilities" and it worried that states would be unable to enforce environmental laws since it would be required to compensate property owners for "any substantial economic loss." A reporter for USA Today suggested the referendums might "gut local and state abilities to enact or enforce virtually any regulations affecting private land use and development." Critics of the property rights proposals suggest the downside is "voting to destroy all land-use regulation."

In 2006, Americans for Limited Government and other groups spent millions trying to get property rights ballot initiatives in western states such as California, Washington, Idaho, and Arizona. One estimate is that Rich contributed as much as $11 million to support property rights initiatives on ballots throughout much of the West. The ballot initiatives succeeded in nine of eleven states but failed in California and Idaho. In 2006, three of Rich's budget-trimming "Taxpayer Bill of Rights" proposals failed, but nine of his twelve eminent domain relief referendums passed overwhelmingly including states such as Louisiana, Florida, and South Carolina. In total, 26 states passed laws that ban the use of eminent domain for economic development purposes.

=== Education reform ===
In 2000 Rich founded the Legislative Education Action Drive, or LEAD, which focused on enacting school choice legislation across the country. Rich is also chairman of the Parents in Charge Foundation. Rich criticized American schools for being "monopolistic" and a "millstone around our children's necks" and wrote that "America consistently (was) lagging behind its industrialized peers in academic achievement." He felt a "competitive education market" would lead to "innovation and improvement" yet he believed the "educational establishment" is opposed to change.

=== Board memberships ===
Rich is on the board of the Club for Growth. It supports state affiliates across the nation. Rich is chairman of U.S. Term Limits. He is a director of the Fund for Democracy which provides seed money to state initiative campaigns. Rich also financially supported the libertarian magazine Reason. He is also a director of the Cato Institute.

=== Judges ===
Rich also champions the position of holding "judges accountable to the rule of law." Rich criticized two 5–4 decisions by the Supreme Court – U.S. Term Limits v. Thornton and Kelo v. New London. Rich said: "The same Gang of Five who overrode millions of votes in favor of term limits in 23 states – ten years later sanctioned handing over private property to private developers to build condos." Rich's group has done last-minute ad blitzes in judicial elections.

== Votenet Solutions ownership ==
In 2001, Rich acquired the web-based voting software and systems firm, Votenet Solutions during the Dot-com bubble. Following the acquisition, federal investigators charged the company's CEO and CFO with embezzlement of hundreds of thousands of dollars from nonprofit clients and employee 401(k) accounts. Rich later referred to the event as "the most painful period of my business life."

== Reception ==
Rich has been attacked by left-leaning activists. One reporter for the National Review wrote, "'Howie Rich from New York City' has become the Left's latest whipping boy." One pamphlet accused Rich of "dirty tactics, hidden money streams, and shadowy operatives." He's been accused of being a "special interest group" and of operating a "tangled extremist web." Rich responded: "I have been fortunate enough to have been successful in business, and I want to do something in this life to advance liberty." Rich said: "It's very difficult in many of these states, and very expensive, to get these measures on the ballot ... All I have done here, for the most part, is provide seed money. All of these initiatives are left up to the voters. That's what these people, who consider money evil, are not willing to address. It's the voters in these states who ultimately make the decisions."

A news report from National Public Radio (NPR) on the show NOW on PBS accused Rich and his organizations of "secretly providing major funding for ballot measures". Rich was accused of using his political advocacy as a means to "shield his portfolio from sticky-fingered bureaucrats" but he countered "It's a crock" and said "I own no real estate in any of the 12 states where we had property-rights initiatives on the ballot." Rich has been vocal about his financial support of libertarian-related causes. The San Francisco Chronicle wrote "real estate mogul Howie Rich … makes no secret of his desire to rein in the power of government."

A letter campaign in August 2008 by the left-leaning organization Accountable America to donors of right-leaning organizations warned the donors about possible repercussions for contributing to right-wing organizations that might possibly be illegal; in another instance, a US$100,000 reward was offered for information about "unlawful conduct by business-oriented or conservative" nonprofit groups and promised to publicize the "'political and business relationships and corrupt activities' of donors to these causes." Later, perhaps as a response to this activity by the left, Rich launched a donor-surveillance letter campaign aimed at liberal donors. Rich's mailing was "two months behind the Democrats" letter campaign. One estimate was that Rich sent 11,000 letters to left-leaning supporters of liberal causes. Rich's letters to prominent liberal contributors of liberal causes told them that he's watching these donations; the letter read as follows: "As a donor to one or more of these organizations and efforts, you have been able to engage in these activities without notice, operating in relative obscurity … I am writing to inform you that this will no longer be the case." There was a threat of exposing donations which violated laws or which were being funneled for illegal purposes. According to a newspaper account afterwards, the letters from both sides tried to discourage donors to so-called 527 groups which is "lightly regulated money" that "swamped the 2004 election." Both liberal left-wing groups such as Accountable America and advocates such as Rich were criticized for "trying to chill free speech" with efforts to intimidate donors to political causes.

== Motivation ==
In an interview in South Carolina, a reporter asked Rich: "I don't know anyone who invests the kind of money without getting something in return?" Rich replied:

There is great satisfaction. I went to public schools. My wife did. My two sons did. Here's an opportunity to give back something where kids will have an opportunity and parents will have an opportunity to go to a school of their choice not some school mandated by government. If every proposal that I have favored over the last 20 years got enacted, whether it's term limits or school choice or property rights or any area – I get no personal benefit out of it. I don't make a nickel. Here in South Carolina I own no property. I have no businesses down here. So there's no real monetary benefit.

== Awards ==
In 2000, he received the Herman W. Lay Memorial Award for work in the educational arena.
