= Mohamed v. Jeppesen Dataplan, Inc. =

2010 United States Court of Appeals case

- Court: United States Court of Appeals for the Ninth Circuit
- Full case name: Binyam Mohamed, et al., v. Jeppesen Dataplan, Inc.
- Argued: February 9, 2009
- Reargued: December 15, 2009
- Decided: September 8, 2010
- Citation: 614 F.3d 1070

Case history
- Prior history: 539 F. Supp. 2d 1128 (N.D. Cal. 2008); 579 F.3d 943 (9th Cir. 2009)
- Subsequent history: Cert. denied, May 16, 2011

Court membership
- Judges sitting: Alex Kozinski, Mary M. Schroeder, William C. Canby, Michael Daly Hawkins, Sidney R. Thomas, Raymond C. Fisher, Richard A. Paez, Richard C. Tallman, Johnnie B. Rawlinson, Consuelo M. Callahan, Carlos Bea

Case opinions
- Majority: Fisher, joined by Kozinski, Tallman, Rawlinson, Callahan, Bea
- Concurrence: Bea
- Dissent: Hawkins, joined by Schroeder, Canby, Thomas, Paez

Mohamed et al. v. Jeppesen Dataplan, Inc., is a case brought by the American Civil Liberties Union (ACLU) on behalf of five victims of extraordinary renditions against Jeppesen Dataplan, Inc., which had provided services that the Central Intelligence Agency (CIA) used to perform renditions.

== Background ==
According to an article that appeared in October 2006 in The New Yorker, the CIA is a Jeppesen customer. The article claims that the company has provided navigational and logistics support to the agency's extraordinary rendition program. The article says Jeppesen provided "flight plans, clearance to fly over other countries, hotel reservations, and ground-crew arrangements" to the CIA. According to the article, an unnamed former employee quoted Bob Overby, Jeppesen's managing director, as saying at a meeting, "We do all of the extraordinary renditions flights—you know, the torture flights. ... Let's face it, some of those flights end up that way... It certainly pays well."

On November 16, 2006, Amnesty International staged a demonstration in front of the company's International Trip and Flight Planning Office in San Jose, California to protest their involvement in the rendition program. In December 2006 representatives of the South Bay Mobilization for Peace and Justice group asked the San Jose City Council to remove a Jeppesen banner from a city skating rink. The group also holds a weekly vigil at the company's offices.

== ACLU lawsuit ==
On May 30, 2007, the ACLU sued Jeppesen on behalf of five plaintiffs who had been tortured in Morocco, Egypt and a United States base in Afghanistan. The suit alleged that, since 2001, Jeppesen provided support for at least seventy flights for the CIA's secret extraordinary rendition program, transporting prisoners overseas to be tortured. The suit was dismissed in February 2008 on a motion from the United States government, on the theory that proceeding with the case would reveal state secrets and endanger relations with other nations that had cooperated.

On September 8, 2010, in a 6–5 en banc ruling, the United States Court of Appeals for the Ninth Circuit affirmed the dismissal of the suit, and the ACLU filed an appeal with the Supreme Court in December 2010.

On May 16, 2011, the Supreme Court declined to review the decision of the Ninth Circuit to dismiss the case.
