= Americans for Limited Government =

Non-profit organization

- Founders: Howard Rich, Tom Coburn and Bill Wilson
- Established: 1996
- Mission: "To reduce the size and scope of government to maximize individual freedom."
- President: Rick Manning
- Address: 10332 Main Street, Box 326 Fairfax, VA 22030
- Location: Fairfax, Virginia, United States
- Website: Official website

Americans for Limited Government (ALG) is a conservative 501(c)(4) non-profit organization "dedicated to restoring the constitutional, limited powers of government at the federal, state, and local level... by fighting to reduce the size and scope of government, protecting individuals rights, promoting federalism, and rolling back the tyranny of the administrative state." ALG is focused on "fiscal responsibility, regulatory reform, transparency and shedding light on overlooked issues that impact people's lives."

== Activities ==
=== Consolidated Appropriations Amendments of 2016 ===
In recent years, ALG's primary focus has been on the restoration of Congress' Article I power of the purse, and supporting de-funding efforts to halt what it views as overreaching administrative state actions by the executive branch. In 2016, ALG supported the "Consolidated Appropriations Amendments of 2016" by U.S. Rep. Ken Buck (R-Colo.), which the group said would "begin the process of restoring Congress' rightful, constitutional powers."

=== U.S. oversight of the Internet's domain name system ===
One of the more prominent de-funding efforts supported by ALG was the successful de-funding in fiscal years 2015 and 2016 of the United States Department of Commerce's transition of U.S. oversight of the Internet domain name system. ALG supported Republican congressional efforts to prohibit the National Telecommunications and Information Administration from using any funds to carry out any transition control of the Internet's domain name system functions to the private ICANN.

U.S. Rep. Sean Duffy (R-Wis.) authored the amendment to the Department of Commerce appropriations bill that denied funding to the administration to perform the transition. The amendment passed 229 to 178 on May 30, 2014. The provision was then retained in the fiscal year 2015 omnibus spending bill, the fiscal year 2015 continuing resolution, and then again in the fiscal year 2016 omnibus spending bill, effectively delaying implementation of the transition until September 30, 2016.

On May 24, 2016, ALG's president, Rick Manning, testified before the United States Senate Committee on Commerce, Science, and Transportation in opposition to the transition of U.S. oversight of the Internet's domain name system.

ALG's Freedom of Information Act (FOIA) requests directed at NTIA were featured in The Wall Street Journal by L. Gordon Crovitz in 2014 and 2016, and exposed what the group contended was a lack of agency analysis showing legal authority by the government to complete the transition prior to the transition's announcement on March 14, 2014, and what the group said was a lack of antitrust analysis performed by NTIA prior to the agency's Internet domain name system transition approval to ICANN on June 9, 2016.

=== De-funding Housing and Urban Development's takeover of local zoning decisions ===
Another successful de-funding effort supported by ALG was against the Housing and Urban Development's "Affirmatively Furthering Fair Housing." According to the rule, published in the Federal Register, "This final rule, and Assessment Tools and guidance to be issued, will assist recipients of Federal funding to use that funding and, if necessary, adjust their land use and zoning laws in accordance with their existing legal obligation to affirmatively further fair housing," in ALG's view nationalizing local zoning decisions from approximately 1,200 cities and counties that receive community development block grants. ALG was a strong advocate against the regulation and came out in support of U.S. Rep. Paul Gosar's (R-Ariz.) amendment which passed the House Transportation and HUD Appropriations bill in 2014. and 2015.

=== Trans-Pacific Partnership ===
ALG led conservative opposition to the 12-nation Trans-Pacific Partnership trade deal, which was ultimately never approved by Congress and was later rescinded by President Donald Trump in January 2017. ALG launched http://stopbadtradedeals.org to promote the campaign.

=== Opposing NSA surveillance ===
In 2013, ALG joined with over 100 civil liberties groups including the Electronic Frontier Foundation and the American Civil Liberties Union to oppose mass surveillance by the National Security Agency (NSA) in the wake of whistle blower Edward Snowden's publication of classified information revealing domestic telecommunications companies collecting the phone records of American citizens. ALG supported an amendment by U.S. Rep. Justin Amash (R-Mich.) that would have de-funded domestic surveillance to collect communications data, per the legislation, "if such things do not pertain to a person who is the subject of an investigation."

=== Other efforts ===
ALG has also supported efforts to de-fund the Corporation for Public Broadcasting including PBS and NPR, and various energy and environmental regulations.

On April 20, 2016, House Speaker Paul Ryan directly cited ALG as one of the conservative groups supporting the Puerto Rico Oversight, Management, and Economic Stability Act (PROMESA), and quoted ALG President Rick Manning as saying "The United States finds itself in a difficult position in relation to the Puerto Rican debt crisis. Speaker Paul Ryan, House Natural Resources Committee Chairman Rob Bishop and Financial Services Subcommittee Chairman Sean Duffy have put together a thoughtful approach to protect the U.S. taxpayers by imposing a tested mechanism for getting the territory's finances under control and by creating a controlled environment for restructuring Puerto Rico's unsustainable $72 billion of debt that will keep taxpayers off the hook."

In 2008, ALG opposed financial bailouts of banks that bet poorly on U.S. housing, including the passage of the Troubled Asset Relief Program and in 2010, efforts by the United States Federal Reserve to purchase back some $1.25 trillion of mortgage-backed securities from banks all over the world, including more than $440 billion that was given to foreign banks.

In 2009, ALG opposed passage of the Patient Protection and Affordable Care Act and in 2010, opposed the Dodd-Frank financial legislation, including its creation of the so-called "orderly liquidation fund" the group warned would be used to bail out banks and the Office of Financial Research that the group charged invaded individual privacy of financial transactions.

In 2009, ALG developed the database used by TaxDayTeaParty.com that enabled users to organize tea parties in their local communities on April 15, 2009.

In 2009 and 2010, ALG opposed legislation providing $154 billion to state and local governments, calling it a "bailout [of] the public sector unions in bankrupt states like California and New York."

In 2011, ALG supported efforts by congressional Republicans to leverage the vote on the debt ceiling in exchange for a constitutional amendment to cut, cap, and balance the federal budget.

In 2011 and 2012, ALG opposed the use of U.S. funds at the International Monetary Fund (IMF) to bail out Greece, Ireland and Portugal, which were caught in the European sovereign debt crisis, and urged Congress to roll back the 2009 expansion of the IMF including the $100 billion New Arrangements to Borrow, supporting legislation offered by U.S. Rep. Cathy McMorris Rodgers (R-WA). In 2016, ALG opposed another $56.7 billion expansion of the IMF that was included in the fiscal year 2016 omnibus spending bill.

In 2013, ALG supported efforts to condition passage of the fiscal year 2014 continuing resolution on de-funding the health care law that led to a brief, partial shutdown of federal government functions.

== Media and publications ==
ALG's impact can be seen through multiple media outlets. On February 16, 2017, CQ Roll Call published an article focused on ALG's position on U.S. trade policy. The Wall Street Journal's front-page story on March 10, 2016, titled "Free Trade Loses Political Favor" directly quoted ALG President Rick Manning and cited a poll commissioned by ALG and performed by Pat Caddell on voter attitudes towards trade.

== Donald Trump ==
Prior to announcing his run for president, in a radio spot sponsored by ALG, Donald Trump came out in opposition to legislation providing trade promotion authority to negotiate the Trans-Pacific Partnership (TPP).

Since Trump took office, ALG has participated in White House meetings, providing advice on a variety of issues such as proposed changes to the health care law, the debt ceiling and U.S. trade policy.

Additionally, Fox News published an opinion piece in which ALG came out as a supporter of President Trump's budget plan that cuts non-defense discretionary spending by more than $50 billion.
