= Bill Wilson (activist) =

Limited government activist

- Born: 1953 (age 72–73); Maryland
- Education: University of Delaware
- Occupation: Activist for small government
- Known for: Americans for Limited Government
- Website: www.getliberty.org

Bill Wilson (born 1953) is an American conservative activist. He is a board member and former president of Americans for Limited Government, a Virginia-based non-profit group promoting small government. During his career, he has worked with groups advocating for right-to-work laws, term limits and school choice.

== Personal life ==
Wilson grew up in a military household in rural Maryland. He has said that “I was raised to believe and have always believed that small government is best.” He would go on to graduate from the University of Delaware in 1975 earning a degree in political science. His career in the field of politics began shortly thereafter, when he worked on Ronald Reagan’s campaign during the 1976 Delaware primary as a Youth Coordinator. He currently resides in Fairfax, Virginia with his wife Tessie, with whom he has two grown children.

== Political career ==
Wilson’s political career began in 1976 as a youth director for the Reagan for President Campaign in Maryland and southeast Pennsylvania. Later that year he began working for the National Right to Work Committee as an organizer in several western states. Over the next ten years Wilson continued to work for the National Right to Work Committee where he became Vice President of Operations and lobbied to enact Idaho’s Right to Work Law in 1986.

In 1992, Wilson met Howard Rich, a successful New York real estate investor and like-minded political activist. In 1994, Wilson joined U.S. Term Limits as a managerial adviser overseeing various projects and initiative campaigns. Wilson worked with various organizations including Parents in Charge and Americans for Limited Government. As a founding board member of U.S. Term Limits, Wilson served on the organization's executive committee from 1996 to 2006 when he assumed the role of president.

Americans for Limited Government (ALG) is a non-profit research and advocacy organization based in Virginia. ALG's focus has been on establishing its online presence through new media resources. In 2007, with help from his children, Wilson began cultivating the organizations' internet presence with Getliberty.org and later with NetRightDaily.com.
