= Accountable America =

Accountable America is a left-wing political group created in the summer of 2008. Its goal is to reduce political donations to conservative 527 groups.

Founded by liberal political operative Tom Matzzie, the group's first activity was a letter sent to donors warning them that giving to conservative causes might lead to legal trouble or cause political activists to research their background and past activities for humiliating material that could be made public, techniques that founder Tom Mattzie described as "going for the jugular".

The group has offered a $100,000 reward for information on a conservative independent group that can show criminal or civil illegality. The group raised $200,000 in its first two weeks.

Judd Legum, research director in the presidential campaign or Senator Hillary Clinton, is research director for the organization.
