= Veto power in the United States =

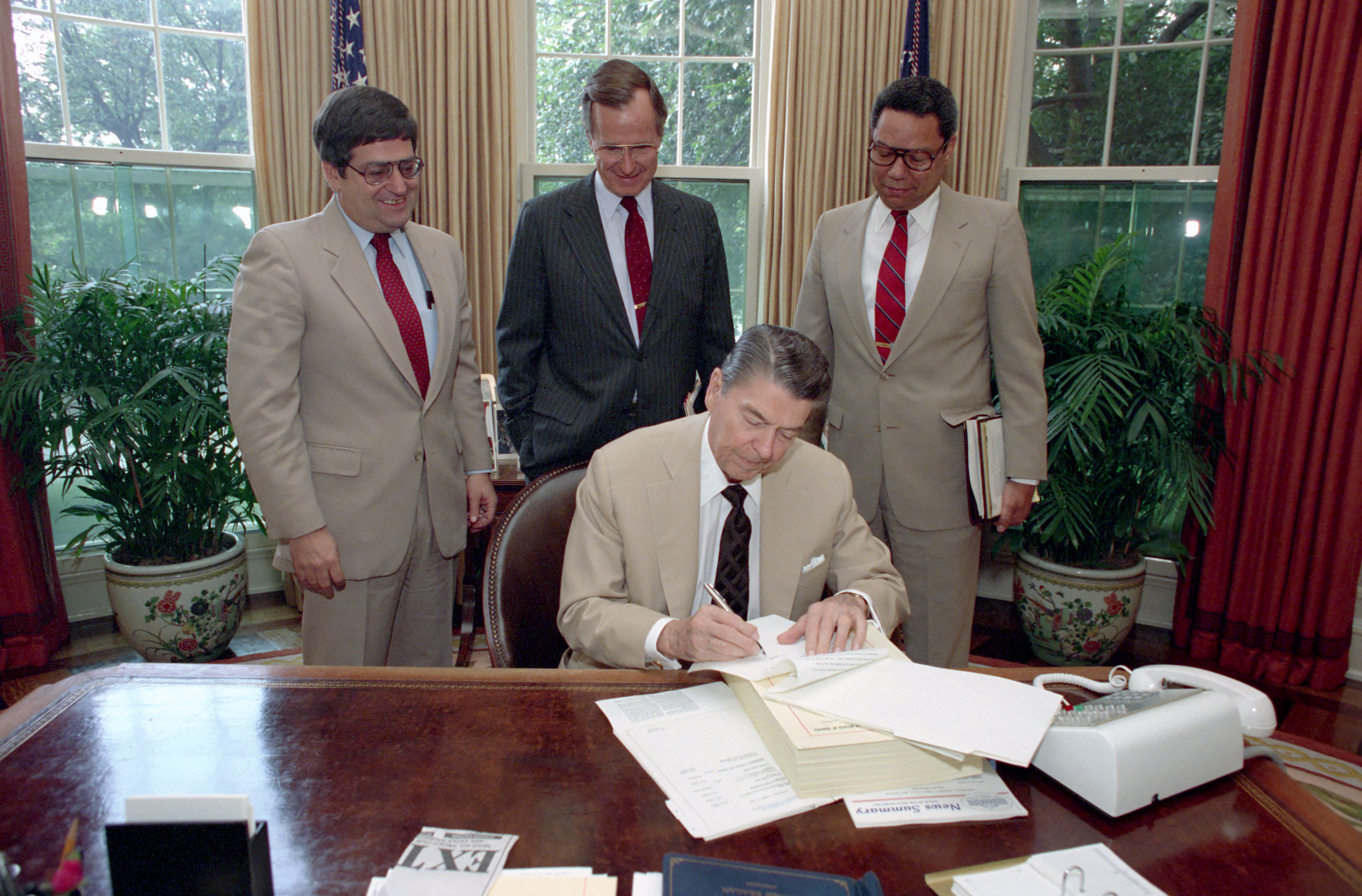
Ronald Reagan signing a veto in 1988

In the United States, Article I, Section 7 of the Constitution provides that the president can veto bills passed by the Congress before they become law, while also sending the bill back to its chamber of origin. Congress can override the veto by a two-thirds vote of both chambers. (Note: The House and Senate.)

All state and territorial governors have a similar veto power, as do some mayors and county executives. In many states and territories the governor has additional veto powers, including line-item, amendatory and reduction vetoes. Veto powers also exist in some, but not all, tribal governments.

== In federal government ==
The US President's veto power is defined in Article 1, Section 7 of the US Constitution. A bill that is passed by both houses of Congress is presented to the president. Presidents approve of legislation by signing it into law. If the president does not approve of the bill and chooses not to sign, they may return it unsigned, within ten days, excluding Sundays, to the house of the United States Congress in which it originated, while Congress is in session. The president is constitutionally required to state any objections to the bill in writing, and Congress is required to consider them, and to reconsider the legislation. Returning the unsigned bill to Congress constitutes a veto.

If Congress overrides the veto by a two-thirds vote in each house, it becomes law without the president's signature. Otherwise, the bill fails to become law. Historically, the Congress has overridden about 7% of presidential vetoes. The votes are made at the qualified majority of the members voting, not of the whole number of the houses' members.

A bill becomes law without the president's signature if it is not signed within the ten days allotted, provided that Congress is still in session. But if Congress adjourns before the ten days have passed during which the president might have signed the bill, then the bill fails to become law. This procedure is called a pocket veto.

=== Veto message ===
Both the president of the United States and US state governors usually issue a veto statement or veto message that provides their reasons for vetoing a measure when returning it to Congress or the state legislature, as required by the US Constitution, state constitutions, or by custom. Those statements do not have precedential value, although their reasoning may be respected within the executive branch, and can contribute to the American constitutional tradition. However, unlike a presidential signing statement, a veto statement does not carry much direct weight in the American legal system, because of its function: if Congress fails to override the veto, the bill and veto become legally irrelevant, but if the override succeeds, the veto message is not considered during subsequent executive implementation or judicial interpretation of the law.

The president or the state governor may sign the veto statement at a signing ceremony, often with media present, particularly for measures that they wish to disapprove of in a very public fashion.

=== History ===
In the Thirteen Colonies, the British colonial government exercised two forms of veto: an absolute veto exercised by the governor of each colony (except for Connecticut, Maryland, and Rhode Island), and another absolute veto exercised by the British king, typically acting through the Board of Trade. Both vetoes were absolute and derived from the monarch's power to deny royal assent. While the British monarch last used this power within the United Kingdom in 1708, in the colonies the practice continued for much longer. From 1696 to 1765, the king struck down nearly 400 laws that had been adopted by an American colonial legislature and approved by the colony's governor. This heavy use of the veto power was included in the bill of particulars in the Declaration of Independence in 1776, which states that the king "has refused his Assent to Laws, the most wholesome and necessary for the common good."

In the years immediately following independence, in the Confederation period, most state constitutions did not provide for a gubernatorial veto at all. Nationally, the President of the Continental Congress likewise lacked a veto power (although as a legislative presiding officer, the position was not completely analogous to a chief executive). There were three exceptions. South Carolina initially provided for an absolute veto, but after governor John Rutledge vetoed the new state constitution, he was forced to resign, and his successor signed a constitution that did not provide for any veto power. In Massachusetts, the constitution of 1780 provided for a qualified veto, in which a gubernatorial veto could be overridden by a two-thirds vote of each chamber of the legislature. And the 1777 New York constitution established a "Council of Revision" made up of the governor, chancellor and state Supreme Court judges, which could issue a qualified veto of legislation. The Massachusetts and New York constitutions were the only state-level vetoes at the time of the constitutional convention in 1787, and served as models for the framing of the veto power in the United States Constitution.

With the enactment of the United States Constitution (which took effect on March 4, 1789) veto power was conferred upon the President of the United States. During the Constitutional Convention, the veto was routinely referred to as a "revisionary power". The veto was constructed not as an absolute veto, but rather with limits, such as that Congress can override a veto, and that the president's objections must be stated in writing. Further, as Elbridge Gerry explained in the final days of the convention: "The primary object of the revisionary check of the President is not to protect the general interest, but to defend his own department."

During the Constitutional Convention, the framers overwhelmingly rejected three proposals for an absolute veto. They also rejected proposals for a combined judicial-executive veto along the lines of the New York constitution.

==== Under the Constitution ====
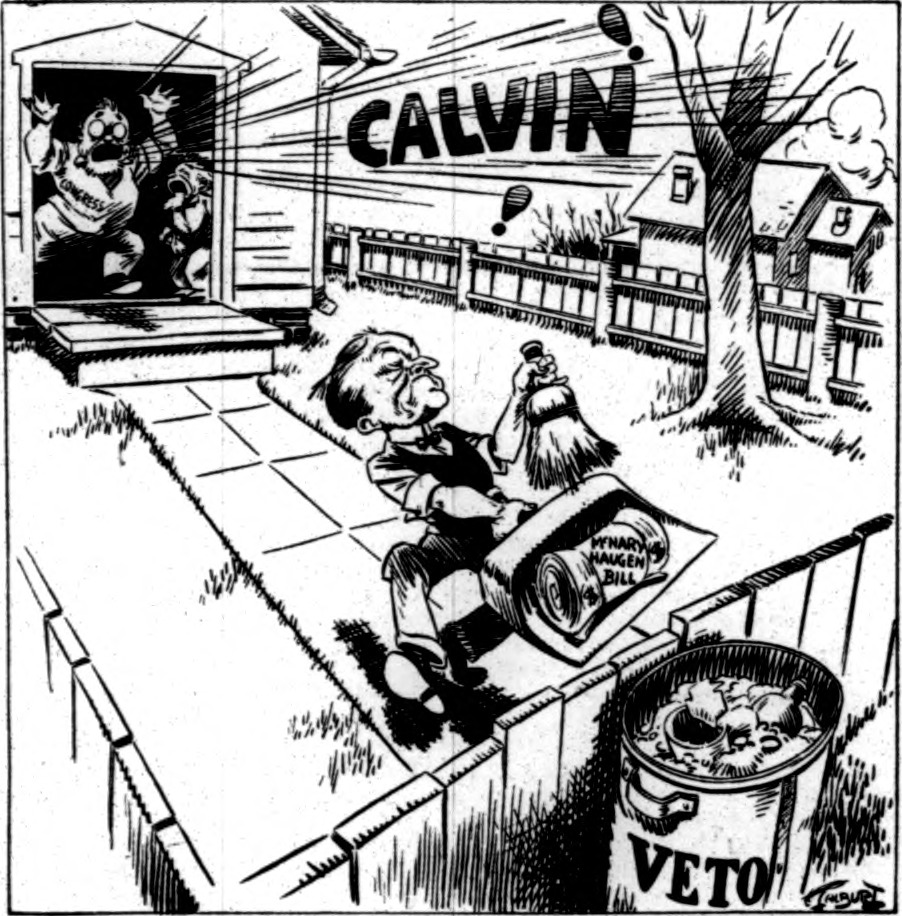
Political cartoon regarding Calvin Coolidge's veto of the McNary–Haugen Farm Relief Bill

The presidential veto power provided by the 1789 Constitution was first exercised on April 5, 1792, when President George Washington vetoed a bill outlining a new apportionment formula. Apportionment described how Congress divides seats in the House of Representatives among the states based on the US census figures. Washington's stated reasons for vetoing the bill were that it did not apportion representatives according to states' relative populations and that it gave eight states more than one representative per 30,000 residents, in violation of the Constitution.

The veto power continued to be very rarely used until the presidency of Andrew Jackson, who vetoed 12 bills. Although controversial, none of these vetoes were overridden. Congress first overrode a presidential veto on March 3, 1845, during the presidency of John Tyler.

=== Legislative veto ===
In 1983, the Supreme Court struck down the one-house legislative veto, on separation of powers grounds and on grounds that the action by one house of Congress violated the Constitutional requirement of bicameralism. The case was INS v. Chadha, concerning a foreign exchange student in Ohio who had been born in Kenya but whose parents were from India. Because he was not born in India, he was not an Indian citizen. Because his parents were not Kenyan citizens, he was not Kenyan. Thus, he had nowhere to go when his student visa expired because neither country would take him, so he overstayed his visa and was ordered to show cause why he should not be deported from the United States.

The Immigration and Nationality Act was one of many acts of Congress passed since the 1930s, which contained a provision allowing either house of that legislature to nullify decisions of agencies in the executive branch simply by passing a resolution. In this case, Chadha's deportation was suspended and the House of Representatives passed a resolution overturning the suspension, so that the deportation proceedings would continue. This, the court held, amounted to the House of Representatives passing legislation without the concurrence of the Senate, and without presenting the legislation to the president for consideration and approval (or veto). Thus, the constitutional principle of bicameralism and the separation of powers doctrine were disregarded in this case, and this legislative veto of executive decisions was struck down.

=== Line-item veto ===
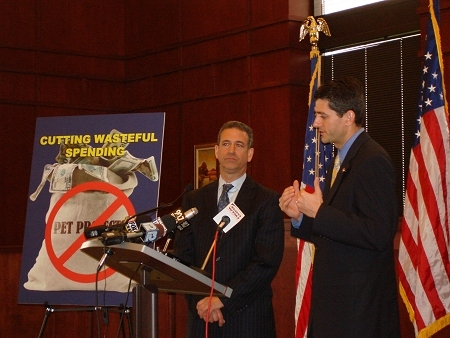
Paul Ryan and Russ Feingold introducing a line-item veto bill in 2007

In 1996, the United States Congress passed, and President Bill Clinton signed, the Line Item Veto Act of 1996. This act allowed the president to veto individual items of budgeted expenditures from appropriations bills instead of vetoing the entire bill and sending it back to Congress. However, this line-item veto was immediately challenged by members of Congress who disagreed with it. In 1998, the Supreme Court ruled 6–3 to declare the line-item veto unconstitutional. In Clinton v. City of New York (524 U.S. 417 (1998)), the court found the language of the Constitution required each bill presented to the president to be either approved or rejected as a whole. An action by which the president might pick and choose which parts of the bill to approve or not approve amounted to the president acting as a legislator instead of an executive and head of state—and particularly as a single legislator acting in place of the entire Congress—thereby violating the separation of powers doctrine. Prior to this ruling, President Clinton had applied the line-item veto to the federal budget 82 times.

In 2006, Senator Bill Frist introduced the Legislative Line Item Veto Act of 2006 in the United States Senate. Rather than provide for an actual legislative veto, however, the procedure created by the act provides that, if the president should recommend the rescission of a budgetary line item from a budget bill he previously signed into law—a power he already possesses pursuant to U.S. Const. Article II—the Congress must vote on his request within ten days. Because the legislation that is the subject of the president's request (or "special message", in the language of the bill) was already enacted and signed into law, the vote by the Congress would be ordinary legislative action, not any kind of veto—whether line-item, legislative or any other sort. The House passed this measure, but the Senate never considered it, so the bill expired and never became law.

In 2009, Senators Russ Feingold and John McCain introduced legislation of a limited version of the line-item veto. This bill would give the president the power to withdraw earmarks in new bills by sending the bill back to Congress minus the line-item vetoed earmark. Congress would then vote on the line-item vetoed bill with a majority vote under fast track rules to make any deadlines the bill had.

== In state government ==
Veto override majority required: majority of all members 3/5 majority of members present 3/5 majority of all members 2/3 majority of members present 2/3 majority of all members 2/3 majority of all legislature members combined

All US states also have a provision by which the governor can veto bills passed by the legislature. In addition to the ability to veto an entire bill as a "package", many states give the governor additional power to strike or revise parts of a bill without striking the whole bill.

=== Types of veto ===
Amendatory veto
Allows a governor to amend bills that have been passed by the legislature. Revisions are subject to confirmation or rejection by the legislature.
Line item veto
Allows a governor to remove specific sections of an appropriation bill that the legislature has passed. The legislature can override these changes. 44 governors have this power. The first state to adopt a line-item veto was Georgia, in 1861.
Pocket veto
Any bill presented to a governor after a session has ended must be signed to become law. A governor can refuse to sign such a bill and it will expire. Such vetoes cannot be overridden. The governors of 11 states and Puerto Rico have some form of pocket veto.
Reduction veto
Allows a governor to reduce the amounts budgeted for spending items. Reductions can be overridden by the legislature.
Package veto
Allows a governor to veto an entire bill. Package vetoes can be overridden by the legislature. All 50 state governors have this power. The last state to provide this power was North Carolina in 1996.

=== Authority and process by state ===
State	Veto powers					Veto override standard	Notes
State	Amendatory	Line item	Pocket	Reduction	Package	Veto override standard	Notes
Alabama	Yes	Yes	Yes	No	Yes	Majority elected	
Alaska	No	Yes	No	Yes	Yes	2/3 elected for regular bills; 3/4 elected for budget bills	Both houses meet in joint session to override veto for all bills.
Arizona	No	Yes	No	No	Yes	2/3 elected; 3/4 elected for bills modifying an initiative or referendum, bills raising taxes and bills with an emergency effective date.	
Arkansas	No	Yes	No	No	Yes	Majority elected	
California	No	Yes	No	Yes	Yes	2/3 elected	
Colorado	No	Yes	No	No	Yes	2/3 elected	
Connecticut	No	Yes	No	No	Yes	2/3 elected	
Delaware	No	Yes	Yes	No	Yes	3/5 elected	
Florida	No	Yes	No	No	Yes	2/3 present	
Georgia	No	Yes	No	No	Yes	2/3 elected	
Hawaii	No	Yes	No	Yes	Yes	2/3 elected	
Idaho	No	Yes	No	No	Yes	2/3 present	
Illinois	Yes	Yes	No	Yes	Yes	3/5 elected for package, line item, majority elected for reduction and to confirm amendatory veto.	
Indiana	No	No	No	No	Yes	Majority elected	
Iowa	No	Yes	Yes	No	Yes	2/3 elected	
Kansas	No	Yes	No	No	Yes	2/3 membership	
Kentucky	No	Yes	No	No	Yes	Majority elected	
Louisiana	No	Yes	No	No	Yes	2/3 elected	
Maine	No	Yes	Yes	Yes	Yes	2/3 elected	
Maryland	No	Yes	No	No	Yes	3/5 elected	
Massachusetts	Yes	Yes	Yes	Yes	Yes	2/3 elected for line-item, reduction, and package; normal majority for amendatory.	
Michigan	No	Yes	Yes	Yes	Yes	2/3 elected	Reduction veto must be confirmed by a majority of the appropriation committees of both houses when revenue is lower than estimated.
Minnesota	No	Yes	Yes	No	Yes	2/3 elected	
Mississippi	No	Yes	No	No	Yes	2/3 elected	
Missouri	No	Yes	No	No	Yes	2/3 elected	
Montana	Yes	Yes	No	No	Yes	2/3 present	
Nebraska	No	Yes	No	Yes	Yes	3/5 elected	
Nevada	No	No	No	No	Yes	2/3 elected	
New Hampshire	No	No	Yes	No	Yes	2/3 present	
New Jersey	Yes	Yes	No	No	Yes	2/3 elected	
New Mexico	No	Yes	No	No	Yes	2/3 present	
New York	No	Yes	Yes	No	Yes	2/3 elected	
North Carolina	No	No	No	No	Yes	3/5 present	
North Dakota	No	Yes	No	No	Yes	2/3 elected	
Ohio	No	Yes	No	No	Yes	3/5 elected	
Oklahoma	No	Yes	Yes	No	Yes	2/3 elected	
Oregon	No	Yes	No	No	Yes	2/3 present	Allows item veto of emergency effective date in all bills.
Pennsylvania	No	Yes	No	No	Yes	2/3 elected	
Rhode Island	No	No	No	No	Yes	3/5 present	
South Carolina	No	Yes	No	No	Yes	2/3 elected	
South Dakota	Partial	Yes	No	No	Yes	2/3 elected	Amendatory veto limited to "style or form" (i.e. non substantive).
Tennessee	No	Yes	No	Yes	Yes	Majority elected	
Texas	No	Yes	No	No	Yes	2/3 present	
Utah	No	Yes	No	No	Yes	2/3 elected	
Vermont	No	No	Yes	No	Yes	2/3 present	
Virginia	Yes	Yes	No	No	Yes	2/3 present including majority of elected members	
Washington	No	Yes	No	No	Yes	2/3 present	Line item veto applies to all legislation (only applies to sections, but can veto multiple appropriation items in a single section.
West Virginia	No	Yes	No	Yes	Yes	Majority elected	
Wisconsin	Partial (Note: Spending only)	Yes	Yes	Yes	Yes	2/3 present	Partial veto power allows rewriting of appropriation bills by deleting words (except by combining sentences). Cannot be used to create or raise a tax. Rewrites do not have to be approved by legislature.
Wyoming	No	Yes	No	No	Yes	2/3 elected	

== In territorial government ==
All governors of the five permanently inhabited US territories (Guam, the Commonwealth of the Northern Mariana Islands (CNMI), Puerto Rico, American Samoa, and the United States Virgin Islands (USVI)) have at least a package veto and a line-item veto. The first territorial governor to be granted line-item veto power was the governor of the Territory of Hawaii in 1902. In addition to these gubernatorial veto powers, Congress has expressly reserved the plenary power to nullify territorial legislation in some territories, including Guam, although not in Puerto Rico. Some territories' organic laws formerly provided for an absolute presidential veto over territorial legislation as well, as was the case for example in Puerto Rico under the Jones-Shafroth Act of 1917, and in the United States Virgin Islands (USVI) until 1968.

In Guam and the USVI, the territory's organic law defines the governor's veto powers. In Puerto Rico, the Commonwealth of the Northern Mariana Islands (CNMI), and American Samoa, which are governed by a constitution rather than federal statute, veto powers are defined in the constitution.

The governor of Guam has a package veto power and a line-item veto power, both of which can be overridden by a two-thirds vote of the legislature. The governor also has a pocket veto that cannot be overridden.

The governor of the CNMI has a package veto and a line-item veto over appropriation bills. The line-item veto is limited to the appropriations themselves, and does not allow the governor to strike out substantive provisions. The governor has used this power to provoke legislative change, for example in 2018 with the item veto of the Taulamwaar Sensible CNMI Cannabis Act, which included a veto of a $5 registration fee for cannabis licenses because it was too low, which led to subsequent legislation imposing a $25 fee.

The governor of Puerto Rico has a reduction veto in addition to the package and line-item vetoes. The legislature can override any of these vetoes by a two-thirds majority of each chamber. The governor has had the line-item veto since 1917. The governor also has a pocket veto, which cannot be overridden.

The governor of American Samoa has package and line-item veto powers, which the legislature can override within 14 months of the veto date. If the legislature has overridden the governor's veto, the governor can choose to forward the bill to the Secretary of the Interior for review, at which point it will only become law if the secretary approves it within 90 days. Some Samoan legislators have criticized the secretarial veto provision as a throwback to colonial government, but referendums to remove it have been repeatedly defeated, most recently in 2018. Separately from these executive veto powers, the legislature has retained a legislative veto over certain long-term leases, which the High Court of American Samoa upheld as constitutional in 1987.

The vetoes of the governor of the US Virgin Islands has a package veto power and a line-item veto power. Both can be overridden by a two-thirds vote of the legislature. The governor also has a pocket veto, which cannot be overridden. The elected governor has held the line-item veto since 1954, under the Revised Organic Act of the Virgin Islands. In 1976, the Third Circuit Court of Appeals ruled that the existing statutory language did not allow for an override. However, the organic law was amended in 1977 to allow the line-item veto to be overridden.

== In local government ==
Mayors in a mayor-council government often have a veto power over local ordinances passed by the city council. The mayoral veto is a typical feature of "strong mayor" systems in which the mayor is the chief executive and the council is limited to legislative matters. These systems are more common in large cities. The mayors of New York, Los Angeles and Chicago all have veto power, as does the mayor of Washington, D.C. The mayor of Houston, however, does not. The proportion of council votes required to override a veto is most commonly 2/3 as in the federal system, although in San Diego a 5/8 vote is required.

Nationwide, less than a third of US mayors have a veto power. In particular, veto powers are less common in council-manager governments. However, the mayor of Charlotte, who otherwise serves chiefly as a ceremonial head of government and tiebreaker on council votes, has a veto power over most city legislation. Legislation requires six votes to pass, and seven votes to override a veto. For example, in 2008 the council overrode the mayor's veto of a development project.

In the early United States, mayoral veto powers were rare, although they were granted for example to the mayor of Baltimore under the charter of 1796 and the mayor of Washington under the charter of 1802. Mayors in the early 19th century were often appointed rather than elected, and typically served one-year terms. As cities grew, the mayoral role was strengthened, becoming an independently elected office with multi-year terms, in part as an effort to limit the political power of immigrants. With this change toward a stronger mayoral role, mayoral veto powers became more common, particularly after 1850. In most cases there was a two-thirds requirement for override; however, in some cases (such as Louisville and in New York City before 1853) the mayor had only a suspensive veto that the council could override by a simple majority vote.

In addition to mayoral vetoes in cities and towns, some states also grant a veto power to the elected executive of some or all counties. Arkansas adopted a constitutional amendment in 1974 that gave all county judges a veto that can be overridden by a three-fifths majority of the quorum court. In Texas, in contrast, the county judge has no veto power, and instead votes as a member of the Commissioners' Court. In New York, counties adopting a charter may choose to have a county executive either with or without veto power. Wisconsin granted a veto to county executives by constitutional amendment in 1962, although as of 2020, this applies only to twelve counties that have adopted a county executive form of government. Likewise in California, elected county executives have a veto, but only the consolidated city-county of San Francisco has an elected executive. And in some states, such as Iowa since 1981, counties can adopt an elected-executive system with a veto power, but none have done so.

== In tribal government ==
The constitutions of many Native American tribes contain an executive veto power over bills passed by the tribal council. For example, the chairperson of the Little Traverse Bay Bands of Odawa Indians has a veto power, including over budgetary matters. Some constitutions give the executive the power to refer a law to a referendum rather than to veto it directly.

In the Navajo Nation government, the president has a package veto power as well as a line-item veto for budgetary matters. The line-item veto cannot be overridden, under the terms of a 2009 referendum. The package veto was notably used by President Kelsey Begaye in 2001 to force a compromise on a law that allowed gaming on Navajo Nation land, after the council failed to override the veto.

In addition, some tribal constitutions adopted under the Indian Reorganization Act of 1934 give the Secretary of the Interior a veto power over tribal legislation. The Nisqually Indian Tribe of the Nisqually Reservation constitution grants a secretarial veto over all ordinances issued under its police power. This has sometimes caused difficulties for tribal governments. From 1975 to 2021, the "Morton memorandum" directed all BIA superintendents and area directors to disapprove any tribal legislation regulating water use on Indian reservations that required secretarial approval under tribal law. Thus, tribes without such provisions in their constitutions could regulate water use, but those whose constitutions granted a secretarial veto faced an additional obstacle to doing so. Some tribes have amended their constitutions to eliminate the secretarial veto, as the Citizen Potawatomi Nation did in 2007.

== See also ==
- Legislative veto in the United States
- Line-item veto
- Pocket veto
