= Powers of the president of the United States =

The powers of the president of the United States include those explicitly granted by Article II of the United States Constitution as well as those granted by Acts of Congress, implied powers, and also a great deal of soft power that is attached to the presidency.

The Constitution explicitly assigns to the president the power to sign or veto legislation, command the armed forces, ask for the written opinion of their Cabinet, convene or adjourn Congress, grant reprieves and pardons, and receive ambassadors. The president takes care that the laws are faithfully executed and has the power to appoint and remove executive officers. As a result of these two powers, the president can direct officials on how to interpret the law (subject to judicial review) and on staffing and personnel decisions. The president may also appoint Article III judges and some officers with the advice and consent of the Senate. In the condition of a Senate recess, the president may make a temporary appointment.

The president also has the power to make treaties, which need to be ratified by two-thirds of the Senate, and is accorded those foreign affairs functions not otherwise granted to Congress or shared with the Senate. Thus, the president can control the formation and communication of foreign policy and can direct the nation's diplomatic corps.

== Commander-in-chief ==
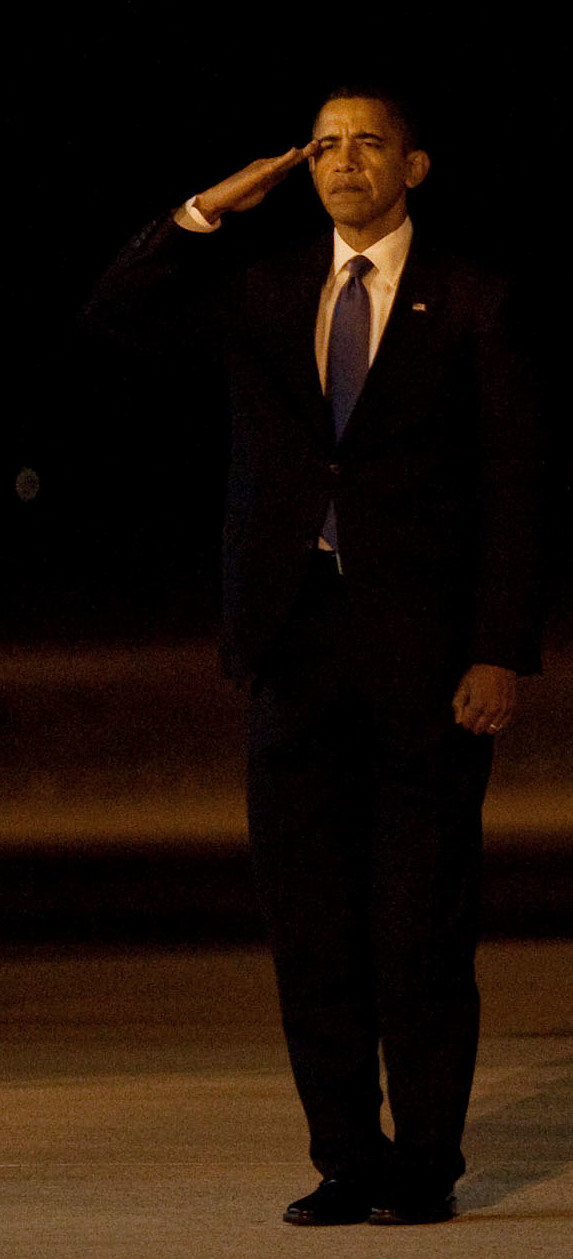
President Barack Obama, in his capacity as commander-in-chief, salutes the caskets of 18 individual soldiers killed in Afghanistan in 2009.

The president is the commander-in-chief of the United States Armed Forces as well as all federalized United States Militia and may exercise supreme operational command and control over them. The president has, in this capacity, plenary power to launch, direct and supervise military operations, order or authorize the deployment of troops, unilaterally launch nuclear weapons, and form military policy with the Department of Defense and Homeland Security. However, the constitutional ability to declare war is vested only in Congress.

Article II of the U.S. Constitution expressly designates the president as:

Commander in Chief of the Army and Navy of the United States, and of the Militia of the several States, when called into the actual Service of the United States

U.S. ranks have their roots in British military traditions, with the president possessing ultimate authority, but no rank, maintaining a civilian status. Before 1947, the president was the only common superior of the Army (under the secretary of war) and the Navy and Marine Corps (under the secretary of the Navy). The National Security Act of 1947, and the 1949 amendments to the same act, created the Department of Defense and the services (Army, Navy, Marine Corps and Air Force) became subject to the "authority, direction and control" of the secretary of defense. The present-day operational command of the Armed Forces is delegated from the president to the Department of Defense and is normally exercised through its secretary. The chairman of the Joint Chiefs of Staff and the combatant commands assist with operations as outlined in the presidentially-approved Unified Command Plan (UCP).

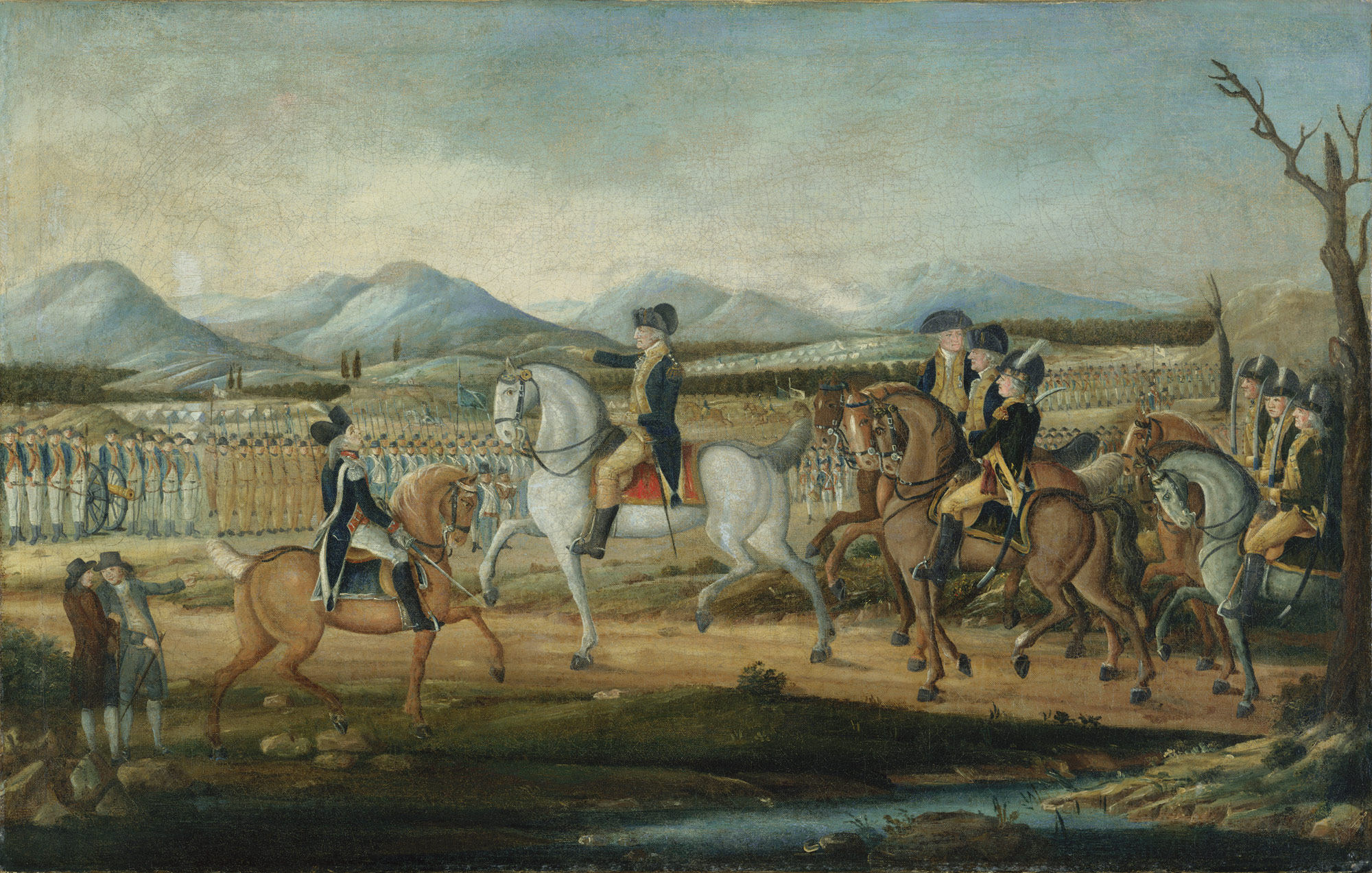
A painting depicting president George Washington and his troops before their march to suppress the Whiskey Rebellion in 1794

The exact degree of authority that the Constitution grants to the president as commander-in-chief has been the subject of much debate throughout American history, with Congress at various times granting the president wide authority and at others attempting to restrict that authority. There is consensus that the framers of the Constitution intended Congress to declare war and the president to direct the war; Alexander Hamilton said that the president, although lacking the power to declare war, would have "the direction of war when authorized or begun", further explaining in Federalist No. 69 that "The President is to be commander-in-chief of the army and navy of the United States. ... It would amount to nothing more than the supreme command and direction of the military and naval forces ... while that of the British king extends to the DECLARING of war and to the RAISING and REGULATING of fleets and armies, all [of] which ... would appertain to the legislature".

Pursuant to the War Powers Resolution of 1973, Congress must authorize any troop deployments that continue longer than 60 days, although that process relies on triggering mechanisms that have never been employed, rendering it ineffectual. Additionally, Congress provides a check to presidential military power through its control over military spending and regulation. Presidents have historically initiated the process for going to war, but critics have charged that there have been several conflicts in which presidents did not get official declarations, including Theodore Roosevelt's military move into Panama in 1903, the Korean War, the Vietnam War, and the invasions of Grenada in 1983 and Panama in 1989. U.S. involvement in the 2026 Iran war brought renewed efforts to invoke the War Powers Resolution.

The amount of military detail handled personally by the president in wartime has varied dramatically. George Washington, the first U.S. president, firmly established military subordination under civilian authority. In 1794, Washington used his constitutional powers to assemble 12,000 militiamen to quell the Whiskey Rebellion—a conflict in western Pennsylvania involving armed farmers and distillers who refused to pay excise tax on spirits. According to historian Joseph Ellis, this was the "first and only time a sitting American president led troops in the field", although James Madison briefly took control of artillery units in the defense of Washington D.C. during the War of 1812.

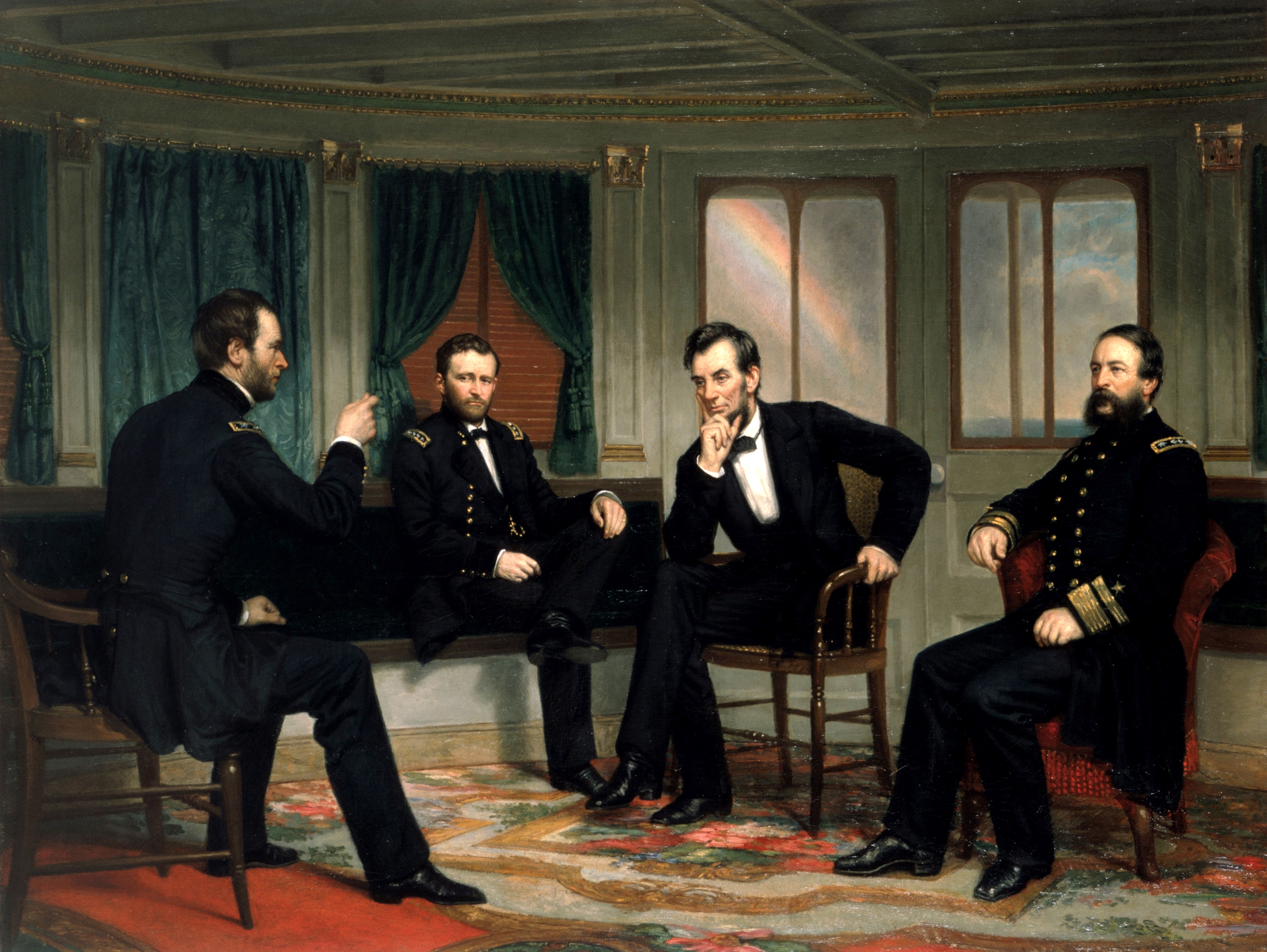
President Abraham Lincoln advising with his Generals during the American Civil War

President Abraham Lincoln was deeply involved in strategy development and day-to-day military operations during the American Civil War, 1861–1865; historians have given Lincoln high praise for his strategic sense and his ability to select and encourage commanders such as Ulysses S. Grant. On the other extreme, Woodrow Wilson paid very little attention to operational military details of World War I and had very little contact with the War Department or with General John J. Pershing, who had a high degree of autonomy as commander of the armies in France. As president during World War II, Franklin D. Roosevelt worked closely with his generals and admirals, and assigned Admiral William D. Leahy as "Chief of Staff to the Commander in Chief". Harry S. Truman believed in a high amount of civilian leadership of the military, making many tactical and policy decisions based on the recommendations of his advisors—including the decision to use atomic weapons on Japan, to commit American forces in the Korean War, and to terminate Douglas MacArthur from his command. Lyndon B. Johnson kept a very tight personal control of operations during the Vietnam War, which some historians have sharply criticized.

The Iraqi invasion of Kuwait in 1990 and the ensuing Gulf War in 1991 saw George H. W. Bush assemble and lead one of the largest military coalitions of nations in modern times. Confronting a major constitutional issue of murky legislation that left the wars in Korea and Vietnam without official declarations of war, Congress quickly authorized sweeping war-making powers for Bush. The leadership of George W. Bush during the war in Afghanistan and Iraq War achieved mixed results. In the aftermath of the September 11 attacks by al-Qaeda, the subsequent war on terror that followed, and the 2003 invasion of Iraq due to Iraq's alleged sponsorship of terrorism and possession of weapons of mass destruction, the speed at which the Taliban and Ba'ath Party governments in both Kabul and Baghdad were toppled by an overwhelming superiority of American and allied forces defied the predictions of many military experts. However, insufficient post-war planning and strategy by Bush and his advisors to rebuild those nations were costly.

During the 20th century, certain regional commanders came to be called "commander-in-chief". Before 2002, combatant commanders were referred to as commanders-in-chief on a daily basis (e.g. Commander in Chief of the U.S. Central Command), even though the positions were in fact already statutorily designated as "combatant commander" (CCDR). On 24 October 2002, Defense Secretary Donald H. Rumsfeld announced his decision that the use of the commander-in-chief title would thereafter be reserved for the president only.

As the purpose of a military is to combat foreign invaders and adversaries, U.S. troops cannot be deployed on U.S. soil. There is only one exception to this rule: if the president invokes the Insurrection Act of 1807 to quell civil turmoils, rebellions and insurrections.

The president can – with certain limitations – call into federal service all or individual units of the National Guards and naval militias of the states to either supplement regular forces, assist state governments in the case of rebellion or insurrection, or to enforce federal law when such enforcement is impracticable by normal means. Additionally, the president also maintains direct control over the District of Columbia National Guard. As opposed to military forces, militia units can operate on American soil.

In times of war or national emergency, the Congress may grant the president broader powers to manage the national economy and protect the security of the United States, but these powers were not expressly granted by the Constitution.

== Executive powers ==
Suffice it to say that the President is made the sole repository of the executive powers of the United States, and the powers entrusted to him as well as the duties imposed upon him are awesome indeed.

— Nixon v. General Services Administration, 433 U.S. 425 (1977) (Rehnquist, J., dissenting)

Within the executive branch itself, the president has broad powers to manage national affairs and the priorities of the government. The president can unilaterally issue a variety of rules, regulations, and instructions, whose impact and visibility vary widely. Memoranda and other informal orders may not be published. National security directives may be classified. Public proclamations and international agreements are more easily tracked, as are executive orders, which have the binding force of law upon federal agencies but do not require approval of the United States Congress.

Early examples of unilateral directives to enact politically controversial policies include George Washington's Proclamation of Neutrality (1793), Andrew Jackson's Nullification Proclamation (1832), and Abraham Lincoln's Emancipation Proclamation (1862).

The Budget and Accounting Act of 1921 put additional responsibilities on the presidency for the preparation of the United States federal budget, although Congress was required to approve it. The act required the Office of Management and Budget to assist the president with the preparation of the budget. Previous presidents had the privilege of impounding funds as they saw fit, however the United States Supreme Court revoked the privilege in 1998 as a violation of the Presentment Clause. The power was available to all presidents and was regarded as a power inherent to the office. The Congressional Budget and Impoundment Control Act of 1974 was passed in response to large-scale power exercises by President Nixon. The act also created the Congressional Budget Office as a legislative counterpoint to the Office of Management and Budget.

Executive orders are subject to judicial review and interpretation. Nonetheless, acting independently, a president can heavily influence and redirect the nation's political agenda and reshape its public policies. As early as 1999, Terry M. Moe and William G. Howell suggested that presidential capacity to pursue objectives unilaterally, rather than through Congress, "virtually defines what is distinctively modern about the modern American presidency." This shift can be linked to other changes, in particular the polarization of political parties, increasing tendencies for congressional dysfunction, and the delegation of authority to the executive branch to implement legislative provisions.

== Powers related to legislation ==
The president has several options when presented with a bill from Congress. If the president agrees with the bill, he can sign it into law within ten days of receipt. If the president opposes the bill, he can veto it and return the bill to Congress with a veto message suggesting changes (unless Congress is out of session, in which case the president may rely on a pocket veto).

Presidents are required to approve all of a bill or none of it; selective vetoes have been prohibited. In 1996, Congress gave President Bill Clinton a line-item veto over parts of a bill that required spending federal funds. The Supreme Court, in Clinton v. New York City, found Clinton's veto of pork-barrel appropriations for New York City to be unconstitutional because only a constitutional amendment could give the president line-item veto power.

When a bill is presented for signature, the president may also issue a signing statement with expressions of their opinion on the constitutionality of a bill's provisions. The president may even declare them unenforceable but the Supreme Court has yet to address this issue.

Congress may override vetoes with a two-thirds vote in both the House and the Senate. The process is inherently difficult and relatively rare. The threat of a presidential veto has usually provided sufficient pressure for Congress to modify a bill so the president would be willing to sign it.

Much of the legislation dealt with by Congress is drafted at the initiative of the executive branch. In modern times, the "executive communication" has become a prolific source of legislative proposals. The communication is usually in the form of a message or letter from a member of the president's Cabinet, the head of an independent agency, or the president himself, transmitting a draft of a proposed bill to the speaker of the House of Representatives and the president of the Senate. The president may personally propose legislation in annual and special messages to Congress including the annual State of the Union address and joint sessions of Congress. If Congress has adjourned without acting on proposals, the president may call a special session of the Congress.

Beyond these official powers, the U.S. president, as a leader of his political party and the United States government, holds great sway over public opinion whereby they may influence legislation. Legislation might have to follow up assertive executive actions in order to validate them.

To improve the working relationship with Congress, presidents in recent years have set up an Office of Legislative Affairs. Presidential aides have kept abreast of all important legislative activities.

== Powers of appointment ==
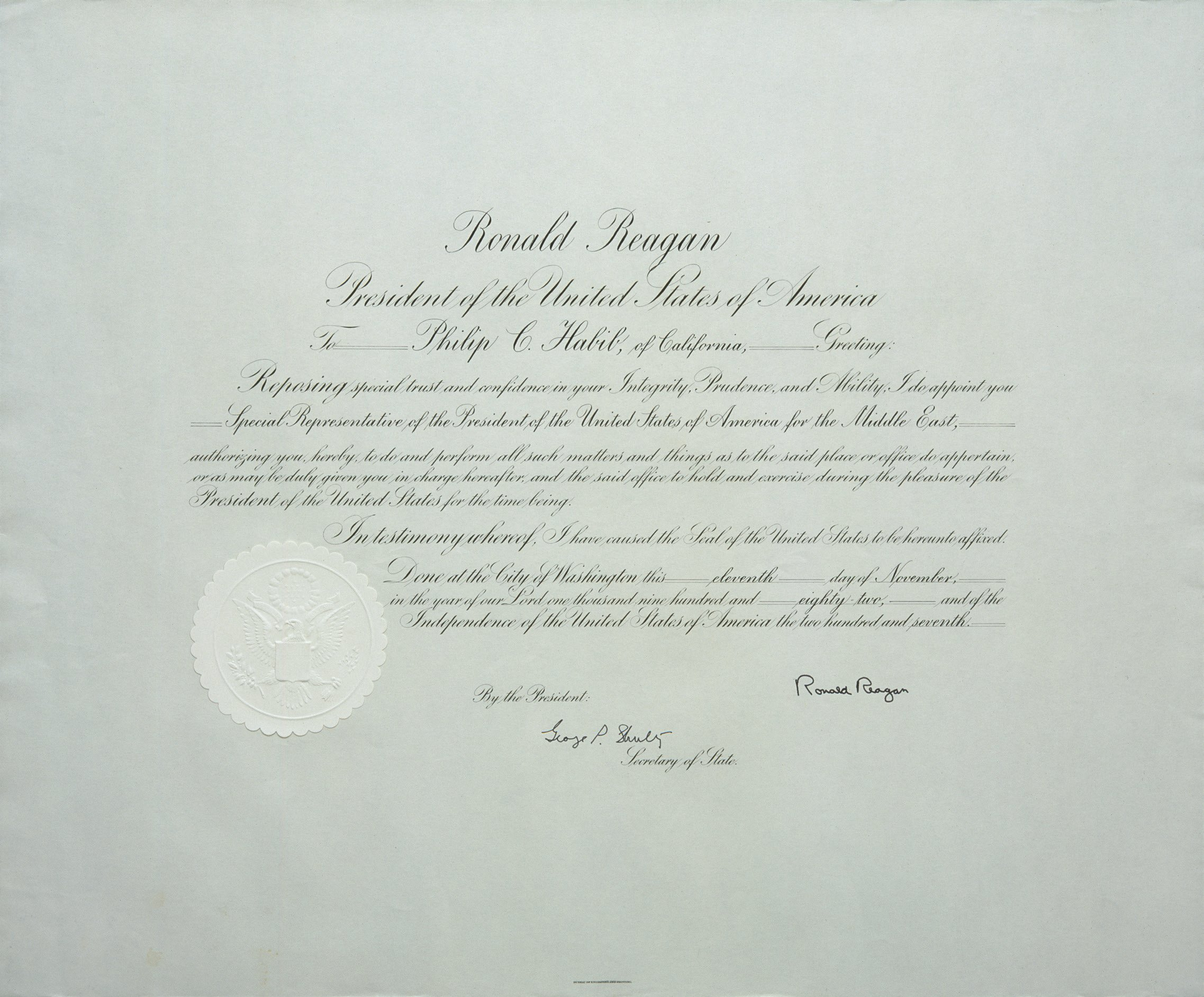
Many appointments are made by commission under the Great Seal

After winning election to office, the president-elect and his transition team must begin the selection process for nominees to more than 6,000 federal positions, who will be appointed after inauguration. The appointments range from top officials at U.S. government agencies, to the White House staff, and members of the United States diplomatic corps. Many, but not all, of these positions at the highest levels are appointed by the president with the advice and consent of the United States Senate.

The president also nominates persons to fill federal judicial vacancies, including federal judges, such as members of the United States courts of appeals and the U.S. Supreme Court. These nominations require Senate confirmation, and this can provide a major stumbling block for presidents who wish to shape the federal judiciary in a particular ideological stance.

As head of the executive branch, the president appoints the top officials for nearly all federal agencies. These positions are listed in the Plum Book which outlines more than 7,000 appointive positions in the government. Many of these appointments are made by the president. The president is also free to appoint a new agency head of ten agencies. For example, it is not unusual for the CIA's director or NASA's administrator to be changed by the president. Other agencies that deal with federal regulation such as the Federal Reserve Board or the Securities and Exchange Commission have set terms that will often outlast presidential terms. For example, governors of the Federal Reserve serve for fourteen years to ensure agency independence. The president also appoints members to the boards of directors for government-owned corporations, such as Amtrak. The president can also make a recess appointment if a position needs to be filled while Congress is not in session.

In the past, presidents could appoint members of the United States civil service. This use of the spoils system allowed presidents to reward political supporters with jobs. Following the assassination of President James Garfield by Charles J. Guiteau, a disgruntled office seeker, Congress instituted a merit-based civil service in which positions are filled on a nonpartisan basis. The Office of Personnel Management now oversees the staffing of 2.8 million federal jobs in the federal bureaucracy. In 2020, the Trump administration attempted to partially override this change via Executive Order, creating the job classification of Schedule F appointments. The Biden administration removed the classification prior to its full implementation.

The president must also appoint his staff of aides, advisers, and assistants. These individuals are political appointments and are not subject to review by the Senate. All members of the staff serve "at the pleasure of the President". Since 1995, the president has been required to submit an annual report to Congress listing the name and salary of every employee of the White House Office. The 2011 report listed 454 employees.

== Executive clemency ==
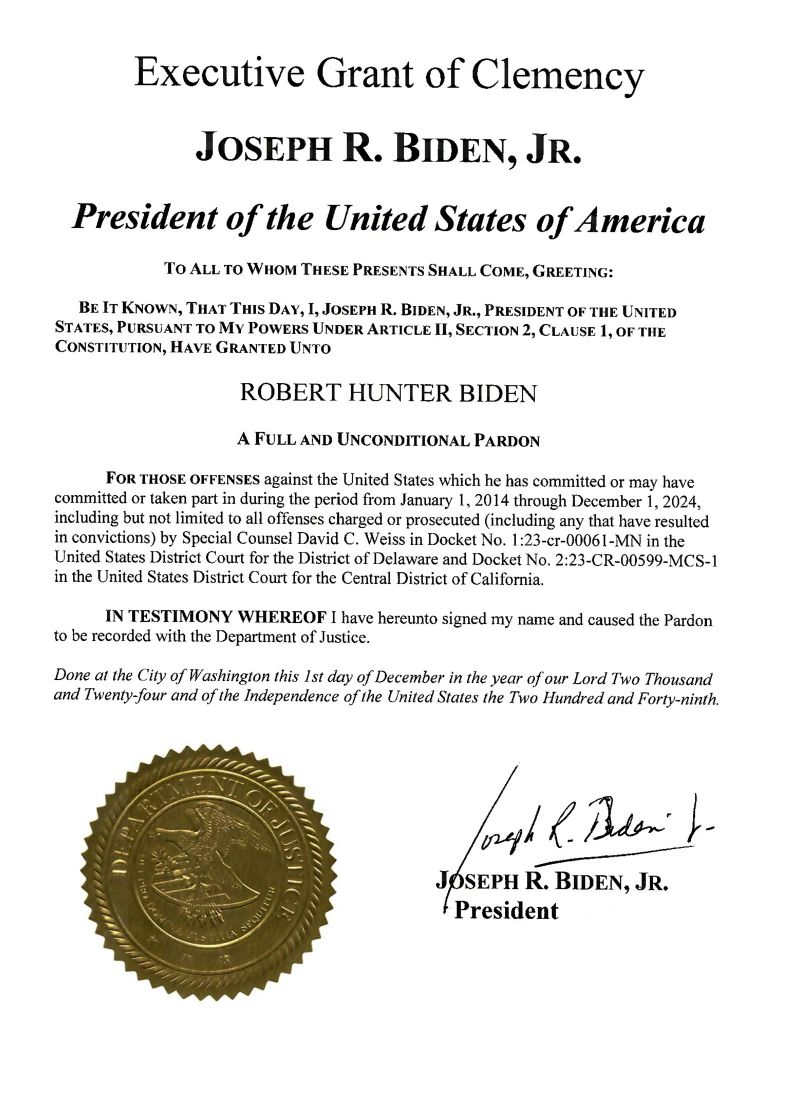
A pardon, signed by the president and sealed with the seal of the Department of Justice

Article II of the United States Constitution gives the president the power of clemency. The two most commonly used clemency powers are those of pardon and commutation. A pardon is an official forgiveness for an acknowledged crime. Once a pardon is issued, all punishment for the crime is waived. A person seeking executive clemency by pardon, reprieve, commutation of sentence, or remission of fine shall execute a formal petition. The petition shall be addressed to the president of the United States and shall be submitted to the pardon attorney, Department of Justice, Washington, D.C. 20530, except for petitions relating to military offenses. A person accepting the pardon through execution of a formal petition must, however, acknowledge that the crime did take place. The president can only grant pardons for federal offenses. The president maintains the Office of the Pardon Attorney in the U.S. Department of Justice to review all requests for pardons. The president can also commute a sentence which, in effect, changes the punishment to time served. While the guilty party may be released from custody or not have to serve out a prison term, all other punishments still apply.

Most pardons are issued as oversight of the judicial branch, especially in cases where the Federal Sentencing Guidelines are considered too severe. This power can check the legislative and judicial branches by altering punishment for crimes. Presidents can issue blanket amnesty to forgive entire groups of people. For example, President Jimmy Carter granted amnesty to Vietnam draft dodgers who had fled to Canada. Presidents can also issue temporary suspensions of prosecution or punishment in the form of respites. This power is most commonly used to delay federal sentences of execution.

Pardons can be controversial for several reasons. President George W. Bush commuted the sentence of White House staffer Lewis "Scooter" Libby, President Donald Trump commuted the sentence of and later pardoned Roger Stone, and President Joe Biden pardoned his son, Hunter Biden.

== Foreign affairs ==
Under the Constitution, the president is the federal official that is primarily responsible for the relations of the United States with foreign nations. The president appoints ambassadors, ministers, and consuls (subject to confirmation by the Senate) and receives foreign ambassadors and other public officials. With the secretary of state, the president manages all official contacts with foreign governments.

On occasion, the president may personally participate in summit conferences where heads of state meet for direct consultation. For example, President Wilson led the American delegation to the Paris Peace Conference in 1919 after World War I; President Franklin D. Roosevelt met with Allied leaders during World War II; and every president sits down with world leaders to discuss economic and political issues and to reach agreements.

Through the Department of State and the Department of Defense, the president is responsible for the protection of Americans abroad and of foreign nationals in the United States. The president decides whether to recognize new nations and new governments, and negotiate treaties with other nations, which become binding on the United States when approved by two-thirds of the Senate. The president may also negotiate executive agreements with foreign powers that are not subject to Senate confirmation.

== Emergency powers ==
The Constitution does not expressly grant the president additional powers in times of national emergency. Some scholars think that the Framers implied these powers because the structural design of the Executive Branch enables it to act faster than the Legislative Branch. Because the Constitution remains silent on the issue, the courts cannot grant the Executive Branch these powers when it tries to wield them. The courts will only recognize a right of the Executive Branch to use emergency powers if Congress has granted such powers to the president.

Emergency presidential power is not a new idea. However, the way in which it is used in the twenty-first century presents new challenges.

A claim of emergency powers was at the center of President Abraham Lincoln's suspension of habeas corpus without Congressional approval in 1861. Lincoln claimed that the rebellion created an emergency that permitted him the extraordinary power of unilaterally suspending the writ. With Chief Justice Roger Taney sitting as judge, the Federal District Court of Maryland struck down the suspension in Ex parte Merryman, although Lincoln ignored the order.

President Franklin Delano Roosevelt similarly invoked emergency powers when he issued an order directing that all Japanese Americans residing on the West Coast be placed into internment camps during World War II. The U.S. Supreme Court upheld this order in Korematsu v. United States.

Harry Truman declared the use of emergency powers when he nationalized private steel mills that failed to produce steel because of a labor strike in 1952. With the Korean War ongoing, Truman asserted that he could not wage war successfully if the economy failed to provide him with the material resources necessary to keep the troops well-equipped. The U.S. Supreme Court, however, refused to accept that argument in Youngstown Sheet & Tube Co. v. Sawyer, voting 6-3 that neither commander-in-chief powers nor any claimed emergency powers gave the president the authority to unilaterally seize private property without Congressional legislation.

President Nixon claimed in 1976 that the powers of the president to decide the constitutionality of government actions concerning national security was absolute and exclusive: "if the President does it, that means it is not illegal".

Congressional legislation gives the president powers to commandeer states and governors of states, if the president deems they are engaged in insurrection.

According to research conducted by the Brennan Center at New York University Law School, administrations since Eisenhower have drafted secret Presidential Emergency Action Documents (PEADs) that assert what one government document described as "extraordinary presidential authority in response to extraordinary situations." These secret powers appear to be exempt from congressional oversight. PEADs undergo periodic revision, and although their current contents were not known as of 2020, previous PEADs included emergency powers to detain "alien enemies" and other "dangerous persons"; invoke various forms of martial law; authorize a general warrant permitting search and seizure of persons and property; suspend production of the Federal Register; and censor news reports. The Brennan Center found that 56 PEADs were in effect as of 2018.

== Executive privilege ==
Executive privilege gives the president the ability to withhold information from the public, Congress, and the courts in national security and diplomatic affairs. George Washington first claimed privilege when Congress requested to see Chief Justice John Jay's notes from an unpopular treaty negotiation with Great Britain. While not enshrined in the Constitution, Washington's action created the precedent for privilege. When Richard Nixon tried to use executive privilege as a reason for not turning over subpoenaed audio tapes to a special prosecutor in the Watergate scandal, the Supreme Court ruled in United States v. Nixon that privilege was not absolute. The Court reasoned that the judiciary's interest in the "fair administration of criminal justice" outweighed President Nixon's interest in keeping the evidence secret. Later President Bill Clinton lost in federal court when he tried to assert privilege in the Clinton–Lewinsky scandal. The Supreme Court affirmed this in Clinton v. Jones, which denied the use of privilege in cases of civil suits.

== Constraints on presidential power ==
Because of the vast array of presidential roles and responsibilities, coupled with a conspicuous presence on the national and international scene, political analysts have tended to place great emphasis on the president's powers. Some have even spoken of "the imperial presidency", referring to the expanded role of the office that Franklin D. Roosevelt maintained during his term.

President Theodore Roosevelt famously called the presidency a "bully pulpit" from which to raise issues nationally, for when a president raises an issue, it inevitably becomes subject to public debate. A president's power and influence may have limits, but politically the president is certainly the most important power in Washington and, furthermore, is one of the most famous and influential of all Americans.

Though constrained by various other laws passed by Congress, the president's executive branch conducts most foreign policy, and their power to order and direct troops as commander-in-chief is quite significant (the exact limits of a president's military powers without Congressional authorization are open to debate).

The Separation of Powers devised by the founding fathers was primarily designed to prevent the majority from ruling with an iron fist. Based on their experience, the framers shied away from giving any branch of the new government too much power. The separation of powers provides a system of shared power known as "checks and balances". For example, the president appoints judges and departmental secretaries, but these appointments must be approved by the Senate. The president can approve bills or veto (deny) them. If he does that, the bill is sent back to Congress, which can override the veto.

An essential factor, then, to counter the abuse of unilateral executive power, is presidential accountability:

[T]he American Constitution...envisages a strong Presidency within an equally strong system of accountability. When the constitutional balance is upset in favor of Presidential power and at the expense of Presidential accountability, the office can be said to become imperial. – Arthur M. Schlesinger Jr.

Political scientists have attempted to develop theoretical approaches to describe the use and control of unilateral power, but such theories have not been clearly substantiated by empirical evidence. Some theoretical perspectives emphasize the importance of institutional constraints and the separation of powers. Unilateral action can be seen as a strategic way of circumventing Congressional authority, or as a way to act complicitly with the tacit approval of the majority party. Other formal theories focus on agency and relationships between the president, other bureaucratic actors, and the public. Comparative perspectives suggest that factors such as partisan support, ideological polarization, and divided government, may be closely linked to unilateral policy making. No one theoretical approach addresses all important issues.

Empirical research on executive power and its uses is limited, and results are not always consistent. Available results may not align with predictions from separation-of-powers theories: "presidents routinely change status quo policies that theories predict they should not." Evidence suggests that presidents are more likely to exercise unilateral power with the tacit support of the majority party in Congress, rather than against a hostile Congress.

With respect to judicial review it appears that presidents may be more likely to issue executive orders when they differ ideologically from the courts. However the courts overwhelmingly tend to support such directives, upholding 83% of the executive orders that were challenged in federal court between 1942 and 1998.

Predictions about the relationship between presidential popularity and numbers of unilateral directives issued are inconclusive. It has been theorized that less popular presidents will issue more presidential directives, but results on this question are mixed. In terms of how the public responds to the president's actions, there is some evidence to suggest that "individuals are less likely to approve of the president following the use of unilateral power" possibly because it is used in place of legislation.

Asked about "any limits on his global powers", President Trump said "Yeah, there is one thing. My own morality. My own mind. It’s the only thing that can stop me."

== See also ==
- Abuse of power
- Color of law
- Fourth branch of government
- Madisonian Model
- Separation of powers under the United States Constitution
- Unitary executive theory
- Powers of the prime minister of the United Kingdom
- Presidential immunity in the United States
- Imperial Presidency
- Democratic backsliding in the United States
- United States and the International Criminal Court
