= Self-executing rule =

Procedural measure used by the United States Congress

The self-executing rule, also known as "deem and pass" is a resolution that a bill be deemed to have passed (or, more commonly, a resolution that a bill be deemed to have passed with a certain amendment); if the resolution passes, the bill is automatically deemed to have passed with the amendment set forth in the resolution itself. This procedural measure has been used by the United States Congress to approve a legislative rule that contains such a provision, the House of Representatives then deems a second piece of legislation as approved without requiring a separate vote, as long as it is specified in the rule. That is, if the vote on the rule passes, then the second piece of legislation is passed as part of the rule vote.

When considering a bill for debate, the House must first adopt a "special rule" for the debate as proposed by the House Rules Committee. The special rule is a resolution which specifies which issues or bills are to be considered by the House, how much time allotted for debate on such matters, and which proposed amendments will be allowed to be voted on. If the House votes to approve a rule that contains a self-executing provision, it simultaneously agrees to dispose of the separate matter as specified by the rule. For example, modifications or amendments can be approved while the underlying bill is also approved at the same time.

The procedure is often used to streamline the legislative process, although some legal scholars question whether the process is constitutional.

== Uses ==
The first use of the self-executing rule, then known as a "deeming resolution," was in 1933.

From the 95th to the 98th Congresses (1977–1984) the self-executing rule was used eight times; it was then used 20 times under House Speaker Tip O’Neill (D) in the 99th Congress, and 18 times under Speaker Jim Wright (D) in the 100th. Under Speaker Newt Gingrich (R) there were 38 self-executing rules in the 104th Congress and 52 in the 105th (1995–1998). Under Speaker Dennis Hastert (R) there were 40 self-executing rules in the 106th Congress, 42 in the 107th and 30 in the 108th (1999–2007).

In March 2010, the procedure was one option considered, but then rejected, by Speaker Nancy Pelosi (D) and congressional Democrats to pass the Reconciliation Act of 2010 (H.R. 4872) and the Patient Protection and Affordable Care Act (H.R. 3590), as part of President Obama's health care reform initiative.

== Legal arguments ==
Some analysts have questioned the constitutionality of the self-executing rule. Some lawyers and public advocacy groups cite the 1998 Supreme Court case Clinton v. City of New York relating to the line item veto, and the 1983 case Immigration and Naturalization Service v. Chadha 462 U.S. 919 (1983) relating to the legislative veto to support these claims. Others point to a 2006 case before the United States District Court for the District of Columbia regarding the Deficit Reduction Act, which, in part, ruled in favor of the self-executing provision. That ruling was upheld on appeal in 2007, but was never argued before the Supreme Court.

== See also ==
- Standing Rules of the United States House of Representatives
- Suspension of the rules in the United States Congress
