= Line-item veto in the United States =

Practice ruled unconstitutional for the President but allowed for some state governors

In United States government, the line-item veto, or partial veto, is the power of an executive authority to nullify or cancel specific provisions of a bill, usually a budget appropriations bill, without vetoing the entire legislative package. The line-item vetoes are usually subject to the possibility of legislative override as are traditional vetoes.

== Governors ==
Forty-four of the 50 U.S. states give their governors some form of line-item veto power; Indiana, Nevada, New Hampshire, North Carolina, Rhode Island, and Vermont are the exceptions. The Mayor of Washington, D.C., also has this power.

=== Wisconsin ===
The Governor of Wisconsin is empowered with a sweeping line-item veto. Wisconsin governors have the power to strike out words, numbers, and even entire sentences from appropriations bills.

According to scholars, Wisconsin has used four types of extraordinary partial vetoes. The first, the "digit veto", was first used by Governor Patrick Lucey in 1973. In appropriation for $25 million, he vetoed the digit 2, resulting in an appropriation of $5 million. Just two years later, Lucey introduced the "editing veto". In this instance, the word "not" was removed in the phrase "not less than 50 percent", thus resulting in the opposite effect than desired by the legislature. In 1983, an even more extreme version, the "pick-a-letter" or "Vanna White veto" was introduced. Governor Anthony Earl edited a 121-word, five-sentence paragraph down to a one-sentence, 22-word paragraph to change an appeals process from the courts to the Public Service Commission. The final version, the "reduction veto", was introduced in 1993 by Governor Tommy Thompson. This resulted in a legislatively-appropriated amount being reduced arbitrarily by the governor. This unprecedented usage has resulted in eight lawsuits and numerous amendment proposals. In the first lawsuit, State ex. rel. Wisconsin Telephone Co. v. Henry, the Wisconsin Supreme Court recognized the absolute partial veto power of the Governor as long as a workable, complete law remained, stating the governor had "the right to pass independently on every separable piece of legislation in an appropriation bill."

In his first two terms as governor, Thompson used 1,500 line-item vetoes to cancel a total of $150 million in spending; none of these vetoes were overridden. The only judicial limitation was Risser v. Klauser, which prohibited the "reduction veto", stating that "the constitution prohibits a write-in veto of monetary figures which are not appropriation amounts." In 1990, a constitutional amendment was passed abolishing the "Vanna White veto," which allowed the governor to strike individual letters within words to create new words. Yet, in 2011, Governor Scott Walker controversially crossed out 116 words in a pension-related section of the budget bill.

In 2023, Governor Tony Evers used a line-item veto to extend what was supposed to be a two year temporary funding increase for schools to last over 400 years. In 2025, the Wisconsin Supreme Court upheld the veto.

== Confederate States ==
Article 1, Section 7 of the Constitution of the Confederate States, adopted just before the start of the American Civil War, would have granted the President of the Confederate States the ability to "approve any appropriation and disapprove any other appropriation in the same bill," with such disapprovals returned to the Houses of Congress for reconsideration and potentially for override.

== Line-Item Veto Act of 1996 ==
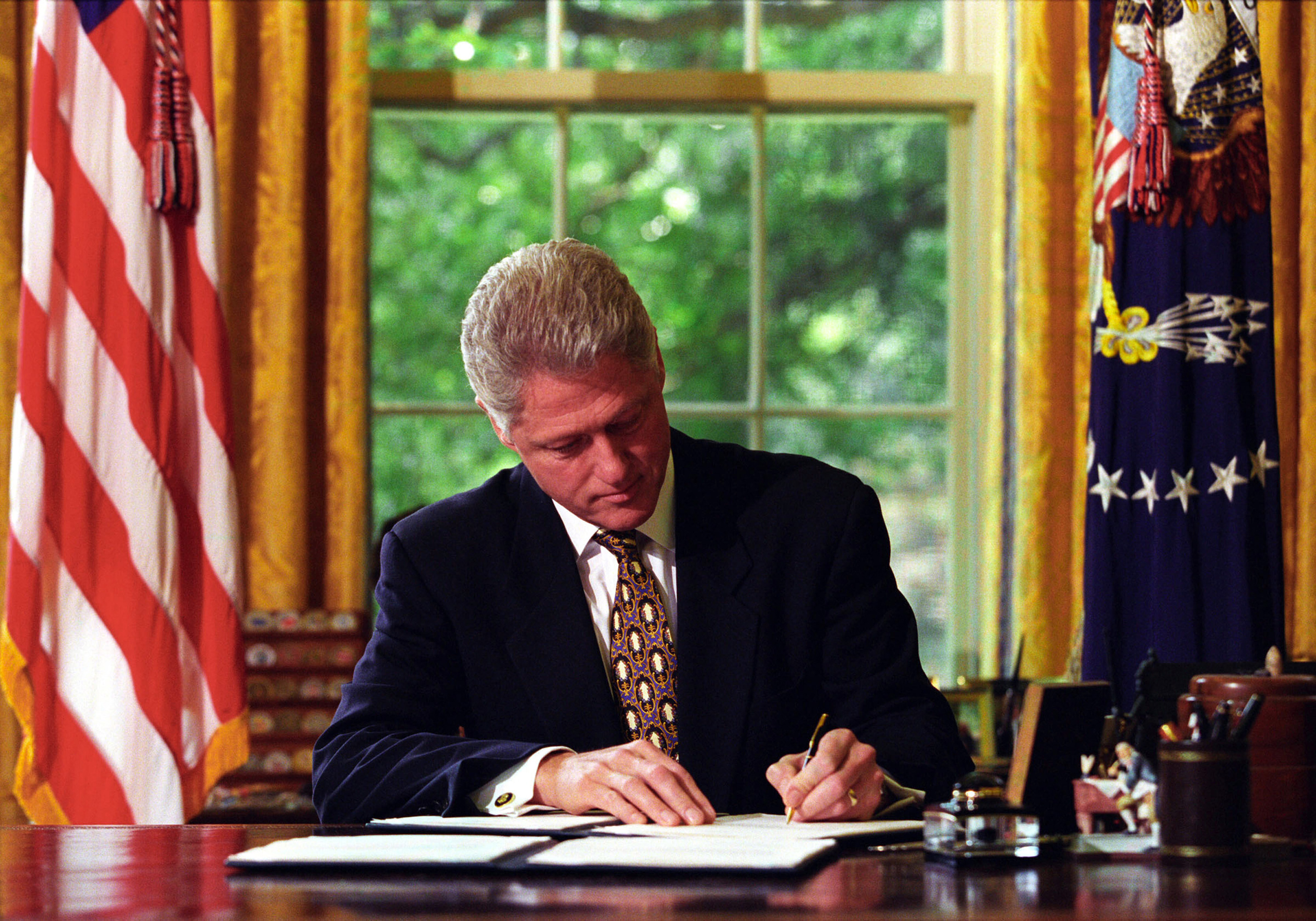
Clinton signing cancellation letters related to his Line-Item Vetoes for the Balanced Budget Act of 1997, August 11, 1997

Presidents of the United States have repeatedly asked Congress to give them line-item veto power. According to Louis Fisher in The Politics of Shared Power, Ronald Reagan said to Congress in his 1984 State of the Union address, "Tonight I ask you to give me what forty-three governors have: Give me a line-item veto this year. Give me the authority to veto waste, and I'll take the responsibility, I'll make the cut, I'll take the heat." Bill Clinton echoed the request in his State of the Union address in 1995. Congress granted this power to the president by the Line Item Veto Act of 1996 to control "pork barrel spending", but in 1998 the U.S. Supreme Court ruled the act to be unconstitutional in a 6–3 decision in Clinton v. City of New York. The court found that exercise of the line-item veto is tantamount to a unilateral amendment or repeal by the executive of only parts of statutes authorizing federal spending, and therefore violated the Presentment Clause of the United States Constitution. Thus a federal line-item veto, at least in this particular formulation, would only be possible through a constitutional amendment. Prior to that ruling, President Clinton applied the line-item veto to the federal budget 82 times.

== Subsequent developments ==
Though the Supreme Court struck down the Line-Item Veto Act in 1998, President George W. Bush asked Congress to enact legislation that would return the line-item veto power to the Executive Authority. First announcing his intent to seek such legislation in his January 31, 2006, State of the Union address, President Bush sent a legislative proposal, the Legislative Line-Item Veto Act of 2006, to the Congress on March 6, 2006, urging its prompt passage. Senators Bill Frist and John McCain, and Republican Whip Senator Mitch McConnell jointly introduced this proposal. Representative Paul Ryan introduced his own version, the Legislative Line Item Veto Act of 2006, in March of that year.

On that same day, Joshua Bolten, the Director of the Office of Management and Budget, gave a press conference on the President’s line-item veto proposal. Bolten explained that the proposed Act would give the President the ability to single out "wasteful" spending and to put such spending on hold. While the spending line-item is on hold, the President can send legislation to Congress to withdraw the particular line-item. The proposal would then be considered in both houses within ten days on an up or down basis and could be passed by a simple majority. Additionally, such proposals could not be filibustered.

When asked how this proposed legislation was different from the 1996 Line-Item Veto Act that the United States Supreme Court had declared illegal, Bolten said that whereas the former act granted unilateral authority to the Executive to disallow specific spending line items, the new proposal would seek Congressional approval of such line-item vetoes. Thus, for the President to successfully withdraw previously enacted spending, a simple majority of Congress is required to agree to specific legislation to that effect.

Though the 2006 line-item veto proposal was much weaker than the 1996 version, it nevertheless failed to find strong support in Congress. Senator Robert C. Byrd of West Virginia, called it "an offensive slap at Congress", asserting that the legislation would enable the President to intimidate individual members of any Congress by targeting the projects of his political opponents. He also complained that the line-item veto as proposed would take away Congress’s constitutional "power of the purse" and give it to the executive branch.

On June 8, 2006, Viet D. Dinh, Professor of Law at Georgetown University Law Center, and Nathan Sales, John M. Olin Fellow at Georgetown University Law Center, testified by written statement before the House Committee on the Budget on the constitutional issues in connection with the proposed legislation. Dinh and Sales argued that the Legislative Line Item Veto Act of 2006 satisfies the Constitution's Bicameralism and Presentment Clause, and therefore avoids the constitutional issues raised in the 1996 Act struck down by the Supreme Court. They also stated that the proposed Act is consistent with the basic principle that grants Congress broad discretion to establish procedures to govern its internal operations.

H.R. 4890, the Legislative Line-Item Veto Act, was approved by the House Budget Committee on June 14, 2006, by a vote of 24–9. It was approved in the full House on June 22. A similar version was included in the "Stop Over Spending Act of 2006", authored by Senator Judd Gregg, in the Senate and approved by the Senate Budget Committee, but the full Senate failed to approve it, thereby preventing the Legislative Line-Item Veto Act from becoming law.

=== Line Item Veto Re-Enactment Activity of 2009 ===
In 2009, Senators Russ Feingold and John McCain introduced legislation of a limited version of the line-item veto. This bill would give the president the power to withdraw earmarks in new bills by sending the bill back to Congress minus the line-item vetoed earmark. Congress would then vote on the line-item vetoed bill with a majority vote under fast track rules to make any deadlines the bill had. This bill was not passed.

=== Debate ===
Some scholars, such as Louis Fisher, believe the line-item veto would give presidents too much power over government spending compared with the power of the Congress.

== See also ==
- State by state chart of veto powers
- Veto power in Illinois
- Clinton v. City of New York, 524 U.S. 417 (1998)
- Raines v. Byrd, 521 U.S. 811 (1997)
- Frankenstein veto
