= Concurrent resolution =

Resolution adopted by both houses of a bicameral leglislature

A concurrent resolution is a resolution (a legislative measure) adopted by both houses of a bicameral legislature that lacks the force of law (is non-binding) and does not require the approval (signature) of the head of state/monarch/chief executive/president. Concurrent resolutions are typically adopted to regulate the internal affairs of the legislature that adopted them, or for other purposes, if authority of law is not necessary (such as in the cases of awards or recognitions).

== United States Congress ==
In the United States Congress, a concurrent resolution is a resolution passed by both the House of Representatives and the Senate but is not presented to the President for signature and does not have the force of law. In contrast, joint resolutions and bills are presented to the President and, once signed or approved over a veto, are enacted and have the force of law.

Concurrent resolutions originating in the Senate are abbreviated S.Con.Res. and those originating in the House are abbreviated H.Con.Res.

Concurrent resolutions are generally used to express the sentiments or opinions or 'sense' of a body or a chamber of legislators acting together; by vote, individual members can authorise the house as a whole to issue the terms of the resolution -- proclaiming or sending it out to the world at large, or to a particular person, state, nation, or institution. They are also used to deal with issues or matters affecting both houses. Examples of concurrent resolutions include:

- providing for a recess or adjournment of more than three days during the session of Congress. (This is required by Article I, Section 5 of the United States Constitution, "Neither House, during the session of Congress, shall, without the consent of the other, adjourn for more than three days, nor to any other place than that in which the two Houses shall be sitting.")
- permitting the use of the Capitol rotunda, which is under the control of both houses.
- providing for a joint session of Congress, normally to hear a message from the President, such as the State of the Union address.
- correcting the enrollment of a bill that has already passed both houses.
- asking the President to return a bill that has been presented to him, before he has signed or vetoed the bill.
- launching the budget process.
- creating a temporary joint committee.

Before the Supreme Court of the United States ended the practice in its decision in Immigration and Naturalization Service v. Chadha 462 U.S. 919 (1983), concurrent resolutions were sometimes used to override executive actions via a mechanism known as the legislative veto.

If both houses of Congress were to censure a President (which has never happened, though both the House and Senate have done so individually) the action would likely, according to parliamentary procedure, be in the form of a concurrent resolution, as a joint resolution would require the President's signature or veto before becoming effective (having the power of law). A concurrent resolution does not have the power of law, nor does it require an approval action by the executive to become effective.

== State legislatures ==
In some U.S. states, a state of emergency can be ended by a concurrent resolution from the state legislature.

== Examples of concurrent resolutions ==
- 113th S.Con.Res. 8 - The Fiscal Year 2014 Senate budget, passed on March 23, 2013.
- 113th H.Con.Res. 25 - The Fiscal Year 2014 House budget, passed on March 21, 2013.
- Senate Concurrent Resolution 10 of the 113th Congress - A bill to use the United States Capitol Visitor Center to celebrate the birthday of King Kamehameha.
- 115 S.Con.Res.3 - Senator Michael B. Enzi (R-WY) introduced the S. Con. Res. 3 and S.84 on January 3, 2017, a "concurrent resolution setting forth the congressional budget for the United States Government for fiscal year 2017 and setting forth the appropriate budgetary levels for fiscal years 2018 through 2026." On January 12, 2017, a resolution provided for "two hours of general debate on S. Con. Res. 3 under a structured rule, and ninety minutes of debate on S.84."
- HJ119 in Florida
- H.Con.Res 83 - Sponsored by Representative Elissa Slotkin and passed by the House of Representatives on January 10, 2020, following the U.S. drone strike against the IRGC's commander Major General Qasem Soleimani and the subsequent escalation of the 2019-20 Persian Gulf crisis, mandates that President Donald Trump cease military activity against Iran without congressional approval. The constitutionality of the resolution is uncertain due to the 1983 Immigration and Naturalization Service v. Chadha decision by the Burger Court limiting legislative veto.

== See also ==
- Bill (law)
- Conditional adjournment
- Joint resolution
- Procedures of the United States Congress
- Simple resolution
