= Louis Fisher =

Louis Fisher may refer to:

- Louis Fisher (politician) (1913–2001), Socialist Labor Party of America candidate for United States President in the 1972 election
- Louis Fisher (legal scholar) (born 1934), American constitutional law scholar
- Louis Matshwenyego Fisher, commander of the Botswana Defence Force

== See also ==
- Louis Fischer (1896–1970), American journalist
