= Chester Sipkin =

American judge

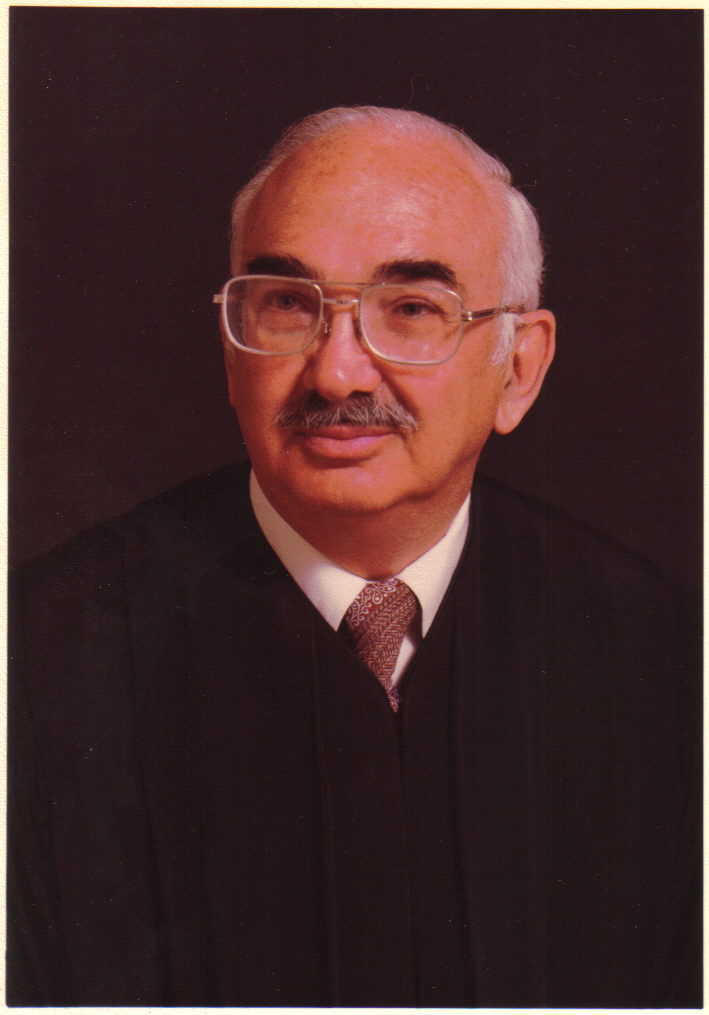
Judge Chester Sipkin

Chester Sipkin (December 2, 1911, in Brooklyn, New York – April 16, 2009, in Greenbrae, California) served as an administrative law judge for the United States Department of Justice Immigration and Naturalization Service (INS) from 1956 to 1979.

== Career ==
Sipkin began his career in the Federal Government when he was hired as a messenger for the U.S. Department of Agriculture in 1932. He completed his law degree at George Washington University in 1942 and then served in the U.S. Navy during World War II. Upon his return from the armed service, he first worked for the Department of Labor in Philadelphia. Then, returning to Washington, D.C., he was employed as a lawyer in the Justice Department. Soon thereafter, he was appointed an administrative judge for the INS and accepted a transfer to California.

Judge Sipkin spent most of his long career as an immigration judge in the San Francisco, California office of the Immigration and Naturalization Service, now a bureau of the Department of Homeland Security known as the U.S. Citizenship and Immigration Services (USCIS). He presided over cases that were worthy of both headlines (the 1967 deportation hearing of infamous San Francisco topless dancer and actress, Persian-born Yvonne D’Angiers) and precedent-setting Immigration and Naturalization Service v. Chadha. His suspension of the deportation of Jagdish Chadha in 1974 set the stage for the pivotal Supreme Court decision that legislative veto violated the constitutional separation of powers. He persuaded members of the American Immigration Lawyers Association to volunteer their services in deportation proceedings, a tradition that continues to this day.

Judge Sipkin retired after more than 48 years of government service. He married water colorist Ruth (Segal) Sipkin in 1947 and together they raised three children.
