= Slaughter rule =

Slaughter Rule may refer to:

- Mercy rule, in sports to allow a lopsided game to come to an early end
- The Slaughter Rule, a 2002 film
- Self-executing rule, a rule used by the United States House of Representatives, which is sometimes called the Slaughter Rule in reference to Representative Louise Slaughter
