= Legislative veto in the United States =

Defunct feature of some U.S. laws which allowed Congress to override presidential actions

The legislative veto was a feature of dozens of statutes enacted by the United States federal government between approximately 1930 and 1980, until held unconstitutional by the U.S. Supreme Court in INS v. Chadha (1983). It is a provision whereby Congress passes a statute granting authority to the president and reserving for itself the ability to override, through simple majority vote, individual actions taken by the president pursuant to that authority.

It has also been widely used by state governments.

== Federal government ==
The legislative veto was first developed in context of the delegation to the president to reorganize governmental agencies and was first authorized by the Legislative Appropriations Act in 1932. It was furthered by the necessities of providing for national security and foreign affairs immediately prior to and during World War II. While the scope of the nondelegation doctrine was greatly limited, Congress wished to provide a method of retaining power over delegated authority, and used the legislative veto as a method of allowing the Executive Branch to respond flexibly to events under "intelligible principles" while allowing Congress to overturn presidential actions that would have lacked sufficient support for legislation explicitly authorizing them.

The legislative veto provision found in federal legislation took several forms. Some laws established a veto procedure that required a simple resolution passed by a majority vote of one chamber of Congress. Other laws required a concurrent resolution passed by both the House and the Senate. Some statutes made the veto process more difficult by requiring not just a majority vote of one or both houses, but a majority of the membership of the legislative body, present or not. Some designated neither the House nor the Senate, but authorized one or more Congressional committees to exercise the veto on behalf of Congress.

The proliferation of legislative veto provisions in legislation raised a series of constitutional questions. Congress until relatively recently had applied the veto provisions to some action taken by the president or another executive officer—such as a reorganization of an agency, the lowering or raising of tariff rates, the disposal of federal property—then began expanding the device to give itself a veto over regulations issued by executive branch agencies, and proposals were made to give Congress a veto over all regulations issued by executive branch independent agencies.

=== INS v. Chadha ===
Under the Immigration and Nationality Act of 1965, the attorney general could suspend a deportation proceeding if the deportation would result in "extreme hardship". After making such a finding, the attorney general would send a report to Congress, and either the House or Senate could veto the attorney general's decision by majority vote. In Immigration and Naturalization Service v. Chadha, 462 U.S. 919 (1983), the Supreme Court considered such a case, in which the attorney general had found that deporting an essentially stateless person would result in extreme hardship, and the House had vetoed the attorney general's decision.

The Court held that a legislative veto on the part of one chamber of the legislature was unconstitutional as violating both the principle of bicameralism embodied in Article I, Section 1 and Section 7, and the presentment provisions of Clauses 2 and 3 of Section 7. The Court's analysis of the presentment issue stated that a provision for a two-chamber veto, though complying with bicameralism, and a provision for veto by a Congressional committee suffer the same constitutional infirmity. In the words of dissenting Justice White, the Court in Chadha "sound[ed] the death knell for nearly 200 other statutory provisions in which Congress has reserved a 'legislative veto.'"

=== Post-Chadha ===
Since Chadha, several mechanisms such as fast-track legislation or sunset clauses, have taken the place of the legislative veto in other laws with greater success in obtaining similar results to the original legislative vetoes.

The Contract with America Advancement Act of 1996, 5 U.S.C. Sections 801-808, allowed Congress to disapprove federal agency regulations; the effect of Chadha is that any such legislative disapproval can be vetoed by the sitting President, and is not a true legislative veto. Instead, its practical use is limited to the initial days of a new President's term following a change in Administration. Such a veto had been exercised only once, in March 2001, until 2017, when the 115th Congress under President Donald Trump passed fifteen such vetoes, overturning various rules issued under the Obama administration.

The proposed REINS Act would expand the CRA's power of legislative ratification over economically-impactful regulatory rules.

== Constitutional Convention ==
Delegates to the Constitutional Convention of 1787 that drafted the U.S. Constitution considered and rejected proposals for a legislative veto designed to reconcile the states to the federal union. Edmund Randolph proposed that: "The National Legislature ought to be impowered [sic] . . . to negative all laws passed by the several States contravening in the opinion of the National Legislature the articles of Union." The provision became part of Alexander Hamilton's proposal for a new government based on national consolidation, all but eliminating state sovereignty.

== States ==
As of 1975, 10 states' constitutions allowed the governor to reorganize state government departments subject to a legislative veto: Alaska, California, Illinois, Kansas, Maryland, Massachusetts, Michigan, Missouri, New Jersey, and Vermont. Three states had statutes authorizing this procedure: Kentucky, Pennsylvania, and South Carolina. In the case of Pennsylvania, however, that state's Supreme Court has invalidated the legislative veto.

=== Legislative ratification of proposed rules ===
Due to the unfavorable view of many state courts against legislative veto powers on similar grounds as Chadha, some state legislatures have instead mandated legislative rules ratification of all executive and regulatory actions, in which certain rules do not take effect without the affirmative approval (with possible legislative amendment) of both houses and the governor.

- The legislatures of Colorado, Tennessee and Utah use sunset approaches in which rules expire after a set time period unless extended by legislation;
- Florida and Wisconsin require legislative ratification for rules deemed to have a significant economic impact, similar to the REINS Act;
- West Virginia prohibits rules from going into effect without approval by both houses and the governor, with a 12-member joint legislative committee called the Legislative Rule-Making Review Committee (LRMRC) exercising review and possible amendment of proposed rules prior to any floor vote.

== See also ==
- Veto
- United States Constitution
- REINS Act, proposed legislation
