= Senate Concurrent Resolution 10 of the 113th Congress =

- Long title: Authorizing the use of Emancipation Hall in the Capitol Visitor Center for an event to celebrate the birthday of King Kamehameha.
- Announced in: the 113th United States Congress
- Sponsored by: Senator Mazie Hirono (D-HI)
- Number of co-sponsors: 1

Codification
- Agencies affected: Architect of the Capitol

Legislative history
- Introduced in the Senate as S.Con.Res 10 by Senator Mazie Hirono (D-HI) on March 22, 2013; Committee consideration by United States Senate Committee on Rules and Administration, United States House Committee on House Administration; Passed the Senate on April 8, 2013 (Unanimous Consent); Passed the House on May 14, 2013 (411-0)

The bill Senate Concurrent Resolution 10, "A concurrent resolution authorizing the use of Emancipation Hall in the Capitol Visitor Center for an event to celebrate the birthday of King Kamehameha", was introduced into the United States Senate in the 113th United States Congress on March 22, 2013. It was sponsored by Senator Mazie Hirono (D-HI). It was passed by the Senate on April 8, 2013 and referred to the United States House of Representatives.

== Provisions/Elements of the bill ==
This summary is based largely on the exact test of the bill, a public domain source.

SECTION 1. USE OF EMANCIPATION HALL FOR EVENT TO CELEBRATE BIRTHDAY OF KING KAMEHAMEHA.

(a) Authorization.--Emancipation Hall in the Capitol Visitor Center is authorized to be used for an event on June 9, 2013, to celebrate the birthday of King Kamehameha.

(b) Preparations.--Physical preparations for the conduct of the ceremony described in subsection (a) shall be carried out in accordance with such conditions as may be prescribed by the Architect of the Capitol.

End of legislation text.

== Procedural history ==
=== Senate ===
S.Con.Res 10 was introduced into the Senate on March 22, 2013 by Senator Mazie Hirono (D-HI). It was co-sponsored by Senator Brian Schatz (D-HI). The bill was referred to the United States Senate Committee on Rules and Administration. It was passed by the Senate on April 8, 2013 and referred to the United States House of Representatives.

=== House ===
S.Con.Res 10 was received by the House on April 9, 2013. It was referred to the United States House Committee on House Administration. The House Majority Leader Eric Cantor announced on Friday May 10, 2013 that H.R. 1580 would be considered the following week. It passed the house unanimously on May 14, 2013.

== See also ==
- List of bills in the 113th United States Congress
