= Conditional adjournment =

In the United States, conditional adjournment refers to the authority given to the Speaker of the House of Representatives and the president pro tempore or the Majority Leader of the Senate, when Congress is in recess for more than three days, to reconvene Congress at a date earlier than scheduled to address a time-critical issue or emergency. This authority is defined in the concurrent resolution authorizing the conditional adjournment.

== See also ==
- Recess (motion)
