= Suspension of the rules in the United States Congress =

Set of procedures within the United States Congress

Suspension of the rules in the United States Congress is the specific set of procedures within the United States Congress that allows for the general parliamentary procedure of how and when to suspend the rules.

== U.S. House of Representatives ==
=== Overview ===
In the United States House of Representatives, suspension of the rules is a procedure generally used to quickly pass bills which enjoy broad, bipartisan support.

A member can make a motion to suspend the rules only if the Speaker of the House allows them to. Once a member moves to "suspend the rules" and take some action, debate is limited to 40 minutes, no amendments can be offered to the motion or the underlying matter, and a 2/3 majority of Members present and voting is required to agree to the motion.

Under the rules of the 119th Congress, motions for suspension of the rules are allowed only on Mondays, Tuesdays and Wednesdays, as they were prior to the 116th Congress. During the 117th and 118th Congress, a motion to suspend the rules could be made on any day.

A suspension motion sets aside all procedural and other rules that otherwise prohibit the House from considering the measure—but the motion never mentions the specific rules that are suspended. Typically, a suspension motion is phrased as a motion to "...suspend the rules and pass the bill" and, if the motion is agreed to, the bill is considered passed by the House. This means that, most of the time, a suspension motion is effectively a motion to pass a bill immediately notwithstanding any rule preventing such immediate passage. A member can also move to suspend the rules and take another action, such as to "suspend the rules and consider the bill," and the House shall take the proposed action if two-thirds of those voting are in favor of the motion.

Most often, bills "on suspension" are non-controversial legislation—such as naming Post Offices of the United States Postal Service or federal buildings. However, in the 118th Congress, suspension of the rules was often used in order to pass spending bills and continuing resolutions. Since those bills were negotiated between the Republican-controlled House and the Democratic-controlled Senate, they were generally supported by many members from both parties (allowing them to clear the two-thirds threshold required for suspension of the rules), although they were repeatedly opposed by dozens of fiscally conservative Republicans.

=== Suspension calendar ===
These votes, under the rules, may only take place on Mondays, Tuesdays, and Wednesdays. Under special circumstances, suspension votes may take place on Thursdays or Fridays, or other days, but that happens rarely and requires a separate vote of the House as to whether that should occur.

The 2007 U.S. Farm Bill was considered using such a procedure. Due to a procedural glitch, the bill was improperly sent to the President and in an unusual attempt to solve the problem, the House passed it again as H.R. 6124. Hence the House Leadership used the suspension calendar to do so.

Other examples of suspension bills in the 110th United States Congress:

- H.Con.Res. 300 – Recognizing the necessity for the United States to maintain its significant leadership role in improving the health and promoting the resiliency of coral reef ecosystems, and for other purposes (Rep. Bordallo – Natural Resources)
- S.J.Res. 17 – A joint resolution directing the United States to initiate international discussions and take necessary steps with other Nations to negotiate an agreement for managing migratory and transboundary fish stocks in the Arctic Ocean (Sen. Stevens (AK) – Natural Resources)
- H.Con.Res. 325 – Celebrating the 50th Anniversary of the Mackinac Island State Park Commission's Historical Preservation and Museum Program, which began on June 15, 1958 (Rep. Stupak – Natural Resources)
- H.Res. 1074 – Honoring the 60th anniversary of the commencement of the carving of the Crazy Horse Memorial (Rep. Herseth Sandlin – Natural Resources)
- H.R. 1464 – To assist in the conservation of rare felids and rare canids by supporting and providing financial resources for the conservation programs of nations within the range of rare felid and rare canid populations and projects of persons with demonstrated expertise in the conservation of rare felid and rare canid populations (Rep. Udall (NM) – Natural Resources)

== U.S. Senate ==
In the United States Senate, Rule XVI prohibits amendments that propose general legislation to appropriations legislations. To prevent a point of order from killing the amendment, a Senator may offer a motion to suspend rule XVI, paragraph 4, essentially making the order germane. This motion requires a 2/3 majority to approve, meaning that it rarely passes. It should not be confused with a motion to waive the Budget Act, which requires a 3/5 vote to pass and applies to amendments that spend in amounts that exceed the levels set out in the annual budget resolution, as well as many other financial issues.

== See also ==
- United States House Committee on Rules
- Self-executing rule
