= Commutation (law) =

Substitution of a lesser penalty after the conviction for a crime

In law, a commutation is the substitution of a lesser penalty for that given after a conviction for a crime. The penalty can be lessened in severity, in duration, or both. Unlike most pardons by government and overturning by the court (a full overturning is equal to an acquittal), a commutation does not affect the status of a defendant's underlying criminal conviction.

Although the concept of commutation may be used to broadly describe the substitution of a lesser criminal penalty for the original sentence, some jurisdictions have historically used the term only for the substitution of a sentence of a different character from what was originally imposed by the court; for example, the substitution of a sentence of parole for the original sentence of incarceration. A jurisdiction that uses that definition of commutation would use another term, such as a remission, to describe a reduction of a penalty that does not change its character.

A commutation does not reverse a conviction and the recipient of a commutation remains guilty in accordance with the original conviction. For example, someone convicted of capital murder may have their sentence of death commuted to life imprisonment, a lessening of the punishment that does not affect the underlying criminal conviction, as may occur on a discretionary basis or following upon a change in the law or judicial ruling that limits or eliminates the death penalty.

In some jurisdictions, a commutation of sentence may be conditional, meaning that the convicted person may be required to abide by specified conditions or the beneficiary may lose the benefit of the commutation. The conditions must be lawful and reasonable, and will typically expire when the convicted completes any remaining portion of their sentence. For example, the commutation may be conditioned upon the person's being a law-abiding citizen, such that if the beneficiary of the commutation commits a new crime before the condition expires the original sentence may be restored.

== By country ==
=== Guatemala ===
In 1983, Guatemala's president, Efraín Ríos Montt refused a request from Pope John Paul II, while he was visiting the country, to commute the sentences of six left-wing guerrillas who had been sentenced to death.

=== United States ===
==== U.S. Constitution ====
Article II, Section 2 of the United States Constitution states that the President "shall have power to grant reprieves and pardons for offenses against the United States, except in cases of impeachment".

== See also ==
- Pardon § Related concepts
