= Signing ceremony =

Ceremony in which a document of importance is signed

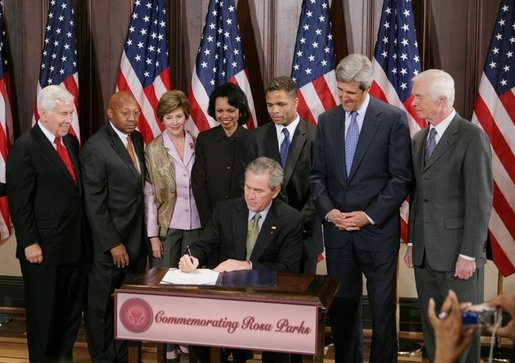
U.S. President George W. Bush signs a law in 2005 to place a statue of Rosa Parks at the U.S. Capitol.

A signing ceremony is a ceremony in which a document of importance is signed (approved). Typically the document is a bill passed by a legislature, thus becoming a law by an executive's signature. However, the document may also be, for example, an executive order, international agreement, or a veto statement that invalidates a legislative measure.

The act of electronically signing a document may be referred to as a signing ceremony. The act of physically signing a signature is seen as adding gravitas to the moment.

== History ==
Signing ceremonies are derived from ceremonies that occurred when the British monarch gave Royal Assent to acts of Parliament. Signing ceremonies became an aspect of American politics.

Signing ceremonies may be performed by U.S. state governors upon signing a state document (generally an act of the state legislature, making it into state law) or by the President of the United States (generally making an act of Congress into federal law). The President typically invites Congressional leaders who were instrumental in the bill's passage as well as interested community members.

One practice is to use multiple pens and honor individuals by giving them the pens used to form the signature; typically, one pen would be used for each stroke of the president's signature. For example, the signing of the 1964 Civil Rights Act, President Lyndon B. Johnson used more than 75 pens. The pens were then given to attending dignitaries and supporters of the bill, including Rosa Parks, Attorney General Robert F. Kennedy, Hubert Humphrey, Everett McKinley Dirksen and Martin Luther King Jr.

The practice of using multiple pens was briefly stopped during the presidency of Donald Trump, who preferred to sign the bills with one Sharpie-like pen and then hold up the signed document for a photo op. Joe Biden intermittently continued the practice of using multiple pens before reverting to using one pen in late 2021.

Signing ceremonies are associated with acts that are viewed as legislative triumphs for the executive. Conversely, laws that are passed reluctantly or are controversial are often signed into law quietly and privately without ceremony.

== Non-government usage ==
Signing ceremonies may be performed by non-government signatories for purposes including the signing of a contract or will. Signing ceremonies can attest to significant events, such as a beam-signing ceremony to mark a construction milestone.

== See also ==
- Article One of the United States Constitution
- Line-item veto
- List of United States presidential vetoes
- Political culture
- Signing statement
- Veto override
