= Presentment Clause =

United States Constitutional clause governing how bills are passed into laws by Congress

The Presentment Clause (Article I, Section 7, Clauses 2 and 3) of the United States Constitution outlines federal legislative procedure by which bills originating in Congress become federal law in the United States.

== Text ==
The Presentment Clause, which is contained in Article I, Section 7, Clauses 2 and 3, provides:

Every Bill which shall have passed the House of Representatives and the Senate, shall, before it become a Law, be presented to the President of the United States: If he approve he shall sign it, but if not he shall return it, with his Objections to that House in which it shall have originated, who shall enter the Objections at large on their Journal, and proceed to reconsider it. If after such Reconsideration two thirds of that House shall agree to pass the Bill, it shall be sent, together with the Objections, to the other House, by which it shall likewise be reconsidered, and if approved by two thirds of that House, it shall become a Law. But in all such Cases the Votes of both Houses shall be determined by Yeas and Nays, and the Names of the Persons voting for and against the Bill shall be entered on the Journal of each House respectively. If any Bill shall not be returned by the President within ten Days (Sundays excepted) after it shall have been presented to him, the Same shall be a Law, in like Manner as if he had signed it, unless the Congress by their Adjournment prevent its Return, in which Case it shall not be a Law. Every Order, Resolution, or Vote to which the Concurrence of the Senate and House of Representatives may be necessary (except on a question of Adjournment) shall be presented to the President of the United States; and before the Same shall take Effect, shall be approved by him, or being disapproved by him, shall be repassed by two thirds of the Senate and House of Representatives, according to the Rules and Limitations prescribed in the Case of a Bill.

== Summary ==
- A bill must be passed in identical form by both the House of Representatives and the Senate. It is common practice for each House to pass its own version of a bill, and then to refer the two versions to a conference committee, which resolves disagreements between the two versions, and drafts a compromise bill; the compromise bill can then be voted upon and passed by both chambers in identical form.
- After a bill passes both chambers, it must be presented to the President for his approval.
  - If the President approves the bill and signs it, then the bill becomes law.
  - If the President disapproves the bill and vetoes it, then he must return the bill, along with a veto message (his objections), back to the House in which the bill was created.
    - A two-thirds majority of both chambers may override the veto, and the bill will become law without the President's signature. In overriding a veto, the votes of both chambers must be done by "yeas and nays" (also known as a "roll-call" vote), and the names of the persons voting for and against the bill must be recorded.
  - If, while the Congress is in session, the President does not sign a bill or veto it within 10 days (not counting Sundays) after its presentment, then it automatically becomes law. If a bill is presented on a Monday or Tuesday, the President has 11 calendar days; otherwise he has 12.
  - If Congress prevents the return of the bill, by not being in session (adjourned), and the President does not sign a bill or veto it within 10 days (not counting Sundays) after its presentment, then it fails to become law. This "pocket veto"—so called because the President is then said to have put the bill in his pocket and forgotten about it—cannot be overridden by Congress, but once Congress reconvenes it can pass the same bill again. In addition, Congressional pro forma sessions may be used to prevent pocket vetoes.

== Veto issues ==
=== Line-item veto ===
The Supreme Court decision in Clinton v. City of New York, 524 U.S. 417 (1998), struck down as unconstitutional the Line Item Veto Act of 1996, holding that the line-item veto violated the Presentment Clause.

=== Legislative veto ===
The Supreme Court also found the legislative veto unconstitutional in Immigration and Naturalization Service v. Chadha, 462 U.S. 919 (1983), as violating the Presentment Clause and bicameralism.

== Exclusion of Sundays ==
The ten-day period for the presidential review of legislation excludes Sundays. Some scholars believe this exclusion was not for religious reasons, but intended to support a deliberative process in which the President would consult and seek advice regarding the merits of the proposed law. For instance, legal author Jaynie Randall has stated that because the blue laws of various states restricted travel on Sundays, to allow a full ten days of consideration between the President and his advisors, the drafters of the Constitution excluded Sundays from the review period. However, Justice Brewer, speaking for a unanimous Supreme Court in Church of the Holy Trinity v. United States, 143 U.S. 457 (1892), cited the Presentment Clause as a clear example of why "no purpose of action against religion can be imputed to any legislation, state or national, because this is a religious people." Specifically, the Court stated:

Even the Constitution of the United States, which is supposed to have little touch upon the private life of the individual ... provides in Article I, Section 7, a provision common to many constitutions, that the executive shall have ten days (Sundays excepted) within which to determine whether he will approve or veto a bill. There is no dissonance in these declarations. There is a universal language pervading them all, having one meaning. They affirm and reaffirm that this is a religious nation.

== Constitutional amendments ==
Article Five of the Constitution, which prescribes the process whereby the Constitution may be altered, contains no requirement that a joint resolution proposing a constitutional amendment be presented to the president for approval or veto before it goes out to the states. In Hollingsworth v. Virginia, 3 U.S. (3 Dall.) 378 (1798), the Supreme Court affirmed that doing so is not necessary. Consequently, the president has no official function in the process.

== National Archives ==
1 U.S.C. § 106a provides that whenever a bill becomes law or takes effect, it will be received by the Archivist of the United States from the President. This allows the National Archives and Records Administration to maintain records of and publish the enacted laws.

== See also ==
- Signing statement
