= Line Item Veto Act of 1996 =

United States law ruled unconstitutional

Line Item Veto Act
- Long title: An Act To give the President line item veto authority with respect to appropriations, new direct spending, and limited tax benefits.
- Enacted by: the 104th United States Congress

Citations
- Public law: Pub. L. 104–130 (text) (PDF)
- Statutes at Large: 110 Stat. 1200

Legislative history
- Introduced in the Senate as "Legislative Line Item Veto Act of 1995" (S. 4) by Bob Dole (R-KS) on January 4, 1995; Committee consideration by Senate Governmental Affairs, Senate Budget; Passed the Senate on March 23, 1995 (69–29); Passed the House on May 17, 1995 (Unanimous Consent); Reported by the joint conference committee on March 21, 1996; agreed to by the Senate on March 27, 1996 (69–31) and by the House on March 28, 1996 (by H. Res. 391 232–177); Signed into law by President Bill Clinton on April 9, 1996

United States Supreme Court cases
- Clinton v. City of New York

The Line Item Veto Act (Pub. L. 104–130 (text) (PDF)) was a federal law of the United States that granted the president the power to line-item veto budget bills passed by Congress. It was signed into law on April 9, 1996, but its effect was brief since it was ruled unconstitutional by the Supreme Court just over two years later, in Clinton v. City of New York.

== Legislative history ==
The bill was introduced by Senator Bob Dole on January 4, 1995, cosponsored by Senator John McCain and 29 other senators. Related House Bills included H.R. 147, H.R. 391, H.R. 2,H.R. 27 and H.R. 3136. The bill was signed into law by President Bill Clinton on April 9, 1996.

== Judicial review ==
=== Raines v. Byrd ===
It was immediately challenged in the United States District Court for the District of Columbia by a group of six senators, first among whom was Senator Robert Byrd (D-WV), where it was declared unconstitutional by District Judge Harry Jackson, a Reagan appointee, on April 10, 1997. The case was subsequently remanded by the Supreme Court of the United States with instructions to dismiss on the grounds that the senators had not suffered sufficient, particularized injury to maintain suit under Article III of the United States Constitution (i.e., the senators lacked standing). The case, Raines v. Byrd, 521 U.S. 811 (1997), was handed down on June 26, 1997, and did not include a judgment on the constitutional grounds of the law.

=== Clinton v. City of New York ===
Clinton subsequently used the veto on a provision of the Balanced Budget Act of 1997 and two provisions of the Taxpayer Relief Act of 1997, each of which was challenged in a separate case: one by the City of New York, two hospital associations, one hospital, and two health care unions; the other by a farmers' cooperative from Idaho and an individual member of the cooperative. Senators Byrd, Moynihan, Levin, and Hatfield again opposed the law, this time through Amicus curiae briefs.

Judge Thomas Hogan of the United States District Court for the District of Columbia combined the cases and declared the law unconstitutional on February 12, 1998. This ruling was subsequently affirmed on June 25, 1998, by a 6–3 decision of the Supreme Court of the United States in the case Clinton v. City of New York. Justices Breyer, Scalia, and O'Connor dissented. The ruling has been criticized by some legal scholars.

== See also ==
- Line-item veto
- Line-item veto in the United States
