= Raines v. Byrd =

- Supreme Court of the United States

Argued May 27, 1997 Decided June 26, 1997
- Full case name: Raines v. Byrd
- Citations: 521 U.S. 811 (more) 117 S. Ct. 2312; 138 L. Ed. 2d 849

Case history
- Prior: Byrd v. Raines, 956 F. Supp. 25 (D.D.C. 1997)
- Subsequent: Clinton v. City of New York

Court membership
- Chief Justice William Rehnquist Associate Justices John P. Stevens · Sandra Day O'Connor; Antonin Scalia · Anthony Kennedy; David Souter · Clarence Thomas; Ruth Bader Ginsburg · Stephen Breyer

Case opinions
- Majority: Rehnquist, joined by O'Connor, Scalia, Kennedy, Thomas, Ginsburg
- Concurrence: Souter, joined by Ginsburg
- Dissent: Stevens
- Dissent: Breyer

Raines v. Byrd, 521 U.S. 811 (1997), was a United States Supreme Court case in which the Court held individual members of Congress do not automatically have standing to litigate the constitutionality of laws affecting Congress as a whole.

== Background of the case ==
The Line Item Veto Act of 1996 allowed the president to nullify certain provisions of appropriations bills, and disallowed the use of funds from canceled provisions for offsetting deficit spending in other areas.

At its passage, the Act was politically controversial, with many Democrats breaking with Clinton to oppose it. Of the opposition, six members of Congress, including Republican Mark Hatfield, sued to prevent use of the line-item veto. U.S. District Court Judge Thomas Penfield Jackson found the Act unconstitutional.

== Opinion of the Court ==
The Supreme Court held that the plaintiffs lacked standing to sue, as they had not suffered any particularized injury. The court held that individual members of Congress were subject to strict limits on their ability to sue, particularly in a dispute between different branches of government.

== Subsequent events ==
After taking effect, the Line Item Veto Act of 1996 was found unconstitutional in Clinton v. City of New York by the Supreme Court of the United States in 1998.
