= Frankenstein veto =

American selective veto at the state level

A Frankenstein veto occurs when an American state governor selectively deletes words from a bill, stitching together the remainder (à la Victor Frankenstein) to form a new bill different from that passed by the legislature.

The practice arises from the power to veto individual words in a bill passed by the legislature rather than the bill in toto. It became particularly prominent in Wisconsin, where a 1930 amendment to the state constitution gave the governor the power to veto parts of a budget. This power was used by governors of both parties "to create spending or to redirect tax funds in ways never approved by the Legislature" by "string[ing] together pieces of separate sentences to create a single new sentence".

For instance, in 2005 Governor Jim Doyle used selective deletion to transform "a 272-word section of the Legislature's budget into a 20-word sentence that took $427 million from the transportation budget and gave it to public schools". The same technique was used the following year to raise the levy limits on local governments from 2% to 3.86%.

In 2008, the state constitution was amended to place certain restrictions on the Frankenstein veto. Even with those changes, the governor of Wisconsin still has far greater veto powers than any other governor in the United States of America. The Wisconsin State Journal, in response, stated that "no Governor should be allowed to veto all but a couple dozen words and figures across reams of text in state budgets to unilaterally create law from scratch." The New York Times called the practice "a legislative twist on the game of Mad Libs".

== Example ==
Governor Jim Doyle's 2005 veto removed the following struck text from a transportation bill:

~~(4f) Agency request relating to Marquette interchange reconstruction project bonding. Notwithstanding section 16.42 (1) of the statutes, in submitting information under section 16.42 of the statutes for purposes of the 2007-09 biennial budget act,~~ the department of transportation shall ~~include recommended reductions to the appropriation under section 20.395 (3) (cr) of the statutes for each fiscal year of the 2007-09 fiscal biennium reflecting the~~ transfer ~~from this appropriation account~~ to the ~~appropriation account under section 20.395 (6) (au) of the statutes, as created by this act, of amounts for anticipated debt service payments, in each fiscal year of the 2007-09 fiscal biennium, on~~ general ~~obligation bonds issued under section 20.866 (2) (uup) of the statutes, as created by this act.~~

~~[...]~~

~~(d) If, in considering a request made under paragraph (a), the joint committee on finance determines that $572,700 in fiscal year 2005-06 or $629,900 in fiscal year 2006-07 is not sufficient to~~ fund ~~passenger rail service, the committee may supplement the appropriation account under section 20.395 (2) (cr) of the statutes,~~ from ~~the appropriation under section 20.865 (4) (u) of the statutes, by an amount that would not cause~~ the transportation fund ~~to have a negative balance. Notwithstanding section 13.101 (3) of the statutes, the committee is not required to find that an emergency exists prior to making the supplementation.~~

~~(5f) Village of Oregon streetscaping project.~~ In the 2005-07 fiscal biennium, ~~from the appropriation under section 20.395 (2) (nx) of the statutes, the department of transportation shall award a grant under section 85.026 (2) of the statutes of~~ $4 ~~84,000 to the village of Oregon in Dane County for a streetscaping project on Main Street and Janesville Street in the village of Oregon if the village of Oregon contributes funds for the project that at least equal 20 percent of the costs of the project.~~

~~(5g) Chippewa county crossing and ramp. In the~~ 2~~005-0~~7 ~~fiscal biennium, from the appropriation under section 2~~0 ~~.395 (2) (nx) of the statutes, the department of transportation shall award a grant under section 85.~~0~~26 (2) of the statutes of $8~~0,000 ~~to Chippewa County for the construction of a pedestrian-railroad crossing and handicap-accessible ramp related to the Ray's Beach revitalization project on Lake Wissota in Chippewa County if Chippewa County contributes funds for the project that at least equal 20 percent of the costs of the project~~.

These removals reduced the text to read:

the department of transportation shall transfer to the general fund from the transportation fund In the 2005-07 fiscal biennium, $427000000.

== "Vanna White veto" ==
The "Vanna White veto" is a name given to the practice of striking individual letters or numbers from a bill, named for the co-host of the Wheel of Fortune game show. In 1973, Wisconsin Governor Patrick Lucey amended a budget bill using a partial veto, by striking the numeral "2" from a $25 million highway bonding authorization, reducing it to $5 million. In the 1987-89 budget bill, Governor Tommy Thompson was able to alter a deliquency detainment limit from "not more than 48 hours" to "not more than ten days", by striking the "48 hours" and selectively removing parts of later words in that section to assemble the words "ten days".

== Curtailment ==
Wisconsin eliminated the "Vanna White veto" in 1990 by prohibiting state leaders from "deleting individual alphabetic letters and numerical characters in a bill to change the intent of the legislation" in response to its controversial use by Thompson.

An amendment to the Wisconsin Constitution passed in 2008 sought to curb the practice even further, but its prohibition on "crossing out words and numbers to create a new sentence from two or more sentences" left intact the Governor's power to "cross out words within a sentence to change its meaning, remove individual digits to create new numbers or delete entire sentences from paragraphs." This loophole has allowed the practice to continue, albeit less frequently. One prominent example occurred in 2023 when Governor Tony Evers exercised his veto power to extend revenue increases for Wisconsin public schools until 2425; he did this by changing the line "for the 2023–2024 school year and the 2024–2025 school year" into "for 2023–2425" ("for ~~the~~ 2023–~~2024 school year and the 20~~24~~–20~~25 ~~school year~~").

== See also ==
- Governor of Wisconsin
- Line item veto
- Blackout poetry
