= Legislative veto =

Feature present in several forms of government

The legislative veto describes features of at least two different forms of government, monarchies and those based on the separation of powers, applied to the authority of the monarch in the first and to the authority of the legislature in the second.

In the case of monarchy, legislative veto describes the right of the ruler to nullify the actions of a legislative body, for example, the French monarch's claim to the right to veto actions of the National Assembly at the start of the French Revolution.

In a parliamentary system with a bicameral legislature, it refers to the authority of the upper chamber, like Canada's Senate, to reject legislation or certain prescribed categories of legislation.

In the case of representative governments that divide their executive and legislative functions, legislative veto refers to the power of a legislature, or one house of a bicameral legislature, to nullify an action of the executive authority. The practice was common for several decades in the United States at the federal level until the Supreme Court ruled the practice unconstitutional in 1983 in Immigration and Naturalization Service v. Chadha.

In Germany, the term refers to the authority of the Bundesrat, which represents the German states, to nullify certain categories of legislation enacted by the Bundestag, the nation's legislature.

== See also ==
- Legislative veto in the United States
