= Louis Fisher (legal scholar) =

American law scholar

Louis Fisher (born August 17, 1934) is an American constitutional law scholar. He is the Scholar in Residence at the Constitution Project. From 1970 to 2006, he was senior specialist in separation of powers at the Congressional Research Service and from 2006 to 2010, a specialist in constitutional law at the Law Library of Congress. After completing his doctoral work in political science at the New School for Social Research in 1967, he taught full-time at Queens College, City University of New York for three years. Later he taught part-time at other universities and law schools.

== Books ==
- President and Congress: Power and Policy (1972)
- Presidential Spending Power (1975)
- The Constitution Between Friends: Congress, the President, and the Law (1978)
- The Politics of Shared Power (4th ed. 1998)
- Constitutional Conflicts Between Congress and the President (6th ed. 2014)
- Constitutional Dialogues (1988)
- American Constitutional Law (with Katy J. Harriger, 10th ed. 2013)
- Presidential War Power (3rd ed. 2014)
- Political Dynamics of Constitutional Law (with Neal Devins, 5th ed. 2011)
- Congressional Abdication on War and Spending (2000)
- Religious Liberty in America: Political Safeguards (2002)
- Nazi Saboteurs on Trial: A Military Tribunal and American Law (2003; 2d ed. 2005)
- The Politics of Executive Privilege (2004)
- The Democratic Constitution (with Neal Devins, 2004)
- Military Tribunals and Presidential Power: American Revolution to the War on Terrorism (2005)
- In the Name of National Security: Unchecked Presidential Power and the Reynolds Case (2006)
- The Constitution and 9/11: Recurring Threats to America's Freedoms (2008)
- The Supreme Court and Congress: Rival Interpretations (2009)
- On Appreciating Congress: The People's Branch (2010)
- Defending Congress and the Constitution (2011)
- On the Supreme Court: Without Illusion and Idolatry (2014)
- The Law of the Executive Branch: Presidential Power (2014)
- Congress: Protecting Individual Rights (2016)
- Supreme Court Expansion of Presidential Power: Unconstitutional Leanings (2017)
- President Obama: Constitutional Aspirations and Executive Actions (2018)
- Reconsidering Judicial Finality: Why the Supreme Court is Not the Last Word on the Constitution (2019)
