= Clinton v. City of New York =

1998 U.S. Supreme Court case declaring the line-item veto unconstitutional

- Supreme Court of the United States

Argued April 27, 1998 Decided June 25, 1998
- Full case name: William J. Clinton, President of the United States, et al. v. City of New York, et al.
- Citations: 524 U.S. 417 (more) 118 S. Ct. 2091; 141 L. Ed. 2d 393; 1998 U.S. LEXIS 4215; 66 U.S.L.W. 4543; 98-2 U.S. Tax Cas. (CCH) ¶ 50,504; 81 A.F.T.R.2d (RIA) 2416; 98 Cal. Daily Op. Service 4905; 98 Daily Journal DAR 6893; 1998 Colo. J. C.A.R. 3191; 11 Fla. L. Weekly Fed. S 735

Case history
- Prior: Judgment for plaintiffs, 985 F. Supp. 168 (D.D.C. 1998)

Holding
- The Line Item Veto Act is unconstitutional because the Constitution of the United States of America does not authorize the President of the United States of America to amend federal legislation that has passed both the House of Representatives and the Senate in Congress. Line-item vetoes are unlawful.

Court membership
- Chief Justice William Rehnquist Associate Justices John P. Stevens · Sandra Day O'Connor; Antonin Scalia · Anthony Kennedy; David Souter · Clarence Thomas; Ruth Bader Ginsburg · Stephen Breyer

Case opinions
- Majority: Stevens, joined by Rehnquist, Kennedy, Souter, Thomas, Ginsburg
- Concurrence: Kennedy
- Concur/dissent: Scalia, joined by O'Connor; Breyer (Part III)
- Dissent: Breyer, joined by O'Connor, Scalia (Part III)

Laws applied
- U.S. Const. art. I; 2 U.S.C. § 691 et seq. (1994 ed., Supp. II) (Line Item Veto Act of 1996)

Clinton v. City of New York, 524 U.S. 417 (1998), is a landmark decision by the Supreme Court of the United States in which the Court held, 6–3, that the line-item veto, as implemented in the Line Item Veto Act of 1996, violated the Presentment Clause of the United States Constitution because it impermissibly gave the president of the United States the power to unilaterally amend or repeal parts of statutes that had been duly passed by the United States Congress. Justice John Paul Stevens wrote for the six-justice majority that the line-item veto gave the president power over legislation unintended by the Constitution, and was therefore a violation of the separation of powers between the two branches.

== Background of the case ==
The Line Item Veto Act allowed the president to "cancel", that is to void or legally nullify, certain provisions of appropriations bills, and disallowed the use of funds from canceled provisions for offsetting deficit spending in other areas.

=== Political circumstances ===
The 1994 midterm elections signaled an upheaval in American politics known as the Republican Revolution, with the Republican Party taking control of both houses of the U.S. Congress from Democrats. Key to that revolution was the Republicans' Contract with America, which included a list of actions they promised to take if they gained control of Congress. Among this list was the Line Item Veto Act itself, one of two provisions designed to ensure congressional fiscal conservatism. The Act was the only provision of the "Contract with America" that President Clinton supported.

=== Initial litigation ===
At its passage, the Act was politically controversial, with many Democrats breaking with Clinton to oppose it. Of the opposition, six members of Congress, including Republican Mark Hatfield, sued to prevent use of the line-item veto. They were granted summary judgment by the U.S. District Court, but the Supreme Court held that the Congressmen lacked standing because they could not show any particularized harm, and dismissed their suit in Raines v. Byrd, 521 U.S. 811 (1997). Within the next two months, Clinton began using the line-item veto, prompting several entities to file suit in a second attempt to have the Act declared unconstitutional.

In the second case, which was consolidated from two cases by the U.S. District Court for the District of Columbia, the City of New York and several organizations related to health care alleged injury from President Clinton's cancellation of certain provisions of the Balanced Budget Act of 1997 that eliminated certain liabilities, and Snake River Potato Growers, Inc. alleged injury from the President's cancellation of certain provisions of the Taxpayer Relief Act of 1997 that gave tax benefits to aid farmer's cooperatives in purchasing potato processing facilities.

The District Court ruled for the plaintiffs, holding that the Line Item Veto Act was unconstitutional. Because the Act established an expedited appeal process for challenges, the case was directly appealed from the District Court to the Supreme Court.

== Supreme Court's decision ==
In a majority opinion written by Justice John Paul Stevens, the Court ruled that because the Act allowed the president to unilaterally amend or repeal parts of duly enacted statutes by using line-item cancellations, it violated the Presentment Clause of the Constitution, which outlines a specific practice for enacting a statute. The Court construed the silence of the Constitution on the subject of such unilateral presidential action as equivalent to "an express prohibition", agreeing with historical material that supported the conclusion that statutes may only be enacted "in accord with a single, finely wrought and exhaustively considered, procedure", and that a bill must be approved or rejected by the president in its entirety.

=== Kennedy's concurrence ===
Justice Anthony M. Kennedy, in an opinion concurring in the opinion and judgment of the Court, objected to the dissent's argument that the Act did not violate principles of the separation of powers and threaten individual liberty, stating that the "undeniable effects" of the Act were to "enhance the President's power to reward one group and punish another, to help one set of taxpayers and hurt another, to favor one State and ignore another". Kennedy's concurrence implicitly viewed the statute as a violation of the nondelegation doctrine.

=== Breyer's dissent ===
In a dissenting opinion, Justice Stephen Breyer contended that the objective of the Act was constitutionally proper and was consistent with powers that the president has held in the past, stating that the Act "does not violate any specific textual constitutional command, nor does it violate any implicit Separation of Powers principle". He extensively refers to many different cases which support the delegation of power by the Congress, and primarily suggests that the Act is an efficient means by which a constitutionally legitimate end may be achieved.

=== Scalia's partial concurrence and partial dissent ===
In an alternative opinion, Justice Antonin Scalia objected to the Court's consideration of the case with respect to the Taxpayer Relief Act, finding no party in the case with standing to challenge it. However, he did find a party with standing to challenge the president's cancellation in the Balanced Budget Act, and concluded that it did not violate the Constitution, because the Congress has the power to delegate the discretionary authority to decline to spend appropriated sums of money, which he asserted was equivalent to cancellation.

== Critical response ==
Michael B. Rappaport argued that the original meaning of the Constitution does not apply to certain parts of the nondelegation doctrine, relying on his interpretation of the Executive Power Vesting Clause. Under this view, "laws that authorize the withdrawal of money from the treasury and which have traditionally taken the form of authorizing a certain amount to be spent for particular programs ... are not subject to the nondelegation doctrine". He further criticized the majority opinion for failing to satisfactorily justify its application of a stricter standard to the delegation of cancellation authority than it had used in the past for other executive delegations. In Rappaport's opinion, "the Court's approach to cancellation authority has no basis in text, structure and purpose, or precedent". J. Stephen Kennedy wrote that the majority of the Supreme Court was sufficiently concerned with the constitutional challenges to the line item veto presented to declare the act wholly unconstitutional, instead of relying on other traditional and less sweeping ways of correcting acts of Congress. In his view, "the Court's decision sent a clear message of finality for any future use of the line item veto". Kennedy also noted that while the majority relied on a strict interpretation or literal textual reading of the Presentment Clause contained in Article I of the United States Constitution, Justice Scalia, in his dissent, "stray[ed] somewhat from his usual strict constructionist approach ... by stressing that the President's act of cancellation would only occur after satisfaction of the Presentment Clause".

Steven F. Huefner wrote that "Although the Presentment Clause analysis of the Line Item Veto Act has superficial appeal, it ultimately does not withstand scrutiny", arguing that the Court should have relied on the nondelegation doctrine in order to invalidate the Act, as it provided a superior basis for such a decision. Huefner named two main implications of the Court's refusal to use the nondelegation doctrine. First, it suggests that the Court seems unready or unwilling to alter the existing interpretation of the nondelegation doctrine. Second, the Court has shown that it is willing to rely upon alternative rationales to achieve the same result "as would a more robust nondelegation doctrine rationale". This approach is significant because in theory, such a rationale could endanger previously accepted delegations to the executive.

Roy E. Brownell II criticized the Clinton administration for its exercise of the Line Item Veto Act, charging that it should have restricted its cancellation powers only to statutory provisions that remain in the realm of national security. He argued that had the Clinton administration limited its use of the Line Item Veto Act in this fashion, it would have ensured that when the constitutionality of the Act was inevitably challenged, the challenge would have been based on terms most favorable to the Executive. Brownell suggested that a test case brought forth on the grounds of national security would have likely acknowledged the existence of "National Security Rescission", "a narrow statutory construction limiting the area of presidential cancellation power to within the field of national security. Such a result ... would have assured that the President maintained cancellation authority over a sixth of the federal budget."

Steven G. Calabresi argued that although the Court had denied this, the decision was really a "Nondelegation doctrine case masquerading as a bicameralism and presentment case". He also suggested that this decision was "the blockbuster separation of powers case of the Rehnquist years".

== Subsequent developments ==
Though the Supreme Court struck down the Line Item Veto Act in 1998, President George W. Bush asked Congress to enact legislation that would return the line item veto power to the Executive. First announcing his intent to seek such legislation in his January 31, 2006 State of the Union address, President Bush sent a legislative proposal Legislative Line Item Veto Act of 2006 to Congress on March 6, 2006, urging its prompt passage. Senator Bill Frist, Senator John McCain, and Republican Whip Senator Mitch McConnell jointly introduced this proposal.

On that same day, Joshua Bolten, the Director of the Office of Management and Budget, gave a press conference on the president's line-item veto proposal. Bolten explained that the proposed Act would give the president the ability to single out "wasteful" spending and to put such spending on hold. While the spending line-item is on hold, the president can send legislation to Congress to rescind the particular line-item. The proposal would then be considered in both houses within ten days on an up or down basis, and could be passed by a simple majority. Additionally, such proposals could not be filibustered.

When asked how this proposed legislation was different from the 1996 Line Item Veto Act that was found unconstitutional by the United States Supreme Court, Bolten said that whereas the former act granted unilateral authority to the Executive to disallow specific spending line items, the new proposal would seek Congressional approval of such line-item vetoes. Thus, in order for the president to successfully rescind previously enacted spending, a simple majority of Congress is required to agree to specific legislation to that effect.

Though the newer line-item veto proposal was much weaker than the 1996 version, it nevertheless failed to find strong support in Congress. Senator Robert C. Byrd of West Virginia called it "an offensive slap at Congress", asserting that the legislation would enable the president to intimidate individual members of Congress by targeting the projects of his political opponents. He also complained that the line-item veto as proposed would take away Congress' constitutional "power of the purse" and give it to the executive branch.

On June 8, 2006, Viet D. Dinh, Professor of Law at Georgetown University Law Center, and Nathan Sales, John M. Olin Fellow at Georgetown University Law Center testified by written statement before the House Committee on the Budget on the constitutional issues in connection with the proposed legislation. Dinh and Sales argued that the Legislative Line Item Veto Act of 2006 satisfies the Constitution's Bicameralism and Presentment Clause, and therefore avoids the constitutional issues raised in the 1996 Act struck down by the Supreme Court. They also stated that the proposed Act is consistent with the basic principle that grants Congress broad discretion to establish procedures to govern its internal operations.

The proposed Act was approved by the House Budget Committee on June 14, 2006, by a vote of 24–9. It was approved in the full House on June 22. A similar bill was submitted in the Senate, but failed to win approval. The Legislative Line Item Veto Act has therefore not become law.

== See also ==
- Line-item veto
- INS v. Chadha (1983)
- Signing statement
- List of United States Supreme Court cases, volume 524
- List of United States Supreme Court cases
- Lists of United States Supreme Court cases by volume
