= Line-item veto =

Veto on some provisions of a bill without vetoing the entire bill

The line-item veto, also called the partial veto, is a special form of veto power that authorizes a chief executive to reject particular provisions of a bill enacted by a legislature without vetoing the entire bill. Many countries have different standards for invoking the line-item veto if it exists at all. Each country or state has its own particular requirement for overriding a line-item veto.

== Countries allowing line-item veto ==
=== Brazil ===
The president of Brazil has the power of the line-item veto over all legislation (art. 84 Federal Constitution of 1988: "The President of the Republic has the exclusive powers to: (...) V.veto bills, either in whole or in part"). Any provisions vetoed in such a manner are returned to the Brazilian congress and can be overridden by majority vote (art. 66 of the Federal Constitution). An example of this came in August 2012, when Dilma Rousseff vetoed portions of a new forestry law which had been criticized as potentially causing another wave of deforestation in the Amazon Rainforest.

=== Panama ===
The president of Panama has the ability to partially veto portions of a bill.

=== Philippines ===
Article VI, Section 27 (2) of the Constitution of the Philippines says "The President shall have the power to veto any particular item or items in an appropriation, revenue, or tariff bill, but the veto shall not affect the item or items to which he does not object."

=== United States ===
==== Federal government ====
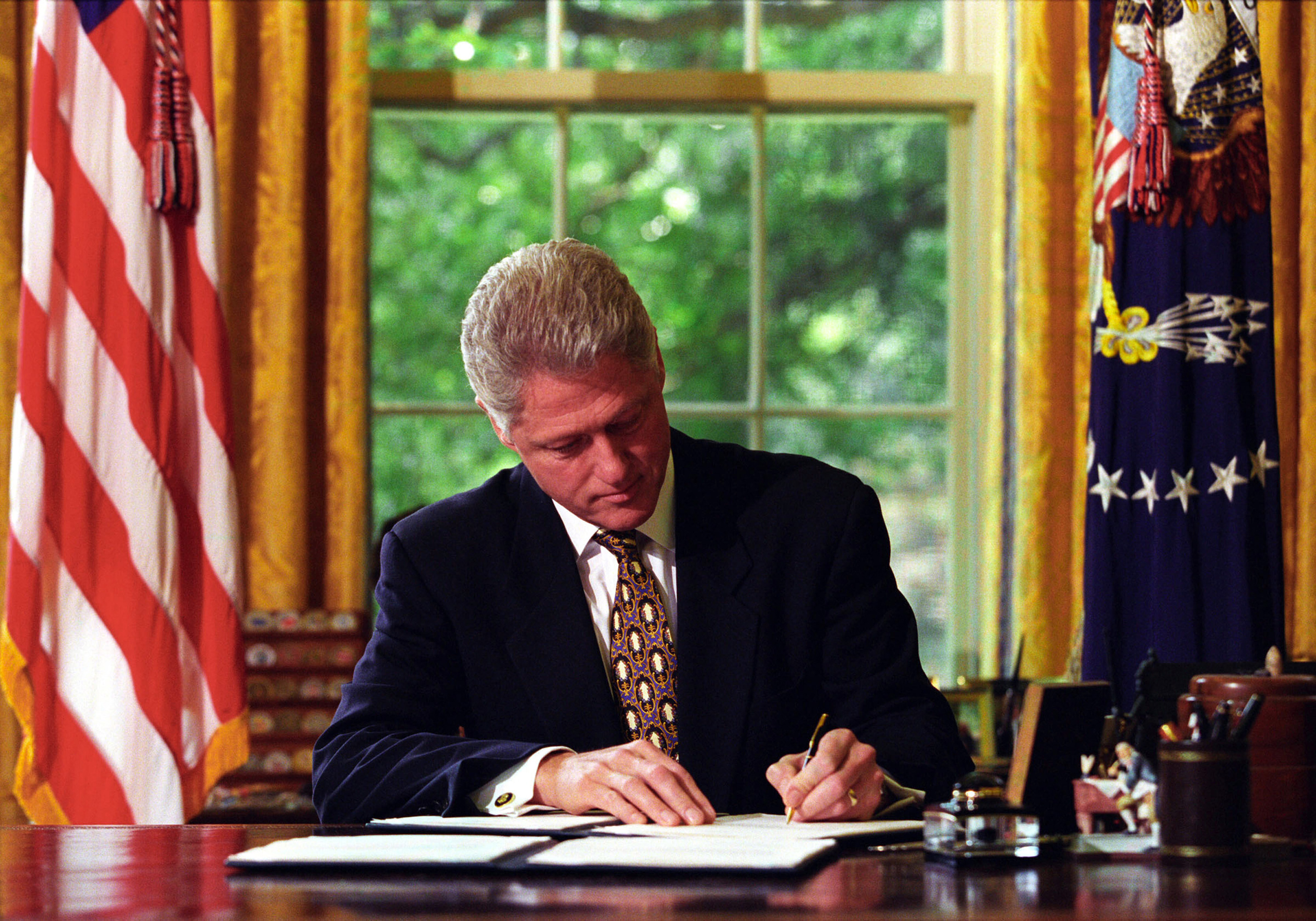
Bill Clinton signing cancellation letters related to his Line-Item Vetoes for the Balanced Budget Act of 1997, August 11, 1997.

Since before the American Civil War, U.S. presidents, including Ulysses S. Grant and Ronald Reagan, have sought line-item veto powers. It was not until the presidency of Bill Clinton that Congress passed such legislation. Intended to control "pork barrel spending", the Line Item Veto Act of 1996 was held to be unconstitutional by the U.S. Supreme Court in a 1998 ruling in Clinton v. City of New York. The court affirmed a lower court decision that the line-item veto was equivalent to the unilateral amendment or repeal of only parts of statutes and therefore violated the Presentment Clause of the United States Constitution. Before the ruling, President Clinton applied the line-item veto to the federal budget 82 times.

Since then, the prospect of granting the president of the United States a line-item veto has occasionally resurfaced in Congress, either through a constitutional amendment or a differently worded bill. Most recently, the U.S. House of Representatives passed a bill on February 8, 2012, that would have granted the president a limited line-item veto; however, the bill was not heard in the U.S. Senate. The most commonly proposed form of the line-item veto is limited to partial vetoes of spending bills.

==== Confederate States of America ====
While the Constitution of the Confederate States was largely based on the U.S. Constitution, one of the most notable departures was the granting of a line-item veto to its president. Jefferson Davis, however, never exercised the provision.

==== State governments ====
Forty-four states—all except Indiana, Nevada, New Hampshire, North Carolina, Rhode Island and Vermont—give their governors some form of line-item veto power. The Mayor of Washington, D.C. also has this power.

In some states like Wisconsin, limitations exist as to the line-item veto, including limitations on the "Frankenstein veto" and the "Vanna White veto".

=== Uruguay ===
Articles 137 and 138 of the Constitution of Uruguay allow the executive power to exercise total or partial vetoes of any bill by the Parliament.
