= Immigration and Naturalization Service v. Chadha =

1983 United States Supreme Court case

- Supreme Court of the United States

Argued February 22, 1982 Reargued December 7, 1982 Decided June 23, 1983
- Full case name: Immigration and Naturalization Service v. Jagdish Rai Chadha, et al.
- Citations: 462 U.S. 919 (more) 103 S. Ct. 2764; 77 L. Ed. 2d 317; 1983 U.S. LEXIS 80; 51 U.S.L.W. 4907; 13 ELR 20663

Case history
- Prior: Appeal from the United States Court of Appeals for the Ninth Circuit

Holding
- Congress may not promulgate a statute granting to itself a legislative veto over actions of the executive branch because such a veto is inconsistent with the bicameralism principle and Presentment Clause of the Constitution.

Court membership
- Chief Justice Warren E. Burger Associate Justices William J. Brennan Jr. · Byron White; Thurgood Marshall · Harry Blackmun; Lewis F. Powell Jr. · William Rehnquist; John P. Stevens · Sandra Day O'Connor

Case opinions
- Majority: Burger, joined by Brennan, Marshall, Blackmun, Stevens, O'Connor
- Concurrence: Powell
- Dissent: White
- Dissent: Rehnquist, joined by White

Laws applied
- U.S. Const. Art. I §§ 1, 7; U.S. Const. Art. III

Immigration and Naturalization Service v. Chadha, 462 U.S. 919 (1983), was a United States Supreme Court case holding that the one-house legislative veto violated the constitutional separation of powers.

== Background ==
Section 244(a)(1) of the Immigration and Nationality Act authorized the United States Immigration and Naturalization Service (INS) to suspend deportation of an alien continually residing in the United States for at least seven years, where the U.S. attorney general, in his discretion, found that deportation would result in "extreme hardship". After making such a finding, the attorney general would transmit a report to Congress pursuant to § 244(c)(1), and either house of Congress had the power to veto the attorney general's determination pursuant to § 244(c)(2). Chadha challenged the veto found in § 244(c)(2).

=== Case history ===
Respondent Jagdish Rai Chadha was born in the British colony of Kenya to Indian parents. Chadha was a citizen of the United Kingdom and Colonies and entered the United States on a British passport when studying in Ohio as a foreign exchange student. After Kenya's declaration of independence from Britain in 1963 he was not recognized as a legitimate citizen or resident of Kenya (as his parents were Indian) or India (as he was born in Kenya). Furthermore, his right of abode in the United Kingdom was stripped under the Immigration Act 1971 due to his lack of connection with the United Kingdom. After his non-immigrant student visa expired in 1972, none of the three countries would accept him onto their territory, rendering him de facto stateless. The INS initiated deportation proceedings against Chadha. Chadha sought to suspend his deportation, and the INS accommodated his request according to § 244(a)(1) and suspended his deportation on June 25, 1974, and transmitted a report of the suspension to Congress according to § 244(c)(2).

On December 12, 1975, Joshua Eilberg, Chairman of the Judiciary Subcommittee on Immigration, Citizenship, and International Law, introduced a resolution opposing "the granting of permanent residence in the United States to [six] aliens", including Chadha. On December 16, 1975, the resolution was submitted to the House of Representatives for a vote. The House consideration of the resolution was based on Eilberg's statement from the floor that "It was the feeling of the committee, after reviewing 340 cases, that the aliens contained in the resolution did not meet these statutory requirements, particularly as it relates to hardship", since no printed version of the resolution was ever made, nor was there debate or recorded vote.

After the House of Representatives' veto of the Attorney General's decision to allow Chadha to remain in the United States, the immigration judge reopened the deportation proceedings to implement the House order deporting Chadha. Chadha raised constitutional objections to § 244(c)(2), but the immigration judge found no authority to rule on such claims and ordered Chadha deported. Chadha then appealed to the Board of Immigration Appeals, which also found it lacked any authority to consider constitutional objections to § 244(c)(2). Chadha appealed to the Court of Appeals for the Ninth Circuit for review of the deportation order, and the INS supported his challenge to the constitutionality of § 244(c)(2). In an opinion by then-Judge Anthony Kennedy, the Ninth Circuit found § 244(c)(2) unconstitutional and ordered the attorney general to suspend deportation proceedings. The INS appealed the Ninth Circuit's decision to the Supreme Court in order to obtain a final judgment on the constitutionality of § 244(c)(2).

The House and Senate, as amici curiae, argued that the Ninth Circuit erred in holding that the resolution of the House of Representatives vetoing the attorney general's determination was constitutionally invalid. It asked the United States Supreme Court to reverse the Ninth Circuit's decision.

Congress argued that: (1) Chadha lacked standing to challenge the constitutionality of § 244(c)(2) because that section is not severable from § 244(a)(1). Therefore, if Chadha were to succeed in invalidating § 244(c)(2), his means of remedy in § 244(a)(1) would also be destroyed, and there would be no relief possible; (2) the Court did not have jurisdiction over the issue because the attorney general and INS enforced the challenged statute and thereby effectively waived their right to challenge it; (3) the action was not a genuine case or controversy, as both the original plaintiff and defendant challenged the statute without real opposition; (4) the action was a non-justiciable political question.

== Supreme Court ==
=== Majority ===
The Supreme Court affirmed the Court of Appeals' judgment. In an opinion by Chief Justice Burger, the court held that the resolution of the House of Representatives vetoing the Attorney General's determination was constitutionally invalid, unenforceable, and not binding. Congress may not promulgate a statute granting to itself a legislative veto over actions of the executive branch inconsistent with the bicameralism principle and Presentment Clause of the United States Constitution.

The court rebutted Congress's assertions as follows: (1) § 244(c)(2) of the Immigration and Nationality Act is severable from the rest of the act pursuant to the express severability clause § 406. The legislative history of § 244 supports the proposition that Congress, frustrated with the process of passing private laws to provide relief for deportable individuals, would likely not have been willing to retain the private law mechanism rather than ceding all power to the Attorney General. (2) The Attorney General and INS did not waive their right to challenge the constitutionality of the statute by enforcing the statute. (3) The action is a genuine case with adequate representation in favor of sustaining the act provided by the houses of Congress as amici curiae. (4) The case is a judicable question, not exempted by the political question doctrine; the constitutionality of a statute is a question for the courts.

The court then presented its affirmative reasoning: (5) When the Constitution provides express procedures, such procedures must be strictly observed. Two such provisions are bicameralism and presentment in the enactment of law. (6) The presentment process—especially the President's veto power—was intended by the Framers to provide a mechanism by which the executive branch could defend itself against legislative encroachment and could prevent ill-conceived policies. (7) Similarly, the bicameralism requirement was formulated in order to hinder congressional action and thereby prevent legislative encroachment. (8) The action of the House of Representatives is legislative in nature because (a) it modifies rights and duties of individuals outside the legislative branch; (b) the enactment would otherwise have required a private law, which is a legislative function; and (c) the nature of the action is inherently legislative. (9) When the Framers intended to authorize Congress to exercise power outside of the bicameral and presentment principles, it provided alternate procedures explicitly; other procedures cannot be admitted. (10) Because the action of the House of Representatives was legislative, but did not conform to the mode of action specifically stated by the Constitution for legislative action, it is therefore invalid, unenforceable, and not binding.

=== Concurrence ===
Justice Powell, in a concurring opinion, argued that to invalidate all legislative veto provisions is a serious matter, as Congress views the legislative veto as essential to controlling the executive branch, and should therefore be undertaken with caution. However, Congress's action in this case is nonetheless unconstitutional. Contrary to the views of the majority, Congress's action is not legislative in character but adjudicative, and it therefore violates the principle (called the anti-aggrandizement principle) that Congress may not expand its own power into the areas of competence of the other branches. The Constitution specifically attempted to prevent this form of aggrandizement in the Bill of Attainder Clause, Art. I, § 9, cl. 3, which prohibits Congress from undertaking legislative trials that lack the safeguards and accountability of judicial trials. For a house of Congress to force the deportation of Chadha would amount to such a legislative trial.

=== Dissents ===
Justice White, dissenting, argued that (1) the legislative veto power is absolutely necessary to modern government, as exemplified by the legislative veto powers granted in the War Powers Act of 1973. (2) The absence of constitutional provisions for alternate methods of action does not imply their prohibition by the Constitution, and the court has consistently read the Constitution to respond to contemporary needs with flexibility. (3) The legislative veto power does not involve the ability of Congress to enact new legislation without bicameral consensus or presentation to the president, but instead involves the ability of Congress to veto suggestions by the executive, a power that both houses of Congress already possess. (4) The court has allowed Congress to delegate authority to executive agencies; lawmaking does not always require bicameralism or presentation. (5) The bicameralism and presentation provisions of the Constitution serve to ensure that no departure from the status quo takes place without consensus from both houses of Congress and the President or by a super-majority vote of both houses of Congress. In this case, the deportation of Chadha is the status quo situation, and the veto by House of Representatives of an alternative suggestion of the executive branch is reasonable given the purposes of bicameralism and the Presentment Clause.

Justice Rehnquist, in a dissent joined by White, argued that it is unlikely that Congress would have promulgated § 244(a)(1) without the corresponding provisions of §§ 244(c)(1–2). Therefore, the provisions are not severable from one another, and holding one unconstitutional requires invalidating the other.

== Subsequent developments ==
Chadha became a citizen of the United States and was living in Albany, California in 1985.

Chadha increased the power of the executive branch. Legislative vetoes continued to be enacted after Chadha, although various presidents have issued executive signing statements disclaiming the unconstitutional legislative veto provisions. The consultation provisions of the War Powers Act, for example, while contested by every president since Richard M. Nixon, are usually obeyed. Some laws, such as the National Emergencies Act were amended to replace the legislative veto with a joint resolution, requiring a Presidential signature and able to be vetoed, requiring a two-thirds majority of both houses of Congress to override. Joint resolutions have proven difficult to pass over a veto, and in cases where that process was chosen the power of the President has increased greatly.

Other processes, such as fast-track legislation or sunset clauses, have taken the place of the legislative veto in other laws with greater success in obtaining similar results to the original legislative vetoes. The Contract with America Advancement Act of 1996, 5 U.S.C. Sections 801-808, allowed Congress to disapprove federal agency regulations; the effect of Chadha is that any such legislative disapproval can be vetoed by the sitting President, and is not a true legislative veto. Instead, its practical use is limited to the initial days of a new President's term following a change in Administration. Such a veto had been exercised only once, in March 2001, until 2017, when the 115th Congress under President Donald Trump passed fifteen such vetoes, overturning various rules issued under the Obama administration.

In 1984, then-Delaware senator and future President Joe Biden who served as the ranking minority member on the Senate Judiciary Committee, wrote a scholarly article in Syracuse Law Review appraising the impact of the Supreme Court decision on how the government works. The article was added to congressional records on July 26, 1985 on request of Wendell Ford.

== See also ==
- Clinton v. New York (1998)
