= Article One of the United States Constitution =

Portion of the US Constitution regarding Congress' structure and powers

Article One of the Constitution of the United States establishes the legislative branch of the federal government, the United States Congress. Under Article One, Congress is a bicameral legislature consisting of the House of Representatives and the Senate. Article One grants Congress enumerated powers and the ability to pass laws "necessary and proper" to carry out those powers. Article One also establishes the procedures for passing a bill and places limits on the powers of Congress and the states from abusing their powers.

Article One's Vesting Clause grants all federal legislative power to Congress and establishes that Congress consists of the House of Representatives and the Senate. In combination with the vesting clauses of Article Two and Article Three, the Vesting Clause of Article One establishes the separation of powers among the three branches of the federal government. Section 2 of Article One addresses the House of Representatives, establishing that members of the House are elected every two years, with congressional seats apportioned to the states on the basis of population. Section 2 includes rules for the House of Representatives, including a provision stating that individuals qualified to vote in elections for the largest chamber of their state's legislature have the right to vote in elections for the House of Representatives. Section 3 addresses the Senate, establishing that the Senate consists of two senators from each state, with each senator serving a six-year term. Section 3 originally required that the state representatives elect the members of the Senate, but the Seventeenth Amendment, ratified in 1913, provides for the direct election of senators. Section 3 lays out other rules for the Senate, including a provision that establishes the vice president of the United States as the president of the Senate.

Section 4 of Article One grants the states the power to regulate the congressional election process, but establishes that Congress can alter those regulations or make its own regulations. Section 4 also requires Congress to assemble at least once per year. Section 5 lays out rules for both houses of Congress and grants the House of Representatives and the Senate the power to judge their own elections, determine the qualifications of their own members, and punish or expel their own members. Section 6 establishes the compensation, privileges, and restrictions of those holding congressional office. Section 7 lays out the procedures for passing a bill, requiring both houses of Congress to pass a bill for it to become law, subject to the veto power of the president of the United States. Under Section 7, the president can veto a bill, but Congress can override the president's veto with a two-thirds vote of both chambers.

Section 8 lays out the powers of Congress. It includes several enumerated powers, including the power to lay and collect "taxes, duties, imposts, and excises" (provided duties, imposts, and excises are uniform throughout the United States), "to provide for the common defense and general welfare of the United States", the power to regulate interstate and international commerce, the power to set naturalization laws, the power to coin and regulate money, the power to borrow money on the credit of the United States, the power to establish post offices and post roads, the power to establish federal courts inferior to the Supreme Court, the power to raise and support an army and a navy, the power to call forth the militia "to execute the laws of the Union, suppress insurrections, and repel invasions" and to provide for the militia's "organizing, arming, disciplining ... and governing" and granting Congress the power to declare war. Section 8 also provides Congress with the power to establish a federal district to serve as the national capital and gives Congress the exclusive power to administer that district. In addition to its enumerated powers, Section 8 grants Congress the power to make laws necessary and proper to carry out its enumerated powers and other powers vested in it. Section 9 places limits on the power of Congress, banning bills of attainder and other practices. Section 10 places limits on the states, prohibiting them from entering into alliances with foreign powers, impairing contracts, taxing imports or exports above the minimum level necessary for inspection, keeping armies, or engaging in war without the consent of Congress.

== Section 1: Legislative power vested in Congress ==
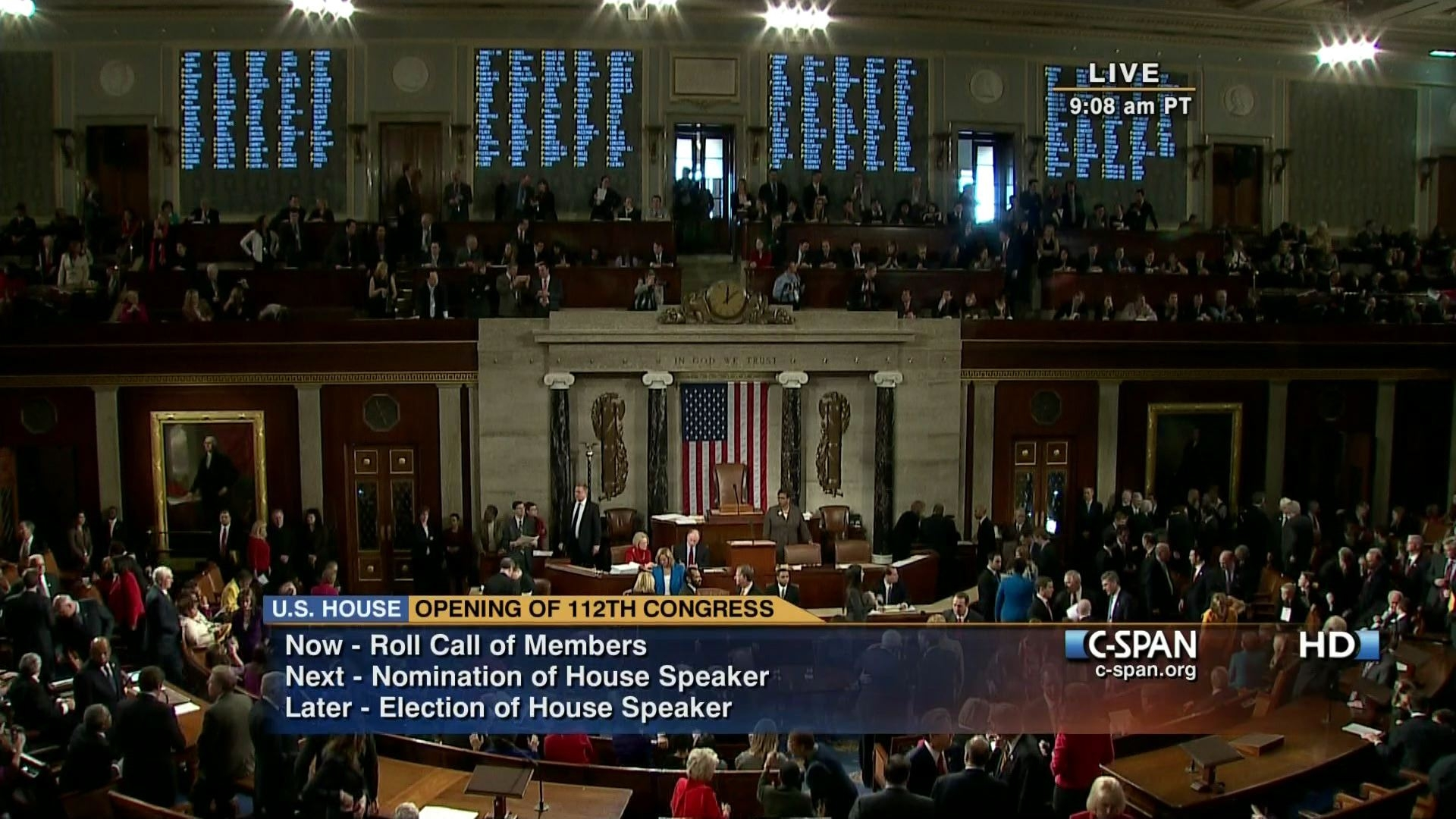
Opening of the 112th Congress in the House of Representatives chamber, January 5, 2011

All legislative Powers herein granted shall be vested in a Congress of the United States, which shall consist of a Senate and House of Representatives.

Section 1 is a vesting clause that bestows federal legislative power to Congress. Similar clauses are found in Article II, which confers executive power upon the president, and Article III, which grants judicial power to the federal judiciary. These three articles create a separation of powers among the three branches of the federal government. This separation of powers, interpreted by the federal courts as permitting each branch to exercise its own constitutional powers and no others, is fundamental to the idea of a limited government accountable to the people.

The separation of powers principle is particularly significant for Congress. The Constitution declares that Congress may exercise only those legislative powers "herein granted" within Article I (as later limited by the Tenth Amendment). It also, by implied extension, had been interpreted as prohibiting Congress from delegating its legislative authority to either of the other branches of government, a rule known as the nondelegation doctrine. However, the Supreme Court has ruled that Congress does have the latitude to delegate regulatory powers to executive agencies as long as it provides an "intelligible principle" which governs the agency's exercise of the delegated regulatory authority. That the power assigned to each branch must remain with that branch, and may be expressed only by that branch, is central to the theory. The nondelegation doctrine is primarily used as a way of interpreting a congressional delegation of authority narrowly, in that the courts presume Congress intended only to delegate that which it certainly could have, unless it clearly demonstrates it intended to "test the waters" of what the courts would allow it to do.

Although not mentioned in the Constitution, Congress has also long asserted the power to investigate and the power to compel cooperation with an investigation. The Supreme Court has affirmed these powers as an implication of Congress's power to legislate. Since the power to investigate is asserted to be an aspect of Congress's power to legislate, it has been ruled to be as broad as Congress's powers to legislate. However, it has also been limited to inquiries that are "in aid of the legislative function"; The Supreme Court has stated that Congress may not "expose for the sake of exposure". It is uncontroversial that a proper subject of Congress's investigation power is the operations of the federal government, but Congress's ability to compel the submission of documents or testimony from the president or his subordinates is often-discussed and sometimes controversial (see executive privilege), although not often litigated. As a practical matter, the limitation of Congress's ability to investigate only for a proper purpose ("in aid of" its legislative powers) functions as a limit on Congress's ability to investigate the private affairs of individual citizens; the Supreme Court has ruled that matters which the courts determine simply demand action by another branch of government, without implicating an issue of public policy necessitating legislation by Congress, must be left to those branches, due to the doctrine of separation of powers. The courts have been highly deferential to Congress's exercise of its investigation powers, however. Congress has the power to investigate that which it could regulate, and the courts have interpreted Congress's regulatory powers broadly since the Great Depression.

== Section 2: House of Representatives ==
=== Clause 1: Composition and election of Members ===
The House of Representatives shall be composed of Members chosen every second Year by the People of the several States, and the Electors in each State shall have the Qualifications requisite for Electors of the most numerous Branch of the State Legislature.

Election districts in each state have recently been required to be structured so that each elected representative represents substantially equal populations, based on court interpretations of the Equal Protection Clause of the Fourteenth Amendment, finding that, "construed in its historical context, the command of Art. I, § 2, that Representatives be chosen 'by the People of the several States' means that as nearly as is practicable one man's vote in a congressional election is to be worth as much as another's." Court involvement in this issue developed slowly from an initial practice of electing representatives at-large, until in the late 1940s and the early 1950s the Court used the "political question" doctrine in Baker v. Carr to decline to adjudicate districting and apportionment suits. The Supreme Court has held in Rucho v. Common Cause that there was no "constitutional directive" nor any "legal standards to guide" the Court in claims of unconstitutional partisan gerrymandering, and such claims today are considered nonjusticiable.

At the time of its creation, the Constitution did not explicitly give citizens an inherent right to vote. However, by stipulating that those qualified to vote in elections for the largest chamber of a state's legislature could vote in congressional (House of Representatives) elections the Framers expressed a rather explicit intent that the House was to be directly elected. Since the Civil War, several constitutional amendments have been enacted that have curbed the states' broad powers to set voter qualification standards. Though never enforced, clause 2 of the Fourteenth Amendment provides that "when the right to vote at any election for the choice of electors for president and vice president of the United States, Representatives in Congress, the Executive and Judicial officers of a State, or the members of the Legislature thereof, is denied to any of the male inhabitants of such State, being twenty-one years of age, and citizens of the United States, or in any way abridged, except for participation in rebellion, or other crime, the basis of representation therein shall be reduced in the proportion which the number of such male citizens shall bear to the whole number of male citizens twenty-one years of age in such State." The Fifteenth Amendment prohibits the denial of the right to vote based on race, color, or previous condition of servitude. The Nineteenth Amendment prohibits the denial of the right to vote based on sex. The Twenty-fourth Amendment prohibits the revocation of voting rights due to the non-payment of a poll tax. The Twenty-sixth Amendment prohibits the denial of the right of US citizens, eighteen years of age or older, to vote on account of age.

Moreover, since the Supreme Court has recognized voting as a fundamental right, the Equal Protection Clause places very tight limitations (albeit with uncertain limits) on the states' ability to define voter qualifications; it is fair to say that qualifications beyond citizenship, residency, and age are usually questionable.

In the 1960s, the Supreme Court started to view voting as a fundamental right covered by the Equal Protection Clause of the Fourteenth Amendment. In a dissenting opinion of a 1964 Supreme Court case involving reapportionment in the Alabama state legislature, Associate Justice John Marshall Harlan II included Minor v. Happersett (an 1875 case which allowed states to deny women the right to vote) in a list of past decisions about voting and apportionment which were no longer being followed.

In Oregon v. Mitchell (1970), the Supreme Court held that the Qualifications clause did not prevent Congress from overriding state-imposed minimum age restrictions for voters in Congressional elections.

Since clause 3 provides that members of the House of Representatives are apportioned state-by-state and that each state is guaranteed at least one representative, exact population equality between all districts is not guaranteed and, in fact, is currently impossible, because while the size of the House of Representatives is fixed at 435, several states had less than 1/435 of the national population at the time of the last reapportionment in 2020. However, the Supreme Court has interpreted the provision of Clause One that representatives shall be elected "by the People" to mean that, in those states with more than one member of the House of Representatives, each congressional election district within the state must have nearly identical populations.

=== Clause 2: Qualifications of Members ===
No Person shall be a Representative who shall not have attained to the Age of twenty five Years, and been seven Years a Citizen of the United States, and who shall not, when elected, be an Inhabitant of that State in which he shall be chosen.

The Constitution provides three requirements for representatives: A representative must be at least 25 years old, must be an inhabitant of the state in which he or she is elected, and must have been a citizen of the United States for the previous seven years. There is no requirement that a representative reside within the district in which he or she represents, as there is no constitutional requirement on how representatives are elected. (Note: There is no constitutional requirement on how Representatives have to be elected, nor does the constitution require election by single member districts. Multi-member or at-large districts are permitted as well, and members of the House have been elected via those manners throughout history, since Congress has the power to structure how members of the House are elected. Currently, Congress requires that all Representatives be elected from single member districts by way of the Uniform Congressional District Act.) Although representatives usually live in the district that they represent, there have been occasional exceptions.

The Supreme Court has interpreted the Qualifications Clause as an exclusive list of qualifications that cannot be supplemented by a house of Congress exercising its Section 5 authority to "judge...the...qualifications of its own members" or by a state in its exercise of its Section 4 authority to prescribe the "times, places and manner of holding elections for Senators and Representatives." The Supreme Court, as well as other federal courts, have repeatedly barred states from additional restrictions, such as imposing term limits on members of Congress, allowing members of Congress to be subject to recall elections, or requiring that representatives live in the congressional district in which they represent. A 2002 Congressional Research Service report also found that no state could implement a qualification that a representative not be a convicted felon or incarcerated.

However, the United States Supreme Court has ruled that certain ballot access requirements, such as filing fees and submitting a certain number of valid petition signatures do not constitute additional qualifications and thus few Constitutional restrictions exist as to how harsh ballot access laws can be.

Finally, although the U.S. Constitution places no restrictions on state or local office-holders simultaneously holding federal office, most state constitutions today effectively ban state and local office holders from also holding federal office at the same time by prohibiting federal office holders from also holding state and local office. Unlike other state-mandated restrictions, these sorts of prohibitions are constitutional as long they are enforced purely at the state level (i.e. against active federal office holders seeking to obtain or hold a state or local office).

=== Clause 3: Apportionment of Representatives and taxes ===
Representatives and direct Taxes shall be apportioned among the several States which may be included within this Union, according to their respective Numbers, which shall be determined by adding to the whole Number of free Persons, including those bound to Service for a Term of Years, and excluding Indians not taxed, three fifths of all other Persons. The actual Enumeration shall be made within three Years after the first Meeting of the Congress of the United States, and within every subsequent Term of ten Years, in such Manner as they shall by Law direct. The number of Representatives shall not exceed one for every thirty Thousand, but each State shall have at Least one Representative; and until such enumeration shall be made, the State of New Hampshire shall be entitled to chuse [sic] three, Massachusetts eight, Rhode-Island and Providence Plantations one, Connecticut five, New-York six, New Jersey four, Pennsylvania eight, Delaware one, Maryland six, Virginia ten, North Carolina five, South Carolina five, and Georgia three.

After much debate, the framers of the Constitution decided to make population the basis of apportioning the seats in the House of Representatives and the tax liability among the states. To facilitate this, the Constitution mandates that a census be conducted every ten years to determine the population of each state and of the nation as a whole and establishes a rule for who shall be counted or excluded from the count. As the new form of government would become operational prior to the completion of a national census, the Constitution also provides for a temporary apportionment of seats.

Originally, the population of each state and of the nation as a whole was ascertained by adding to the whole number of free persons, three-fifths the number of all other persons (i.e. slaves), but excluding non-taxed Native Americans. This Constitutional rule, known as the three-fifths compromise, was a compromise between Southern and Northern states in which three-fifths of the population of slaves would be counted for enumeration purposes and for the apportionment of seats in the House of Representatives and of taxes among the states. It was, according to Supreme Court justice Joseph Story (writing in 1833), a "matter of compromise and concession, confessedly unequal in its operation, but a necessary sacrifice to that spirit of conciliation, which was indispensable to the union of states having a great diversity of interests, and physical condition, and political institutions". Section 2 of the Fourteenth Amendment (1868) later superseded Article 1, Section 2, Clause 3 and explicitly repealed the compromise.

Following the completion of each census, Congress is empowered to use the aggregate population in all the states (according to the prevailing constitutional rule for determining population) to determine the relative population of each state to the population of the whole, and, based on its calculations, to establish the appropriate size of the House and to allocate a particular number of representatives to each state according to its share of the national population.

Since enactment of the Reapportionment Act of 1929, a constant 435 House seats have been apportioned among the states according to each census, and determining the size of the House is not presently part of the apportionment process. With one exception, the apportionment of 1842, the House of Representatives had been enlarged by various degrees from sixty-five members in 1788 to 435 members by 1913. The determination of size was made based on the aggregate national population, so long as the size of the House did not exceed 1 member for every 30,000 of the country's total population nor the size of any state's delegation exceed 1 for every 30,000 of that state's population. With the size of the House still fixed at 435, the current ratio, as of the 2020 United States census, is around 1 representative per 760,000 persons.

However, after the 1920 census, Congress failed to apportion the House, with the House using the allocations of the Apportionment Act of 1911 until after the 1932 elections, which was the date determined by Congress after it passed and the president signed the Reapportionment Act of 1929. This caused representation in the House to remain frozen for twenty years. Reapportionment of the House required Congress to pass a bill and the president to sign into law an act to reapportion the House from since the ratification of the constitution up until 1941, which is when a self-executing statute was enacted, thus making reapportionment an automatic process.

Although the first sentence in this clause originally concerned apportionment of both House seats and taxes among the several states, the Fourteenth Amendment sentence that replaced it in 1868 mentioned only the apportionment of House seats. Even so, the constraint placed upon Congress's taxation power remained, as the restriction was reiterated in Article 1 Section 9 Clause 4. The amount of direct taxes that could be collected by the federal government from the people in any State would still be tied directly to that state's share of the national population.

Due to this restriction, application of the income tax to income derived from real estate and specifically income in the form of dividends from personal property ownership such as stock shares was found to be unconstitutional because it was not apportioned among the states; that is to say, there was no guarantee that a State with 10% of the country's population paid 10% of those income taxes collected, because Congress had not fixed an amount of money to be raised and apportioned it between the States according to their respective shares of the national population. To permit the levying of such an income tax, Congress proposed and the states ratified the Sixteenth Amendment, which removed the restriction by specifically providing that Congress could levy a tax on income "from whatever source derived" without it being apportioned among the States or otherwise based on a State's share of the national population.

=== Clause 4: Vacancies ===
When vacancies happen in the Representation from any State, the Executive Authority thereof shall issue Writs of Election to fill such Vacancies.

Generally states and territories fill vacancies within the House of Representatives according to their own laws, however when vacancies within the House exceed 100 members, the speaker of the House will announce "extraordinary circumstances" have occurred, which obligates the executive authority of all states with vacancies to hold a special election within 49 days of the announcement. This election is initiated via a writ of election from the governor (2 U.S.C. § 8(b)).

=== Clause 5: Speaker and other officers; Impeachment ===
The House of Representatives shall chuse [sic] their Speaker and other Officers; and shall have the sole Power of Impeachment.

Section 2 further provides that the House of Representatives shall choose its speaker and its other officers. Though the Constitution does not mandate it, every speaker has been a member of the House of Representatives. The Speaker rarely presides over routine House sessions, choosing instead to deputize a junior member to accomplish the task.

Finally, Section 2 grants to the House of Representatives the sole power of impeachment. Although the Supreme Court has not had an occasion to interpret this specific provision, the Court has suggested that the grant to the House of the "sole" power of impeachment makes the House the exclusive interpreter of what constitutes an impeachable offense.

This power, which is analogous to the bringing of criminal charges by a grand jury, has been used only rarely. The House has begun impeachment proceedings 62 times since 1789, and twenty-one federal officials have been formally impeached as a result, including: three presidents (Andrew Johnson, Bill Clinton, and Donald Trump, twice), two Cabinet secretaries (William W. Belknap and Alejandro Mayorkas), one senator (William Blount), one Supreme Court associate justice (Samuel Chase), and fourteen federal judges. Also, notably, impeachment proceedings compelled the resignation of President Richard Nixon.

The Constitution does not specify how impeachment proceedings are to be initiated. Until the early 20th century, a House member could rise and propose an impeachment, which would then be assigned to a committee for investigation upon a formal resolution vote of the judicial committee. Presently, it is the House Judiciary Committee that initiates the process and then, after investigating the allegations, prepares recommendations for the whole House's consideration. If the House votes to adopt an impeachment resolution, "managers" are appointed by the House to serve as the prosecution team in the impeachment trial in the Senate (see Section 3, Clause 6 below).

== Section 3: Senate ==
=== Clause 1: Composition and election of senators ===
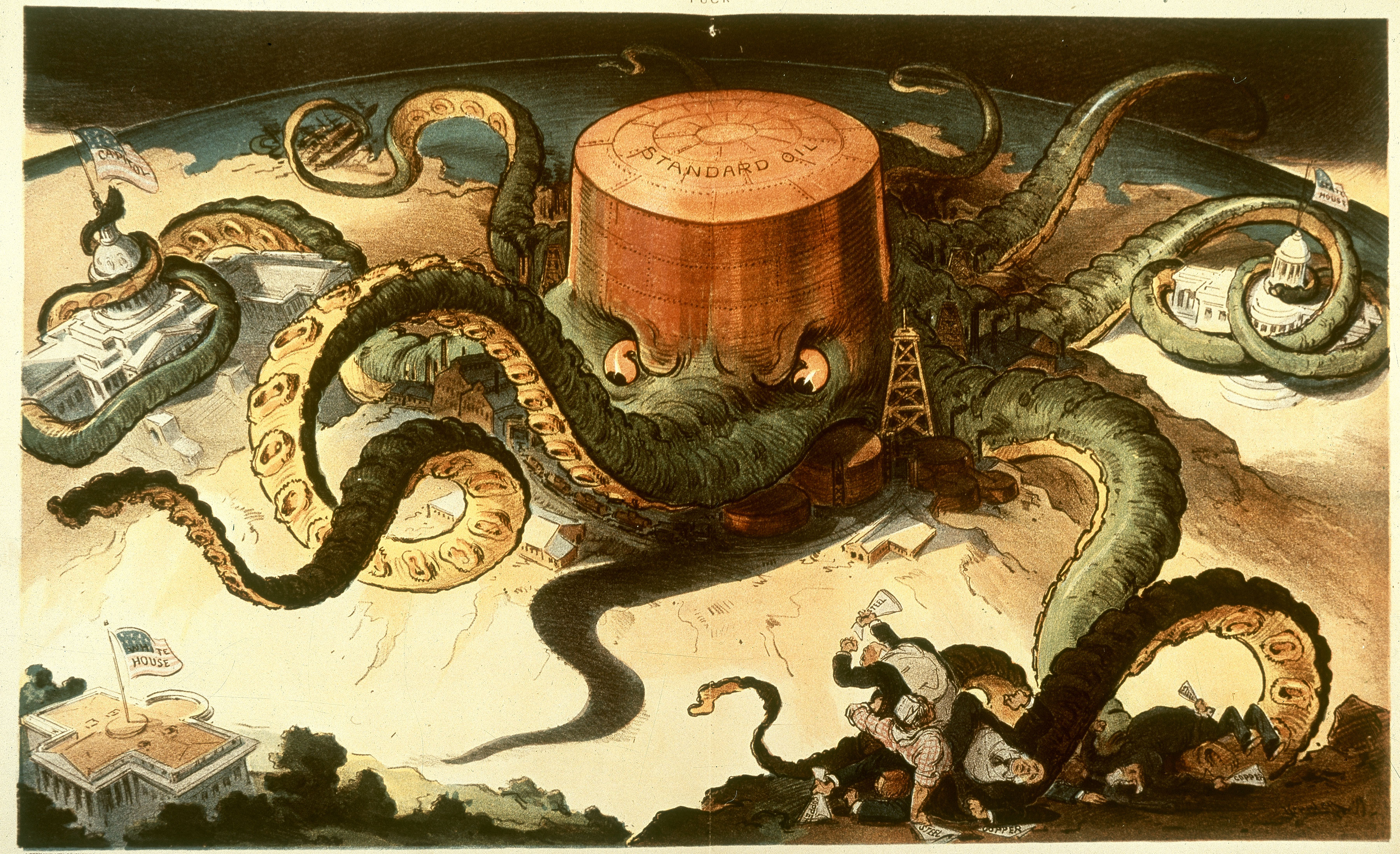
The Seventeenth Amendment, by which senators became directly elected, prevented Gilded Age monopolies from controlling the U.S. Senate (left) by corrupting state legislatures (right), who were previously responsible for appointing the states' respective U.S. senators.

The Senate of the United States shall be composed of two Senators from each State, chosen by the Legislature thereof, for six Years; and each Senator shall have one Vote.

The first Clause of Section 3 provides that each state is entitled to have two senators, who would be elected by its state legislature (now by the people of each state), serve for staggered six-year terms, and have one vote each. Through these provisions, adopted following the Connecticut Compromise, the Framers sought to protect the sovereignty and interests of states. This clause has been superseded by the Seventeenth Amendment, ratified in 1913, which, in part, provides as amended, that

The Senate of the United States shall be composed of two Senators from each State, elected by the people thereof, for six years; and each Senator shall have one vote.

Article Five specifies the means by which the Constitution of the United States can be amended. It ends by shielding three Article I clauses from being amended. The clause guaranteeing equal representation is among them. (The others are first and fourth clauses in Section 9, which were amendable after 1808.) Article Five provides that "no State, without its Consent, shall be deprived of its equal Suffrage in the Senate." Thus, no individual state may have its representation in the Senate adjusted without its consent. That is to say, an amendment that directly changed this clause to provide that all states would get only one senator (or three senators, or any other number) would be valid; however, one that provided for some basis of representation other than strict numerical equality (for example, population, wealth, or land area), would require the unanimous consent of all the states.

Denying the states their intended role as joint partners in the federal government by abolishing their equality in the Senate would, according to Chief Justice Salmon P. Chase (in Texas v. White), "destroy the grounding of the Union". This provision has been employed by those opposed to contemplated constitutional amendments that would grant the District of Columbia full representation in Congress without also granting it statehood. Their argument is that an amendment that would allow a non-state district to have two senators would deprive the states of their equal suffrage in the Senate and would therefore require ratification by all the states. Those in favor of such an amendment have argued that the states are merely entitled to equal suffrage amongst one another, and that granting the federal district Senate representation does not violate that right. Whether unanimous consent of the 50 states would be required for such an amendment to become operative remains an unanswered question.

=== Clause 2: Classification of senators; Vacancies ===
Immediately after they shall be assembled in Consequence of the first Election, they shall be divided as equally as may be into three Classes. The Seats of the Senators of the first Class shall be vacated at the Expiration of the second Year, of the second Class at the Expiration of the fourth Year, and of the third Class at the Expiration of the sixth Year, so that one third may be chosen every second Year; and if Vacancies happen by Resignation, or otherwise, during the Recess of the Legislature of any State, the Executive thereof may make temporary Appointments until the next Meeting of the Legislature, which shall then fill such Vacancies.

After the first group of senators was elected to the First Congress (1789–1791), the senators were divided into three "classes" as nearly equal in size as possible, as required by this section. This was done in May 1789 by lot. It was also decided that each state's senators would be assigned to two different classes. Those senators grouped in the first class had their term expire after only two years; those senators in the second class had their term expire after only four years, instead of six. After this, all senators from those states have been elected to six-year terms, and as new states have joined the Union, their Senate seats have been assigned to two of the three classes, maintaining each grouping as nearly equal in size as possible. In this way, election is staggered; approximately one-third of the Senate is up for re-election every two years, but the entire body is never up for re-election in the same year (as contrasted with the House, where its entire membership is up for re-election every two years).

As originally established, senators were elected by the Legislature of the State they represented in the Senate. If a senator died, resigned, or was expelled, the legislature of the state would appoint a replacement to serve out the remainder of the senator's term. If the state legislature was not in session, its governor could appoint a temporary replacement to serve until the legislature could elect a permanent replacement. This was superseded by the Seventeenth Amendment, which provided for the popular election of senators, instead of their appointment by the state legislature. In a nod to the less populist nature of the Senate, the amendment tracks the vacancy procedures for the House of Representatives in requiring that the governor call a special election to fill the vacancy, but (unlike the House) it vests in the state legislature the authority to allow the governor to appoint a temporary replacement until the special election is held. Note, however, that under the original Constitution, the governors of the states were expressly allowed by the Constitution to make temporary appointments. The current system, under the Seventeenth Amendment, allows governors to appoint a replacement only if their state legislature has previously decided to allow the governor to do so; otherwise, the seat must remain vacant until the special election is held to fill the seat, as in the case of a vacancy in the House.

=== Clause 3: Qualifications of senators ===
No Person shall be a Senator who shall not have attained to the Age of thirty Years, and been nine Years a Citizen of the United States, and who shall not, when elected, be an Inhabitant of that State for which he shall be chosen.

A senator must be at least 30 years of age, must have been a citizen of the United States for at least nine years before being elected, and must reside in the State they will represent at the time of the election. The Supreme Court has interpreted the Qualifications Clause as an exclusive list of qualifications that cannot be supplemented by a House of Congress exercising its Section 5 authority to "Judge ... the ... Qualifications of its own Members", or by a state in its exercise of its Section 4 authority to prescribe the "Times, Places and Manner of holding Elections for Senators and Representatives".

During the Constitutional Convention the Framers' debated the minimal citizenship requirement. Some delegates wanted a lengthier requirement, but eventually nine years was settled upon. The reason, as explained by Alexander Hamilton in the Federalist No. 62, was that the Senate's role in foreign affairs justified a long citizenship requirement, but that it would not be so long as to unfairly exclude new citizens who had gained public trust.

=== Clause 4: Vice president as president of Senate ===
The Vice President of the United States shall be President of the Senate, but shall have no Vote, unless they be equally divided.

Section Three provides that the vice president is the president of the Senate. Excepting the duty to receive the tally of electoral votes for president, this is the only regular responsibility assigned to the office of the vice president by the Constitution. When serving in this capacity, the vice president may cast tie-breaking votes. Early in the nation's history, vice presidents frequently presided over the Senate. In modern times, the vice president usually does so only during ceremonial occasions or when a tie in the voting is anticipated. As of August 7, 2022, there have been 294 tie-breaking votes cast by vice presidents.

=== Clause 5: President pro tempore and other officers ===
The Senate shall chuse [sic] their other Officers, and also a President pro tempore, in the Absence of the Vice President, or when he shall exercise the Office of the President of the United States.

Clause five provides for a president pro tempore of the Senate, who is elected to the post by the Senate, to preside over the body when the vice president is either absent or exercising the powers and duties of the president.

Although the constitutional text seems to suggest to the contrary, the Senate's current practice is to elect a full-time president pro tempore at the beginning of each Congress, as opposed to making it a temporary office only existing during the vice president's absence. Historically, a member of the majority party has filled this position. The Constitution does not require that the president pro tempore be a senator, but by convention, a senator is always chosen. The same goes for the speaker of the House, who is not required to be a U.S. representative, but always has been.

=== Clause 6: Trial of impeachment ===
The Senate shall have the sole Power to try all Impeachments. When sitting for that Purpose, they shall be on Oath or Affirmation. When the President of the United States is tried, the Chief Justice shall preside: And no Person shall be convicted without the Concurrence of two thirds of the Members present.

Clause Six grants to the Senate the sole power to try impeachments and spells out the basic procedures for impeachment trials. The Supreme Court has interpreted this clause to mean that the Senate has exclusive and unreviewable authority to determine what constitutes an adequate impeachment trial. Of the twenty federal officials formally impeached (Donald Trump was impeached twice) by the House of Representatives, four resigned (so that proceedings were dismissed), eight were acquitted (Trump was acquitted twice), and eight (all judges) were convicted by the Senate. On another occasion, the Senate declined to proceed with the impeachment of Senator William Blount in 1797, asserting that the House had no jurisdiction over members of the Senate; in any case, Blount had already been expelled from the Senate.

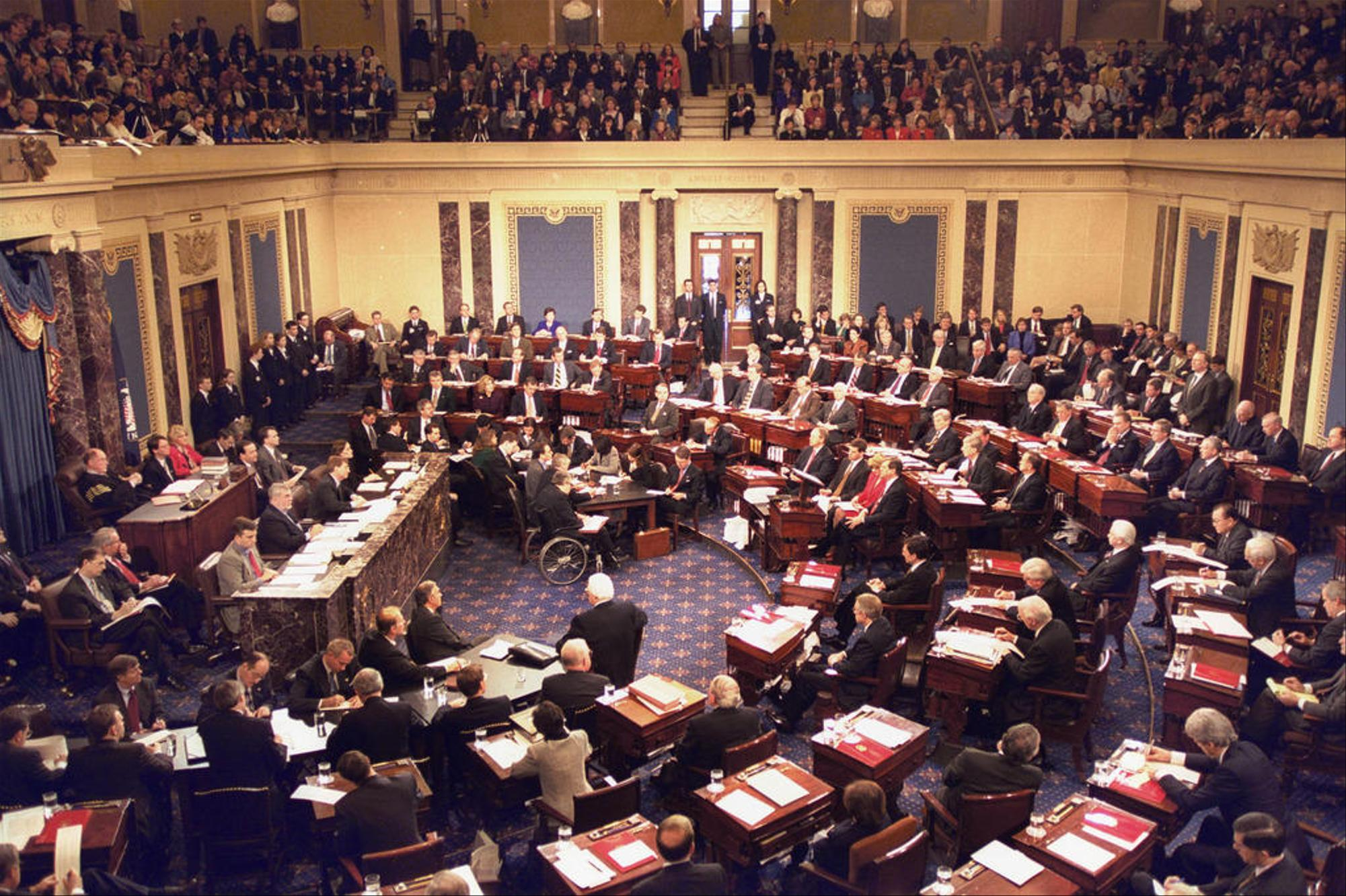
The impeachment trial of President Clinton in 1999, with Chief Justice William Rehnquist presiding

On May 29, 1787, Virginia Constitutional Convention Delegate Edmund Randolph introduced fifteen resolutions to the Convention (following a plan formulated by fellow Virginia delegate James Madison) that included a proposal to have a national judiciary conduct impeachments of national officials and to replace the Congress of the Confederation with a bicameral legislature where members of the lower house directly elected by the public would select members of the upper house. On June 7, the Convention passed a resolution moving that senators would be chosen by their respective state legislatures rather than by popular vote. On September 4, a Committee of Eleven formed on August 31 submitted a resolution to the Convention that proposed that the Senate should have the power to try all impeachments.

On September 8, the convention approved the Senate impeachment trial jury resolution, and also approved a resolution introduced by Virginia delegate George Mason to expand the scope of impeachments to include "other high crimes and misdemeanors" instead of only treason and bribery. After the approval of the resolution, James Madison spoke in opposition to having the Senate serve as the impeachment trial jury rather than the Supreme Court and introduced a failed resolution to remove the power from the Senate, while Pennsylvania delegate Gouverneur Morris argued against having the Court conduct impeachments because the Court would be too small in number.

After six states had ratified the Constitution, New York delegate Alexander Hamilton argued in Federalist No. 65 on March 7, 1788, that because of the inherently political nature of impeachment—as the process relates primarily to injuries to the body politic caused by the misconduct of public officials in violation of their public trust—prosecuting such charges would typically divide the public into factions in defense of or in opposition to the accused, that such factions would often overlap with and reinforce existing partisan factions, and that this risked the decisions in impeachment trials not being based upon actual demonstrations of innocence or guilt but instead by the comparative strength of the factions. Thus, Hamilton concluded that "A well-established court for the trial of impeachments is an object not more to be desired than difficult to be obtained in a government wholly elective."

Noting that the model approved by the convention was modeled after the impeachment process in Great Britain and that the British model had been adopted by multiple state constitutions, Hamilton argued that the Senate, composed of members chosen by state legislatures rather than popularly elected by the public, was sufficiently independent to serve as an impartial trial jury of impeachments for accusations brought by the House of Representatives, composed of members directly elected by the public. By contrast, Hamilton doubted that impeachment trials conducted by the Supreme Court, composed of unelected lifetime appointees, would have the requisite legitimacy to adjudicate the indefinite and inexhaustible range of impeachable charges brought by the House of Representatives. Instead, Hamilton argued that because a court of impeachment renders verdicts on charges "[that] can never be tied down by ... strict rules ... in the delineation of the offense by the prosecutors" and that are leveled against the "most distinguished characters of the community", the inherently political nature of impeachment trials necessitated a numerous court and "[forbade] the commitment of the trust to a small number of persons."

Additionally, Hamilton argued that because conviction in an impeachment trial did not preclude further criminal prosecution—since impeachment would not require the accused to have committed an indictable offense and its punishment would be limited to removal and disqualification from holding public office—having the Supreme Court conduct impeachment trials could subject impeached officials to double jeopardy, arguing "Would it be proper that the persons who had disposed [impeached officials of their] fame ... in one trial, should, in another trial, for the same offense, be also the disposers of [their] life and ... fortune? Would there not be the greatest reason to apprehend, that error, in the first sentence, would be the parent of error in the second sentence? ... [By] making the same persons judges in both cases, [impeached officials] would ... be deprived of the double security intended them by a double trial."

There are three constitutionally mandated requirements for impeachment trials. The provision that senators must sit on oath or affirmation was designed to impress upon them the extreme seriousness of the occasion. The stipulation that the Chief Justice of the United States is to preside over presidential impeachment trials underscores the solemnity of the occasion, and aims to avoid the conflict of interest of a vice president's presiding over the proceeding for the removal of the one official standing between them and the presidency. The latter consideration was regarded to be quite important in the eighteenth century – political parties had not yet formed when the Constitution was adopted, and with the original method of electing the president and vice president it was presumed that the two people elected to those offices would frequently be political rivals. The specification that a two-thirds super-majority vote of those senators present in order to convict was also thought necessary to facilitate serious deliberation and to make removal possible only through a consensus that cuts across factional divisions.

=== Clause 7: Judgment in cases of impeachment; Punishment on conviction ===
Judgment in Cases of Impeachment shall not extend further than to removal from Office, and disqualification to hold and enjoy any Office of honor, Trust or Profit under the United States: but the Party convicted shall nevertheless be liable and subject to Indictment, Trial, Judgment and Punishment, according to Law.

If any officer or the president or the vice president is convicted on impeachment, that person is immediately removed from office and may be barred from holding any appointed federal executive office in the future. This is purely a political remedy which "touches neither his person, nor his property; but simply divests him of his political capacity," however the convicted person remains liable to trial and punishment in the courts for civil and criminal charges. The President cannot reinstate an impeached officer with his Article II appointment power if such officers have been disqualified to hold any future federal office as part of their conviction.

== Section 4: Congressional elections and sessions ==
=== Clause 1: Time, place, and manner of holding elections ===
The Times, Places and Manner of holding Elections for Senators and Representatives, shall be prescribed in each State by the Legislature thereof; but the Congress may at any time by Law make or alter such Regulations, except as to the Places of chusing [sic] Senators.

The purpose of this clause is twofold. First, it makes clear the division of responsibility with respect to the conduct of the election of federal senators and representatives. That responsibility lies primarily with the states and secondarily with Congress. Second, the clause lodges the power to regulate elections in the respective legislative branches of the states and the federal government. As authorized by this clause, Congress has set a uniform date for federal elections: the Tuesday following the first Monday in November.

Presently, as there are no on-point federal regulations, the states retain the authority to regulate the dates on which other aspects of the election process are held (registration, primary elections, etc.) and where elections will be held. As for regulating the "manner" of elections, the Supreme Court has interpreted this to mean "matters like notices, registration, supervision of voting, protection of voters, prevention of fraud and corrupt practices, counting of votes, duties of inspectors and canvassers, and making and publication of election returns." The Supreme Court has held that States may not exercise their power to determine the "manner" of holding elections to impose term limits on their congressional delegation.

One of the most significant ways that each state regulates the "manner" of elections is through their power to draw electoral districts. Although in theory Congress could draw the district map for each State, it has not exercised this level of oversight. Congress has, however, required the States to conform to certain practices when drawing districts. States are currently required to use a single-member district scheme, whereby the State is divided into as many election districts for representatives in the House of Representatives as the size of its representation in that body (that is to say, representatives cannot be elected at-large from the whole state unless the state has only one representative in the House, nor can districts elect more than one representative). The Supreme Court has interpreted "by the Legislature thereof" to include the state governor's veto, and the initiative process, in those states whose constitutions provide it. This conclusion has been challenged, however, by the independent state legislature theory, which was rejected by the Supreme Court in their 2023 decision in Moore v. Harper.

Congress first exercised its power to regulate elections nationwide in 1842, when the 27th Congress passed a law requiring the election of representatives by districts. In subsequent years, Congress expanded on the requirements, successively adding contiguity, compactness, and substantial equality of population to the districting requirements. These standards were later not included in the Reapportionment Act of 1929, but the Supreme Court has re-imposed the population requirement on the States under the Equal Protection Clause and is suspicious of districts that do not meet the other "traditional" districting criteria of compactness and contiguity. The single member district requirement was reinforced in the Uniform Congressional District Act passed by Congress in 1967.

In 1865, Congress legislated a remedy for a situation under which deadlocks in state legislatures over the election of senators were creating vacancies in the office. The act required the two houses of each legislature to meet in joint session on a specified day and to meet every day thereafter until a senator was selected. The first comprehensive federal statute dealing with elections was adopted in 1870 as a means of enforcing the Fifteenth Amendment's guarantee against racial discrimination in granting suffrage rights. Under the Enforcement Act of 1870, and subsequent laws, false registration, bribery, voting without legal right, making false returns of votes cast, interference in any manner with officers of election, and the neglect by any such officer of any duty required by state or federal law were made federal offenses. Provision was made for the appointment by federal judges of persons to attend at places of registration and at elections with authority to challenge any person proposing to register or vote unlawfully, to witness the counting of votes, and to identify by their signatures the registration of voters and election tally sheets.

Beginning with the Tillman Act of 1907, Congress has imposed a growing number of restrictions on elections and campaign financing. The most significant piece of legislation has been the 1971 Federal Election Campaign Act. It was this legislation that was at issue in the Supreme Court's seminal decision, Buckley v. Valeo (1976), which, in the face of a First Amendment challenge, set the ground rules for campaign finance legislation, generally disallowing restrictions on expenditures by candidates, but permitting restrictions on contributions by individuals and corporations.

In addition to statutory constraints, Congress and the states have altered the electoral process through amending the Constitution (first in the above mentioned Fifteenth Amendment). The Seventeenth Amendment altered the manner of conducting the elections of senators; establishing that they are to be elected by the people of the states. Also, the Nineteenth Amendment prohibits any U.S. citizen from being denied the right to vote on the basis of sex; the Twenty-fourth Amendment prohibits both Congress and the states from conditioning the right to vote in federal elections on payment of a poll tax or other types of tax; and the Twenty-sixth Amendment prohibits the states and the federal government from using age as a reason for denying the right to vote to U.S. citizens who are at least eighteen years old.

=== Clause 2: Sessions of Congress ===
The Congress shall assemble at least once in every Year, and such Meeting shall be on the first Monday in December, unless they shall by Law appoint a different Day.

Clause 2 fixes an annual date upon which Congress must meet. By doing so, the Constitution empowers Congress to meet, whether or not the president called it into session. Article II, Section 3 does grant the president limited authority to convene and adjourn both Houses (or either of them) and mandates that it will meet at least once in a year to enact legislation on behalf of the people. Some delegates to the 1787 constitutional convention believed yearly meetings were not necessary, for there would not be enough legislative business for Congress to deal with annually. Nathaniel Gorham of Massachusetts argued that the time should be fixed to prevent disputes from arising within the legislature, and to allow the states to adjust their elections to correspond with the fixed date. A fixed date also corresponded to the tradition in the states of having annual meetings. Finally, Gorham concluded that the legislative branch should be required to meet at least once a year to act as a check upon the executive department.

Although this clause provides that the annual meeting was to be on the first Monday in December, the government established by the 1787 Constitution did not begin operations until March 4, 1789. As the 1st Congress held its initial meeting on March 4, that became the date on which new representatives and senators took office in subsequent years. Therefore, every other year, although a new Congress was elected in November, it did not come into office until the following March, with a "lame duck" session convening in the interim. This practice was altered in 1933 following ratification of the Twentieth Amendment, which states (in Section 2) that, "The Congress shall assemble at least once in every year, and such meeting shall begin at noon on the third day of January, unless they shall by law appoint a different day". This change virtually eliminated the necessity of there being a lame duck session of Congress.

== Section 5: Procedure ==
=== Clause 1: Electoral judgement; quorum ===
Each House shall be the Judge of the Elections, Returns and Qualifications of its own Members, and a Majority of each shall constitute a Quorum to do Business; but a smaller Number may adjourn from day to day, and may be authorized to compel the Attendance of absent Members, in such Manner, and under such Penalties as each House may provide.

Section Five states that a majority of each House constitutes a quorum to do business; a smaller number may adjourn the House or compel the attendance of absent members. In practice, the quorum requirement is not followed, as a quorum is assumed to be present unless a quorum call, requested by a member, proves otherwise. Rarely do members ask for quorum calls to demonstrate the absence of a quorum; more often, they use the quorum call as a delaying tactic. This clause also states that each House is the judge of the elections, returns and the qualifications of its own members. This power means that the Senate or House can conduct an investigation of an election when the losing candidate present a petition, and have the power to exclude the member if the Senate or House has judged that the election had irregularities. An example of this power being used was in 1974 when the Senate voted to declare the New Hampshire Senate seat vacant due to alleged irregularities during the 1974 United States Senate election in New Hampshire. However, the power to disqualify duly elected members is not absolute. The Supreme Court ruled in the case Powell v. McCormack (1969) that the House of Representatives can exclude duly elected members only for reasons in the Qualification of Members Clause.

Sometimes, unqualified individuals have been admitted to Congress. For instance, the Senate once admitted John Henry Eaton, a twenty-eight-year-old, in 1818 (the admission was inadvertent, as Eaton's birth date was unclear at the time). In 1934, a twenty-nine-year-old, Rush Holt, was elected to the Senate; he agreed to wait six months, until his thirtieth birthday, to take the oath. The Senate ruled in that case that the age requirement applied as of the date of the taking of the oath, not the date of election.

=== Clause 2: Rules ===
Each House may determine the Rules of its Proceedings, punish its Members for disorderly Behavior, and, with the Concurrence of two thirds, expel a member.

Each house can determine its own rules (assuming a quorum is present), and may punish any of its members. A two-thirds vote is necessary to expel a member. Section 5, Clause 2 does not provide specific guidance to each House regarding when and how each House may change its rules, leaving details to the respective chambers.

=== Clause 3: Record of proceedings ===
Each House shall keep a Journal of its Proceedings, and from time to time publish the same, excepting such Parts as may in their Judgment require Secrecy; and the Yeas and Nays of the Members of either House on any question shall, at the desire of one fifth of those present, be entered on the Journal.

Each house must keep and publish a journal, though it may choose to keep any part of the Journal secret. The proceedings of the House are recorded in the journal; if one-fifth of those present (assuming a quorum is present) request it, the votes of the members on a particular question must also be entered.

=== Clause 4: Adjournment ===
Neither House, during the Session of Congress, shall, without the Consent of the other, adjourn for more than three days, nor to any other Place than that in which the two Houses shall be sitting.

Neither house may adjourn, without the consent of the other, for more than three days. Often, a house will hold pro forma sessions every three days; such sessions are merely held to fulfill the constitutional requirement, and not to conduct business. Furthermore, neither house may meet in any place other than that designated for both houses (the Capitol), without the consent of the other house.

== Section 6: Compensation, privileges, and restrictions on holding civil office ==
=== Clause 1: Compensation and legal protection ===
The Senators and Representatives shall receive a Compensation for their Services, to be ascertained by Law, and paid out of the Treasury of the United States. They shall in all Cases, except Treason, Felony and Breach of the Peace, be privileged from Arrest during their Attendance at the Session of their respective Houses, and in going to and returning from the same; and for any Speech or Debate in either House, they shall not be questioned in any other Place.

Senators and representatives set their own compensation. Under the Twenty-seventh Amendment, any change in their compensation will not take effect until after the next congressional election. Paying senators and representatives out of the federal treasury was a departure from the practice under the Articles of Confederation, where they were paid by the state in which they were elected.

Members of both houses have certain privileges, based on those enjoyed by the members of the British Parliament. Members attending, going to or returning from either house are privileged from arrest, except for treason, felony or breach of the peace. One may not sue a senator or representative for slander occurring during congressional debate, nor may a speech by a member of Congress during a congressional session be the basis for criminal prosecution. The latter was affirmed when Mike Gravel published over 4,000 pages of the Pentagon Papers in the Congressional Record, which might have otherwise been a criminal offense. This clause has also been interpreted in Gravel v. United States, 408 U.S. 606 (1972) to provide protection to aides and staff of sitting members of Congress, so long as their activities relate to legislative matters.

=== Clause 2: Independence from the executive ===
No Senator or Representative shall, during the Time for which he was elected, be appointed to any civil Office under the Authority of the United States, which shall have been created, or the Emoluments whereof shall have been increased during such time; and no Person holding any Office under the United States, shall be a Member of either House during his Continuance in Office.

Senators and representatives may not simultaneously serve in Congress and hold a position in the executive branch. This restriction is meant to protect legislative independence by preventing the president from using patronage to buy votes in Congress. It is a major difference from the Westminster political system in the British Parliament as well as those of some other nations using the parliamentary system, where cabinet ministers are required to be members of parliament.

Furthermore, senators and representatives cannot resign to take newly created or higher-paying political positions; rather, they must wait until the conclusion of the term for which they were elected. If Congress increases the salary of a particular officer, it may later reduce that salary to permit an individual to resign from Congress and take that position (known as the Saxbe fix). The effects of the clause were discussed in 1937, when Senator Hugo Black was appointed an associate justice of the Supreme Court with some time left in his Senate term. Just prior to the appointment, Congress had increased the pension available to Justices retiring at the age of seventy. It was therefore suggested by some that the office's emolument had been increased during Black's senatorial term, and that therefore Black could not take office as a justice. The response, however, was that Black was fifty-one years old, and would not receive the increased pension until at least 19 years later, long after his Senate term had expired.

== Section 7: Bills ==
=== Clause 1: Bills of revenue ===
All Bills for raising Revenue shall originate in the House of Representatives; but the Senate may propose or concur with Amendments as on other Bills.

This establishes the method for making acts of Congress that involve taxation. Accordingly, any bill may originate in either house of Congress, except for a revenue bill, which may originate only in the House of Representatives. In practice, the Senate sometimes circumvents this requirement by substituting the text of a revenue bill previously passed by the House with a substitute text. Either House may amend any bill, including revenue and appropriation bills.

This clause of the U.S. Constitution stemmed from an English parliamentary practice that all money bills must have their first reading in the House of Commons. This practice was intended to ensure that the power of the purse is possessed by the legislative body most responsive to the people, although the English practice was modified in America by allowing the Senate to amend these bills. The clause was part of the Great Compromise between small and large states; the large states were unhappy with the lopsided power of small states in the Senate, and so the clause theoretically offsets the unrepresentative nature of the Senate, and compensates the large states for allowing equal voting rights to senators from small states.

=== Clause 2: From bill to law ===
Every Bill which shall have passed the House of Representatives and the Senate, shall, before it become a Law, be presented to the President of the United States; If he approve he shall sign it, but if not he shall return it, with his Objections to that House in which it shall have originated, who shall enter the Objections at large on their Journal, and proceed to reconsider it. If after such Reconsideration two thirds of that House shall agree to pass the Bill, it shall be sent, together with the Objections, to the other House, by which it shall likewise be reconsidered, and if approved by two thirds of that House, it shall become a Law. But in all such Cases the Votes of both Houses shall be determined by yeas and Nays, and the Names of the Persons voting for and against the Bill shall be entered on the Journal of each House respectively. If any Bill shall not be returned by the President within ten Days (Sundays excepted) after it shall have been presented to him, the Same shall be a Law, in like Manner as if he had signed it, unless the Congress by their Adjournment prevent its Return, in which Case it shall not be a Law.

This clause is known as the Presentment Clause. Before a bill becomes law, it must be presented to the president, who has ten days (excluding Sundays) to act upon it. If the president signs the bill, it becomes law. However, to propose a constitutional amendment, two-thirds of both houses may submit it to the states for the ratification, without any consideration by the president, as prescribed in Article V. If he disapproves of the bill, he must return it to the House in which it originated together with his objections. This procedure has become known as the veto, although that particular word does not appear in the text of Article One. The bill does not then become law unless both Houses, by two-thirds votes, override the veto. In overriding a veto, the votes of both houses must be done by yeas and nays, and the names of the persons voting for and against the bill must be recorded. If the president neither signs nor returns the bill within the ten-day limit, the bill becomes law, unless Congress has adjourned in the meantime, thereby preventing the president from returning the bill to the House in which it originated. In the latter case, the president, by taking no action on the bill towards the end of a session, exercises a "pocket veto", which Congress may not override. In the former case, where the president allows a bill to become law unsigned, there is no common name for the practice, but recent scholarship has termed it a "default enactment."

What exactly constitutes an adjournment for the purposes of the pocket veto has been unclear. In the Pocket Veto Case (1929), the Supreme Court held that "the determinative question in reference to an 'adjournment' is not whether it is a final adjournment of Congress or an interim adjournment, such as an adjournment of the first session, but whether it is one that 'prevents' the president from returning the bill to the House in which it originated within the time allowed." Since neither House of Congress was in session, the president could not return the bill to one of them, thereby permitting the use of the pocket veto. In Wright v. United States (1938), however, the Court ruled that adjournments of one House only did not constitute an adjournment of Congress required for a pocket veto. In such cases, the Secretary or Clerk of the House in question was ruled competent to receive the bill.

Some presidents have made very extensive use of the veto, while others have not used it at all. Grover Cleveland, for instance, vetoed over four hundred bills during his first term in office; Congress overrode only two of those vetoes. Meanwhile, seven presidents have never used the veto power. There have been 2,560 vetoes, including pocket vetoes.

In 1996, Congress passed the Line Item Veto Act, which permitted the president, at the time of the signing of the bill, to rescind certain expenditures. Congress could disapprove the cancellation and reinstate the funds. The president could veto the disapproval, but Congress, by a two-thirds vote in each house, could override the veto. In the case Clinton v. City of New York, the Supreme Court found the Line Item Veto Act unconstitutional because it violated the Presentment Clause. First, the procedure delegated legislative powers to the president, thereby violating the nondelegation doctrine. Second, the procedure violated the terms of Section Seven, which state, "if he approve [the bill] he shall sign it, but if not he shall return it." Thus, the president may sign the bill, veto it, or do nothing, but he may not amend the bill and then sign it.

=== Clause 3: Resolutions ===
Every Order, Resolution, or Vote to which the Concurrence of the Senate and House of Representatives may be necessary (except on a question of Adjournment) shall be presented to the President of the United States; and before the Same shall take Effect, shall be approved by him, or being disapproved by him, shall be repassed by two thirds of the Senate and House of Representatives, according to the Rules and Limitations prescribed in the Case of a Bill.

Every order, resolution, or vote that must be passed by both houses, except on a question of adjournment, must also be presented to the president before taking effect, just as with bills that become law.

== Section 8: Powers of Congress ==
=== Enumerated powers ===
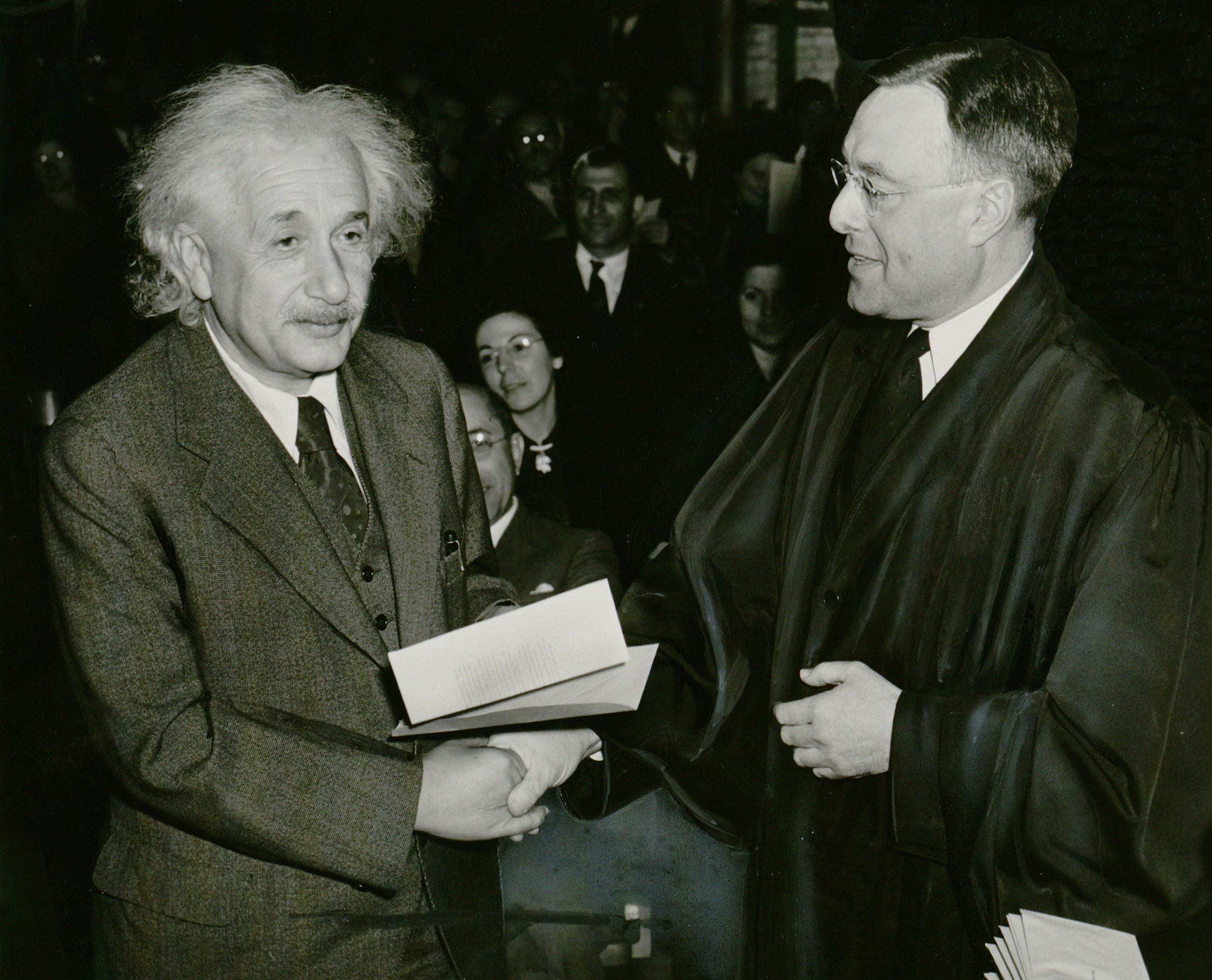
Newly naturalized citizen Albert Einstein received his certificate of American citizenship from Judge Phillip Forman on October 1, 1940.

Congress's legislative powers are enumerated in Section Eight. Its 18 clauses are, in order:

- The Congress shall have Power To lay and collect Taxes, Duties, Imposts and Excises, to pay the Debts and provide for the common defence (Note: In the hand-written engrossed copy of the Constitution maintained in the National Archives, the British spelling "defence" is used in Article One, Section 8 (See the National Archives transcription and the Archives' image of the engrossed document. Webpages retrieved on 24 October 2009.)) and general Welfare of the United States; but all Duties, Imposts and Excises shall be uniform throughout the United States;
- To borrow Money on the credit of the United States;
- To regulate Commerce with foreign Nations, and among the several States, and with the Indian Tribes;
- To establish a uniform Rule of Naturalization, and uniform Laws on the subject of Bankruptcies throughout the United States;
- To coin Money, regulate the Value thereof, and of foreign Coin, and fix the Standard of Weights and Measures;
- To provide for the Punishment of counterfeiting the Securities and current coin of the United States;
- To establish Post Offices and post Roads;
- To promote the Progress of Science and useful Arts, by securing for limited Times to Authors and Inventors the exclusive Right to their respective Writings and Discoveries;
- To constitute Tribunals inferior to the Supreme Court;
- To define and punish Piracies and Felonies committed on the high Seas, and Offences against the Law of Nations;
- To declare War, grant Letters of Marque and Reprisal, and make Rules concerning Captures on Land and Water;
- To raise and support Armies, but no Appropriation of Money to that Use shall be for a longer Term than two Years;
- To provide and maintain a Navy;
- To make Rules for the Government and Regulation of the land and naval Forces;
- To provide for calling forth the Militia to execute the Laws of the Union, suppress Insurrections and repel Invasions;
- To provide for organizing, arming, and disciplining, the Militia, and for governing such Part of them as may be employed in the Service of the United States, reserving to the States respectively, the Appointment of the Officers, and the Authority of training the Militia according to the discipline prescribed by Congress;
- To exercise exclusive Legislation in all Cases whatsoever, over such District (not exceeding ten Miles square) as may, by Cession of particular States, and the Acceptance of Congress, become the Seat of the Government of the United States, and to exercise like Authority over all Places purchased by the Consent of the Legislature of the State in which the Same shall be, for the Erection of Forts, Magazines, Arsenals, dock-Yards, and other needful Buildings;—And
- To make all Laws which shall be necessary and proper for carrying into Execution the foregoing Powers, and all other Powers vested by this Constitution in the Government of the United States, or in any Department or Officer thereof.

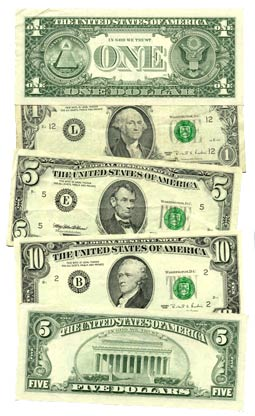
Congress's "power of the purse" authorizes taxing citizens, spending money, issuing notes and minting coins.

Many powers of Congress have been granted under a broad interpretation of Article 1, section 8. Most notably, Clauses 1 (the General Welfare or Taxing and Spending clause), 3 (the Commerce clause), and 18 (The Necessary and Proper clause) have been deemed to grant expansive powers to Congress. These three clauses have been interpreted so broadly that the federal government of the United States exercises many powers that are not expressly delegated to it by the states under the Constitution. Some point to the various social programs of the American welfare state as a prime example, and not all agree with this broad interpretation. James Madison, who wrote much of the Constitution, asserted that Congress could not exercise powers unless they were expressly granted in the Constitution. While he was president of the United States, Madison vetoed the Federal Public Works Bill of 1817, calling it unconstitutional, since in his view the federal government did not have the authority to build infrastructure.

=== Clause 1: the General Welfare Clause ===
This clause is also referred to as the Spending Clause and the Taxing and Spending Clause. It states that Congress may lay and collect taxes for the "common defense" or "general welfare" of the United States. The U.S. Supreme Court has not often defined "general welfare", leaving the political question to Congress. In United States v. Butler (1936), the Court for the first time construed the clause. The dispute centered on a tax collected from processors of agricultural products such as meat; the funds raised by the tax were not paid into the general funds of the treasury, but were rather specially earmarked for farmers. The Court struck down the tax, ruling that the general welfare language in the Taxing and Spending Clause related only to "matters of national, as distinguished from local, welfare". Congress continues to make expansive use of the Taxing and Spending Clause; for instance, the social security program is authorized under the Taxing and Spending Clause.

=== Clause 2: Borrowing Power ===
Congress has the power to borrow money on the credit of the United States. In 1871, when deciding Knox v. Lee, the Court ruled that this clause permitted Congress to emit bills and make them legal tender in satisfaction of debts. Whenever Congress borrows money, it is obligated to repay the sum as stipulated in the original agreement. However, such agreements are only "binding on the conscience of the sovereign", as the doctrine of sovereign immunity prevents a creditor from suing in court if the government reneges on its commitment.

=== Clause 3: Commerce Clause ===
Chief Justice John Marshall established a broad interpretation of the Commerce Clause.

The Congress shall have Power [...] To regulate Commerce with foreign Nations, and among the several States, and with the Indian Tribes;

The Supreme Court has seldom restrained the use of the Commerce Clause for widely varying purposes. The first important decision related to the Commerce Clause was Gibbons v. Ogden, decided by a unanimous Court in 1824. The case involved conflicting federal and state laws: Thomas Gibbons had a federal permit to navigate steamboats in the Hudson River, while the other, Aaron Ogden, had a monopoly to do the same granted by the state of New York. Ogden contended that "commerce" included only buying and selling of goods and not their transportation. Chief Justice John Marshall rejected this notion. Marshall suggested that "commerce" included navigation of goods, and that it "must have been contemplated" by the Framers. Marshall added that Congress's power over commerce "is complete in itself, may be exercised to its utmost extent, and acknowledges no limitations other than are prescribed in the Constitution".

The expansive interpretation of the Commerce Clause was restrained during the late nineteenth and early twentieth centuries, when a laissez-faire attitude dominated the Court. In United States v. E. C. Knight Company (1895), the Supreme Court limited the newly enacted Sherman Antitrust Act, which had sought to break up the monopolies dominating the nation's economy. The Court ruled that Congress could not regulate the manufacture of goods, even if they were later shipped to other states. Chief Justice Melville Fuller wrote, "commerce succeeds to manufacture, and is not a part of it".

The U.S. Supreme Court sometimes ruled New Deal programs unconstitutional because they stretched the meaning of the Commerce Clause. In Schechter Poultry Corp. v. United States (1935), the Court unanimously struck down industrial codes regulating the slaughter of poultry, declaring that Congress could not regulate commerce relating to the poultry, which had "come to a permanent rest within the State". As Chief Justice Charles Evans Hughes put it, "so far as the poultry here in question is concerned, the flow of interstate commerce has ceased." Judicial rulings against attempted use of Congress's Commerce Clause powers continued during the 1930s.

In 1937, the Supreme Court began moving away from its laissez-faire attitude concerning Congressional legislation and the Commerce Clause, when it ruled in National Labor Relations Board v. Jones & Laughlin Steel Company, that the National Labor Relations Act of 1935 (commonly known as the Wagner Act) was constitutional. The legislation under scrutiny prevented employers from engaging in "unfair labor practices" such as firing workers for joining unions. In sustaining this act, the Court signaled its return to the philosophy espoused by John Marshall, that Congress could pass laws regulating actions that even indirectly influenced interstate commerce.

This new attitude became firmly set into place in 1942. In Wickard v. Filburn, the Court ruled that production quotas under the Agricultural Adjustment Act of 1938 were constitutionally applied to agricultural production (in this instance, home-grown wheat for private consumption) that was consumed purely intrastate, because its effect upon interstate commerce placed it within the power of Congress to regulate under the Commerce Clause. This decision marked the beginning of the Court's total deference to Congress's claims of Commerce Clause powers, which lasted into the 1990s.

United States v. Lopez (1995) was the first decision in six decades to invalidate a federal statute on the grounds that it exceeded the power of Congress under the Commerce Clause. The Court held that while Congress had broad lawmaking authority under the Commerce Clause, the power was limited, and did not extend so far from "commerce" as to authorize the regulation of the carrying of handguns, especially when there was no evidence that carrying them affected the economy on a massive scale. In a later case, United States v. Morrison (2000), the justices ruled that Congress could not make such laws even when there was evidence of aggregate effect.

In contrast to these rulings, the Supreme Court also continues to follow the precedent set by Wickard v. Filburn. In Gonzales v. Raich it ruled that the Commerce Clause granted Congress the authority to criminalize the production and use of home-grown cannabis even where states approve its use for medicinal purposes. The court held that, as with the agricultural production in the earlier case, home-grown cannabis is a legitimate subject of federal regulation because it competes with marijuana that moves in interstate commerce.

=== Other powers of Congress ===
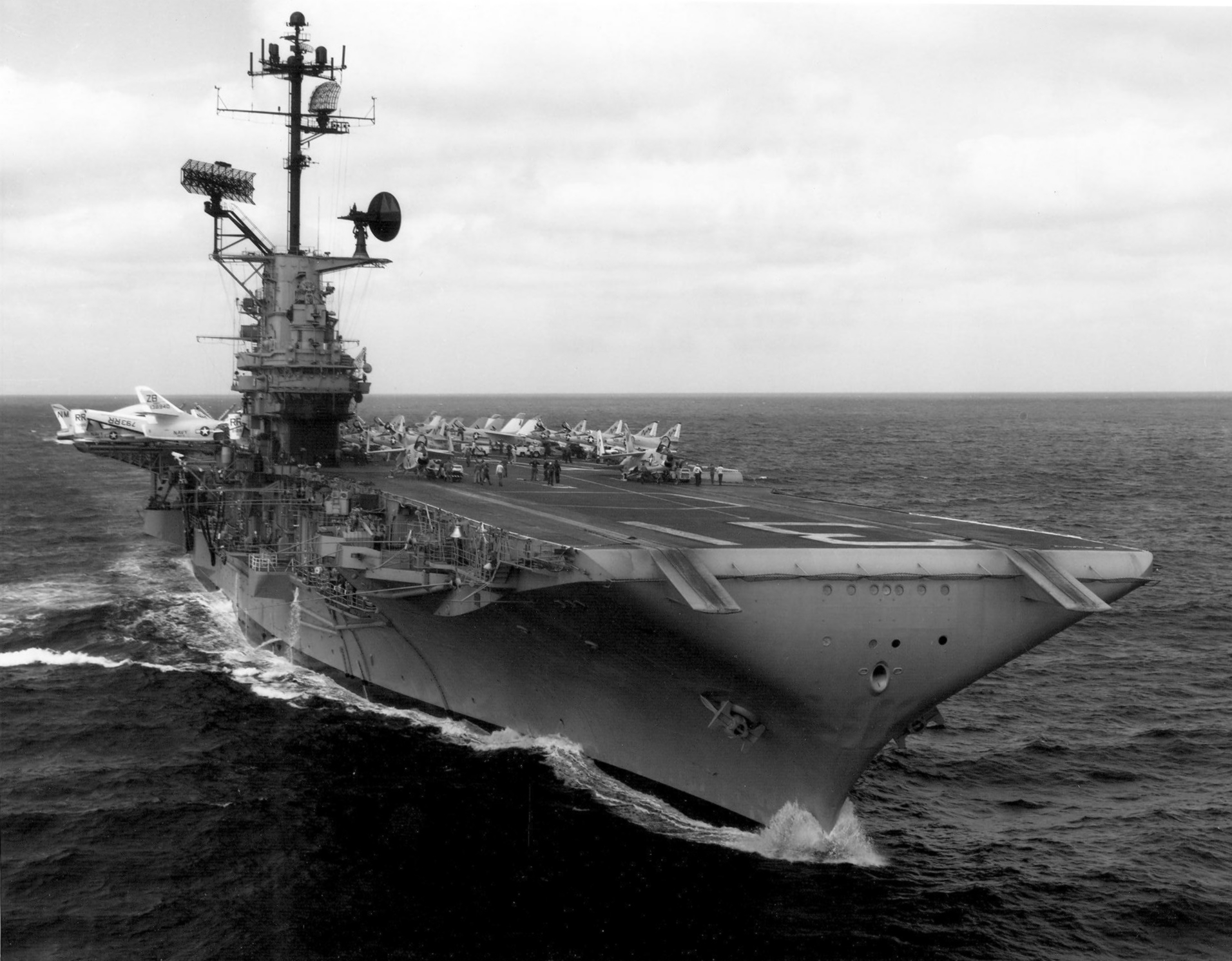
Congress authorizes defense spending such as the purchase of the USS Bon Homme Richard.

Congress may establish uniform laws relating to naturalization and bankruptcy. It may also coin money, regulate the value of American or foreign currency and punish counterfeiters. Congress may fix the standards of weights and measures. Furthermore, Congress may establish post offices and post roads (the roads, however, need not be exclusively for the conveyance of mail). Congress may promote the progress of science and useful arts by granting copyrights and patents of limited duration. Section eight, clause eight of Article One, known as the Copyright Clause, is the only instance of the word "right" used in the original constitution (though the word does appear in several Amendments). Though perpetual copyrights and patents are prohibited, the Supreme Court has ruled in Eldred v. Ashcroft (2003) that repeated extensions to the term of copyright do not constitute perpetual copyright; this is the only power granted where the means to accomplish its stated purpose is specifically provided for. Courts inferior to the Supreme Court may be established by Congress.

Congress has several powers related to war and the armed forces. Under the War Powers Clause, only Congress may declare war, but in several cases it has, without declaring war, granted the president the authority to engage in military conflicts. Five wars have been declared in United States' history: the War of 1812, the Mexican–American War, the Spanish–American War, World War I and World War II. Some historians argue that the legal doctrines and legislation passed during the operations against Pancho Villa constitute a sixth declaration of war. Congress may grant letters of marque and reprisal. Congress may establish and support the armed forces, but no appropriation made for the support of the army may be used for more than two years. This provision was inserted because the Framers feared the establishment of a standing army, beyond civilian control, during peacetime. Congress may regulate or call forth the state militias, but the states retain the authority to appoint officers and train personnel. Congress also has exclusive power to make rules and regulations governing the land and naval forces. Although the executive branch and the Pentagon have asserted an ever-increasing measure of involvement in this process, the U.S. Supreme Court has often reaffirmed Congress's exclusive hold on this power (e.g. Burns v. Wilson, 346 U.S. 137 (1953)). Congress used this power twice soon after World War II with the enactment of two statutes: the Uniform Code of Military Justice to improve the quality and fairness of courts martial and military justice, and the Federal Tort Claims Act which among other rights had allowed military service persons to sue for damages until the U.S. Supreme Court repealed that section of the statute in a divisive series of cases, known collectively as the Feres Doctrine.

Congress has the exclusive right to legislate "in all cases whatsoever" for the nation's capital, the District of Columbia. Congress chooses to devolve some of such authority to the elected mayor and council of District of Columbia. Nevertheless, Congress remains free to enact any legislation for the District so long as constitutionally permissible, to overturn any legislation by the city government, and technically to revoke the city government at any time. Congress may also exercise such jurisdiction over land purchased from the states for the erection of forts and other buildings.

==== Clause 10: Offenses Against the Law of Nations Clause ====
The Congress shall have Power ... To define and punish Piracies and Felonies committed on the high Seas, and Offences against the Law of Nations; ...

The "Offenses Clause" was developed to address the national government's inability to conduct foreign affairs effectively under the Articles of Confederation, which left it up to states to "provide expeditious, exemplary and adequate punishment ... for the infractions of the immunities of ambassadors and other public ministers". Edmund Randolph, a delegate to the Constitutional Convention, cited this arrangement as one of the major "defects" of the Articles, since it left no consistent or uniform recourse for foreign dignitaries and merchants.

At the time clause was drafted, piracy was the only universal crime that was well defined by the law of nations, and Congress soon addressed it through a federal statute in 1790. Felonies committed in international waters had to be specifically defined by Congress pursuant to the U.S. Supreme Court decision in United States v. Furlong (1820). However, determining the grounds on which Congress can define offenses against the law of nations has been more difficult, due largely to uncertainty about the meaning of the term "law of nations" and its scope.

==== Clause 18: Implied Powers of Congress (Necessary and Proper) ====
Regarding the implied powers of Congress, the Constitution specifically states all implied or additional powers permitted to the Congress are limited exclusively to the "Powers vested", to the Congress, "by this Constitution" (not "the Powers vested in it"); meaning, whatever is not expressly written or obviously implied within the Constitution cannot be inferred as being part of, nor permitted by, the Constitution. In other words, Congress cannot create additional powers for itself to wield. Any powers deemed "necessary and proper" are limited and restricted to carrying out the functions of government as prescribed within the Constitution and ensuring those functions continued operations. E.g., the Constitution states Congress shall manage the government purse through the creation of a Treasury, thus there must be a Department of the Treasury with a sub-division which accounts for every penny coming and going, pays government debts, &c.; whereas nowhere in the Constitution can it be inferred that the Second Amendment right to bear arms necessitates a Department of Alcohol, Tobacco, Firearms and Explosives (ATFE). The Department of the Treasury, along with many of its sub-divisions, is entirely Constitutional; but the Secret Service was not created until July 5, 1865 (four months after President Abraham Lincoln's assassination) specifically to combat counterfeiting, which is a task delegated to the Department of the Treasury by Congress. Congress constitutionally expanded the Secret Service's duties to include Presidential protection only after President William McKinley was assassinated in 1901. The Internal Revenue Service falls under the jurisdiction of the Federal Reserve and the Department of the Treasury is not part of the Federal Reserve, nor is the Federal Reserve part of the Department of the Treasury.

The Congress shall have Power [...] To make all Laws which shall be necessary and proper for carrying into Execution the foregoing Powers, and all other Powers vested by this Constitution in the Government of the United States, or in any Department or Officer thereof.

Finally, Congress has the power to do whatever is "necessary and proper" to carry out its enumerated powers and, crucially, all others vested in it. This has been interpreted to authorize criminal prosecution of those whose actions have a "substantial effect" on interstate commerce in Wickard v. Filburn; however, Thomas Jefferson, in the Kentucky Resolutions, supported by James Madison, maintained that a penal power could not be inferred from a power to regulate, and that the only penal powers were for treason, counterfeiting, piracy and felony on the high seas, and offenses against the law of nations.

The Necessary and Proper Clause has been interpreted extremely broadly, thereby giving Congress wide latitude in legislation. The first landmark case involving the clause was McCulloch v. Maryland (1819), which involved the establishment of a national bank. Alexander Hamilton, in advocating the creation of the bank, argued that there was "a more or less direct" relationship between the bank and "the powers of collecting taxes, borrowing money, regulating trade between the states, and raising and maintaining fleets and navies". Thomas Jefferson countered that Congress's powers "can all be carried into execution without a national bank. A bank therefore is not necessary, and consequently not authorized by this phrase". Chief Justice John Marshall agreed with the former interpretation. Marshall wrote that a Constitution listing all of Congress's powers "would partake of a prolixity of a legal code and could scarcely be embraced by the human mind". Since the Constitution could not possibly enumerate the "minor ingredients" of the powers of Congress, Marshall "deduced" that Congress had the authority to establish a bank from the "great outlines" of the general welfare, commerce and other clauses. Under this doctrine of the necessary and proper clause, Congress has sweepingly broad powers (known as implied powers) not explicitly enumerated in the Constitution. However, the Congress cannot enact laws solely on the implied powers, any action must be necessary and proper in the execution of the enumerated powers.

== Section 9: Powers denied Congress ==
The ninth section of Article One places limits on Congressional powers, as well as stating related restrictions on other branches.

The Migration or Importation of such Persons as any of the States now existing shall think proper to admit, shall not be prohibited by the Congress prior to the Year one thousand eight hundred and eight, but a Tax or duty may be imposed on such Importation, not exceeding ten dollars for each Person.

The Privilege of the Writ of Habeas Corpus shall not be suspended, unless when in Cases of Rebellion or Invasion the public Safety may require it.

No Bill of Attainder or ex post facto Law shall be passed.

No Capitation, or other direct, Tax shall be laid, unless in Proportion to the Census or Enumeration herein before directed to be taken.

No Tax or Duty shall be laid on Articles exported from any State.

No Preference shall be given by any Regulation of Commerce or Revenue to the Ports of one State over those of another: nor shall Vessels bound to, or from, one State, be obliged to enter, clear, or pay Duties in another.

No Money shall be drawn from the Treasury, but in Consequence of Appropriations made by Law; and a regular Statement and Account of Receipts and Expenditures of all public Money shall be published from time to time.

No Title of Nobility shall be granted by the United States: And no Person holding any Office of Profit or Trust under them, shall, without the Consent of the Congress, accept of any present, Emolument, Office, or Title, of any kind whatever, from any King, Prince, or foreign State.

=== Clause 1: Slave trade ===
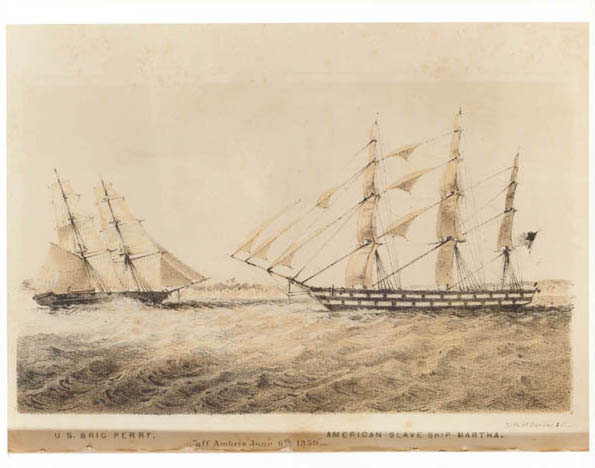
U.S. brig Perry confronting the slave ship Martha off Ambriz on June 6, 1850

The first clause in this section prevented Congress from passing any law that would restrict the importation of slaves into the United States prior to 1808. Congress could, however, levy a per capita duty of up to ten Spanish milled dollars for each slave imported into the country. This clause was further entrenched into the Constitution by Article V, where it was explicitly shielded from constitutional amendment prior to 1808. On March 2, 1807, Congress approved legislation prohibiting the importation of slaves into the United States, which went into effect on January 1, 1808, the first day of the prohibition permitted by the Constitution. This clause did see brief life outside of the slavery context in the late 1790s when the Virginia General Assembly cited it in arguing the Alien Enemies Act was unconstitutional, the federal act being used by the Adams administration to deport French immigrants the Commonwealth had itself seen proper to admit.

=== Clauses 2 and 3: Civil and legal protections ===
A writ of habeas corpus is a legal action against unlawful detainment that commands a law enforcement agency or other body that has a person in custody to have a court inquire into the legality of the detention. The court may order the person released if the reason for detention is deemed insufficient or unjustifiable. The Constitution further provides that the privilege of the writ of habeas corpus may not be suspended "unless when in cases of rebellion or invasion the public safety may require it". In Ex parte Milligan (1866), the Supreme Court ruled that the suspension of habeas corpus in a time of war was lawful, but military tribunals did not apply to citizens in states that had upheld the authority of the Constitution and where civilian courts were still operating.

For these stipulations, clauses 2 and 3 are also known as the Suspension Clause.

A bill of attainder is a legislative bill or act that legally declares a person guilty of a crime, regardless of whether a trial has been held. An ex post facto law is a law which applies retroactively, punishing someone for an act that was only made criminal after it was done. The ex post facto clause does not apply to civil matters.

=== Clause 4: Apportionment of direct taxes ===
Section Nine reiterates the provision from Section Two, Clause 3 that direct taxes must be apportioned by state populations. This clause was also explicitly shielded from constitutional amendment prior to 1808 by Article V. In 1913, the 16th Amendment exempted all income taxes from this clause. This overcame the ruling in Pollock v. Farmers' Loan & Trust Co. that the income tax could only be applied to regular income and could not be applied to dividends and capital gains.

=== Clauses 5 and 6: Restrictions on trade-related legislation ===
Furthermore, no tax may be imposed on exports from any state. Congress may not, by revenue or commerce legislation, give preference to ports of one state over those of another; neither may it require ships from one state to pay duties in another.

=== Clause 7: Appropriations and public statements of expenditures ===
All funds belonging to the Treasury may not be withdrawn except according to law. Modern practice is that Congress annually passes a number of appropriations bills authorizing the expenditure of public money. The Constitution requires that a regular statement of such expenditures be published.

=== Clause 8: Titles of nobility ===
The Title of Nobility Clause prohibits Congress from granting any title of nobility. In addition, it specifies that no civil officer may accept, without the consent of Congress, any gift, payment, office or title from a foreign ruler or state. Emoluments were a profound concern of the Founders. However, a U.S. citizen may receive foreign office before or after their period of public service.

== Section 10: Limits on the States ==
=== Clause 1: Contract Clause ===
No State shall enter into any Treaty, Alliance, or Confederation; grant Letters of Marque and Reprisal; coin Money; emit Bills of Credit; make any Thing but gold and silver Coin a Tender in Payment of Debts; pass any Bill of Attainder, ex post facto Law, or Law impairing the Obligation of Contracts, or grant any Title of Nobility.

States may not exercise certain powers reserved for the federal government: they may not enter into treaties, alliances or confederations, grant letters of marque or reprisal, coin money or issue bills of credit (such as currency). Furthermore, no state may make anything but gold and silver coin a tender in payment of debts, which expressly forbids any state government (but not the federal government) from "making a tender" (i.e., authorizing something that may be offered in payment) of any type or form of money to meet any financial obligation, unless that form of money is coins made of gold or silver (or a medium of exchange backed by and redeemable in gold or silver coins, as noted in Farmers & Merchants Bank v. Federal Reserve Bank). Much of this clause is devoted to preventing the States from using or creating any currency other than that created by Congress. In Federalist no. 44, Madison explains that "it may be observed that the same reasons which shew the necessity of denying to the States the power of regulating coin, prove with equal force that they ought not to be at liberty to substitute a paper medium in the place of coin. Had every State a right to regulate the value of its coin, there might be as many different currencies as States; and thus the intercourse among them would be impeded". Moreover, the states may not pass bills of attainder, enact ex post facto laws, impair the obligation of contracts, or grant titles of nobility.

The Contract Clause was the subject of much contentious litigation in the 19th century. It was first interpreted by the Supreme Court in 1810, when Fletcher v. Peck was decided. The case involved the Yazoo land scandal, in which the Georgia General Assembly authorized the sale of land to speculators at low prices. The bribery involved in the passage of the authorizing legislation was so blatant that a Georgia mob attempted to lynch the corrupt members of the legislature. Following elections, the legislature passed a law that rescinded the contracts granted by corrupt legislators. The validity of the annulment of the sale was questioned in the Supreme Court. In writing for a unanimous court, Chief Justice John Marshall asked, "What is a contract?" His answer was: "a compact between two or more parties". Marshall argued that the sale of land by the Georgia Legislature, though fraught with corruption, was a valid "contract". He added that the state had no right to annul the purchase of the land since doing so would impair the obligations of the contract.

The definition of a contract propounded by Chief Justice Marshall was not as simple as it may seem. In 1819, the Court considered whether a corporate charter could be construed as a contract. The case of Trustees of Dartmouth College v. Woodward involved Dartmouth College, which had been established under a royal charter granted by King George III. The Charter created a board of twelve trustees for the governance of the College. In 1815, however, the New Hampshire General Court enacted a law increasing the board's membership to twenty-one with the aim that public control could be exercised over the College. The Court, including Marshall, ruled that New Hampshire could not amend the charter, which was ruled to be a contract since it conferred "vested rights" on the trustees.

The Marshall Court determined another dispute in Sturges v. Crowninshield. The case involved a debt that was contracted in early 1811. Later in that year, the New York State Legislature enacted a bankruptcy law, under which the debt was later discharged. The Supreme Court ruled that a retroactively applied state bankruptcy law impaired the obligation to pay the debt, and therefore violated the Constitution. In Ogden v. Saunders (1827), however, the court decided that state bankruptcy laws could apply to debts contracted after the passage of the law. State legislation on the issue of bankruptcy and debtor relief has not been much of an issue since the adoption of a comprehensive federal bankruptcy law in 1898.

=== Clause 2: Import-Export Clause ===
No State shall, without the Consent of the Congress, lay any Imposts or Duties on Imports or Exports, except what may be absolutely necessary for executing it's [sic] inspection Laws: and the net Produce of all Duties and Imposts, laid by any State on Imports or Exports, shall be for the Use of the Treasury of the United States; and all such Laws shall be subject to the Revision and Controul [sic] of the Congress.

Still more powers are prohibited of the states. States may not, without the consent of Congress, tax imports or exports except for the fulfillment of state inspection laws (which may be revised by Congress). The net revenue of the tax is paid not to the state, but to the federal Treasury.

=== Clause 3: Compact Clause ===
No State shall, without the Consent of Congress, lay any Duty of Tonnage, keep Troops, or Ships of War in time of Peace, enter into any Agreement or Compact with another State, or with a foreign Power, or engage in War, unless actually invaded, or in such imminent Danger as will not admit of delay.

Under the Compact Clause, states may not, without the consent of Congress, keep troops or armies during times of peace, or enter into agreements with other states or with foreign governments. Furthermore, states may not engage in war unless invaded. States may, however, organize and arm a militia according to the discipline prescribed by Congress. The National Guard, whose members are also members of the militia as defined by 10 U.S.C. § 246, fulfill this function, as do persons serving in a state defense force with federal oversight under 32 U.S.C. § 109.

The idea of allowing Congress to have say over agreements between states traces back to the numerous controversies that arose between various colonies. Eventually compromises would be created between the two colonies and these compromises would be submitted to the Crown for approval. After the American Revolutionary War, the Articles of Confederation allowed states to appeal to Congress to settle disputes between the states over boundaries or "any cause whatever". The Articles of Confederation also required congressional approval for "any treaty or alliance" in which a state was one of the parties.

A number of Supreme Court cases have concerned what constitutes valid Congressional consent to an interstate compact. In Virginia v. Tennessee, 148 U.S. 503 (1893), the Court found that some agreements among states stand even when lacking the explicit consent of Congress. One example the court gave was a state moving some goods from a distant state to itself, for which it would not require Congressional approval to contract with another state to use its canals for transport. According to the Court, the Compact Clause requires Congressional consent only if the agreement among the states is "directed to the formation of any combination tending to the increase of political power in the States, which may encroach upon or interfere with the just supremacy of the United States".

The congressional consent issue is at the center of the debate over the constitutionality of the proposed National Popular Vote Interstate Compact (NPVIC). As of April 2026, eighteen states plus the District of Columbia have joined the NPVIC.
