= Pocket Veto Case =

- Supreme Court of the United States

Argued March 11, 1929 Decided May 27, 1929
- Full case name: Okanogan, Methow, San Poelis, Nespelem, Colville, and Lake Indian Tribes v. United States
- Citations: 279 U.S. 655 (more) 49 S. Ct. 463; 73 L. Ed. 894

Case history
- Prior: United States Court of Claims found petitioner's suit to be without legal foundation.

Holding
- The pocket veto used by President Coolidge was constitutional and valid; the pocket veto was upheld.

Court membership
- Chief Justice William H. Taft Associate Justices Oliver W. Holmes Jr. · Willis Van Devanter; James C. McReynolds · Louis Brandeis; George Sutherland · Pierce Butler; Edward T. Sanford · Harlan F. Stone

Case opinion
- Majority: Sanford, joined by unanimous

Laws applied
- Presentment Clause

The Pocket Veto Case (279 U.S. 655 (1929)), formally Bands of the State of Washington v. United States and Okanogan, Methow, San Poelis, Nespelem, Colville, and Lake Indian Tribes v. United States, was a unanimous United States Supreme Court decision that interpreted the U.S. Constitution's provisions on the pocket veto.

== Background ==
The Presentment Clause of Article I of the U.S. Constitution states that a bill that the President has not signed and not vetoed becomes law ten days (not including Sundays) after being sent to the President "unless the Congress by their Adjournment prevent its Return, in which Case it shall not be a Law."

The action of the President allowing a bill to expire without signing it after the adjournment of Congress is known as a pocket veto, which had been used by presidents since James Madison.

In 1926, the U.S. Congress passed Senate Bill 3185, allowing American Indians in Washington State to sue for damages from the loss of their tribal lands. On June 24, 1926, the bill was sent to President Calvin Coolidge for him to sign or veto. Congress adjourned for the summer on July 3. After July 6, the tenth day after the bill's passage, it had received neither a presidential signature nor a veto.

Several Indian tribes (the Okanogan, Methow, Sanpoil, Nespelem, Colville, and the Lake Indian Tribes) filed suit in the United States Court of Claims, which ruled that their case had no legal merit. The Indian tribes appealed to the Supreme Court, which agreed to hear the case. Arguing on behalf of the United States, U.S. Attorney General William D. Mitchell argued that the pocket veto was a long-established practice that had been used to decide many important cases. The case was argued on March 11, 1929, and was decided on May 27.

The case hinged on the definition of "adjournment" in Article I.

== Decision ==
In a 9–0 decision, the Court affirmed the lower court's ruling in a decision written by Justice Edward Terry Sanford. It noted that adjournment should be interpreted broadly to mean any cessation of congressional legislative activity.

The court revisited the issue of pocket vetoes in Wright v. United States, 302 U.S. 583 (1938).

== See also ==
- Washington v. Confederated Bands and Tribes of the Yakima Indian Nation
- List of United States Supreme Court cases, volume 279
