= United States v. Wheeler (1978) =

- Supreme Court of the United States

Argued January 11, 1978 Decided March 22, 1978
- Full case name: United States v. Anthony Robert Wheeler
- Citations: 435 U.S. 313 (more) 98 S. Ct. 1079; 55 L. Ed. 2d 303; 1978 U.S. LEXIS 72

Case history
- Prior: 545 F.2d 1255 (9th Cir. 1976), ref'g and rehearing en banc denied Mar. 23, 1977

Holding
- The Fifth Amendment's Double Jeopardy Clause does not prevent prosecution by both an Indian tribe and the federal government of the United States.

Court membership
- Chief Justice Warren E. Burger Associate Justices William J. Brennan Jr. · Potter Stewart; Byron White · Thurgood Marshall; Harry Blackmun · Lewis F. Powell Jr. William Rehnquist · John P. Stevens

Case opinion
- Majority: Stewart, joined by Burger, White, Marshall, Blackmun, Powell, Rehnquist, Stevens
- Brennan took no part in the consideration or decision of the case.

Laws applied
- U.S. Const. amend. V

United States v. Wheeler, 435 U.S. 313 (1978), was a United States Supreme Court case in which the Court held the Double Jeopardy Clause does not bar the federal prosecution of a Native American (Indian) who has already been prosecuted by the tribe.

== Background ==
In 1974, Anthony Robert Wheeler, a member of the Navajo tribe, was charged with disorderly conduct through the tribal justice system. On October 18, 1974, Wheeler pleaded guilty to that charge and to contributing to the delinquency of a minor. Wheeler was sentenced to 15 days in jail or a fine of $30 on the disorderly conduct, and 60 days in jail or a fine of $120 on the second charge.

On November 19, 1975, a federal grand jury indicted Wheeler for statutory rape, based on the same incident, and Wheeler moved to quash the indictment based on double jeopardy. The United States District Court dismissed the indictment. The Ninth Circuit Court of Appeals affirmed the dismissal, concluding that tribal courts and federal district courts were arms of the same sovereign.

== Opinion of the Court ==
Justice Potter Stewart delivered the opinion of a unanimous court. Stewart noted that the issue was whether an Indian tribe had the inherent sovereignty to punish tribal members for offenses. He observed that unless the power was withdrawn by treaty or statute, the tribe retained that authority. Since the Navajo tribe had never given up that authority and Congress had not withdrawn it by statute, the tribe could punish its member for a violation of law.

Since this authority was separate from federal authority, the tribe was acting as an independent sovereign. The double jeopardy clause does not prohibit prosecution by two separate sovereigns. The Court reversed and remanded the decision of the lower courts, and allowed the prosecution of Wheeler.

== A Brief History of Double Jeopardy Protections ==
There are three landmark cases that outline the evolution of double jeopardy protections integral to understanding the rejection of the double jeopardy clause in Wheeler. The first, Grafton v. United States (1907), held that a soldier who was acquitted of murder by a federal court martial could not be retried for the same offense by a civil court in the Philippines. The Supreme Court decision ultimately protected the U.S. Army member from another trial after receiving an acquittal from a military court. The second, Puerto Rico v. Shell Co. (1937), addressed whether a U.S. territory could enact its own antitrust legislation while a similar federal law existed. The Supreme Court unanimously ruled that dual legislation was valid and established that both federal and local laws derive authority from the same sovereign: the United States. This decision prevents consecutive prosecutions by federal and territorial courts, ultimately protecting the double jeopardy clause in U.S. territories. The third and most recent landmark case, Waller v. Florida (1970), held that the double jeopardy clause protects defendants from consecutive trials by states and municipalities for the same crime. In other words, it established that a city court could not bring a successive prosecution for unlawful conduct if the state had already done so.

While there are several other Supreme Court cases cited in the Wheeler Opinion, the three above illustrate the evolution of double jeopardy protections in U.S. legal history across different jurisdictions and contexts.

== 1978 Supreme Court Decisions: A Year for Indian Law ==
Though Wheeler bars double jeopardy protection from Native Americans, in the context of two other landmark cases within Indian Law, the Supreme Court decision establishes tribal sovereignty in a new way. Oliphant v. Suquamish Indian Tribe (1978) held that tribal courts have no criminal jurisdiction over non-Native people, even for crimes committed on reservations and tribal lands. Santa Clara Pueblo vs. Martinez (1978), however, confirmed that despite their plenary power, Congress did not intervene in rules and regulations regarding tribal citizenship. Wheeler established Native tribes as sovereign entities separate from the federal government. Together, these cases simultaneously affirm and restrict tribal sovereignty, and the precedents they set on tribal judicial power remain intact in the 21st century.

At the time of these Supreme Court decisions, Indigenous publications examined the implications of these cases alongside one another. Wheeler, in particular, is cited as a case in which the Supreme Court recognized the sovereignty of tribes on account of their existence prior to the establishment of the United States. However, a common concern can be found throughout multiple indigenous publications: that tribes must carefully navigate their court proceedings to prevent further erosion of their judicial powers and tribal sovereignty altogether. “By failing to succeed, as the United States Supreme Court has suggested, it could mean an additional exercise of Congress’ plenary power to further limit tribal self-government.” Additionally, there are calls amongst Native Americans to invest in their tribal councils and courts in order to prevent federal intrusion on tribal powers. Ultimately, tribal sovereignty, as established by cases like Wheeler, is still imperfect and demonstrates a continued complicated relationship with the United States government.

== Tribal Courts and Sovereignty ==
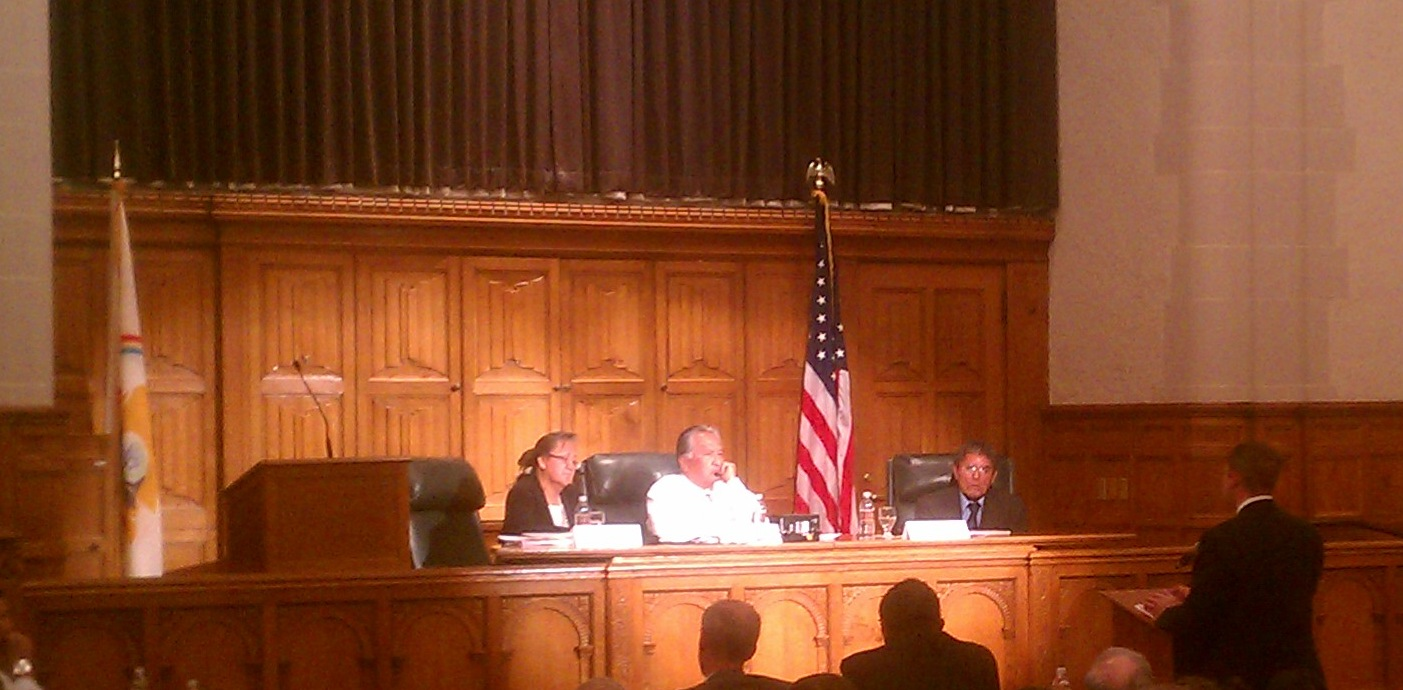
A Display of Tribal Court Sovereignty: The Supreme Court of the Navajo Nation conducting a hearing at Yale Law School on November 14, 2011.

There are several reasons why tribal sovereignty amongst tribal courts and government is so important to Native American groups. Firstly, it is a means of challenging common misconceptions that tribal courts are underdeveloped or incapable of carrying out self-government on Indian land. In reality, Navajo courts, for example, have sophisticated principled legal systems with three foundational values: hózhó (peace, harmony, and balance), k'é (kinship and unity through positive values), and k'éi (descent, clanship, and kinship). Moreover, Native Americans value tribal sovereignty despite the tension between a sovereignty that can be given and taken away. In theory, the federal government, through the Plenary Power Doctrine, maintains the ability to eliminate all Native reservations and completely dismantle tribal governments. This is perhaps why Raymond D. Austin, a former justice of the Navajo Nation Supreme Court, warns that “[Native Americans] must always be on guard... the history of American Indian and U.S. relations shows that federal Indian policies shift with the dominant non-Indian society's political mood.”
