= James v. Dravo Contracting Co. =

- Supreme Court of the United States

Argued April 26–27, 1937 Reargued October 12, 1937 Decided December 6, 1937
- Full case name: James, State Tax Commissioner v. Dravo Contracting Co.
- Citations: 302 U.S. 134 (more) 58 S. Ct. 208; 82 L. Ed. 155; 1937 U.S. LEXIS 1131; 114 A.L.R. 318

Case history
- Prior: On appeal from a three-judge panel of the United States District Court for the Southern District of West Virginia; 16 F.Supp. 527.

Holding
- A state corporate income tax did not violate the Supremacy Clause of the U.S. Constitution.

Court membership
- Chief Justice Charles E. Hughes Associate Justices James C. McReynolds · Louis Brandeis; George Sutherland · Pierce Butler; Harlan F. Stone · Owen Roberts; Benjamin N. Cardozo · Hugo Black

Case opinions
- Majority: Hughes, joined by Brandeis, Stone, Cardozo, Black
- Dissent: Roberts, joined by McReynolds, Sutherland, Butler

James v. Dravo Contracting Co., 302 U.S. 134 (1937), is a 5-to-4 ruling by the Supreme Court of the United States that a state's corporate income tax did not violate the Supremacy Clause (Article Six, Clause 2) of the United States Constitution by taxing the Federal government of the United States. It was the first time the Court had upheld a tax on the federal government. The decision is considered a landmark in the field of federal tax immunity, underpins modern legal interpretations of the Supremacy Clause in the U.S. Constitution, and established the "legal incidence test" for tax cases.

== Background ==
Dravo Contracting Company was a general contracting business incorporated in the state of Pennsylvania. It was also licensed to do business in the state of West Virginia. In 1932 and 1933, Dravo signed four contracts with the Federal government of the United States to construct locks and dams on the Kanawha River and locks on the Ohio River.

In 1933, the state of West Virginia passed a new law imposing a 2 percent gross income tax on companies doing business within the state. Subsequently, West Virginia assessed Dravo Contracting $135,761 in taxes and penalties for the income it received on the four contracts it had with the United States government.

Dravo Contracting sued to prevent collection of the tax and penalties. A three-judge panel of the United States District Court for the Southern District of West Virginia enjoined the state from collecting the tax and penalties. West Virginia appealed to the U.S. Supreme Court, which granted certiorari.

The Supreme Court heard oral argument on April 26–27, 1937. However, in a surprise announcement, Associate Justice Willis Van Devanter announced on May 19, 1937, that he would retire on June 2 (just 14 days later). Van Devanter's retirement dramatically changed the composition of the court. Van Devanter was a staunch conservative, and he was replaced by the liberal Senator Hugo Black. Justice Owen Roberts, who had been highly influenced by the conservative bloc, now began adopting a more independent, middle-of-the-road jurisprudence. In the following term, the Supreme Court overruled 19 constitutional precedents, and seven legislative precedents—and James v. Dravo Contracting Co. was one of the decisions which overruled precedent.

With Van Devanter now absent from the Court, Chief Justice Charles Evans Hughes found the Supreme Court deadlocked, and ordered a rehearing on October 12 (with Justice Black participating).

== Opinion of the Court ==
Chief Justice Hughes wrote the majority opinion for the Court, in which Associate Justices Louis Brandeis, Harlan F. Stone, Benjamin N. Cardozo, and Hugo Black joined.

Hughes argued that only two questions needed to be answered: 1) Whether West Virginia had jurisdiction over the corporation which would permit it to impose the tax, and 2) Whether the tax impermissibly burdened the operations of the federal government under the Constitution.

The jurisdictional issue proved highly complex. First, the Court had to confront how much of the work was done outside the state of West Virginia, and, second, it had to determine whether the work on the river constituted the territory of West Virginia. In determining the latter, the Court had to investigate whether work occurred on the river bed, on federal property adjacent to the river, or on private property leased by the corporation to accommodate its work for the federal government. Relying heavily on Hans Rees' Sons, Inc. v. North Carolina, 283 U.S. 123 (1931), Hughes concluded that the tax must be prorated to cover only that work performed within the borders of West Virginia.

Whether the company had done work on land owned by the federal government was a critical issue, because in 1930 the Supreme Court had held in Surplus Trading Co. v. Cook, 281 U.S. 647 (1930), that private personal property on federal land cannot be taxed by the state. Citing numerous Court precedents, Hughes noted that title to the river bed lay with the state even though the Constitution granted the federal government the power to use the river bed "for any structure which the interest of navigation, in its judgment, may require." But what about the land adjacent to the river bed which had been acquired by the federal government? Article 1, Section 8, Clause 17 of the U.S. Constitution gave Congress exclusive legislation power over such places so long as the state legislature concurred. Hughes, however, noted that the state had not granted exclusive jurisdiction to the federal government. Clause 17 also required that the construction on "exclusive" land be "needful buildings". Were dams and locks needful buildings? Hughes concluded they were, citing several lower court rulings as well as the West Virginia law allowing the United States to purchase the land. The defendant had argued that West Virginia had ceded exclusive jurisdiction to the federal government, but in a lengthy review of the legislative language Hughes argued for an interpretation which found that only concurrent jurisdiction had been granted. As to private property leased by the company in order to carry out its federal contract, Hughes perfunctorily dismissed any challenge to the jurisdiction of the state over this area.

Hughes now addressed the second issue: Did the state unconstitutionally tax the federal government? Citing extensive Supreme Court precedent, Hughes asserted that the tax was not laid directly upon the government, its property, or its officers; that the state had not taxed an "instrumentality" of the government (since the company was an independent contractor); the tax was nondiscriminatory; and the tax did not apply directly to the contract issued by the federal government. Citing several Court precedents, Hughes argued for a close reading of the facts in order to determine the tax's validity:

The application of the principle which denies validity to such a tax has required the observing of close distinctions in order to maintain the essential freedom of government in performing its functions, without unduly limiting the taxing power which is equally essential to both nation and state under our dual system.

There were no "[v]ital considerations" involved in taxing corporate income, nor did the tax affect the "permanent relations" between the federal government and its clients or citizens. The Court was not bound to decide how close or distant from the federal government a tax had to be in order to be valid, Hughes argued. The Court had already held, in Thomson v. Pacific Railroad, 76 U.S. 579 (1869), that there was a clear distinction between taxing the government or one of its instrumentalities and taxing a contract employed by the government. Hughes distinguished Pollock v. Farmers' Loan & Trust Co., 157 U.S. 429 (1895); Gillespie v. Oklahoma, 257 U.S. 501 (1922); and Metcalf & Eddy v. Mitchell, 269 U.S. 514 (1926), from the current case, in part because of the nature of the revenue stream being taxed (bond income, for example, rather than a payment under a government contract) and because of the local (rather than interstate) nature of the work done.

The heart of the taxation argument, Hughes finally concluded, rested on the contention that the business would automatically pass the cost of the tax on to the federal government, thus hindering the government in the provision of goods and services. That assumption is false, Hughes asserted, and furthermore the Dravo Contracting had already stipulated that it had not done so in the instant case (nor had it passed on the cost of property, unemployment, or other taxes—even though it knew about them ahead of time).

But even if the tax had been passed on to the federal government, Hughes concluded that it was incidental. Relying heavily on Trinityfarm Construction Co. v. Grosjean, 291 U.S. 466 (1934), Hughes found the 2 percent gross income tax imposed a burden on the federal government that was inconsequential and remote. Even if the state imposed a tax of 25 or even 50 percent, creating an immediate, direct, consequential burden, Congress had the legislative power to ensure that such a tax did not hinder or unduly burden the federal government.

The majority upheld the validity of the West Virginia tax, and reversed.

=== Dissent ===
Associate Justice James Clark McReynolds dissented, and was joined by Associate Justices George Sutherland, Pierce Butler, and Owen Roberts.

McReynolds was deeply concerned about the willingness of the majority to cast aside stare decisis and overrule precedent. "The judgment seems to me to overrule, sub silentio, a century of precedents, and to leave the application of the rule uncertain and unpredictable."

The dissent also took issue with most of the majority's conclusions. Federal immunity from taxation stemmed not from the common law but from the federal nature of the American system of government, he said. He admitted that Dravo Contracting was not an instrumentality of the federal government, but concluded that the tax did burden the government. Citing Telegraph Company v. Texas, 105 U.S. 460 (1881); Western Union Tel. Co. v. Attorney General, 125 U.S. 530 (1888); and Massachusetts v. Western Union Tel. Co., 141 U.S. 40 (1891), McReynolds noted that none of these cases turned on the unique contractual relationship between the private company and the government (as the majority had distinguished them) but rather on the mere fact that a tax was laid on a corporation engaged in carrying out the duties assigned to it by the federal government under its constitutional mandates. The Court had long held, he claimed, that taxes (such as an estate tax on an estate that held government bonds) which only indirectly impinged on the relationship between the federal government and a private entity were valid. But if a tax on the contract itself were permitted, there would be no end to unlimited taxation on the federal government, he warned.

McReynolds rejected the government's proposed "interference" test as unworkable. The majority's test he also rejected, arguing that no tax, no matter how onerous, could ever truly burden the vast resources of the federal government. McReynolds further argued that none of the cases cited by the majority supported the majority's opinion, as they were decided narrowly and the facts in each case were so unlike the facts in the instant case that they were inapplicable. The dissent agreed that it is often difficult to determine whether a tax is laid on a company's general operations (which is valid) or on the specific transaction with the federal government (which is not valid), the majority's emphasis on the independent contractor nature of the company was misplaced since every private company is an independent contractor to the federal government.

The government had argued that the tax was nondiscriminatory, and so did not unduly burden the federal government more than any buyer of goods and services. But the dissent pointed out that many taxes invalidated by the Court in the past were universal in nature, and this argument was unavailing.

The government had argued, and the majority had agreed, that the tax was not burdensome. But McReynolds concluded that this flew in the face of all previous precedent: A tax was a tax, no matter how light or heavy, and taxes on the federal government were invalid. While the federal government has the right to waive its immunity, this did not mean that all taxes on the federal government were automatically valid until the government asserted its immunity, McReynolds said. This was exactly what the majority had implied, and he rejected that argument.

McReynolds found the majority's reliance on the local nature of the transactions unable to support its conclusions. The interstate nature of the transaction (or lack thereof) did not matter; the tax was on the federal government, and none of the Court's previous decisions had distinguished interstate from local commerce.

McReynolds would have overturned the tax as unconstitutional.

== Subsequent developments ==
McCulloch v. Maryland, 17 U.S. 316 (1819), was one of the first landmark decisions of the Supreme Court. The case invalidated a Maryland state tax on bonds issued by the Second Bank of the United States which had not been issued by a Maryland bank. More importantly, however, the case established two fundamental principles of American constitutional law: 1) The Constitution grants implied powers to the federal government powers which are not explicitly stated in the Constitution but which must be granted to it in order for its explicit powers to be exercised, and 2) States may not impede the federal government in the proper carrying out of its duties. Although the Maryland tax was clearly designed to impede the federal government (Maryland had strongly opposed the creation of the Second Bank of the United States), the Supreme Court subsequently extended McCulloch over the next century to all taxes imposed on the federal government—whether they impeded the federal government or not. The Court fashioned what came to be known as the "economic incidence test," under which any state tax that placed any economic burden whatsoever on the federal government was constitutionally invalid.

McCulloch v. Maryland and Osborn v. Bank of the United States, 22 U.S. 738 (1824), had both established that states could not levy taxes on the federal government. But James v. Dravo Contracting Co. established the "legal incidence test," under which the economic impact of the tax was not the critical point but whether the tax was levied statutorily on the federal government or not. In Dravo, the Court for the first time held that the state taxes were constitutionally permissible so long as the tax was laid on an instrumentality of the federal government (such as a contractor) or was only indirectly affected economically (e.g., the tax raised the cost of materials).

The Supreme Court's upholding of the West Virginia tax in James v. Dravo Contracting Co. would later be expanded to state income taxes on federal workers in Graves v. New York ex rel. O'Keefe 306 U.S. 466 (1939), state sales taxes in Alabama v. King & Boozer, 314 U.S. 1 (1941), and use taxes in Curry v. United States, 314 U.S. 14 (1941). Both cases also used the "legal incidence test." The Supreme Court also later expanded the rationale for upholding state taxes on companies doing business with the federal government in two cases. In United States v. Detroit, 355 U.S. 473 (1958), the Court held that private, for-profit companies should not gain tax-exempt status merely because they do business with the federal government. And in United States v. New Mexico, 455 U.S. 720 (1982), the Court enunciated a general policy of upholding taxes against private parties doing business with the federal government absent a specific constitutional or legislative mandate.

However, in Kern-Limerick, Inc. v. Scurlock, 347 U.S. 110 (1954), the Supreme Court held that when a contractor was merely the federal government's purchasing agent, the legal incidence of the tax fell on the United States and hence the tax was invalid. Further rulings by the Supreme Court, however, indicated that Kern-Limerick has extremely limited implications for Supremacy Clause jurisprudence and the ruling is limited to the facts in that case. States countered by imposing use taxes on corporations instead, and the Supreme Court upheld such taxes in United States v. Boyd, 378 U.S. 39 (1964.) The Court also held in United States v. California, 507 U.S. 746 (1993), that the mere fact that the United States reimburses a contractor for payment of state taxes does not violate the legal incidence test.

The "legal incidence test" has had important repercussions for case law governing Native American tribes. The Supreme Court has repeatedly affirmed that states have no power to tax Native American tribes or their members on tribal lands. The Court has upheld such taxes only when they fall on non-Indians or Indians who are not tribal members and who are on tribal land, or if the tax is otherwise supported by federal law (such as federal taxes on cigarettes or motor fuels).

== Sources ==
- Ballati, Deborah. Privatizing Governmental Functions. New York: Law Journal Press, 2001.
- Barsh, Russel Lawrence and Henderson, James Youngblood. The Road: Indian Tribes and Political Liberty. Berkeley, Calif.: University of California Press, 1980.
- Brauch, John J. "Immunity of Military Exchanges From Federal, State and Local Taxes." United States Air Force JAG Law Review. 9:2 (March–April 1967).
- CCH Incorporated. U.S. Master Sales and Use Tax Guide. Chicago, Ill.: CCH, 2008.
- Drahozal, Christopher R. The Supremacy Clause: A Reference Guide to the United States Constitution. Westport, Conn.: Praeger, 2004.
- Duthu, N. Bruce. American Indians and the Law. New York: Viking, 2008.
- Ely Jr., James W. Reform and Regulation of Property Rights. Reprint ed. Florence, Ky.: Routledge, 1997.
- Emanuel, Steven. Constitutional Law. New York: Aspen Publishers, 2008.
- Jackson, Percival E. Dissent in the Supreme Court: A chronology. Norman, Okla.: University of Oklahoma Press, 1969.
- Schultz, David A. Encyclopedia of the United States Constitution. New York: Facts On File, 2009.
