= List of United States Supreme Court cases, volume 302 =

Supreme Court of the United States
- Interactive map of Supreme Court of the United States
- 38°53′26″N 77°00′16″W
- Established: March 4, 1789; 236 years ago
- Location: Washington, D.C.
- Coordinates: 38°53′26″N 77°00′16″W
- Composition method: Presidential nomination with Senate confirmation
- Authorised by: Constitution of the United States, Art. III, § 1
- Judge term length: life tenure, subject to impeachment and removal
- Number of positions: 9 (by statute)
- Website: supremecourt.gov

This is a list of cases reported in volume 302 of United States Reports, decided by the Supreme Court of the United States in 1937 and 1938.

== Justices of the Supreme Court at the time of volume 302 U.S. ==
The Supreme Court is established by Article III, Section 1 of the Constitution of the United States, which says: "The judicial Power of the United States, shall be vested in one supreme Court . . .". The size of the Court is not specified; the Constitution leaves it to Congress to set the number of justices. Under the Judiciary Act of 1789 Congress originally fixed the number of justices at six (one chief justice and five associate justices). Since 1789 Congress has varied the size of the Court from six to seven, nine, ten, and back to nine justices (always including one chief justice).

When the cases in volume 302 were decided the Court comprised the following nine members:

Portrait	Justice	Office	Home State	Succeeded	Date confirmed by the Senate (Vote)	Tenure on Supreme Court
	Charles Evans Hughes	Chief Justice	New York	William Howard Taft	February 13, 1930 (52–26)	February 24, 1930 – June 30, 1941 (Retired)
	James Clark McReynolds	Associate Justice	Tennessee	Horace Harmon Lurton	August 29, 1914 (44–6)	October 12, 1914 – January 31, 1941 (Retired)
	Louis Brandeis	Associate Justice	Massachusetts	Joseph Rucker Lamar	June 1, 1916 (47–22)	June 5, 1916 – February 13, 1939 (Retired)
	George Sutherland	Associate Justice	Utah	John Hessin Clarke	September 5, 1922 (Acclamation)	October 2, 1922 – January 17, 1938 (Retired)
	Pierce Butler	Associate Justice	Minnesota	William R. Day	December 21, 1922 (61–8)	January 2, 1923 – November 16, 1939 (Died)
	Harlan F. Stone	Associate Justice	New York	Joseph McKenna	February 5, 1925 (71–6)	March 2, 1925 – July 2, 1941 (Continued as chief justice)
	Owen Roberts	Associate Justice	Pennsylvania	Edward Terry Sanford	May 20, 1930 (Acclamation)	June 2, 1930 – July 31, 1945 (Resigned)
	Benjamin N. Cardozo	Associate Justice	New York	Oliver Wendell Holmes Jr.	February 24, 1932 (Acclamation)	March 14, 1932 – July 9, 1938 (Died)
	Hugo Black	Associate Justice	Alabama	Willis Van Devanter	August 17, 1937 (63–16)	August 19, 1937 – September 17, 1971 (Retired)

== Notable Cases in 302 U.S. ==
=== Bogardus v. Commissioner of Internal Revenue ===
In Bogardus v. Commissioner of Internal Revenue, 302 U.S. 34 (1937), the Supreme Court held that a distribution of money by a corporation to the company's past and present employees who had no current ties with the corporation, in recognition of their past service, was a non-taxable gift and not "compensation for personal services".

=== James, State Tax Commissioner v. Dravo Contracting Company ===
In James, State Tax Commissioner v. Dravo Contracting Company, 302 U.S. 134 (1937), the Supreme Court held that a state's corporate income tax did not violate the Supremacy Clause (Article Six, Clause 2) of the United States Constitution by taxing the Federal government of the United States. It was the first time the Court had upheld a tax on the federal government. The decision is considered a landmark in the field of federal tax immunity, underpins modern legal interpretations of the Supremacy Clause in the U.S. Constitution, and established the "legal incidence test" for tax cases.

=== Puerto Rico v. Shell Company (P.R.), Ltd. ===
Puerto Rico v. Shell Company (P.R.), Ltd., 302 U.S. 253 (1937), is a notable Supreme Court of the United States case. The issue was whether a local ("insular") law could be pre-empted by the Commerce clause of the United States Constitution. It was also notable as being one of the first cases that determined that Puerto Rico can be treated as if a state for some purposes under the law. It has become a precedent for similar cases.

=== Palko v. Connecticut ===
Palko v. Connecticut, 302 U.S. 319 (1937) involved a murder conviction. Palko had been charged with first-degree murder but was instead convicted of the lesser offense of second-degree murder and was given a sentence of life imprisonment. Prosecutors appealed per Connecticut law and won a new trial in which Palko was found guilty of first-degree murder and sentenced to death. Palko then appealed, arguing that the Fifth Amendment protection against double jeopardy applied to state governments through the Due Process Clause of the Fourteenth Amendment. The Court had previously held, in the Slaughterhouse cases, that the protections of the Bill of Rights should not be applied to the states under the Privileges or Immunities clause, but Palko argued that since the infringed right fell under a due process protection, Connecticut still acted in violation of the Fourteenth Amendment. On appeal, the Supreme Court held that the Due Process Clause protected only those rights that were "of the very essence of a scheme of ordered liberty" and that the court should therefore incorporate the Bill of Rights onto the states gradually, as justiciable violations arose, based on whether the infringed right met that test. Applying the subjective case-by-case approach (known as selective incorporation), the Court upheld Palko's conviction on the basis that the double jeopardy appeal was not "essential to a fundamental scheme of ordered liberty." In 1969 the Court overruled Palko by incorporating the protection against double jeopardy with its ruling in Benton v. Maryland.

=== Leitch Manufacturing Company v. Barber Company ===
In Leitch Manufacturing Company v. Barber Company, 302 U.S. 458 (1938), the Supreme Court extended the tie-in patent misuse doctrine to cases in which the patentee does not use an explicit tie-in license but instead relies on grants of implied licenses to only those who buy a necessary supply from it.

== Federal court system ==
Under the Judiciary Act of 1789 the federal court structure at the time comprised District Courts, which had general trial jurisdiction; Circuit Courts, which had mixed trial and appellate (from the US District Courts) jurisdiction; and the United States Supreme Court, which had appellate jurisdiction over the federal District and Circuit courts—and for certain issues over state courts. The Supreme Court also had limited original jurisdiction (i.e., in which cases could be filed directly with the Supreme Court without first having been heard by a lower federal or state court). There were one or more federal District Courts and/or Circuit Courts in each state, territory, or other geographical region.

The Judiciary Act of 1891 created the United States Courts of Appeals and reassigned the jurisdiction of most routine appeals from the district and circuit courts to these appellate courts. The Act created nine new courts that were originally known as the "United States Circuit Courts of Appeals." The new courts had jurisdiction over most appeals of lower court decisions. The Supreme Court could review either legal issues that a court of appeals certified or decisions of court of appeals by writ of certiorari. On January 1, 1912, the effective date of the Judicial Code of 1911, the old Circuit Courts were abolished, with their remaining trial court jurisdiction transferred to the U.S. District Courts.

== List of cases in volume 302 U.S. ==
Case name	Citation	Opinion of the Court	Vote	Concurring opinion or statement	Dissenting opinion or statement	Procedural jurisdiction	Result
Kelly v. Washington ex rel. Foss Company	302 U.S. 1 (1937)	Hughes	9-0	none	none	certiorari to the Washington Supreme Court (Wash.)	judgment reversed, and cause remanded
White v. Aronson	302 U.S. 16 (1937)	McReynolds	9-0	Stone and Cardozo (without opinions)	none	certiorari to the United States Court of Appeals for the First Circuit (1st Cir.)	judgment affirmed
Atlantic Refining Company v. Virginia	302 U.S. 22 (1937)	Brandeis	8-0[a]	none	none	appeal from the Virginia Supreme Court (Va.)	judgment affirmed
Bogardus v. Commissioner of Internal Revenue	302 U.S. 34 (1937)	Sutherland	5-4	none	Brandeis, Stone, Cardozo, and Black (joint opinion)	certiorari to the United States Court of Appeals for the Second Circuit (2d Cir.)	judgment reversed
United States v. Williams	302 U.S. 46 (1937)	Butler	9-0	none	none	certiorari to the United States Court of Appeals for the Seventh Circuit (7th Cir.)	judgment reversed, and cause remanded
Pennsylvania ex rel. Sullivan v. Ashe	302 U.S. 51 (1937)	Butler	9-0	none	none	certiorari to the Pennsylvania Supreme Court (Pa.)	judgment affirmed
McEachern v. Rose	302 U.S. 56 (1937)	Stone	9-0	none	none	certiorari to the United States Court of Appeals for the Fifth Circuit (5th Cir.)	decree reversed
Palmer v. Commissioner of Internal Revenue	302 U.S. 63 (1937)	Stone	9-0	none	none	certiorari to the United States Court of Appeals for the First Circuit (1st Cir.)	judgment reversed
Dodge v. Chicago Board of Education	302 U.S. 74 (1937)	Roberts	9-0	none	none	appeal from the Illinois Supreme Court (Ill.)	judgment affirmed
Groman v. Commissioner of Internal Revenue	302 U.S. 82 (1937)	Roberts	8-0[b]	none	none	certiorari to the United States Court of Appeals for the Seventh Circuit (7th Cir.)	judgment affirmed
Puget Sound Stevedoring Company v. State Tax Commission of Washington	302 U.S. 90 (1937)	Cardozo	9-0	none	none	appeal from the Washington Supreme Court (Wash.)	decree modified, and cause remanded
Hale v. Board of Assessment and Review of Iowa	302 U.S. 95 (1937)	Cardozo	6-3	none	Sutherland (opinion; joined by McReynolds and Butler)	appeal from the Iowa Supreme Court (Iowa)	judgment affirmed
Federal Trade Commission v. Standard Education Society	302 U.S. 112 (1937)	Black	9-0	none	none	certiorari to the United States Court of Appeals for the Second Circuit (2d Cir.)	decree reversed, and cause remanded
Chicago Title and Trust Company v. 4136 Wilcox Building Corporation	302 U.S. 120 (1937)	Sutherland	6-3	none	Cardozo (opinion; joined by Stone and Black)	certiorari to the United States Court of Appeals for the Seventh Circuit (7th Cir.)	decree reversed
James, State Tax Commissioner v. Dravo Contracting Company	302 U.S. 134 (1937)	Hughes	5-4	none	Roberts (opinion; joined by McReynolds, Sutherland, and Butler)	appeal from the United States District Court for the Southern District of West Virginia (S.D.W. Va.)	decree reversed, and cause remanded
Silas Mason Company v. Tax Commission of Washington	302 U.S. 186 (1937)	Hughes	5-4	none	Roberts (opinion at 302 U.S. 161 in James v. Dravo Contracting Company; joined by McReynolds, Sutherland, and Butler)	appeal from the Washington Supreme Court (Wash.)	judgments affirmed
Berman v. United States	302 U.S. 211 (1937)	Hughes	9-0	none	none	certiorari to the United States Court of Appeals for the Second Circuit (2d Cir.)	judgment reversed, and cause remanded
United States v. Kapp	302 U.S. 214 (1937)	Hughes	9-0	none	none	appeal from the United States District Court for the Western District of Oklahoma (W.D. Okla.)	judgment reversed, and cause remanded
Fleisher v. United States	302 U.S. 218 (1937)	per curiam	9-0	none	none	certiorari to the United States Court of Appeals for the Sixth Circuit (6th Cir.)	judgments reversed, and causes remanded
Forte v. United States	302 U.S. 220 (1937)	per curiam	9-0	none	none	certified questions from the United States Court of Appeals for the District of Columbia (D.C. Cir.)	certified questions answered
Fidelity and Deposit Company v. Pink, Superintendent of Insurance of New York	302 U.S. 224 (1937)	McReynolds	8-0[a]	none	none	certiorari to the United States Court of Appeals for the Second Circuit (2d Cir.)	judgment reversed, and cause remanded
Aluminum Company of America v. United States	302 U.S. 230 (1937)	McReynolds	7-0[a][c]	none	none	appeal from the United States District Court for the Western District of Pennsylvania (W.D. Pa.)	decree affirmed
Phillips-Jones Corporation v. Parmley	302 U.S. 233 (1937)	Brandeis	9-0	none	none	certiorari to the United States Court of Appeals for the Third Circuit (3d Cir.)	decree reversed
Helvering, Commissioner of Internal Revenue v. Gowran	302 U.S. 238 (1937)	Brandeis	9-0	none	none	certiorari to the United States Court of Appeals for the Seventh Circuit (7th Cir.)	decree reversed
Helvering, Commissioner of Internal Revenue v. Pfeiffer	302 U.S. 247 (1937)	Brandeis	7-2	none	Stone and Cardozo (joint opinion)	certiorari to the United States Court of Appeals for the Second Circuit (2d Cir.)	decree affirmed
Puerto Rico v. Shell Company (P.R.), Ltd.	302 U.S. 253 (1937)	Sutherland	9-0	none	none	certiorari to the United States Court of Appeals for the First Circuit (1st Cir.)	judgment reversed
Willing v. Binenstock	302 U.S. 272 (1937)	Sutherland	9-0	none	none	certiorari to the United States Court of Appeals for the Third Circuit (3d Cir.)	decree reversed, and cause remanded
Breedlove v. Suttles	302 U.S. 277 (1937)	Butler	9-0	none	none	appeal from the Georgia Supreme Court (Ga.)	judgment affirmed
Texas v. Donoghue	302 U.S. 284 (1937)	Butler	7-2	none	Cardozo (opinion; joined by Stone)	certiorari to the United States Court of Appeals for the Fifth Circuit (5th Cir.)	judgment reversed
Worcester County Trust Company v. Riley, Controller of California	302 U.S. 292 (1937)	Stone	9-0	none	none	certiorari to the United States Court of Appeals for the First Circuit (1st Cir.)	decree affirmed
Natural Gas Pipeline Company v. Slattery	302 U.S. 300 (1937)	Stone	9-0	none	none	appeal from the United States District Court for the Northern District of Illinois (N.D. Ill.)	judgment affirmed
Frad v. Kelly, U.S. Marshal	302 U.S. 312 (1937)	Roberts	9-0	none	none	certiorari to the United States Court of Appeals for the Second Circuit (2d Cir.)	judgment affirmed
Palko v. Connecticut	302 U.S. 319 (1937)	Cardozo	8-1	none	Butler (without opinion)	appeal from the Supreme Court of Errors of Connecticut (Conn.)	judgment affirmed
Smyth v. United States	302 U.S. 329 (1937)	Cardozo	6-3	Stone (opinion); Black (short statement)	McReynolds (opinion; joined by Sutherland and Butler)	certiorari to the United States Court of Claims (Ct. Cl.)	judgments affirmed (two cases); judgment reversed (one case)
McNair v. Knott, Treasurer of Florida	302 U.S. 369 (1937)	Black	9-0	McReynolds (opinion)	none	certiorari to the United States Court of Appeals for the Fifth Circuit (5th Cir.)	judgment affirmed
Honeyman v. Hanan	302 U.S. 375 (1937)	per curiam	9-0	none	none	appeal from the New York Supreme Court (N.Y. Sup. Ct.)	appeal dismissed
Nardone v. United States	302 U.S. 379 (1937)	Roberts	7-2	none	Sutherland (opinion; joined by McReynolds)	certiorari to the United States Court of Appeals for the Second Circuit (2d Cir.)	judgment reversed, and cause remanded
Railroad Commission of California v. Pacific Gas and Electric Company	302 U.S. 388 (1938)	Hughes	6-2[d]	Black (without opinion)	Butler (opinion; joined by McReynolds)	appeal from the United States District Court for the Northern District of California (N.D. Cal.)	decree reversed, and cause remanded
McCart v. Indianapolis Water Company	302 U.S. 419 (1938)	per curiam	7-1[e]	none	Black (opinion)	certiorari to the United States Court of Appeals for the Seventh Circuit (7th Cir.)	decree affirmed as modified
Standard Accident Insurance Company v. United States ex rel. Powell	302 U.S. 442 (1938)	McReynolds	9-0	none	none	certiorari to the United States Court of Appeals for the Fifth Circuit (5th Cir.)	judgment affirmed
United States ex rel. Willoughby v. Howard	302 U.S. 445 (1938)	Brandeis	9-0	none	none	certiorari to the United States Court of Appeals for the Seventh Circuit (7th Cir.)	judgment reversed, and cause remanded
Helvering, Commissioner of Internal Revenue v. Bashford	302 U.S. 454 (1938)	Brandeis	5-3[f]	none	McReynolds, Sutherland, and Butler (without opinions)	certiorari to the United States Court of Appeals for the Third Circuit (3d Cir.)	decree reversed
Leitch Manufacturing Company v. Barber Company	302 U.S. 458 (1938)	Brandeis	8-0[e]	none	none	certiorari to the United States Court of Appeals for the Third Circuit (3d Cir.)	decree reversed
Alabama Power Company v. Ickes, Federal Emergency Administrator of Public Works	302 U.S. 464 (1938)	Sutherland	9-0	Black (without opinion)	none	certiorari to the United States Court of Appeals for the District of Columbia (D.C. Cir.)	decrees affirmed
Duke Power Company v. Greenwood County	302 U.S. 485 (1938)	Sutherland	9-0	Black (without opinion)	none	certiorari to the United States Court of Appeals for the Fourth Circuit (4th Cir.)	decree affirmed
Textile Machine Works v. Louis Hirsch Textile Machines, Inc.	302 U.S. 490 (1938)	Stone	9-0	none	none	certiorari to the United States Court of Appeals for the Second Circuit (2d Cir.)	decree affirmed
Christopher v. Brusselback	302 U.S. 500 (1938)	Stone	7-0[e][g]	none	none	certiorari to the United States Court of Appeals for the Sixth Circuit (6th Cir.)	decree reversed
Schuylkill Trust Company v. Pennsylvania	302 U.S. 506 (1938)	Roberts	9-0	none	none	appeal from the Pennsylvania Supreme Court (Pa.)	judgment affirmed
United States v. Andrews	302 U.S. 517 (1938)	Roberts	9-0	none	none	certiorari to the United States Court of Claims Ct. Cl.)	judgment reversed
United States v. Garbutt Oil Company	302 U.S. 528 (1938)	Roberts	9-0	none	none	certiorari to the United States Court of Appeals for the Ninth Circuit (9th Cir.)	judgment reversed
United States v. McGowan	302 U.S. 535 (1938)	Black	8-0[e]	none	none	certiorari to the United States Court of Appeals for the Ninth Circuit (9th Cir.)	judgment reversed, and cause remanded
United States v. Raynor	302 U.S. 540 (1938)	Black	6-3	none	Sutherland (opinion; joined by McReynolds and Butler)	certiorari to the United States Court of Appeals for the Seventh Circuit (7th Cir.)	judgment reversed
Lanasa Fruit Steamship and Importing Company v. Universal Insurance Company	302 U.S. 556 (1938)	Hughes	7-2	none	McReynolds and Sutherland (without opinions)	certiorari to the United States Court of Appeals for the Fourth Circuit (4th Cir.)	judgment reversed, and cause remanded
Biddle v. Commissioner of Internal Revenue	302 U.S. 573 (1938)	Stone	6-3	none	McReynolds, Sutherland, and Butler (joint short statement)	certiorari to the United States Court of Appeals for the Second Circuit (2d Cir.)	judgment affirmed (one case); judgment reversed (one case)
Wright v. United States	302 U.S. 583 (1938)	Hughes	8-0[e]	Stone (opinion; with which Brandeis concurred)	none	certiorari to the United States Court of Claims (Ct. Cl.)	judgment affirmed
Minnesota Tea Company v. Helvering, Commissioner of Internal Revenue	302 U.S. 609 (1938)	Sutherland	8-0[e]	none	none	certiorari to the United States Court of Appeals for the Eighth Circuit (8th Cir.)	judgment affirmed
Ocean Beach Heights, Inc. v. Brown-Crummer Investment Company	302 U.S. 614 (1938)	Butler	9-0	none	none	certiorari to the United States Court of Appeals for the Fifth Circuit (5th Cir.)	decree reversed, and cause remanded
Creek Nation v. United States	302 U.S. 620 (1938)	Roberts	8-0[e]	none	none	certiorari to the United States Court of Claims (Ct. Cl.)	judgment reversed, and cause remanded
United States v. Stevens	302 U.S. 623 (1938)	Black	8-0[e]	none	none	certiorari to the United States Court of Appeals for the First Circuit (1st Cir.)	decree reversed
United States v. Jackson	302 U.S. 628 (1938)	Black	8-0[e]	none	none	certiorari to the United States Court of Appeals for the Fourth Circuit (4th Cir.)	judgment affirmed
Ex parte Levitt	302 U.S. 633 (1937)	per curiam	8-0[b](presumably, Black recused himself)	none	none	original jurisdiction	motion for leave to file a petition for an order requiring Justice Black to show cause, denied

[a] Hughes took no part in the case
[b] Black took no part in the case
[c] Stone took no part in the case
[d] Sutherland took no part in the case
[e] Cardozo took no part in the case
[f] Roberts took no part in the case
[g] Brandeis took no part in the case
