= Wright v. United States =

- Supreme Court of the United States

Argued November 1, 1937 Decided January 17, 1938
- Full case name: Wright v. United States
- Citations: 302 U.S. 583 (more)

Holding
- The recess of a single chamber under Article I, Section 5, is not an adjournment for the purposes of a pocket veto.

Court membership
- Chief Justice Charles E. Hughes Associate Justices James C. McReynolds · Louis Brandeis; Pierce Butler · Harlan F. Stone; Owen Roberts · Benjamin N. Cardozo; Hugo Black

Case opinions
- Majority: Hughes, joined by McReynolds, Butler, Roberts, Black
- Concur/dissent: Stone, joined by Brandeis
- Cardozo took no part in the consideration or decision of the case.

Laws applied
- Presentment Clause

Wright v. United States, 302 U.S. 583 (1938), was a United States Supreme Court case that clarified what qualifies as an adjournment for determining whether a veto is as a pocket veto and therefore unable to be overriden. The Court held that the recess of a single chamber under Article I, Section 5, is not an adjournment.

Unlike the Pocket Veto Case, Wright v. United States concerns situations where a single chamber of Congress has entered recess, as opposed to the adjournment of the full Congress.

== Background ==
In 1936, Congress passed a private bill which originated in the Senate. The President vetoed the bill and returned it on the final day permitted by the Constitution. The Senate was in recess, but the Secretary of the Senate received the bill and objections. The House was not in session, and no further action was taken.

The bill granted jurisdiction to the Court of Claims to rehear Wright's petition against the United States. Despite the bill having been vetoed, Wright presented his petition on September 14, 1936. The government opposed the petition on the grounds that the bill had not been passed, and the court denied it.

Wright appealed, and the Supreme Court granted review.

== Opinion of the court ==
The Court unanimously held that the bill had been properly vetoed and was therefore invalid. Writing for the majority, Chief Justice Charles Hughes based his decision on the idea that delivery of the bill and objections to an appropriate officer of the House of origin was sufficient for the purposes of deciding whether the bill had been vetoed. Furthermore, the majority interpreted 'adjournment' as requiring the recess of both Houses.

=== Dissenting Opinion ===
Justice Stone dissented in part, arguing that the recess of the Senate should have been considered an adjournment. He reasoned that a bill could not be returned to a House not in session, and that officers were not authorized to receive the President's objections.
