= Puerto Rico v. Shell Co. (P.R.) =

Puerto Rico v. Shell Co. (P. R.), Ltd.
- Supreme Court of the United States

Argued November 9, 1937 Decided December 6, 1937
- Full case name: People of Puerto Rico, petitioner, v. Shell Co. (P. R.), Ltd.
- Citations: 302 U.S. 253 (more) 58 S. Ct. 167; 82 L. Ed. 235

Case history
- Prior: 86 F.2d 577, reversed

Court membership
- Chief Justice Charles E. Hughes Associate Justices James C. McReynolds · Louis Brandeis; George Sutherland · Pierce Butler; Harlan F. Stone · Owen Roberts; Benjamin N. Cardozo · Hugo Black

Case opinion
- Majority: Sutherland, joined by unanimous

Laws applied
- Commerce Clause

Puerto Rico v. Shell Co. (P. R.), Ltd., 302 U.S. 253 (1937), is a Supreme Court of the United States case concerning Puerto Rico. The issue was whether a local ("insular") law could be pre-empted by the Commerce Clause of the United States Constitution. It was also notable as being one of the first cases that determined that Puerto Rico can be treated as if a state for some purposes under the law. It has become a precedent for similar cases.

== See also ==
- Competition law
- Dormant Commerce Clause
- List of United States Supreme Court cases, volume 302
- Bibb v. Navajo Freight Lines, Inc.
- Federal preemption
- United States energy law
