= Pocket veto =

Veto that takes effect without explicit action

A pocket veto is a legislative maneuver that allows a president or other official with veto power to exercise that power over a bill by taking no action ("keeping it in their pocket"), thus effectively killing the bill without affirmatively vetoing it. This depends on the laws of each country; the common alternative is that if the president takes no action a bill automatically becomes law.

== Barbados ==
Section 58 of the Constitution of Barbados, as amended by the Constitution Amendment Act 2021 (which transitioned the country from a Commonwealth realm to a parliamentary republic with its own head of state) states that the president shall declare his assent to a bill passed by Parliament or withhold his assent. However, the Barbadian Constitution does not give a specific time frame for presidential action on a bill sent by the Parliament. Thus, by indefinitely postponing action on a bill, and not sending it back to Parliament, the president could effectively veto it.

== Finland ==
The president of Finland has the power to pocket-veto bills passed by the parliament; however, such vetoes are temporary in effect.

== India ==
Article 111 of the Indian constitution states that the president shall declare his assent to a bill passed by both houses of Parliament or withhold his assent, provided that may he return the bill to Parliament for reconsideration. If the president returns the bill, and Parliament passes it once again, with or without any amendments, the president cannot withhold his assent. However, the Indian Constitution does not give a specific time frame for presidential action on a bill sent by the Parliament. Thus, by indefinitely postponing action on a bill, and not sending it back to Parliament, the president effectively vetoes it. Zail Singh, the president of India from 1982 until 1987, exercised a pocket veto to prevent the Indian Post Office (Amendment) Bill from becoming law.

== United States ==
Normally, if the president does not sign a bill, it becomes law after ten days (not including Sundays) as if the president had signed it. A pocket veto occurs when a bill fails to become law because the president does not sign it within the ten-day period and cannot return the bill to Congress because Congress is no longer in session. Article 1, Section 7 of the U.S. Constitution states:

If any Bill shall not be returned by the President within ten days (Sundays excepted) after it shall have been presented to him, the same shall be a Law, in like manner as if he had signed it, unless the Congress by their Adjournment prevent its return, in which case it shall not be a Law.

The Constitution limits the president's period for decision on whether to sign or return any legislation to ten days (not including Sundays) while the United States Congress is in session. A veto happens when the president sends the unsigned bill, along with his objections, back to the house of Congress from which it originated. Congress can override the veto by a two-thirds vote of both chambers, whereupon the bill becomes law. If Congress prevents the bill's return by adjourning during the 10-day period, and the president does not sign the bill, a "pocket veto" occurs and the bill does not become law. If a bill is pocket vetoed, the only way for Congress to circumvent the pocket veto is to reintroduce the legislation as a new bill, pass it through both chambers, and present it to the president again for signature. James Madison was the first president to use the pocket veto in 1812.

During his 12-year presidency, from 1933 to 1945, Franklin D. Roosevelt had 263 pocket vetoes, many more than any other president; the most after him was Dwight D. Eisenhower, who had 108. All presidents from Roosevelt to George W. Bush had pocket vetoes while they were in office. Since the George W. Bush presidency, no president has used the pocket veto.

=== Legal status ===
Courts have never fully clarified when an adjournment by Congress would "prevent" the president from returning a vetoed bill. Some presidents have interpreted the Constitution to restrict the pocket veto to the adjournment sine die of Congress at the end of the second session of the two-year congressional term, while others interpreted it to allow intersession and intrasession pocket vetoes. In 1929, the United States Supreme Court ruled in the Pocket Veto Case that a bill had to be returned to the chamber while it is in session and capable of work. While upholding President Calvin Coolidge's pocket veto, the court said that the "determinative question is not whether it is a final adjournment of Congress or an interim adjournment but whether it is one that 'prevents' the President from returning the bill". In 1938, the Supreme Court reversed itself in part in Wright v. United States, ruling that Congress could designate agents on its behalf to receive veto messages when it was not in session, saying that the Constitution "does not define what shall constitute a return of a bill or deny the use of appropriate agencies in effecting the return". A three-day recess of the Senate was considered a short enough time that the Senate could still act with "reasonable promptitude" on the veto. However, a five-month adjournment would be a long enough period to enable a pocket veto. Within those constraints, there still exists some ambiguity. Presidents have been reluctant to pursue disputed pocket vetoes to the Supreme Court for fear of an adverse ruling that would serve as a precedent in future cases.

=== George W. Bush ===
In December 2007, President George W. Bush claimed that he had pocket vetoed H.R. 1585, the National Defense Authorization Act for Fiscal Year 2008, even though the House of Representatives had designated agents to receive presidential messages before adjourning. The bill had been previously passed by veto-proof majorities in both the House and the Senate. If the president had chosen to veto the bill, he would have been required to return it to the chamber in which it originated, in this case the House of Representatives. The House then could have voted to override the veto, and the Senate could have done likewise. If each house had voted to override the veto, then the bill would have become law.

Then-House Speaker Nancy Pelosi stated: "Congress vigorously rejects any claim that the president has the authority to pocket veto this legislation and will treat any bill returned to the Congress as open to an override vote." On January 1, 2008, Deputy Assistant to the President and White House Deputy Press Secretary Scott Stanzel stated: "A pocket veto, as you know, is essentially putting it in your pocket and not taking any action whatsoever. And when Congress – the House is out of session – in this case it's our view that bill then would not become law."

Louis Fisher, a constitutional scholar at the Library of Congress indicated: "The administration would be on weak grounds in court because they would be insisting on what the Framers decidedly rejected: an absolute veto." By "absolute veto" Fisher was referring to the fact that a bill that has been pocket vetoed cannot have its veto overridden. Instead, the bill must be reintroduced into both houses of Congress, and again passed by both houses, an effort which can be very difficult to achieve.

In the end, the House of Representatives did not attempt to override the veto. Instead, in January 2008, the House effectively killed H.R. 1585 by referring the pocket veto message to the Armed Services Committee and passing H.R. 4986, a bill nearly identical to H.R. 1585 but slightly modified to meet the president's objection, which subsequently became law.

This was not the first time that a president has attempted to pocket veto a bill despite the presence of agents to receive his veto message. Both George H. W. Bush and Bill Clinton made similar attempts, and Abraham Lincoln used it against the Wade–Davis Bill in 1864.

=== State legislatures ===
Across the United States, pocket veto powers are not uncommon in committees of state legislatures, which allows a committee to "kill" a bill, sometimes without even a public vote; in Colorado, the power was notably repealed in a citizen initiative constitutional amendment in 1988 driven by various reform groups.

When a committee refuses to vote a bill out of committee, a discharge petition can be passed by the broader membership. The specifics vary from state to state; for example, in 2004, a report found that New York State places more restrictions than any other state legislature on motions to discharge a bill from a committee, which led to subsequent reforms.

=== Indiana ===
After nearly a century of pocket vetoes, the Indiana Supreme Court ruled pocket vetoes unconstitutional in 1969, which turned into law several bills that had been pocket vetoed, some of which were nearly a century old. Indiana Governor Edgar Whitcomb then requested that the Indiana General Assembly pass an act repealing all laws that were enacted because of the Supreme Court decision. The assembly complied with the request and passed a blanket repeal.

== Other use ==
Because a pocket veto cannot be overridden, it is sometimes used to describe situations where either one person, or a small group, can override the will of a much larger group without consequence. For example, when the California Supreme Court was answering the certified question of intervenor standing in the case of Perry v. Brown (known as the Proposition 8 case), one of the justices expressed concern that denying appellate standing to initiative proponents would mean that the governor and state attorney general would "essentially get a 'pocket veto'".

== See also ==
- List of United States presidential vetoes
- Recess appointment
