= Gridlock (politics) =

Political stalemate

In politics, gridlock or deadlock or political stalemate is a situation when there is difficulty passing laws that satisfy the needs of the people. A government is gridlocked when the ratio between bills passed and the agenda of the legislature decreases. Gridlock can occur when two legislative houses, or the executive branch and the legislature are controlled by different political parties, or otherwise cannot agree. Gridlock can occur when multiple veto players do not match the median voter.

The word "gridlock" is used here as a metaphor – referring to the traffic standstill which results when congestion causes the flow to freeze up completely.

== Proportional representation ==
In countries with proportional representation, the formation of coalition governments or consensus governments is common. The veto player theory predicts that multiparty governments are likely to be gridlocked, while other literature shows empirical absence of increased gridlock.

== Majoritarian representation ==
=== United States ===
U.S. Supreme Court Justice Antonin Scalia testified before the Senate Judiciary Committee about the gridlock caused by the separation of powers and checks and balances of the U.S. Government.

In United States politics, gridlock frequently refers to occasions when the House of Representatives and the Senate are controlled by different parties, or by a different party than the party of the president. Gridlock may also occur within the Senate, when no party has a three-fifths filibuster-proof majority of 60 seats.

Political Gridlock by author Ned Witting identifies many of the causes of gridlock in the United States and outlines ways to get government working again.

Law professors such as Sanford Levinson and Adrian Vermeule, as well as political commentators such as Matthew Yglesias and Debbie Parks, have criticized the U.S. Constitution and Senate voting rules for enabling situations of legislative gridlock. Along these lines, David Brady, a professor of political science at Stanford University, and Craig Volden, a professor of public policy and politics at the University of Virginia, explain gridlock by pointing to two interrelated factors: first, "the preferences of members of Congress regarding particular policies" and second, "supermajority institutions – the Senate filibuster and the presidential veto".

As a result, they argue, gridlock is not determined by party control of the government, but rather by an interplay between the existing policy and the spectrum of individual preferences held by congressional representatives. They maintain, in essence, that "the policy preferences of Members of Congress at or near the median are among the crucial determinants of policy outcomes."

Marcus Ethridge, an emeritus professor of political science at the University of Wisconsin–Milwaukee, argues in a 2011 policy analysis published by the libertarian Cato Institute that the U.S. Constitution was designed to foster gridlock in order to increase "the likelihood that policies will reflect broad, unorganized interests instead of the interests of narrow, organized groups." Ethridge presented an extended version of his analysis in The Case for Gridlock: Democracy, Organized Power, and the Legal Foundations of American Government (2010), which argues that "progressive reformers sought to shift the power to shape policy from the legislative branch to the executive bureaucracy" in an attempt to limit the power of special interests, but that this strategy backfired because of "the ability of interest groups to infiltrate the bureaucracy and promote their interests, often in ways diametrically opposed to the reformers' intentions" and "the capacity of Congress to overcome the influence of groups and generate policy change." In order to counter this, Ethridge suggests a "return to the 'constitutional principle' of gridlock, in which special interests must compete in a legislative forum".

Researchers such as David R. Jones argue that "higher party polarization increase[s] the likelihood of encountering gridlock". When looking at figures of polarization within U.S. politics, "partisan antipathy is deeper and more extensive – than at any point in the last two decades" with 92% of Republicans being to the right of the median Democrat, and 94% of Democrats aligning to the left of the median Republican voter. This modern polarization paired with a system designed to operate on Burkean representation, not today's party-line voting, leads to seemingly inevitable gridlock.

=== Parliamentary systems ===
In parliamentary democracies based on the Westminster system, political deadlock may occur when a closely-fought election returns a hung parliament, where no one party, or clear coalition of parties holds a majority. This may result in either the formation of a coalition government (if such an outcome is unusual, as in the United Kingdom, Canada and Australia, but not most of mainland Europe), a minority government, or a caretaker government with a mandate to oversee new elections.

In nations with bicameral parliaments, cases may arise where the government controls the lower house (which grants it confidence) but faces a hostile majority in the upper house. This may precipitate a constitutional crisis, particularly if the upper house is so determined in its opposition as to defeat the budget, and in a constitutional position to do so (as happened in 1910 in the United Kingdom and 1975 in Australia), insofar as a government unable to carry a budget cannot continue in office.

Solutions to this problem include a joint session of parliament (as in Australia), giving one house (usually the lower) the ultimate say on legislation (as in Ireland and Japan), stripping the upper house of some of its powers (as was done by the Parliament Act 1911 in the UK), or abolishing it entirely in favor of a unicameral parliament.

Where equal bicameralism is practiced, as in the Italian Parliament, constitutional practice may require the government maintain the confidence of both houses, making the defeat of crucial legislation such as the budget a vote of no confidence which forces the government to resign or call elections. Political deadlock may arise after elections when a party wins a majority in one chamber but fails to do so in another, as at the 2013 Italian general election, which resulted in the formation of a national unity government, or where a junior coalition partner withdraws its support, denying the government a majority in one house which it possesses in the other (the situation which brought down the second Conte government).

=== Semi-presidential systems ===
In semi-presidential republics, a directly elected president appoints a Prime Minister who must maintain the confidence of at least the lower house of the legislature. Insofar as a majority supporting, or at least not opposing the government is still necessary, gridlock can arise in much the same way as in parliamentary systems. Semi-presidential arrangements have an additional potential source of political friction - cohabitation. In this instance, the legislature and the President may be from opposition parties or coalitions. This may cause a variety of political outcomes depending on the constitutional arrangements and the degree of determination of both sides.

On one extreme is Taiwan, where the Premier is an administrator subordinate to the President. In this case, a vote of no confidence would have little practical effect since the President would simply appoint another ally. At the other end of the spectrum is Poland, where the Prime Minister is the effective chief executive. Should conflict arise, the Polish President will eventually be forced to bow to the will of parliament in appointing a cabinet, though they may still create obstructions in the process.

An intermediate case is France, where the degree of independence of the Prime Minister varies greatly depending on the circumstances. When the President and parliament are aligned, they are the President's chief deputy. In the case of cohabitation, the political centre of gravity tends to follow the Prime Minister, and not the President. The President may still substantially influence some policy areas directly, particularly foreign affairs, and can negotiate to force Parliament to accept more conciliatory members of the opposition as ministers.

== See also ==
- Budget crisis
- Cabinet crisis
- Constitutional crisis
- Divided government
- Government shutdown
- Hung parliament
- Obstructionism
- Parliamentary procedure
- Political efficacy
