= Veto =

Legal power to stop an official action

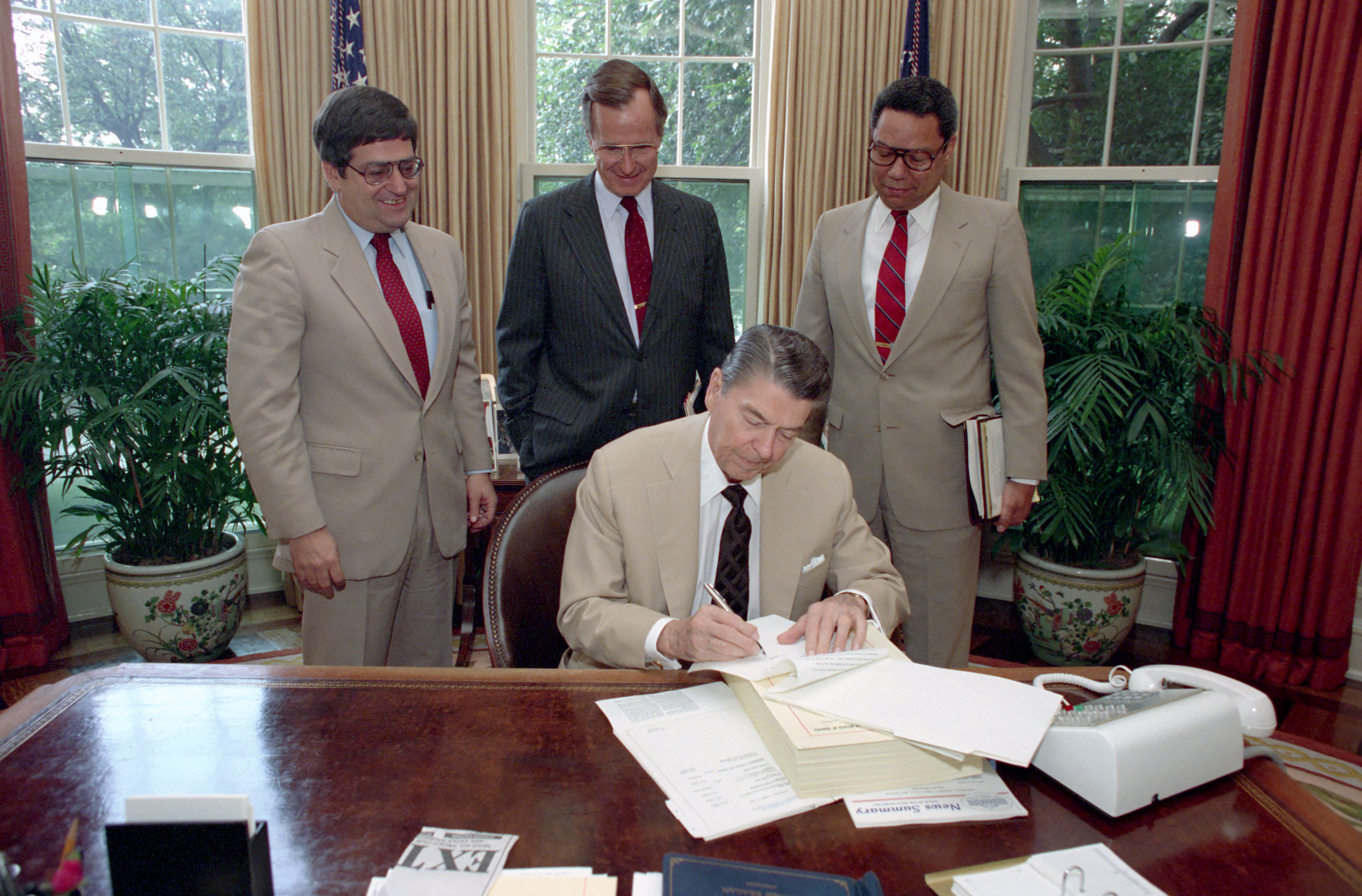
US President Ronald Reagan signing a veto of a bill

A veto is a legal power to unilaterally stop an official action. In the most typical case, a president or monarch vetoes a bill to stop it from becoming law. In many countries, veto powers are established in the country's constitution. Veto powers are also found at other levels of government, such as in state, provincial or local government, and in international bodies.

Some vetoes can be overcome, often by a supermajority vote: in the United States, a two-thirds vote of the House of Representatives and the Senate can override a presidential veto. Some vetoes, however, are absolute and cannot be overridden. For example, in the United Nations Security Council, the five permanent members (China, France, Russia, the United Kingdom, and the United States) have an absolute veto over any Security Council resolution.

In many cases, the veto power can only be used to prevent changes to the status quo. But some veto powers also include the ability to make or propose changes. For example, the Indian president can use an amendatory veto to propose amendments to vetoed bills.

The executive power to veto legislation is one of the main tools that the executive has in the legislative process, along with the proposal power. It is most commonly found in presidential and semi-presidential systems. In parliamentary systems, the head of state often has either a weak veto power or none at all. But while some political systems do not contain a formal veto power, all political systems contain veto players, people or groups who can use social and political power to prevent policy change.

The word "veto" comes from the Latin for "I forbid". The concept of a veto originated with the Roman offices of consul and tribune of the plebs. There were two consuls every year; either consul could block military or civil action by the other. The tribunes had the power to unilaterally block any action by a Roman magistrate or the decrees passed by the Roman Senate.

== History ==
=== Roman veto ===
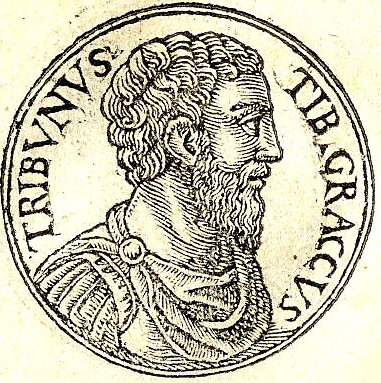
Tiberius Gracchus, Roman tribune

The institution of the veto, known to the Romans as the intercessio, was adopted by the Roman Republic in the 6th century BC to enable the tribunes to protect the mandamus interests of the plebeians (common citizenry) from the encroachments of the patricians, who dominated the Senate. A tribune's veto did not prevent the senate from passing a bill but meant that it was denied the force of law. The tribunes could also use the veto to prevent a bill from being brought before the plebeian assembly. The consuls also had the power of veto, as decision-making generally required the assent of both consuls. If they disagreed, either could invoke the intercessio to block the action of the other. The veto was an essential component of the Roman conception of power being wielded not only to manage state affairs but to moderate and restrict the power of the state's high officials and institutions.

A notable use of the Roman veto occurred in the Gracchan land reform, which was initially spearheaded by the tribune Tiberius Gracchus in 133 BC. When Gracchus' fellow tribune Marcus Octavius vetoed the reform, the Assembly voted to remove him on the theory that a tribune must represent the interests of the plebeians. Later, senators outraged by the reform murdered Gracchus and several supporters, setting off a period of internal political violence in Rome.

=== Liberum veto ===
In the constitution of the Polish–Lithuanian Commonwealth in the 17th and 18th centuries, all bills had to pass the Sejm or "Seimas" (parliament) by unanimous consent, and if any legislator invoked the liberum veto, this not only vetoed that bill but also all previous legislation passed during the session, and dissolved the legislative session itself. The concept originated in the idea of "Polish democracy" as any Pole of noble extraction was considered as good as any other, no matter how low or high his material condition might be. The more and more frequent use of this veto power paralyzed the power of the legislature and, combined with a string of weak figurehead kings, led ultimately to the partitioning and the dissolution of the Polish state in the late 18th century.

=== Emergence of modern vetoes ===
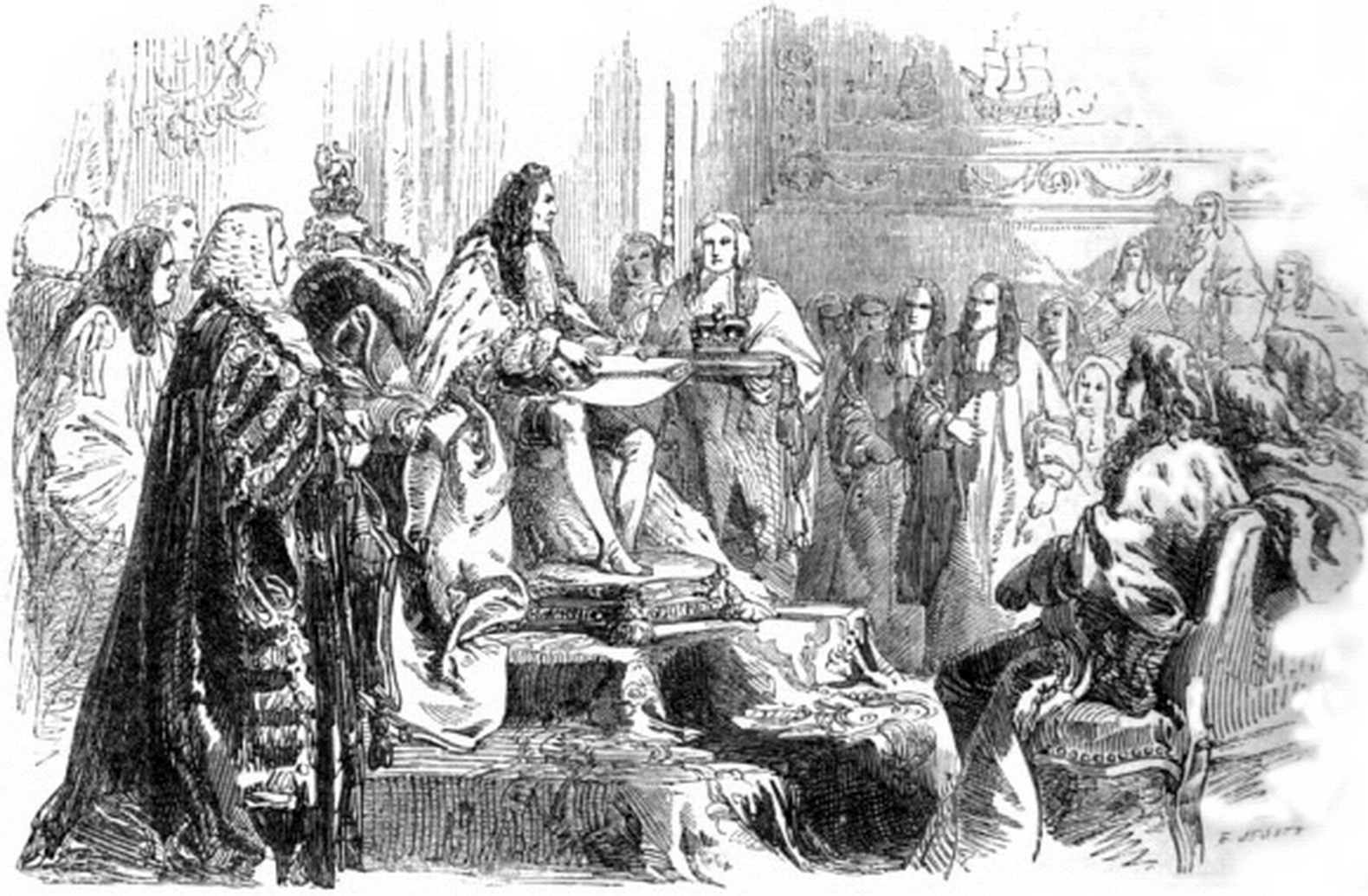
William III of England granting royal assent to the Toleration Act 1688

The modern executive veto derives from the European institution of royal assent, in which the monarch's consent was required for bills to become law. This in turn had evolved from earlier royal systems in which laws were simply issued by the monarch, as was the case for example in England until the reign of Edward III in the 14th century. In England itself, the power of the monarch to deny royal assent was not used after 1708, but it was used extensively in the British colonies. The heavy use of this power was mentioned in the U.S. Declaration of Independence in 1776.

Following the French Revolution in 1789, the royal veto was hotly debated, and hundreds of proposals were put forward for different versions of the royal veto, as either absolute, suspensive, or nonexistent. With the adoption of the French Constitution of 1791, King Louis XVI lost his absolute veto and acquired the power to issue a suspensive veto that could be overridden by a majority vote in two successive sessions of the Legislative Assembly, which would take four to six years. With the abolition of the monarchy in 1792, the question of the French royal veto became moot.

The presidential veto was conceived in by republicans in the 18th and 19th centuries as a counter-majoritarian tool, limiting the power of a legislative majority. Some republican thinkers such as Thomas Jefferson, however, argued for eliminating the veto power entirely as a relic of monarchy. To avoid giving the president too much power, most early presidential vetoes, such as the veto power in the United States, were qualified vetoes that the legislature could override. But this was not always the case: the Chilean constitution of 1833, for example, gave that country's president an absolute veto.

== Types ==
Most modern vetoes are intended as a check on the power of the government, or a branch of government, most commonly the legislative branch. Thus, in governments with a separation of powers, vetoes may be classified by the branch of government that enacts them: an executive veto, legislative veto, or judicial veto.

However, other types of veto power have safeguarded other interests. The denial of royal assent by governors in the British colonies, which continued well after the practice had ended in Britain itself, served as a check by one level of government against another. Vetoes may also be used to safeguard the interests of particular groups within a country. The veto power of the ancient Roman tribunes protected the interests of one social class (the plebeians) against another (the patricians). In the transition from apartheid, a "white veto" to protect the interests of white South Africans was proposed but not adopted. More recently, indigenous vetoes over industrial projects on indigenous land have been proposed following the 2007 Declaration on the Rights of Indigenous Peoples, which requires the "free, prior and informed consent" of indigenous communities to development or resource extraction projects on their land. However, many governments have been reluctant to allow such a veto.

Vetoes may be classified by whether the vetoed body can override them, and if so, how. An absolute veto cannot be overridden at all. A qualified veto can be overridden by a supermajority, such as two-thirds or three-fifths. A suspensory veto, also called a suspensive veto, can be overridden by a simple majority, and thus only delays the law from coming into force.

=== Types of executive vetoes ===
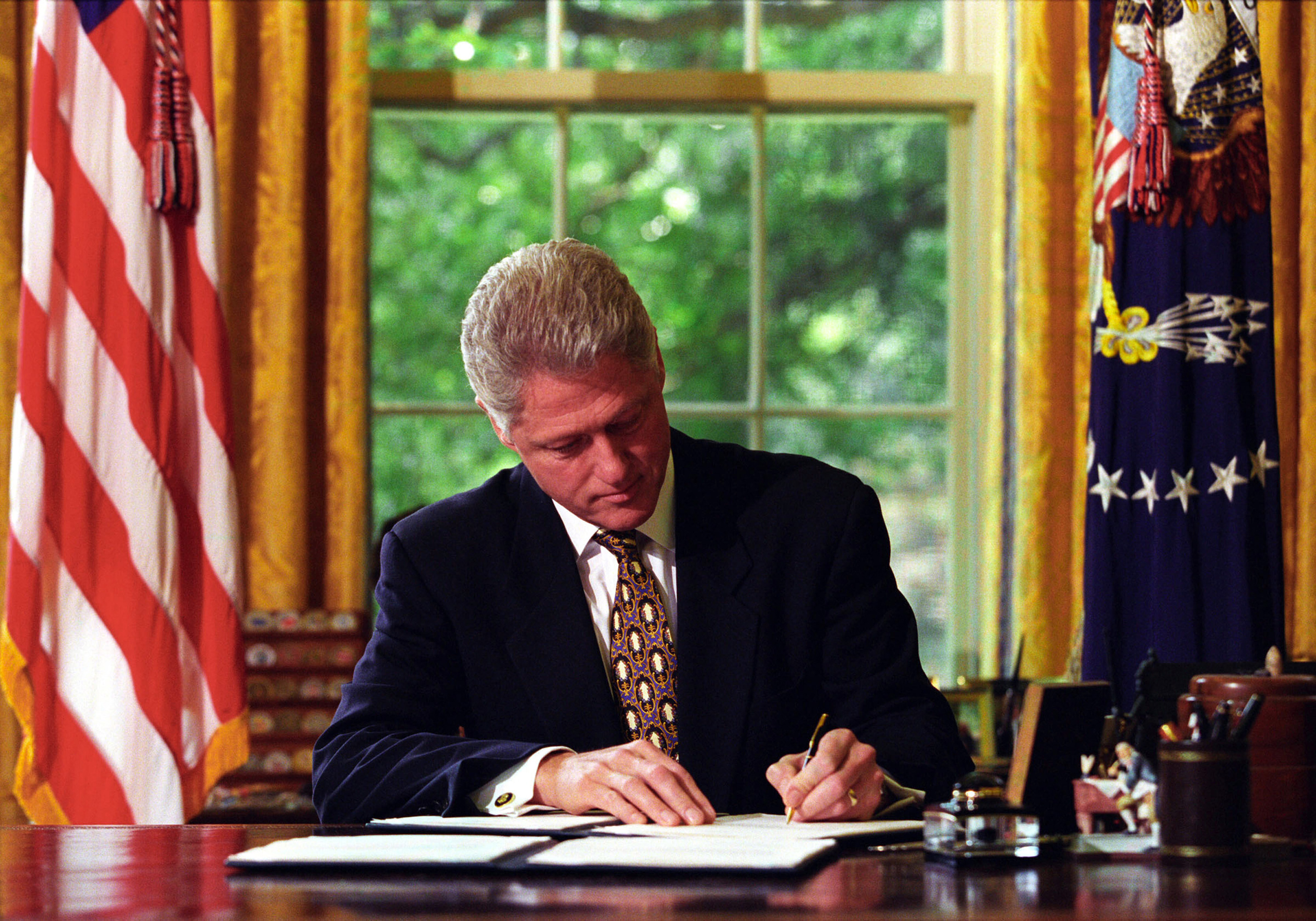
US President Bill Clinton signing cancellation letters related to his line-Item vetoes for the Balanced Budget Act of 1997

A package veto, also called a "block veto" or "full veto", vetoes a legislative act as a whole. Conversely, a partial veto, also called a line-item veto, allows the executive to object only to some specific part of the law while allowing the rest to stand. An executive with a partial veto has a stronger negotiating position than an executive with only a package veto power. An amendatory veto or amendatory observation returns legislation to the legislature with proposed amendments, which the legislature may either adopt or override. The effect of legislative inaction may vary: in some systems, if the legislature does nothing, the vetoed bill fails, while in others, the vetoed bill becomes law. Because the amendatory veto gives the executive a stronger role in the legislative process, it is often seen as a marker of a particularly strong veto power.

Some veto powers are limited to budgetary matters (as with line-item vetoes in some US states, or the financial veto in New Zealand). Other veto powers (such as in Finland) apply only to non-budgetary matters; some (such as in South Africa) apply only to constitutional matters. A veto power that is not limited in this way is known as a "policy veto".

One type of budgetary veto, the reduction veto, which is found in several US states, gives the executive the authority to reduce budgetary appropriations that the legislature has made. When an executive is given multiple different veto powers, the procedures for overriding them may differ. For example, in the US state of Illinois, if the legislature takes no action on a reduction veto, the reduction simply becomes law, while if the legislature takes no action on an amendatory veto, the bill dies.

A pocket veto is a veto that takes effect simply by the executive or head of state taking no action. In the United States, the pocket veto can only be exercised near the end of a legislative session; if the deadline for presidential action passes during the legislative session, the bill will simply become law. The legislature cannot override a pocket veto.

Some veto powers are limited in their subject matter. A constitutional veto only allows the executive to veto bills that are unconstitutional; in contrast, a "policy veto" can be used wherever the executive disagrees with the bill on policy grounds. Presidents with constitutional vetoes include those of Benin and South Africa.

=== Legislative veto ===
A legislative veto is a veto power exercised by a legislative body. It may be a veto exercised by the legislature against an action of the executive branch, as in the case of the legislative veto in the United States, which is found in 28 US states. It may also be a veto power exercised by one chamber of a bicameral legislature against another, such as was formerly held by members of the Senate of Fiji appointed by the Great Council of Chiefs.

=== Veto over candidates ===
In certain political systems, a particular body is able to exercise a veto over candidates for an elected office. This type of veto may also be referred to by the broader term "vetting".

Historically, certain European Catholic monarchs were able to veto candidates for the papacy, a power known as the jus exclusivae. This power was used for the last time in 1903 by Franz Joseph I of Austria.

In Iran, the Guardian Council has the power to approve or disapprove candidates, in addition to its veto power over legislation.

In China, following a pro-democracy landslide in the 2019 Hong Kong local elections, in 2021 the National People's Congress approved a law that gave the Candidate Eligibility Review Committee, appointed by the Chief Executive of Hong Kong, the power to veto candidates for the Hong Kong Legislative Council.

== Balance of powers ==
In presidential and semi-presidential systems, the veto is a legislative power of the presidency, because it involves the president in the process of making law. In contrast to proactive powers such as the ability to introduce legislation, the veto is a reactive power, because the president cannot veto a bill until the legislature has passed it.

Executive veto powers are often ranked as comparatively "strong" or "weak". A veto power may be considered stronger or weaker depending on its scope, the time limits for exercising it and requirements for the vetoed body to override it. In general, the greater the majority required for an override, the stronger the veto.

Partial vetoes are less vulnerable to override than package vetoes, and political scientists who have studied the matter have generally considered partial vetoes to give the executive greater power than package vetoes. However, empirical studies of the line-item veto in US state government have not found any consistent effect on the executive's ability to advance its agenda. Amendatory vetoes give greater power to the executive than deletional vetoes, because they give the executive the power to move policy closer to its own preferred state than would otherwise be possible. But even a suspensory package veto that can be overridden by a simple majority can be effective in stopping or modifying legislation. For example, in Estonia in 1993, president Lennart Meri was able to successfully obtain amendments to the proposed Law on Aliens after issuing a suspensory veto of the bill and proposing amendments based on expert opinions on European law.

== Worldwide ==
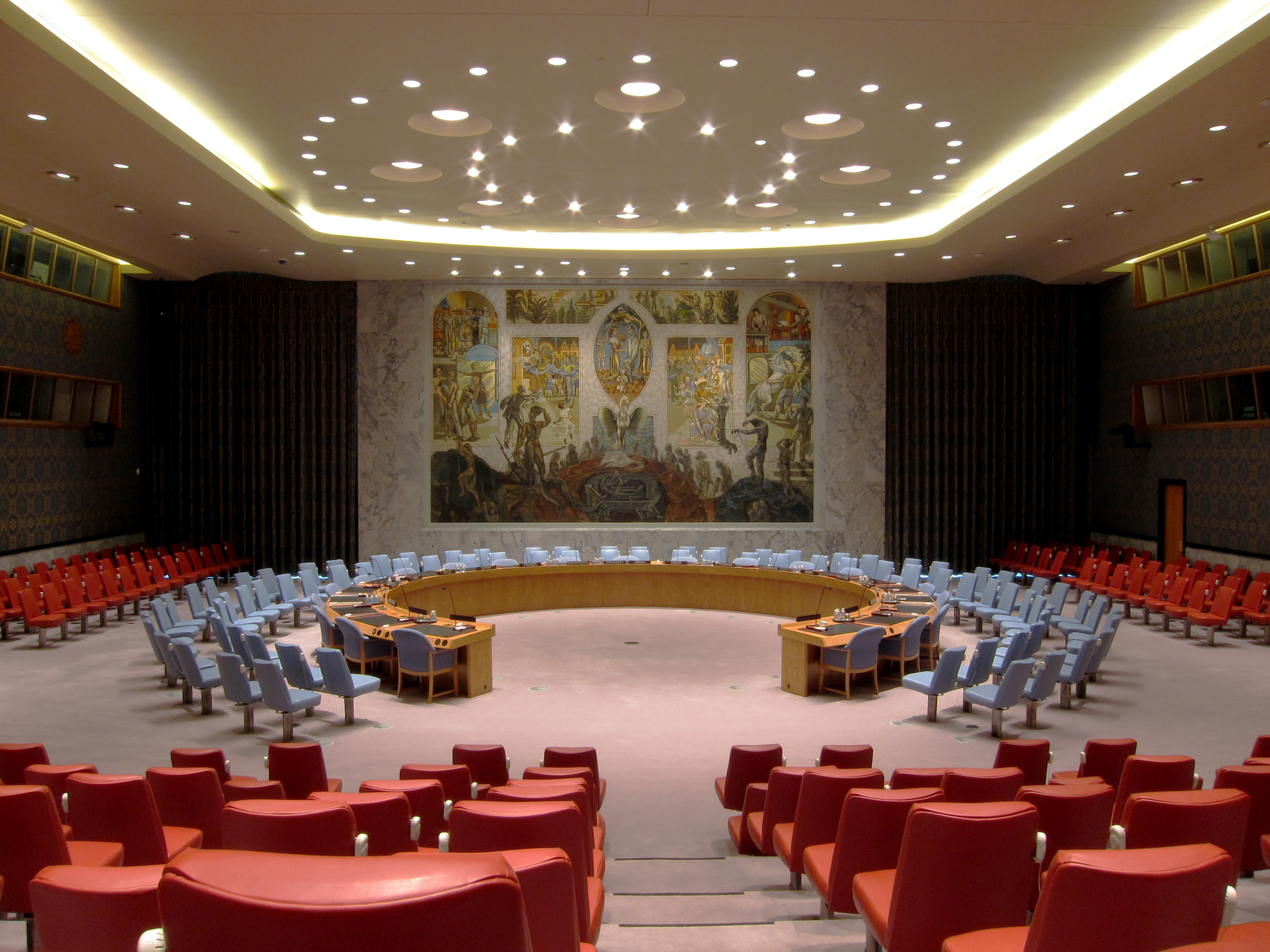
United Nations Security Council meeting room

Globally, the executive veto over legislation is characteristic of presidential and semi-presidential systems, with stronger veto powers generally being associated with stronger presidential powers overall. In parliamentary systems, the veto power of the head of state is typically weak or nonexistent. In particular, in Westminster systems and most constitutional monarchies, the power to veto legislation by withholding royal assent, while technically absolute, is a rarely used reserve power of the monarch. In practice, the Crown follows the convention of exercising its prerogative on the advice of parliament.

=== International bodies ===
- United Nations: The five permanent members of the United Nations Security Council have an absolute veto over Security Council resolutions, except for procedural matters. Every permanent member has used this power at some point. A permanent member that wants to disagree with a resolution, but not to veto it, can abstain. The first country to use the latter power was the USSR in 1946, after its amendments to a resolution regarding the withdrawal of British troops from Lebanon and Syria were rejected.
- European Union: The members of the EU Council have veto power in certain areas, such as foreign policy and the accession of a new member state, due to the requirement of unanimity in these areas. For example, Bulgaria has used this power to block accession talks for North Macedonia, and in the 1980s, the United Kingdom (then a member of the EU's precursor, the EEC) secured the UK rebate by threatening to use its veto power to stall legislation. In addition, when the Parliament and Council delegate legislative authority to the Commission, they can provide for a legislative veto over regulations that the Commission issues under that delegated authority. This power was first introduced in 2006 as "regulatory procedure with scrutiny", and since 2009 as "delegated acts" under the Lisbon Treaty. This legislative veto power has been used sparingly: from 2006 to 2016, the Parliament issued 14 vetoes and the Council issued 15.

=== Africa ===
Africa

- Benin: The president can return legislation to the National Assembly for reconsideration within 15 days (or 5 days if the legislation is declared urgent). The National Assembly can override the veto by passing the legislation once again by an absolute majority. If the president then vetoes the legislation a second time, the National Assembly can ask the Constitutional Court to rule on its constitutionality. If the Court rules that the legislation is constitutional, it becomes law. If the president neither approves nor returns legislation within the prescribed 15- or 5-day period, this operates as a veto, and the National Assembly can petition the Court to declare the law constitutional and effective. This occurred for example in 2008, when President Yayi did not take action on a bill that would set an end date to the "exceptional measures" by which he had kept the National Assembly in session. After pocket-vetoing the bill in this way, the president petitioned the Court for constitutional review. The Court ruled that once the deadline for presidential action had passed, only the National Assembly could petition for review, which it did (and prevailed).
- Cameroon: The president has the power to send bills back to the Parliament for a second reading. This power must be exercised within 15 days. On second reading the bill must be passed by an absolute majority to become law.
- Liberia: The president has package, line item and pocket veto powers under Article 35 of the 1986 Constitution. The President has twenty days to sign a bill into law, but may veto either the entire bill or parts of it, after which the Legislature must re-pass it with a two-thirds majority of both houses. If the President does not sign a bill within twenty days and the Legislature adjourns, the bill fails.
- South Africa: The president has a weak constitutional veto. The president can return a bill to the National Assembly if the president has reservations about the bill's constitutionality. If the National Assembly passes the bill a second time, the president must either sign it or refer it to the Constitutional Court of South Africa for a final decision on whether the bill is constitutional. If there are no constitutional concerns, the president's assent to legislation is mandatory.
- Uganda: The president has package veto and item veto powers. This power must be exercised within 30 days of receiving the legislation. The first time the president returns a bill to the Parliament, the Parliament can pass it again by a simple majority vote. If the president returns it a second time, the Parliament can override the veto with a two-thirds vote. This occurred for example in the passage of the Income Tax Amendment Act 2016, which exempted legislators' allowances from taxation.
- Zambia: Under the 1996 constitution, the president had an absolute pocket veto: if he neither assented to legislation nor returned it to parliament for a potential override, it was permanently dead. This unusual power was eliminated in a general reorganization of the Constitution's legislative provisions in 2016.

=== Americas ===
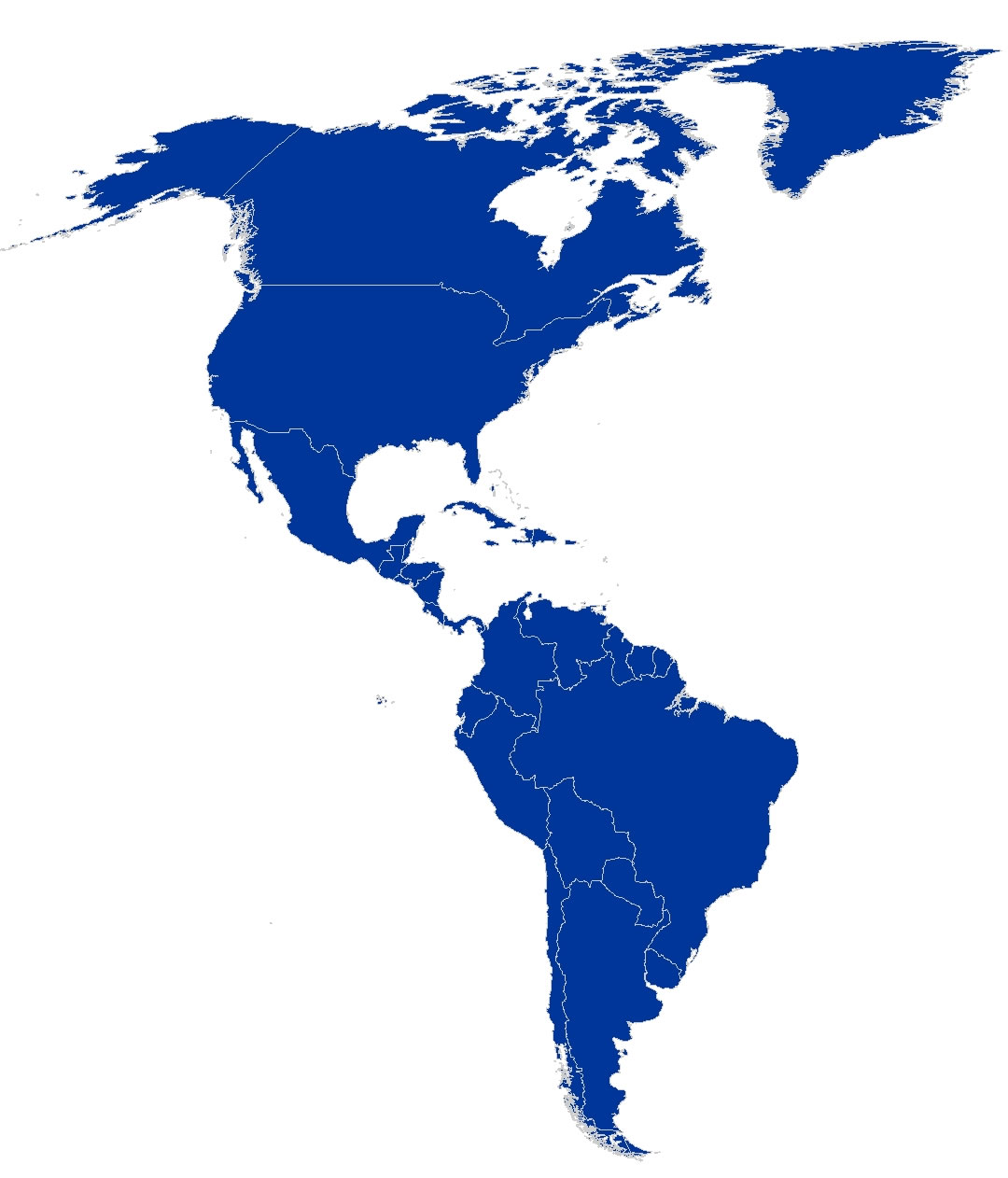
The Americas

- Brazil: The President of the Republic is entitled to veto, entirely or partially, any bill which passes both houses of the National Congress, exceptions made to constitutional amendments and congressional decrees. The partial veto can involve the entirety of paragraphs, articles or items, not being allowed to veto isolated words or sentences. National Congress has the right to override the presidential veto if the majority of members from each of both houses agree to, that is, 257 deputies and 41 senators. If these numbers are not met, the presidential veto stands.
- Canada: The King-in-Council (in practice the Cabinet of the United Kingdom) might instruct the governor general to withhold the king's assent, allowing the sovereign two years to disallow the bill, thereby vetoing it. Last used in 1873, the power was effectively nullified diplomatically and politically by the Balfour Declaration of 1926, and legally by the Statute of Westminster 1931. At the province level, lieutenant governors can reserve royal assent to provincial bills for consideration by the federal cabinet. This clause was last invoked in 1961 by the lieutenant governor of Saskatchewan. In addition, the Governor General in Council (federal cabinet) may disallow an enactment of a provincial legislature within one year of its passage.
- Dominican Republic: The president has only a package veto (observación a la ley), which must be exercised within 10 days after the legislation is passed. The veto must include a rationale. If both chambers of the Congress of the Dominican Republic vote to override the veto, the bill becomes law.
- Ecuador: The president has powers of package veto and amendatory veto (veto parcial). The president must issue a veto within 10 days after the bill is passed. The National Assembly can override an amendatory veto by a two-thirds majority of all members, but if it does not do so within 30 days of the veto, the legislation becomes law with the president's amendments. The National Assembly overrides approximately 20% of amendatory vetoes. The legislature must wait for a year before overriding a package veto.
- El Salvador: The president has both package veto and amendatory veto powers, which must be exercised within eight days of the legislation being passed by the Legislative Assembly. If the Legislative Assembly does not vote on an amendatory veto, the legislation fails. The Legislative Assembly can either accept or override an amendatory veto by a simple majority. Overriding a block veto requires a two-thirds supermajority.
- Mexico: The president has both package veto and amendatory veto powers, which must be exercised within ten days of the legislation being passed by the Congress of the Union. Congress may override either type of veto by a two-thirds majority of voting members in each chamber. However, in the case of an amendatory veto, Congress must first consider whether to accept the proposed amendments, which it may do by a simple majority of both chambers, in which point the amended bill will become law.
- United States: At the federal level, the president may veto bills passed by Congress, and Congress may override the veto by a two-thirds vote of each chamber. A line-item veto was briefly enacted in the 1990s, but was declared an unconstitutional violation of the separation of powers by the Supreme Court. At the state level, all 50 state governors have a full veto, similar to the presidential veto. Many state governors also have additional kinds of vetoes, such as amendatory, line-item, and reduction vetoes. Gubernatorial veto powers vary in strength. The president and some state governors have a "pocket veto", in that they can delay signing a bill until after the legislature has adjourned, which effectively kills the bill without a formal veto and without the possibility of an override.

=== Asia ===
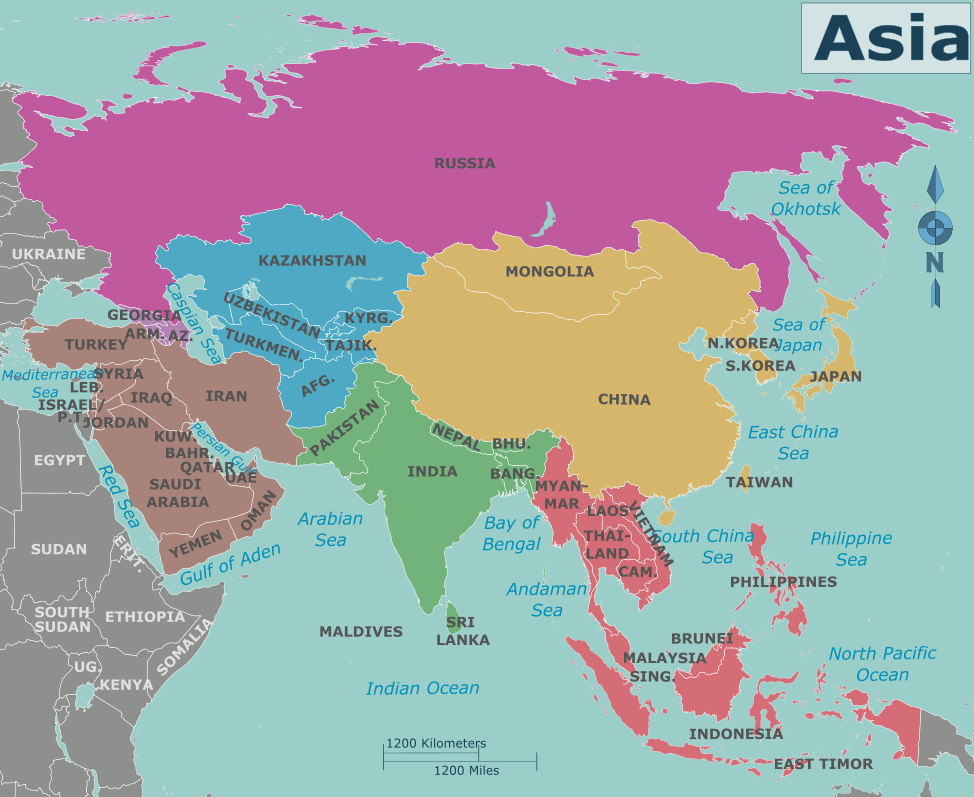
Asia

- China: Under the Constitution, the National People's Congress can nullify regulations enacted by the State Council. The State Council and president do not have a veto power.
- Georgia: The president can return a bill to the parliament with proposed amendments within two weeks of receiving the bill. Parliament must first vote on the proposed amendments, which can be adopted by the same majority as for the original legislation (for ordinary legislation, a simple majority vote). If Parliament does not adopt the amendments, it can override the veto by passing the original bill by an absolute majority. Before the constitutional reforms of the 2010s, the president had both a package veto and an amendatory veto, which could be overridden only with a 3/5 majority.
- India: The president has three veto powers: absolute, suspension, and pocket. The president can send the bill back to parliament for changes, which constitutes a limited veto that can be overridden by a simple majority. But the bill reconsidered by the parliament becomes a law with or without the president's assent after 14 days. The president can also take no action indefinitely on a bill, sometimes referred to as a pocket veto. The president can refuse to assent, which constitutes an absolute veto. But the absolute veto can be exercised by the President only once in respect of a bill. If the President refuses to provide his assent to a bill and sends it back to Parliament, suggesting his recommendations or amendments to the bill and the Parliament passes the bill again with or without such amendments, the president is obligated to assent to the bill.
- Indonesia: Express presidential veto powers were removed from the Constitution in the 2002 democratization reforms. The president can however enact a "regulation in lieu of law" (Peraturan Pemerintah Pengganti Undang-Undang or perppu), which temporarily blocks a law from taking effect. The People's Representative Council (DPR) can revoke such a regulation in its next session. In addition, the Constitution requires that legislation be jointly approved by the president and the DPR. The president thus can effectively block a bill by withholding approval. Whether these presidential powers constitute a "veto" has been disputed, including by former Constitutional Court justice Patrialis Akbar.
- Iran: The Guardian Council has the authority to veto bills passed by the Islamic Consultative Assembly. This veto power can be based on the legislation being contrary to the constitution or contrary to Islamic law. A constitutional veto requires a majority of the Guardian Council's members, while a veto based on Islamic law requires a majority of its fuqaha members. The Guardian Council also has veto power over candidates for various elected offices.
- Japan: There is no veto at the national level, as Japan has a parliamentary system and the constitution does not give the emperor authority to refuse to promulgate a law. Under the Local Autonomy Act of 1947, however, the executive of a prefectural or municipal government can veto local legislation. If the executive believes the legislation is unlawful, the executive is required to veto it. The local assembly can override this veto by a 2/3 vote.
- South Korea: The president can return a bill to the National Assembly for "reconsideration" (재의). Partial and amendatory vetoes are expressly forbidden. The National Assembly can override the veto by a 2/3 majority of the members present. Such overrides are rare: when the National Assembly overrode president Roh Moo-hyun's veto of a corruption investigation in 2003, it was the first override in 49 years.
- Philippines: The president may refuse to sign a bill, sending the bill back to the house where it originated along with his objections. Congress can override the veto via a 2/3 vote with both houses voting separately, after which the bill becomes law. The president may also exercise a line-item veto on money bills. The president does not have a pocket veto: once the bill has been received by the president, the chief executive has thirty days to veto the bill. Once the thirty-day period expires, the bill becomes law as if the president had signed it.
- Taiwan: With the President’s approval, the Executive Yuan may, within ten days of the bill being submitted to it, request that the Legislative Yuan reconsider the bill. The Legislative Yuan shall make a resolution within fifteen days of receiving the returned bill. If the Legislative Yuan fails to make a resolution within the aforementioned period, the original bill shall lapse. If more than half of all members of the Legislative Yuan support the original bill, the Premier of the Executive Yuan must immediately accept the bill.
- Uzbekistan: The president has a package veto and an amendatory veto. The Legislative Chamber of the Oliy Majlis can override either type of veto by a 2/3 vote. In the case of a package veto, if the veto is not overridden, the bill fails. In the case of an amendatory veto, if the veto is not overridden, the bill becomes law as amended. The Senate of the Oliy Majlis has a veto over legislation passed by the Legislative Chamber, which the Legislative Chamber can likewise override by a 2/3 vote.

=== Europe ===
Europe

European countries in which the executive or head of state does not have a veto power include Slovenia and Luxembourg, where the power to withhold royal assent was abolished in 2008. Countries that have some form of veto power include the following:

- Czech Republic: The president of the Czech Republic has a suspensory veto power over a law passed by the Parliament within 15 days with notes (president cannot veto laws changing constitution). Chamber of Deputies can override it by an absolute majority of all deputies. Also Chamber of Deputies can by same majority override if Senate rejects law previously approved by Chamber of Deputies. Same procedure applies for Senate amendments to the law approved by Chamber of Deputies.
- Estonia: The president may effectively veto a law adopted by the Riigikogu (legislature) by sending it back for reconsideration. The president must exercise this power within 14 days of receiving the law. The Riigikogu, in turn, may override this veto by passing the unamended law again by a simple majority. After such an override (but only then), the president may ask the Supreme Court to declare the law unconstitutional. If the Supreme Court rules that the law does not violate the Constitution, the president must promulgate the law. From 1992 to 2010, the president exercised the veto on 1.6% of bills (59 in all), and applied for constitutional review of 11 bills (0.4% in all).
- Finland: The president has a suspensive veto, but can only delay the enactment of legislation by three months. The president has had a veto power of some kind since Finnish independence in 1919, but this power was greatly curtailed by the constitutional reforms of 2000.
- France: The president has a suspensive veto: the president can require the National Assembly to reopen debate on a bill that it has passed, within 15 days of being presented with the bill. Aside from that, the president can only refer bills to the Constitutional Council, a power shared with the prime minister and the presidents of both houses of the National Assembly. Upon receiving such a referral, the Constitutional Council can strike down a bill before it has been promulgated as law, which has been interpreted as a form of constitutional veto.
- Germany: The federal president of Germany has to sign a bill in order for it to become law. This gives him a de facto veto power over legislation. However this power has been used only nine times since the founding of the federal Republic and is largely considered to be a ceremonial power.
- Hungary: The president has two options to veto a bill: submit it to the Constitutional Court if he or she suspects that it violates the constitution or send it back to the National Assembly and ask for a second debate and vote on the bill. If the court rules that the bill is constitutional, the president must sign it. Likewise, if the president has returned the bill to the National Assembly and it is passed a second time by a simple majority, it becomes law.
- Iceland: The president may refuse to sign a bill, which is then put to referendum. This right was not exercised until 2004, by President Ólafur Ragnar Grímsson, who also refused to sign two other bills related to the Icesave dispute. Two of these vetoes resulted in referendums.
- Ireland: The president may refer a bill to the Supreme Court to test its constitutionality, after consulting the Council of State. If it is judged constitutional the President must sign it into law. From 1990 to 2012, this power was used an average of once every three years. The president may also, on receipt of a petition signed by a majority of Seanad Éireann (the upper house of parliament) and a third of Dáil Éireann (the lower house of parliament), after consulting the Council of State, decline to sign a bill "of such national importance that the will of the people thereon ought to be ascertained" in an ordinary referendum or a new Dáil reassembling after a general election held within eighteen months. This latter power has never been used because the government of the day almost always commands a majority of the Seanad, preventing the third of the Dáil that usually makes up the opposition from combining with it.

The President of Ireland does not possess the power to veto a bill. Article 26 simply involves an exploration of a bill's constitutionality, while Article 27 simply adjusts the process of lawmaking to include a consultation with the people either in a referendum or general election. In both cases the final decision is made by someone else, the Supreme Court or the people. No one action by a president can kill a bill.

- Italy: The president may request a second deliberation of a bill passed by the Italian Parliament before it is promulgated. This is a very weak form of veto as the parliament can override the veto by an ordinary majority. While such a limited veto cannot thwart the will of a determined parliamentary majority, it may have a delaying effect and may cause the parliamentary majority to reconsider the matter. The president also has the power to veto appointments of ministers in the government of Italy, as for example president Sergio Mattarella did in vetoing the appointment of Paolo Savona as finance minister in 2018.
- Latvia: The president may suspend a bill for a period of two months, during which it may be referred to the people in a referendum if one-tenth of the electorate requests a referendum. The president may also return a document to the Saeima for reconsideration, but only once. Notably, in 1999, president Vaira Vike-Freiberga returned the Latvian State Language Law to the Saeima, even though the law had passed by an overwhelming majority the first time; the president used the suspensory veto to point out legal problems with the law, which resulted in amendments to bring it into line with European legal standards.
- Poland: The president may either submit a bill to the Constitutional Tribunal if they suspect that the bill is unconstitutional or send it back to the Sejm for reconsideration. These two options are exclusive: the president must choose one or the other. If president has referred a law to the Constitutional Tribunal and the tribunal says that the bill is constitutional, the president must sign it. If the president instead returns the bill to the Sejm in a standard package veto, the Sejm can override the bill by a three-fifths majority of members present (at least half of all members have to be present).
- Portugal: The president may refuse to sign a bill or refer it, or parts of it, to the Constitutional Court. If the bill is declared unconstitutional, the president is required to veto it, but the Assembly of the Republic can override this veto by a two-thirds majority. If the president vetoes a bill that has not been declared unconstitutional, the Assembly of the Republic may pass it a second time, in which case it becomes law. However, in Portugal presidential vetoes typically result in some change to the legislation. The president also has an absolute veto over decree-laws issued by the government of Portugal. In an autonomous region such as the Azores, the Representative of the Republic has the power to veto legislation, which the regional assembly can override by an absolute majority, and also holds the same constitutional veto power that the president has nationally.
- Spain: The Constitution states that "Within two months after receiving the text, the Senate may, by a message stating the reasons for it, adopt a veto or approve amendments thereto. The veto must be adopted by overall majority". A Senate veto can be overridden by an absolute majority vote of the Congress of Deputies. In addition, the government can block a bill before passage if it entails government spending or loss of revenue. This prerogative is commonly called veto presupuestario ("budget veto").
- Ukraine: The president may refuse to sign a bill and return it to the Verkhovna Rada with proposed amendments. The Verkhovna Rada may override a veto by a two-thirds majority. If the veto is not overridden, the President's amendments are subjected to an up-or-down vote; if they attract at least 50% support from the legislators, the bill is adopted with the amendments; if not, the bill fails.
- United Kingdom: Before the Parliament Act 1911, the House of Lords held an absolute veto over legislation passed by the House of Commons. Since then, the House of Lords has held only the power to delay laws passed by the House of Commons, with the sole exception of laws postponing an election of the House of Commons, where the House of Lords retains an absolute veto. The monarch has two methods of vetoing a bill. Any bill that has been passed by Parliament becomes law only when formally approved by the monarch (or their official representative), in a procedure known as royal assent. Legally, the monarch can withhold that consent, thereby vetoing the bill. This power was last exercised in 1708 by Queen Anne to block the Scottish Militia Bill 1708. The monarch has additional veto powers over bills which affect the royal prerogative, such as the war prerogative, or the monarch's personal affairs (such as royal incomes or hereditary property). By convention, those bills require king's consent before they may even be debated by Parliament, as well as royal assent if they are passed. King's consent is not obsolete and is occasionally withheld, though now only on the advice of the cabinet. An example was the Military Action Against Iraq (Parliamentary Approval) Bill in 1999, which received a first reading under the Ten Minute Rule, but was denied queen's consent for a second reading.
  - Scotland, Wales, and Northern Ireland: Powers exist under the section 35 of the Scotland Act 1998, section 114 of the Government of Wales Act 2006, and section 14 of the Northern Ireland Act 1998 that allow the responsible cabinet minister in Westminster to refuse a bill that has been passed by the Scottish Parliament, Senedd, or Northern Ireland Assembly, respectively, from proceeding to royal assent, if they believe that the bill modifies and has adverse effects on legislation that is reserved to the Parliament of the United Kingdom to solely legislate on. This power has only been used once, to veto the Gender Recognition Reform (Scotland) Bill in 2023.

=== Oceania ===
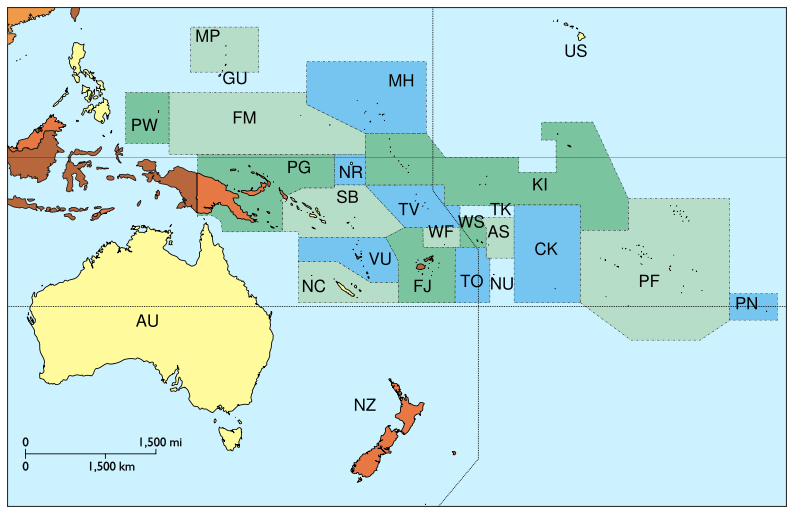
Oceania

- Australia: Section 58 of the constitution of Australia requires royal assent be provided by the governor-general of Australia for a bill passed by the Federal Parliament to become law. The governor-general has the power to refuse assent or reserve assent "for the Queen's pleasure", and section 59 also grants the monarch the power to disallow legislation within one year from the governor-general's assent. Neither of these provisions have been used and it has been suggested that their use would breach a constitutional convention. Similar provisions exist in state constitutions for the governors of the Australian states, but also regarded as spent. For the federal territories, section 122 of the constitution grants the federal parliament plenary power to veto legislation passed by the Australian Capital Territory Legislative Assembly and the Northern Territory Legislative Assembly, however the legislation constituting the current territory legislatures (and the subsequent Restoring Territory Rights Act 2022) have limited the circumstances in which this can occur.
- Federated States of Micronesia: The President can disapprove legislation passed by the Congress. The veto must be exercised within 10 days, or 30 days if the Congress is not in session. The Congress can override the veto by a three-fourths vote of the four state delegations, with each state delegation casting one vote.
- Fiji: Under the 2013 Constitution, the President has no authority to veto legislation that has been passed by the Parliament. Under the previous bicameral constitutions, the appointed Senate had veto powers over legislation passed by the elected lower house.
- New Zealand: Under the Standing Orders of the House of Representatives, the Government has a financial veto, under which it can block bills, amendments and motions that would have more than a minor impact on the Government's fiscal aggregates. Bills can be subjected to a financial veto only on third reading, when they have been finalized, but before they have been passed. The financial veto system was introduced in 1996.
- Tonga: The constitution empowers the King to withhold royal assent from bills adopted by the Legislative Assembly. In November 2011, the assembly adopted a bill that reduced the possible criminal sentences for the illicit possession of firearms, an offence for which two members of the assembly had recently been charged. Members of the opposition denounced the bill and asked the King to veto it, and he did so in December 2011.

== Veto theories ==
In political science, the broader power of people and groups to prevent change is sometimes analyzed through the frameworks of veto points and veto players. Veto players are actors who can potentially exercise some sort of veto over a change in government policy. Veto points are the institutional opportunities that give these actors the ability to veto. The theory of veto points was first developed by Ellen M. Immergut in 1990, in a comparative case study of healthcare reform in different political systems. Breaking with earlier scholarship, Immergut argued that "we have veto points within political systems and not veto groups within societies."

Veto player analysis draws on game theory. George Tsebelis first developed it in 1995 and set it forth in detail in 2002 Veto Players: How Political Institutions Work. A veto player is a political actor who has the ability to stop a change from the status quo. There are institutional veto players, whose consent is required by constitution or statute; for example, in US federal legislation, the veto players are the House, Senate and presidency. There are also partisan veto players, which are groups that can block policy change from inside an institutional veto player. In a coalition government the partisan veto players are typically the members of the governing coalition.

According to Tsebelis' veto player theorem, policy change becomes harder the more veto players there are, the greater the ideological distance between them, and the greater their internal coherence. For example, Italy and the United States have stable policies because they have many veto players, while Greece and the United Kingdom have unstable policies because they have few veto players.

While the veto player and veto point approaches complement one another, the veto players framework has become dominant in the study of policy change. Scholarship on rational choice theory has favored the veto player approach because the veto point framework does not address why political actors decide to use a veto point. In addition, because veto player analysis can apply to any political system, it provides a way of comparing very different political systems, such as presidential and parliamentary systems. Veto player analyses can also incorporate people and groups that have de facto power to prevent policy change, even if they do not have the legal power to do so.

Some literature distinguishes cooperative veto points (within institutions) and competitive veto points (between institutions), theorizing competitive veto points contribute to obstructionism. Some literature disagrees with the claim of veto player theory that multiparty governments are likely to be gridlocked.

== See also ==
- Royal assent
- Section 33 of the Canadian Charter of Rights and Freedoms, allowing a temporary legislative override of court decisions
- Veto voting
- Vetocracy

== Works cited ==
- Bulmer, Elliot (2017). Presidential Veto Powers (PDF) (2nd ed.). International Institute for Democracy and Electoral Assistance.
- Croissant, Aurel (2003). "Legislative powers, veto players, and the emergence of delegative democracy: A comparison of presidentialism in the Philippines and South Korea". Democratization. 10 (3): 68–98. doi:10.1080/13510340312331293937. S2CID 144739609.
- Köker, Philipp (2015). Veto et Peto: Patterns of Presidential Activism in Central and Eastern Europe (PDF) (PhD thesis). University College London.
- Oppermann, Kai; Brummer, Klaus (2017). "Veto Player Approaches in Foreign Policy Analysis". Oxford Research Encyclopedia of Politics. doi:10.1093/acrefore/9780190228637.013.386. ISBN 978-0-19-022863-7.
- Palanza, Valeria; Sin, Gisela (2020). "Chapter 21: Legislatures and executive vetoes". In Benoît, Cyril; Rozenberg, Olivier (eds.). Handbook of Parliamentary Studies. Edward Elgar Publishing. pp. 367–387. doi:10.4337/9781789906516.00030. ISBN 9781789906516. S2CID 229672005.
- Tsebelis, George (2002). Veto Players: How Political Institutions Work. Princeton University Press. ISBN 9781400831456.
- Tsebelis, George; Alemán, Eduardo (April 2005). "Presidential Conditional Agenda Setting in Latin America". World Politics. 57 (3). Cambridge University Press: 396–420. doi:10.1353/wp.2006.0005. JSTOR 40060107. S2CID 154191670.
- Tsebelis, George; Rizova, Tatiana P. (October 2007). "Presidential Conditional Agenda Setting in the Former Communist Countries". Comparative Political Studies. 40 (10): 1155–1182. doi:10.1177/0010414006288979. S2CID 154842077.
- Watson, Richard A. (1987). "Origins and Early Development of the Veto Power". Presidential Studies Quarterly. 17 (2): 401–412. JSTOR 40574459.

=== Constitutions cited ===
- Benin: "Constitution de la République du Bénin" (in French). 28 September 2020. Archived from the original on 2 July 2022.
  - "Constitution of the Republic of Benin" (PDF). Translated by Jessie L. Matthews. Oxford University Press. 1990.
- Cameroon: "LA CONSTITUTION de la République du Cameroun" (PDF) (in French).
  - "Cameroon 1972 (rev. 2008) Constitution". Comparative Constitutions Project. 2008.
- Canada: "THE CONSTITUTION ACTS, 1867 to 1982". Government of Canada. 10 June 2022.
- Dominican Republic: "República Dominicana 2015 Constitución" (in Spanish). Comparative Constitutions Project. 2015.
  - "Dominican Republic 2015 Constitution". Comparative Constitutions Project. 2015.
- Estonia: "The Constitution of the Republic of Estonia". Riigi Teataja. 22 July 2011.
- France: "Constitution of October 4, 1958". Assemblée Nationale. 23 July 2008.
- Georgia: "Georgia's Constitution of 1995 with Amendments through 2018" (PDF). Comparative Constitutions Project. 2018.
- Hungary: "Hungary 2011 (rev. 2016) Constitution". Comparative Constitutions Project. 2016.
- Indonesia: "The 1945 Constitution of the Republic of Indonesia" (PDF). Constitutional Court of the Republic of Indonesia. 2015.
- Iran: "Iran (Islamic Republic of)'s Constitution of 1979 with Amendments through 1989" (PDF). 1989.
- Japan: "日本国憲法" (in Japanese). The House of Representatives. 1946.
  - "The Constitution of Japan". Prime Minister of Japan and His Cabinet. 1946.
- Korea, South: "대한민국헌법" (in Korean). 25 February 1988.
  - "Constitution of the Republic of Korea". Statutes of the Republic of Korea. Korea Law Translation Center.
- Latvia: "THE CONSTITUTION OF THE REPUBLIC OF LATVIA". Latvijas Vēstnesis. 2018.
- Micronesia, Federated States of: "Micronesia (Federated States of) 1978 (rev. 1990) Constitution". Comparative Constitutions Project. 1990.
- Philippines: "The Constitution of the Republic of the Philippines". Official Gazette of the Republic of the Philippines. 2 February 1987.
- Poland: "THE CONSTITUTION OF THE REPUBLIC OF POLAND OF 2nd APRIL, 1997". 1997.
- Portugal: "CONSTITUTION OF THE PORTUGUESE REPUBLIC: SEVENTH REVISION [2005]" (PDF). 2005.
- South Africa: "Constitution of the Republic of South Africa, 1996". Government of South Africa. 2022.
- Spain: "La Constitución española de 1978" (in Spanish). Congreso de los deputados. 2003.
  - "Spain's Constitution of 1978 with Amendments through 2011" (PDF). Comparative Constitutions Project. 2011.
- Tonga: "Constitution of the Kingdom of Tonga" (PDF). Archived from the original (PDF) on 19 January 2012.
- Uganda: "Uganda 1995 (rev. 2017) Constitution". Comparative Constitutions Project. 2017.
- United States: "Constitution of the United States". U.S. Senate.
- Uzbekistan: "Constitution of the Republic of Uzbekistan". UZINFOCOM. 2014.
- Zambia: "Zambia 1991 (rev. 2016) Constitution". Comparative Constitutions Project. 2016.
