= Electoral threshold by country =

Electoral thresholds in different countries

The electoral threshold is the minimum share of votes that a candidate or political party requires before they become entitled to representation or additional seats in a legislature.

== Electoral thresholds in various countries ==
World map showing electoral threshold percentages of lower houses. Some countries may have more rules for coalitions and independents and for winning a specific number of district seats.: <1 / ≥1, <2 / ≥2, <3; ≥3, <4 / ≥4, <5 / ≥5, <6; ≥6, <7 / ≥7

In Poland's Sejm, Lithuania's Seimas, Germany's Bundestag, Kazakhstan's Mäjilis and New Zealand's House of Representatives, the threshold is five percent. In Poland, a higher threshold of 8% applies to electoral coalitions, while in Lithuania coalitions must cross a threshold of 7% of the vote. In Germany and New Zealand, parties that win at least one constituency seat are exempt from the threshold requirement.

Israel's Knesset uses a threshold of 3.25 percent. The threshold was previously 1% before the 1992 elections, 1.5% from 1992, 2% from 2006, and 3.25% from 2015. The Turkish parliament uses an electoral threshold of seven percent. In Poland, ethnic minority parties do not have to reach a threshold to get into the parliament, so there is often a small German minority representation in the Sejm.In Romania, a different threshold is used for ethnic minority parties than for national parties that run for the Chamber of Deputies.

=== Austria ===
Since 1992, the Austrian National Council has a threshold of four percent. It also applies to Austrian European elections.

=== Australia ===
The Australian Senate is elected using the single transferable vote (STV) and does not use an electoral threshold or have a predictable "natural" or "hidden" threshold. The quota ensures the election of candidates, but it is also possible to be elected with less than quota at the end of the count. At a normal election, each state returns six senators and the Australian Capital Territory and the Northern Territory each return two. For the states, the number is doubled in a double dissolution election. As such, the quota for election (as determined through the Droop quota) is 14.3 percent or 33.3 percent respectively. For the states, the quota for election is halved in a double dissolution election, when twice the members are elected. However, as STV allows votes to be transferred even across party lines, candidates who receive less than the quota for election in the first round of counting may reach the Droop quota and be certain of election, or at least have enough to be elected with less than the quota. Therefore, the sixth (or, at a double dissolution election, the 12th) Senate seat in each state is often won by a candidate of a party who received considerably less than the Droop quota in primary votes. For example, at the 2022 election, the sixth Senate seat in Victoria was won by the United Australia Party even though it won only four percent of the primary vote in that state. The successful UAP candidate, Ralph Babet, had personally accumulated a vote tally equivalent to 12 percent of the votes cast by the end, which due to seven percent being exhausted, meant he was the most popular when only he and one other candidate were still in the running.

=== Germany ===
Germany's mixed-member proportional system has a threshold of five percent of party-list votes for full proportional representation in the Bundestag in federal elections. However, this is not a stringent barrier to entry: any party or independent who wins a constituency is entitled to that seat whether or not they have passed the threshold. Parties representing registered ethnic minorities have no threshold and receive proportional representation should they gain the mathematical minimum number of votes nationally to do so. The 2021 election demonstrated the exception for ethnic minority parties: the South Schleswig Voters' Association entered the Bundestag with just 0.1 percent of the vote nationally as a registered party for Danish and Frisian minorities in Schleswig-Holstein. The 5% threshold also applies to all state elections; there is none for European Parliament elections.

German electoral law also includes the Grundmandatsklausel ('basic mandate clause'), which grants full proportional seating to parties winning at least three constituencies as if they had passed the electoral threshold, even if they did not. This rule is intended to benefit parties with regional appeal. This clause has come into effect in two elections: in 1994, when the Party of Democratic Socialism, which had significantly higher support in the former East Germany, won 4.4 percent of party-list votes and four constituencies, and in 2021, when its successor, Die Linke, won 4.9 percent and three constituencies. This clause was repealed by a 2023 law intended to reduce the size of the Bundestag. However, after complaints from Die Linke and the Christian Social Union, the Federal Constitutional Court ruled a threshold with no exceptions was unconstitutional. The court provisionally reintroduced the basic mandate clause for the 2025 federal election.

=== Norway ===
In Norway, the nationwide electoral threshold of four percent applies only to leveling seats. A party with sufficient local support may still win the regular district seats, even if the party fails to meet the threshold. For example, the 2021 election saw the Green Party and Christian Democratic Party each win three district seats, and Patient Focus winning one district seat despite missing the threshold.

=== Slovenia ===
In Slovenia, the threshold was set at 3 parliamentary seats during parliamentary elections in 1992 and 1996. This meant that the parties needed to win about 3.2 percent of the votes in order to pass the threshold. In 2000, the threshold was raised to 4 percent of the votes.

=== Sweden ===
In Sweden, there is a nationwide threshold of four percent for the Riksdag, but if a party reaches 12 percent in any electoral constituency, it will take part in the seat allocation for that constituency. As of the 2022 election, no one has been elected to the Riksdag based on the 12 percent rule.

=== United States ===
In the United States, as the majority of elections are conducted under the first-past-the-post system, legal electoral thresholds do not apply. It is possible to be elected with less than half the votes in a district. However, several states have threshold requirements for parties to obtain automatic ballot access to the next general election without having to submit voter-signed petitions. The threshold requirements have no practical bearing on the two main political parties (the Republican and Democratic parties) as they easily meet the requirements, but have come into play for the Green, Libertarian and other minor parties. The threshold rules also restrict independent candidates' access to the ballot.

== List of electoral thresholds by country ==
=== Africa ===
Country	Lower (or sole) house			Upper house	Other elections
Country	For individual parties	For other types	Other threshold	Upper house	Other elections
Benin	10%				
Burundi	2%				
Lesotho	None, natural threshold ~0.4%				
Mozambique	5%				
Namibia	None, natural threshold ~0.69%	6 seats appointed by president			
Rwanda	5%				
South Africa	None, natural threshold ~0.2%				

=== Asia and Oceania ===
Country	Lower (or sole) house			Upper house	Other elections
Country	For individual parties	For other types	Other threshold	Upper house	Other elections
Australia	Single-member districts for the House of Representatives			None, natural threshold ~8.4–34% for Senate elections (1 seat equivalent), depending on the number of seats up for election	
East Timor	4%				
Fiji	5%				
Indonesia	4%				
Israel	3.25%				
Kyrgyzstan	5% and 0.5% of the vote in each of the seven regions				
Nepal	3% vote each under the proportional representation category and at least one seat under the first-past-the-post voting				
New Zealand	5%		1 constituency seat		
Palestine	2%				
Philippines	2%	Other parties can still qualify if the 20% of the seats have not been filled up.			
South Korea	3%		5 constituency seats		10% (local council elections)
Taiwan	5%				
Tajikistan	5%				
Thailand	None, natural threshold ~0.1%				

=== Europe ===
Country	Lower (or sole) house			Upper house	Other elections
Country	For individual parties	For other types	Other threshold	Upper house	Other elections
Albania	3%	5% for multi-party alliances to each electoral area level			
Andorra	7.14% (1/14 of votes cast)				
Armenia	4%	8% for multi-party alliances (3 or fewer parties); 10% for multi-party alliances (4 or more parties)			
Austria	4%	0% for ethnic minorities			
Belgium	5% (at constituency level; no national threshold)				
Bosnia and Herzegovina	3% (at constituency level; no national threshold)				
Bulgaria	4%				
Croatia	5% (at constituency level; no national threshold)				
Cyprus	3.6%				1.8% in European Parliament elections
Czech Republic	5%	8% for bipartite alliances, 11% for multi-party alliances; does not apply for EU elections			
Denmark	2%		1 constituency seat		
Estonia	5%				
Finland	None, but high natural threshold due to multiple districts				
France	Not applicable				5% in European Parliament elections and in municipal elections for cities with at least 1000 habitants
Georgia	5%				3% for local elections in all municipalities but Tbilisi (2.5%)
Germany	5%	0% for ethnic minorities			0% in European Parliament elections
Greece	3%				
Hungary	5%	10% for bipartite alliances, 15% for multi-party alliances, 0.26% for ethnic minorities (for the first seat only)			
Ireland	Natural threshold 8–12% because 3 to 5 seats in each constituency				
Iceland	5% (only for compensatory seats)				
Italy	3%	10% (party alliances), but a list must reach at least 3%, 1% (parties of party alliances), 20% or two constituencies (ethnic minorities)		3%	4% in European Parliament elections
Kazakhstan	5%				
Kosovo	5%				
Latvia	5%				
Liechtenstein	8%				
Lithuania	5%	7% for party alliances			
Malta	natural threshold 12% due to district magnitude of 5				
Moldova	5%	3% (non-party), 12% (party alliances)			
Monaco	5%				
Montenegro	3%	Special rules apply for candidate lists representing national minority communities.			
Netherlands	0.67% (percent of votes needed for one seat; parties failing to reach this threshold have no right to a possible remainder seat)				3.23% for European Parliament elections (percent of votes needed for one seat; parties failing to reach this threshold have no right to a possible remainder seat)
Northern Cyprus	5%				
North Macedonia	None, but high natural threshold due to multiple districts				
Norway	4% (only for compensatory seats)				
Poland	5%	8% (alliances), does not apply for EU elections; 0% (ethnic minorities)		None; first-past-the-post voting	
Portugal	None, but high natural threshold due to multiple districts				
Romania	5%	10% (alliances)			
Russia	5%				
San Marino	5%				
Scotland	Natural threshold 5.6–6.3% at regional level because 15 to 17 seats in each electoral region				
Spain	3% (constituency). Ceuta and Melilla use first-past-the-post system.			None	5% for local elections. Variable in regional elections.
Sweden	4% (national level); 12% (constituency)				Municipalities: 2% or 3% Regions: 3% European parliament: 4%
Switzerland	None, but high natural threshold in some electoral districts				
Serbia	3%	0% for ethnic minorities			
Slovakia	5%	7% for bi- and tri-partite alliances, 10% for 4- or more-party alliances			
Slovenia	4%				
Turkey	7%	7% for multi-party alliances. Parties in an alliance not being subject to any nationwide threshold individually. No threshold for independent candidates.			
Ukraine	5%				
Wales	None, natural threshold ~14.3% at constituency level				

The electoral threshold for elections to the European Parliament varies for each member state, a threshold of up to 5 percent is applied for individual electoral districts, no threshold is applied across the whole legislative body.

=== North America ===
Country	Lower (or sole) house			Upper house	Other elections
Country	For individual parties	For other types	Other threshold	Upper house	Other elections
Costa Rica	None, but high natural threshold due to its use of some multiple-member districts with less than 10 seats				
Mexico	3%				

=== South America ===
Country	Lower (or sole) house			Upper house	Other elections
Country	For individual parties	For other types	Other threshold	Upper house	Other elections
Argentina	3% of registered voters				1.5% of valid votes for primaries
Bolivia	3%				
Brazil	No national electoral threshold, for parties threshold is 80% of the natural threshold in the district; for candidates 20% of the natural threshold in the district.	threshold for financial contributions is 2% at constituency level or 11 deputies in 9 states, increasing 2026 to 2.5% and 2030 to 3%			
Chile	None, but high natural threshold due to its use of multiple-member districts with less than 10 seats				
Colombia	3%				
Ecuador	None, but high natural threshold due to its use of multiple-member districts with less than 10 seats				
Paraguay	None, but high natural threshold due to its use of multiple-member districts with less than 10 seats				
Peru	5%				
Uruguay	1%			3%	

== Effects ==
An extreme example occurred in Turkey following the 2002 Turkish general election, where almost none of the 550 incumbent MPs were returned. This was a seismic shift that rocked Turkish politics to its foundations. None of the political parties that had passed the threshold in 1999, passed it again: DYP received only 9.55 percent of the popular vote, MHP received 8.34 percent, GP 7.25 percent, DEHAP 6.23 percent, ANAP 5.13 percent, SP 2.48 percent and DSP 1.22 percent. The aggregate number of wasted votes was an unprecented 46.33 percent (14,545,438). As a result, Erdoğan's AKP gained power, winning more than two-thirds of the seats in the Parliament with just 34.28 percent of the vote, with only one opposition party (CHP, which by itself failed to pass threshold in 1999) and 9 independents.

Other dramatic events can be produced by the loophole often added in mixed-member proportional representation (used throughout Germany since 1949, New Zealand since 1993): there the threshold rule for party lists includes an exception for parties that won 3 (Germany) or 1 (New Zealand) single-member districts. The party list vote helps calculate the desirable number of MPs for each party. Major parties can help minor ally parties overcome the hurdle, by letting them win one or a few districts:

- 2008 New Zealand general election: While New Zealand First received only 4.07 percent of the list vote (so it was not returned to parliament), ACT New Zealand won 3.65 percent of the list vote, but its leader won an electorate seat (Epsom), which entitled the party to list seats (4). In the 2011 election, leaders of the National Party and ACT had tea together before the press to promote the implicit alliance (see tea tape scandal). After their victories, the Nationals passed a confidence and supply agreement with ACT to form the Fifth National Government of New Zealand.
- In Germany, the post-communist PDS and its successor Die Linke often hovered around the 5 percent threshold: In 1994, it won only 4.4 percent of the party list vote, but won four districts in East Berlin, which saved it, earning 30 MPs in total. In 2002, it achieved only 4.0 percent of the party list vote, and won just two districts, this time excluding the party from proportional representation. This resulted in a narrow red-green majority and a second term for Gerhard Schröder, which would not have been possible had the PDS won a third constituency. In 2021, it won only 4.9 percent of the party list vote, but won the bare minimum of three districts (Berlin-Lichtenberg, Berlin-Treptow-Köpenick, and Leipzig II), salvaging the party, which received 39 MPs.

The failure of one party to reach the threshold not only deprives their candidates of office and their voters of representation; it also changes the power index in the assembly, which may have dramatic implications for coalition-building.

- Slovakia, 2002. The True Slovak National Party (PSNS) split from Slovak National Party (SNS), and Movement for Democracy (HZD) split from the previously dominant People's Party – Movement for a Democratic Slovakia. All of them failed to cross the 5 percent threshold with PSNS having 3.65 percent, SNS 3.33 percent and HZD 3.26 percent respectively, thus allowing a center-right coalition despite having less than 43 percent of the vote.
- Norway, 2009. The Liberal Party received 3.9 percent of the votes, below the 4 percent threshold for leveling seats, although still winning two seats. Hence, while right-wing opposition parties won more votes between them than the parties in the governing coalition, the narrow failure of the Liberal Party to cross the threshold kept the governing coalition in power. It crossed the threshold again at the following election with 5.2 percent.
- In the 2013 German federal election, the FDP, in Parliament since 1949, received only 4.8 percent of the list vote, and won no single district, excluding the party altogether. This, along with the failure of the right-wing eurosceptic party AfD (4.7%), gave a left-wing majority in Parliament despite a center-right majority of votes (CDU/CSU itself fell short of an absolute majority by just 5 seats). As a result, Merkel's CDU/CSU formed a grand coalition with the SPD.
- Poland, 2015. The United Left achieved 7.55 percent, which is below the 8 percent threshold for multi-party coalitions. Furthermore, KORWiN only reached 4.76 percent, narrowly missing the 5 percent threshold for individual parties. This allowed the victorious PiS to obtain a majority of seats with 37 percent of the vote. This was the first parliament without left-wing parties represented.
- Israel, April 2019. Among the three lists representing right-wing to far-right Zionism and supportive of Netanyahu, only one crossed the threshold the right-wing government had increased to 3.25 percent: the Union of the Right-Wing Parties with 3.70 percent, while future Prime Minister Bennett's New Right narrowly failed at 3.22 percent, and Zehut only 2.74 percent, destroying Netanyahu's chances of another majority, and leading to snap elections in September.
- Czech Republic, 2021. Přísaha (4.68%), ČSSD (4.65%) and KSČM (3.60%) all failed to cross the 5 percent threshold, thus allowing a coalition of Spolu and PaS. This was also the first time that neither ČSSD nor KSČM had representation in parliament since 1992.

=== Dramatic losses due to electoral threshold ===
- In the 1990 German federal election, the Western Greens did not meet the threshold, which was applied separately for former East and West Germany. The Greens could not take advantage of this, because the "Alliance 90" (which had absorbed the East German Greens) ran separately from "The Greens" in the West. Together, they would have narrowly passed the 5.0 percent threshold (West: 4.8%, East: 6.2%). The Western Greens returned to the Bundestag in 1994.
- Israel, 1992 legislative election. The extreme right-wing Tehiya (Revival) received 1.2 percent of the votes, which was below the threshold which it had itself voted to raise to 1.5 percent. It thus lost its three seats.
- In Bulgaria, the so-called "blue parties" or "urban right" which include SDS, DSB, Yes, Bulgaria!, DBG, ENP and Blue Unity frequently get just above or below the electoral threshold depending on formation of electoral alliances: In the EP election 2007, DSB (4.74%) and SDS (4.35%) were campaigning separately and both fell below the natural electoral of around 5 percent. In 2009 Bulgarian parliamentary election, DSB and SDS ran together as Blue Coalition gaining 6.76 percent. In 2013 Bulgarian parliamentary election, campaigning separately DGB received 3.25 percent, DSB 2.93 percent, SDS 1.37 percent and ENP 0.17 percent, thus all of them failed to cross the threshold this even led to a tie between the former opposition and the parties right of the centre. In the EP election 2014, SDS, DSB and DBG ran as Reformist Bloc gaining 6.45 percent and crossing the electoral threshold, while Blue Unity campaigned separately and did not cross the electoral threshold. In 2017 Bulgarian parliamentary election, SDS and DBG ran as Reformist Bloc gaining 3.06 percent, "Yes, Bulgaria!" received 2.88 percent, DSB 2.48 percent, thus all of them failed to cross the electoral threshold. In the EP election 2019, "Yes, Bulgaria!" and DBG ran together as Democratic Bulgaria and crossed the electoral threshold with 5.88 percent. In November 2021, electoral alliance Democratic Bulgaria crossed electoral threshold with 6.28 percent.
- Slovakia, 2010 parliamentary election. Both the Party of the Hungarian Community which (including their predecessors) hold seats in parliament since the Velvet Revolution and the People's Party – Movement for a Democratic Slovakia, which dominated in the 1990s, received 4.33 percent and thus failed to achieve the 5 percent threshold.
- Slovakia, 2016 parliamentary election. The Christian Democratic Movement achieved 4.94 percent missing only 0.06 percent votes to reach the threshold which meant the first absence of the party since the Velvet Revolution and the first democratic elections in 1990.
- Slovakia, 2020 parliamentary election. The coalition between Progressive Slovakia and SPOLU won 6.96 percent of votes, falling only 0.04 percent short of the 7 percent threshold for coalitions. This was an unexpected defeat since the coalition had won seats in the 2019 European election and won the 2019 presidential election less than a year earlier. In addition, two other parties won fewer votes but were able to win seats due to the lower threshold for single parties (5%). This was also the first election since the Velvet Revolution in which no party of the Hungarian minority crossed the 5 percent threshold.
- Lithuania, 2020 parliamentary election. The LLRA–KŠS won only 4.80 percent of the party list votes.
- Madrid, Spain, 2021 regional eleciton. Despite achieving 26 seats with 19.37 percent of the votes in the previous election, the liberal Ciudadanos party crashed down to just 3.54 percent in the 2021 snap election called by Isabel Díaz Ayuso, failing to get close to the 5 percent threshold.
- Slovenia, 2022 parliamentary election. Democratic Party of Pensioners of Slovenia only achieved 0.62 percent of the vote. This was the first time when DeSUS did not reached the 4 percent since 1996 which was part of almost every coalition since its foundation.
- Germany, 2022 Saarland state election. Alliance 90/The Greens fell 23 votes or 0.05 percent short of reaching representation. The Left fell from 12.8 percent to below the electoral threshold with 2.6 percent in their only western stronghold. Total percentage of votes not represented was 22.3 percent.
- Israel, 2022 Israeli legislative election. Meretz fell to 3.16 percent thus failed to cross the threshold for the first time.
- Germany, 2025 federal election. Both the Free Democratic Party (FDP), part of the previous government coalition, and the Sahra Wagenknecht Alliance (BSW), formed by a recent party split, fell just short of the threshold, with the FDP on 4.33% and BSW on 4.97%, just 0.03% short.
- Germany, 2026 Mecklenburg-Vorpommern state election. The CDU failed to meet the 5% threshold and was excluded from a regional parliament for the first time in party history.

=== Coalition changes ===
There has been cases of attempts to circumvent thresholds:

- Slovakia, 1998 parliamentary election. Slovak Democratic Coalition ran as a single political party to help its component parties get over the threshold.
- Turkey, 2007 and 2011 general elections. The DTP/BDP-led Thousand Hope Candidates and Labour, Democracy and Freedom Bloc only gained 3.81 percent (2007) and 5.67 percent (2011) of the vote not crossing the 10 percent threshold but because they ran as independents they won 22 and 36 seats.
- Poland, 2019 parliamentary election. After the United Left and KORWiN failed to cross the thresholds in 2015 both of them with their new alliances bypassed the coalition threshold by either running under SLD label (Lewica) or registering their alliance as a party itself (Confederation). Similarly to Lewica, the Polish Coalition ran under Polish People's Party label. Lewica and Polish Coalition would have crossed the coalition threshold of 8 percent with 12.56 percent and 8.55 percent respectively while Confederation only gained 6.81 percent of the vote.
- Czechia, 2021 parliamentary election. The Tricolour–Svobodní–Soukromníci alliance tried to bypass the coalition threshold by renaming Tricolour to include the names of their partners but they only received 2.76 percent, failing to cross the usual five percent threshold.

=== Wasted votes ===
Electoral thresholds can sometimes seriously affect the relationship between the percentages of the popular vote achieved by each party and the distribution of seats. The proportionality between seat share and popular vote can be measured by the Gallagher index while the number of wasted votes is a measure of the total number of voters not represented by any party sitting in the legislature. The failure of one party to reach the threshold not only deprives their candidates of office and their voters of representation; it also changes the power index in the assembly, which may have dramatic implications for coalition-building. The number of wasted votes changes from one election to another, here shown for New Zealand. The wasted vote changes depending on voter behavior and size of effective electoral threshold, for example in 2005 New Zealand general election every party above 1 percent received seats due to the electoral threshold in New Zealand of at least one seat in first-past-the-post voting, which caused a much lower wasted vote compared to the other years.

After the first implementation of the threshold in Poland in 1993, 34.4 percent of the popular vote did not gain representation. In the Russian parliamentary elections in 1995, with a threshold excluding parties under 5 percent, more than 45 percent of votes went to parties that failed to reach the threshold. In 1998, the Russian Constitutional Court found the threshold legal, taking into account limits in its use.

There had been a similar situation in Turkey, which had a 10 percent threshold, easily higher than in any other country. The justification for such a high threshold was to prevent multi-party coalitions and put a stop to the endless fragmentation of political parties seen in the 1960s and 1970s. However, coalitions ruled between 1991 and 2002, but mainstream parties continued to be fragmented and in the 2002 elections as many as 45 percent of votes were cast for parties which failed to reach the threshold and were thus unrepresented in the parliament. All parties which won seats in 1999 failed to cross the threshold, thus giving Justice and Development Party 66 percent of the seats.

In Bulgaria, 24 percent of voters cast their ballots for parties that would not gain representation in the elections of 1991 and of 2013. In the Ukrainian elections of March 2006, for which there was a threshold of 3 percent (of the overall vote, i.e. including invalid votes), 22 percent of voters were effectively disenfranchised, having voted for minor candidates. In the parliamentary election held under the same system, fewer voters supported minor parties and the total percentage of disenfranchised voters fell to about 12 percent. In the 2020 Slovak parliamentary election, 28.47 percent of all valid votes did not gain representation. In the 2021 Czech legislative election 19.76 percent of voters were not represented. In the 2022 Slovenian parliamentary election 24 percent of the vote went to parties which did not reach the 4 percent threshold including several former parliamentary parties (LMŠ, PoS, SAB, SNS and DeSUS).

Electoral thresholds can produce a spoiler effect, similar to that in the first-past-the-post voting system, in which minor parties unable to reach the threshold take votes away from other parties with similar ideologies. Fledgling parties in these systems often find themselves in a vicious circle: if a party is perceived as having no chance of meeting the threshold, it often cannot gain popular support; and if the party cannot gain popular support, it will continue to have little or no chance of meeting the threshold. As well as acting against extremist parties, it may also adversely affect moderate parties if the political climate becomes polarized between two major parties at opposite ends of the political spectrum. In such a scenario, moderate voters may abandon their preferred party in favour of a more popular party in the hope of keeping the even less desirable alternative out of power.

On occasion, electoral thresholds have resulted in a party winning an outright majority of seats without winning an outright majority of votes, the sort of outcome that a proportional voting system is supposed to prevent. For instance, the Turkish AKP won a majority of seats with less than 50 percent of votes in three consecutive elections (2002, 2007 and 2011). In the 2013 Bavarian state election, the Christian Social Union failed to obtain a majority of votes, but nevertheless won an outright majority of seats due to a record number of votes for parties which failed to reach the threshold, including the Free Democratic Party (the CSU's coalition partner in the previous state parliament). In Germany in 2013 15.7 percent voted for a party that did not meet the five percent threshold.

==== Mitigation ====
Elections that use the ranked voting system permit the continued participation in the election by those whose votes would otherwise be wasted. For example, the single transferable vote redistributes first preference votes for candidates below the threshold. Minor parties can indicate to their supporters before the vote how they would wish to see their votes transferred. The single transferable vote is a proportional voting system designed to achieve proportional representation through ranked voting in multi-seat (as opposed to single seat) organizations or constituencies (voting districts). Ranked voting systems are widely used in Australia and Ireland. Other methods of introducing ordinality into an electoral system can have similar effects. Ranking only the top two options with a spare vote reduces the complexity of vote counting while reducing wasted votes. A two-round system reduces wasted votes since the voters below the first-round threshold can vote in the second round for one of the remaining options.

== Legal challenges ==
The German Federal Constitutional Court rejected an electoral threshold for the European Parliament in 2011 and in 2014 based on the principle of one person, one vote. In the case of Turkey, in 2004 the Parliamentary Assembly of the Council of Europe declared the threshold of 10 percent to be manifestly excessive and asked Turkey to lower it. On 30 January 2007 the European Court of Human Rights ruled by five votes to two and on 8 July 2008, its Grand Chamber by 13 votes to four that the former 10 percent threshold imposed in Turkey does not violate the right to free elections (Article 3 of Protocol 1 of the ECHR). It held, however, that this same threshold could violate the Convention if imposed in a different country. It was justified in the case of Turkey in order to stabilize the volatile political situation over recent decades.
