= Electoral threshold =

Vote share required for representation

The electoral threshold, or election threshold, is the minimum share of votes that a candidate or political party requires before they become entitled to representation or additional seats in a legislature. This threshold is set in different ways in different situations. For example, in some party-list proportional representation systems, an electoral threshold requires that a party must receive a specified minimum percentage of votes (e.g. 5%), either nationally or in a particular electoral district, to obtain seats in the legislature. In single transferable voting, the quota acts as an electoral threshold to some degree, and it is possible to achieve it by receiving first-choice votes alone or by a combination of first-choice votes and votes transferred from other candidates based on lesser preferences. It is also a common occurrence in STV to see someone elected with less than the quota.

In some mixed-member proportional (MMP) systems, the election threshold determines which parties are eligible for top-up seats in the legislative chamber. Some MMP systems still allow a party to retain the seats they won in electoral districts even when they did not meet the threshold nationally. In some of these systems, top-up seats are allocated to a party that has not achieved the electoral threshold if it won at least one district seat or met some other minimum qualification.

Electoral thresholds can deny representation to small parties or force them into coalitions (joint slates). Such restraint is intended to make the elected government more stable by reducing party fragmentation and by keeping out fringe parties. Proponents of a high electoral threshold say that having seats in a legislature boosts the profile of a less popular party that does not deserve it, and that providing representation and possibly veto power to a party that receives only 1 percent of the vote is not appropriate. However, others argue that in the absence of a ranked ballot or proportional voting system at the district level, supporters of minor parties, barred from top-up seats, are effectively disenfranchised and denied the right to be represented by someone of their choosing.

Two boundaries can be defined. A threshold of representation (or threshold of inclusion) is the minimum vote share that might yield a party a seat under the most favourable circumstances for the party. The threshold of exclusion is the maximum vote share that could be insufficient to yield a seat under the least favourable circumstances. A third amount, the informal threshold, was calculated by Arend Lijphart as the mean of the two boundaries. Michael Gallagher gave this value the name effective threshold and set it at an amount of first preference votes equal to 75 percent of the Droop quota. However, he warned that this was to be used at the district level and not to assume that a party with a certain share of the overall vote was sure to have representation.

The electoral threshold is a barrier to entry for political parties to the political competition. Sometimes an electoral threshold is imposed district by district. Where the district magnitude (DM), the number of seats in a district, is high enough to allow less-popular parties to have representation and this is not desired, a district electoral threshold may be imposed just in those high-DM districts. In addition to the legislated electoral threshold, a natural threshold arises in fair voting systems from the district magnitude. The more seats, the smaller the percentage of district votes required to be elected.

== Natural threshold ==
Deputies by constituency assigned for the Spanish general elections of 2019

The number of seats in each electoral district creates a "hidden" natural threshold (also called an effective threshold or informal threshold). Some barrier to entry is seen in any system, due to the effective threshold produced by district magnitude (DM), the number of seats in the district, and due to the effect of wasted votes caused by the election system being used. In very proportional election systems, each member is elected by about the same number of votes (approximately equivalent to the Hare quota if there are very few wasted votes), and anything less than that number is insufficient to receive representation. In systems where DM varies from district to district, a district with exceptionally high district magnitude, such as may be used in the largest city, may allow representation to small parties that do not have a chance for any representation at all in other districts where DM is low. Conversely, where many districts are used (and thus average DM is low), the effective threshold for a party to potentially take at least one seat is also low.

The number of votes that guarantees that a party will win a seat can be calculated by the formula ($\frac{\mbox{total number of votes}}{\mbox{number of seats}+1} + \varepsilon$) where ε is the smallest possible number of votes, in situations where party votes are pooled or are able to be concentrate behind one candidate. That means that in a district with four seats, slightly more than 20 percent of the votes will guarantee a seat. Under more favourable circumstances, a party with fewer votes may win a seat. The most important factor in determining the natural threshold is the number of seats to be filled by the district. Other factors are the seat allocation formula (Saint-Laguë, D'Hondt or Hare), the number of contestant political parties and the size of the assembly. Generally, smaller districts leads to a higher proportion of votes needed to win a seat and vice versa. The lower bound (the threshold of representation or the percentage of the vote that allows a party to earn a seat under the most favourable circumstances) is more difficult to calculate. In addition to the factors mentioned earlier, the number of votes cast for smaller parties are important. If more votes are cast for parties that do not win any seat, that will mean a lower percentage of votes needed to win a seat.

In some elections, the natural threshold may be higher than the electoral threshold. In Spain, the electoral threshold for districts with more than 24 seats is 3 percent of valid votes—which includes blank ballots—in the district. Another example of this effect are elections to the European Parliament. In the Cyprus EU constituency, the legal threshold is 1.8 percent, explicitly replacing the threshold for national election which is 3.6 percent. Cyprus only has 6 MEPs, raising the natural threshold. An extreme example of this was in the 2004 EU Parliament elections, where For Europe won 36,112 votes (10.80%) and EDEK won 36,075 votes (10.79%); despite both parties crossing the threshold by a high margin and a difference of only 37 votes, only "For Europe" returned an MEP to the European Parliament. Other examples include:

- Lithuania EU constituency (2004): LLRA–KŠS–LRS won 5.37 percent despite a threshold of 5 percent
- Austria EU constituency (2009): BZÖ won 4.6 percent despite a threshold of 4 percent; after the Treaty of Lisbon, Ewald Stadler (BZÖ) became MEP
- Croatia EU constituency (2014): Alliance for Croatia won 6.88 percent despite a threshold of 5 percent
- Latvia EU constituency (2019): ZZS won 5.34 percent despite a threshold of 5 percent
- Croatia EU constituency (2024): "Fair Play List 9" won 5.54 percent despite a threshold of five percent; in 2019, its predecessor, Amsterdam Coalition, won a MEP with just 5.19 percent
- Lithuania EU constituency (2024): LRP won 5.15 percent despite a threshold of 5 percent

In Moldova, each independent politician needs 2% to be elected despite the fact that there are 101 seats in total (so worth 2.02 seats).

== Recommendations for electoral thresholds ==
The Parliamentary Assembly of the Council of Europe recommends for parliamentary elections a threshold not higher than three percent. For single transferable voting, to produce representation for parties with approximately ten percent or more of the votes, John M. Carey and Simon Hix recommended a district magnitude (DM) of approximately six or more.

Support for a party is not homogeneous across an electorate, so a party with ten percent of the vote is expected to easily achieve the electoral threshold in at least one district even if not in others. Most STV systems used today use the Droop quota, which in a six-member district is 14 percent of the votes cast in the district. Carey and Hix note that increasing the DM from one to six produces an improvement in proportionality that is much larger than any subsequent increase in DM, pointing out that the most popular parties take the largest share of votes and the largest share of seats in any PR system, leaving few to small parties under any system.

Transfers of votes from other parties to a party and willingness of the party's voters to mark alternate preferences (and thus prevent their vote from being exhausted) also play a role in the amount of representation that each party takes, and is somewhat independent of the party's vote share in the first count. Due to the effect of districting, a party is not assured of taking its proportional share of seats, but with the use of districts with a DM of 6, a party with more than ten percent of the vote will elect some representation, according to Carey and Hix.

== See also ==
- Electoral threshold by country
- List of democracy and elections-related topics
- Vote splitting
