= Filibuster =

Political stalling tactic

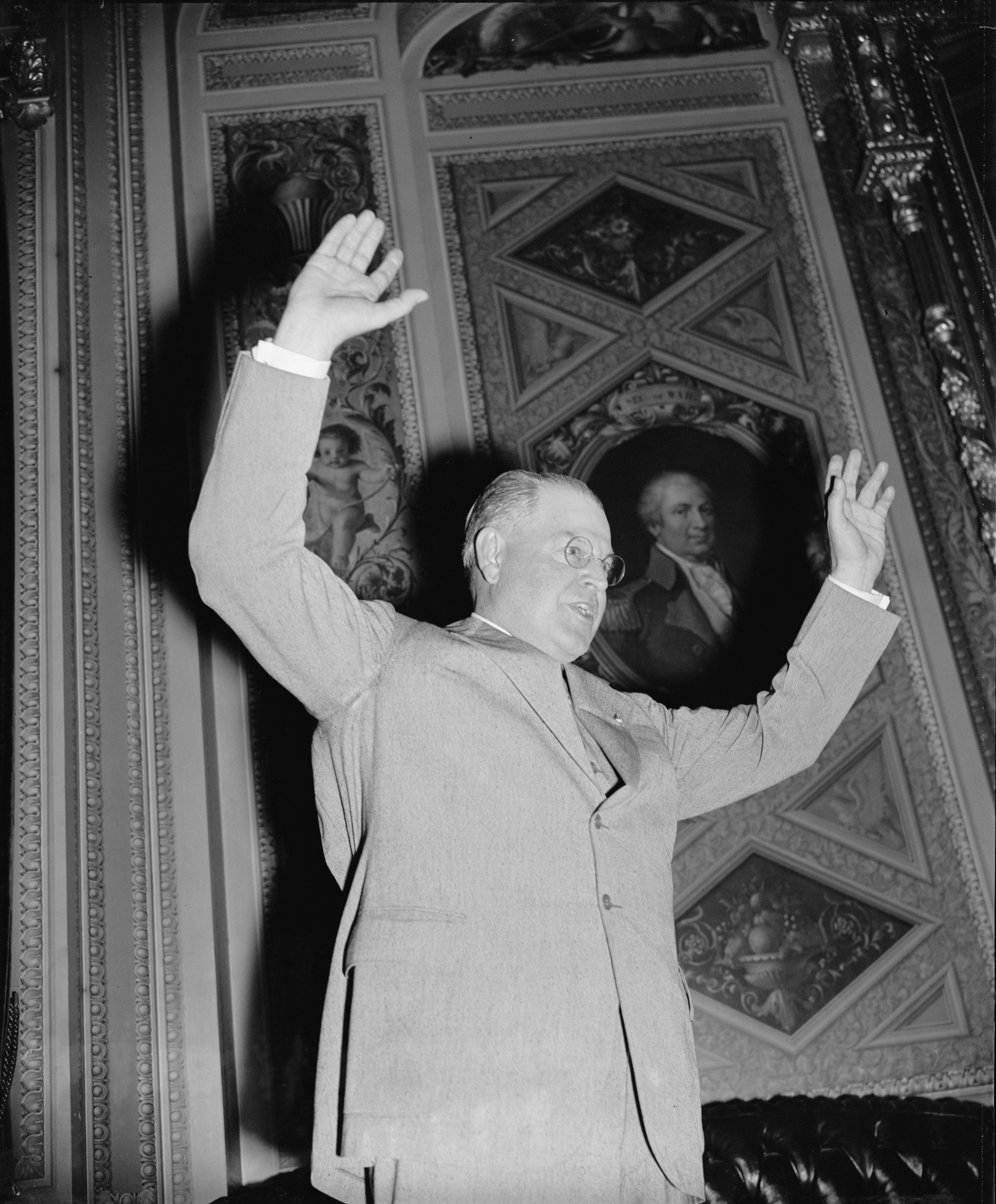
United States Senator Warren Austin speaking during an all-night filibuster

A filibuster is a parliamentary procedure in which one or more members of a legislative body prolong debate on proposed legislation so as to delay or entirely prevent a decision. It is sometimes referred to as "talking a bill to death" or "talking out a bill", and is characterized as a form of obstruction in a legislature or other decision-making body. A motion of cloture (also closure or guillotine) requiring a supermajority can overcome filibustering. Overcoming filibuster with a simple majority is also called the nuclear option.

== Etymology ==
The term "filibuster" ultimately derives from the Dutch vrijbuiter ("freebooter", a pillaging and plundering adventurer), but the precise history of the word's borrowing into English is obscure. The Oxford English Dictionary finds its only known use in early modern English in a 1587 book describing "flibutors" who robbed supply convoys. In the late 18th century, the term was re-borrowed into English from its French form flibustier, a form that was used until the mid-19th century.

The modern English form "filibuster" was borrowed in the early 1850s from the Spanish filibustero (lawless plunderer). The term was applied to adventurers like William Walker who were engaging in private military expeditions in Latin America. Over the course of the mid to late 19th century, the term "filibustering" became common in American English in the sense of "obstructing progress in a legislative assembly".

== By country ==
=== Ancient Rome ===
The first known practitioner of the filibuster was the Roman senator Cato the Younger. In debates over legislation he especially opposed, Cato would often obstruct the measure by speaking continuously until nightfall. As the Roman Senate had a rule requiring all business to conclude by dusk, Cato's deliberate long-winded speeches forestalled a vote.

Cato attempted to use the filibuster at least twice to frustrate the political objectives of Julius Caesar. The first incident occurred during the summer of 60 BCE, when Caesar was returning home from his propraetorship in Hispania Ulterior. Caesar, by virtue of his military victories over the raiders and bandits in Hispania, had been awarded a triumph by the Senate. Having recently turned forty, Caesar had also become eligible to stand for consul. This posed a dilemma. Roman generals honored with a triumph were not allowed to enter the city prior to the ceremony, but candidates for the consulship were required, by law, to appear in person at the Forum. The date of the election, which had already been set, made it impossible for Caesar to stand unless he crossed the pomerium and gave up the right to his triumph. Caesar petitioned the Senate to stand in absentia, but Cato employed a filibuster to block the proposal. Faced with a choice between a triumph and the consulship, Caesar chose the consulship and entered the city.

Cato made use of the filibuster again in 59 BCE in response to a land reform bill sponsored by Caesar, who was then consul. When it was Cato's time to speak during the debate, he began one of his characteristically long-winded speeches. Caesar, who needed to pass the bill before his co-consul, Marcus Calpurnius Bibulus, took possession of the fasces at the end of the month, immediately recognized Cato's intent and ordered the lictors to jail him for the rest of the day. The move was unpopular with many senators and Caesar, realizing his mistake, soon ordered Cato's release. The day was wasted without the Senate ever getting to vote on a motion supporting the bill, but Caesar eventually circumvented Cato's opposition by taking the measure to the Tribal Assembly, where it passed.

=== Austria ===
On October 28, 1897, Otto Lecher, delegate for Brünn, spoke continuously for twelve hours before the Abgeordnetenhaus ("House of Delegates") of the Reichsrat ("Imperial Council") of Austria, to block action on the "Ausgleich" with Hungary, which was due for renewal. Mark Twain was present, and described the speech and the political context in his essay "Stirring Times in Austria".

On December 16, 2010, Werner Kogler of the Austrian Green Party gave his speech before the budget committee, criticizing the failings of the budget and the governing parties (Social Democratic Party and Austrian People's Party) in the last years. The filibuster lasted for 12 hours and 42 minutes (starting at 13:18, and speaking until 2:00 in the morning), thus breaking the previous record held by his party-colleague Madeleine Petrovic (10 hours and 35 minutes on March 11, 1993), after which the standing orders were changed, limiting speaking time to 20 minutes. However, it did not keep Kogler from giving his speech.

=== Australia ===
Both houses of the Australian parliament have strictly enforced rules on how long members may speak, so filibusters are generally not possible, though this is not the case in some state legislatures. In opposition, Tony Abbott's Liberal National coalition used suspension of standing orders in 2012 for the purposes of filibustering, most commonly during question time against the Labor government. In 2022, Liberal Senator Michaelia Cash engaged in a nine-hour filibuster in committee of the whole (in which senators can usually question ministers as often as they liked) in an effort to stall the passage of industrial relations laws.

=== Canada ===
==== Federal ====
Former Conservative Member of Parliament Tom Lukiwski was known for his ability to stall Parliamentary Committee business by filibustering. One such example occurred on October 26, 2006, when he spoke for almost 120 minutes to prevent the Standing Committee on Environment and Sustainable Development from studying a private member's bill to implement the Kyoto Accord. He also spoke for about 6 hours on February 5, 2008, and February 7, 2008, at the Standing Committee on Procedure and House Affairs meetings to block inquiry into allegations that the Conservative Party spent more than the maximum allowable campaign limits during the 2006 Canadian federal election.

A dramatic example of filibustering in the House of Commons of Canada took place between Thursday June 23, 2011 and Saturday June 25, 2011. In an attempt to prevent the passing of Bill C-6, which would have legislated the imposing of a four-year contract and pay conditions on the locked out Canada Post workers, the New Democratic Party (NDP) led a filibustering session which lasted for fifty-eight hours. The NDP argued that the legislation in its then form undermined collective bargaining. Specifically, the NDP opposed the salary provisions and the form of binding arbitration outlined in the bill.

The House was supposed to break for the summer on June 23 but remained open in an extended session due to the filibuster. The 103 NDP MPs had been taking it in turn to deliver 20-minute speeches, plus 10 minutes of questions and comments, to delay the passing of the bill. MPs are allowed to give such speeches each time a vote takes place, and many votes were needed before the bill could be passed. As the Conservative Party of Canada held a majority in the House, the bill passed. This was the longest filibuster since the 1999 Reform Party of Canada filibuster, on native treaty issues in British Columbia.

Another example of filibuster in Canada federally came in early 2014 when NDP MP and Deputy Leader David Christopherson filibustered the government's bill C-23, the Fair Elections Act at the Procedure and House Affairs Committee. His filibuster lasted several meetings, in the last of which he spoke for over 8 hours. It was done to support his own motion to hold cross-country hearings on the bill so that MPs could hear what the Canadian public thought of the bill. In the end, given that the Conservative government had a majority at committee, his motion was defeated and the bill passed — though with some significant amendments.

In the spring of 2017 Conservative and NDP Opposition MPs united to filibuster a motion from Government House Leader Bardish Chagger, arguing it was an attempt by the Liberal government to limit the ability of opposition parties to hold the government to account. David Christopherson was again one of the leaders in this filibuster along with Conservative Scott Reid. Several other opposition MPs made significant contributions to the filibuster, including Conservatives Blake Richards, John Nater, and Jamie Schmale. The filibuster lasted from March 21 until May 2, when the governing Liberals agreed to drop the most controversial elements of their proposal.

==== Provincial ====
===== Newfoundland and Labrador =====
An ironic example of filibustering occurred when the Liberal Party of Newfoundland and Labrador reportedly had "nothing else to do in the House of Assembly" and debated between only themselves about their interim supply budget after both the Conservative and NDP party indicated their support for the budget bill.

===== Ontario =====
The Legislature of the Province of Ontario has witnessed several significant filibusters, although two are notable for the unusual manner by which they were undertaken. The first was an effort on May 6, 1991, by Mike Harris — later premier but then leader of the opposition Progressive Conservatives — to derail the implementation of the budget tabled by the NDP government under premier Bob Rae. The tactic involved the introduction of Bill 95 (a.k.a. Zebra Mussel Act), the title of which contained the names of every lake, river and stream in the province. Between the reading of the title by the proposing MPP, and the subsequent obligatory reading of the title by the clerk of the chamber, this filibuster occupied the entirety of the day's session until adjournment. To prevent this particular tactic from being used again, changes were eventually made to the Standing Orders to limit the time allocated each day to the introduction of bills to 30 minutes.

A second high-profile and uniquely implemented filibuster in the Ontario Legislature occurred in April 1997, where the Ontario New Democratic Party, then in opposition, tried to prevent the governing Progressive Conservatives' Bill 103 from taking effect. To protest the Tory government's legislation that would amalgamate the municipalities of Metro Toronto into the "megacity" of Toronto, the small NDP caucus introduced 11,500 amendments to the megacity bill, created on computers with mail merge functionality. Each amendment would name a street in the proposed city, and provide that public hearings be held in the megacity with residents of the street invited to participate. The Ontario Liberal Party also joined the filibuster with a smaller series of amendments; a typical Liberal amendment would give a historical designation to a named street. The NDP then added another series of over 700 amendments, each proposing a different date for the bill to come into force.

The filibuster began on April 2 with the Abbeywood Trail amendment and occupied the legislature day and night, the members alternating in shifts. On April 4, exhausted and often sleepy government members inadvertently let one of the NDP amendments pass, and the handful of residents of Cafon Court in Etobicoke were granted the right to a public consultation on the bill, although the government subsequently nullified this with an amendment of its own. On April 6, with the alphabetical list of streets barely into the Es, Speaker Chris Stockwell ruled that there was no need for the 220 words identical in each amendment to be read aloud each time, only the street name. With a vote still needed on each amendment, Zorra Street was not reached until April 8. The Liberal amendments were then voted down one by one, eventually using a similar abbreviated process, and the filibuster finally ended on April 11.

=== Chile ===
In 1993, Jorge Ulloa of the Independent Democratic Union held a six-hour-long speech at the Chamber of Deputies in Valparaíso, to allow Pablo Longueira to arrive from Concepción and vote on the impeachment of three Supreme Court justices. In the Chamber of Deputies of Chile, on November 8, 2021, Jaime Naranjo, deputy from the Socialist Party, spoke for almost 15 hours during the discussion of the impeachment against President Sebastián Piñera, allowing for Broad Front's Gonzalo Winter and Giorgio Jackson (both on a COVID-19 close contact pre-emptive quarantine until that midnight) to arrive in Congress to participate in the session. Christian Democratic Jorge Sabag was in Chillán and had a PCR test taken earlier that day; although initially refusing to attend the session, members of the Christian Democratic Party board convinced him to make the trip to Valparaíso, arriving that night, just after Jackson and Winter. Their votes were essential to impeach Piñera.

=== France ===
In France, since the duration of speeches themselves are limited, points of order (rappels au règlement) and especially amendments are popular tools for parliamentary obstructionism. The record number of amendments occurred in August 2006; the left-wing opposition submitted 137,449 amendments to the proposed law bringing the share in Gaz de France owned by the French state from 80% to 34% in order to allow for the merger between Gaz de France and Suez. Normal parliamentary procedure would have required 10 years to vote on all the amendments.

The French constitution gives the government two options to defeat such a filibuster. The first such option was originally the use of the article 49 paragraph 3 procedure, according to which the law was adopted unless a majority is reached on a no-confidence motion (A reform of July 2008 resulted in this power being restricted to budgetary measures only, plus one time each ordinary session — i.e. from October to June — on any bill. Before this reform, article 49.3 was frequently used, especially when the government lacked a majority in the National Assembly to support the text but still enough to avoid a no-confidence vote). The second option is article 44 paragraph 3, through which the government can force a global vote on all amendments it did not approve or submit itself.

In the end, the government did not have to use either of those procedures. As the parliamentary debate started, the left-wing opposition chose to withdraw all the amendments to allow for the vote to proceed. The 'filibuster' was aborted because the opposition to the privatisation of Gaz de France appeared to lack support amongst the general population. It also appeared that this privatisation law could be used by the left-wing in the presidential election of 2007 as a political argument. Indeed, Nicolas Sarkozy — president of the Union pour un Mouvement Populaire (UMP, the right-wing party), Interior Minister, former Finance Minister and future President — had previously promised that the share owned by the French government in Gaz de France would never go below 70%.

=== Hong Kong ===
The first incidence of filibuster in the Legislative Council (LegCo) after the Handover occurred during the second reading of the Provision of Municipal Services (Reorganization) Bill in 1999, which aimed at dissolving the partially elected Urban Council and Regional Council. As the absence of some pro-Establishment legislators would mean an inadequate support for the passing of the bill, the Pro-establishment Camp filibustered along with Michael Suen, then Secretary for Constitutional Affairs; voting on the bill was delayed until the following day so the absentees could cast their votes. Though the filibuster was criticised by the pro-democracy camp, Lau Kong-wah of the Democratic Alliance for the Betterment and Progress of Hong Kong (DAB) defended their actions, saying "it (a filibuster) is totally acceptable in a parliamentary assembly."

Legislators of the Pro-democracy Camp filibustered during a debate about financing the construction of the Guangzhou-Shenzhen-Hong Kong Express Rail Link by raising many questions on very minor issues, delaying the passing of the bill from December 18, 2009, to January 16, 2010. The Legislative Council Building was surrounded by thousands of anti–high-speed rail protesters during the course of the meetings. In 2012, Albert Chan and Wong Yuk-man of People Power submitted a total of 1306 amendments to the Legislative Council (Amendment) Bill, by which the government attempted to forbid lawmakers from participating in by-elections after their resignation. The bill was a response to the so-called Five Constituencies Referendum, in which 5 lawmakers from the pro-democracy camp resigned and then joined the by-election, claiming that it would affirm the public's support to push forward electoral reform. The pro-democracy camp strongly opposed the bill, saying it was a deprivation of the citizens' political rights. As a result of the filibuster, the LegCo carried on multiple overnight debates on the amendments. In the morning of May 17, 2012, the President of the LegCo, Jasper Tsang, terminated the debate, citing Article 92 of the Rules of Procedure of LegCo: "In any matter not provided for in these Rules of Procedure, the practice and procedure to be followed in the Council shall be such as may be decided by the President who may, if he thinks fit, be guided by the practice and procedure of other legislatures." In the end, all motions to amend the bill were defeated and the bill was passed.

To ban filibuster, Ip Kwok-him of the DAB sought to limit each member to move only one motion, by amending the procedures of the Finance Committee and its two subcommittees in 2013. All 27 members from pan-democracy camp submitted 1.9 million amendments. The Secretariat estimated that 408 man-months (each containing 156 working hours) were needed to vet the facts and accuracy of the motions, and — if all amendments were admitted by the chairman — the voting time would take 23,868 two-hour meetings.

=== Iceland ===
Since 1 January 2008, there have been time limits on all speeches made by members of the Althing. But while members (other than the sponsor of the bill or cabinet ministers) are restricted to two speeches each on the first and third readings, no such restriction exists for the second reading. This lets members take turns talking indefinitely to stop a bill from receiving a vote. By a majority vote, the Althing may forcefully end debate on a bill; this was last used in 2025 after a 160-hour debate, and had previously not been used since 1959.

=== India ===
The Rajya Sabha (Council of States), which is the upper house in the Indian bicameral legislature, allows for a debate to be brought to a close with a simple majority decision of the house, on a closure motion so introduced by any member. On the other hand, the Lok Sabha (Council of the people) — the lower house — leaves the closure of the debate to the discretion of the speaker once a motion to end the debate is moved by a member.

=== Iran ===
During Iranian oil nationalisation, the filibustering speech of Hossain Makki, the National Front deputy, took four days, and made the pro-British and pro-royalists in the Majlis inactive. Makki forestalled the vote by talking about the country's tortuous experience with the AIOC and the shortcomings of the bill. Four days later, when the term ended, the debate had reached no conclusion. The fate of the bill remained to be decided by the next Majlis.

=== Ireland ===
In 2014, Justice Minister Alan Shatter performed a filibuster; he was perceived to "drone on and on" and hence this was termed a "Drone Attack".

=== Italy ===
In Italy, filibustering has ancient traditions and is expressed overall with the proposition of legal texts, such as motions or amendments, on which debates take place.

=== Lithuania ===
In December 2025, Lithuania’s opposition staged the country’s first-ever parliamentary filibuster to block controversial amendments that would have eased the dismissal of the Lithuanian National Radio and Television (LRT) Director General. The LRT Law Amendments Filibuster featured hundreds of satirical proposals, including a notable "cat amendment", and successfully delayed the final vote until January 2026 after the committee chair’s sudden hospitalization.

=== New Zealand ===
In August 2000, New Zealand opposition parties National and ACT delayed the voting for the Employment Relations Bill by voting slowly, and in some cases in Māori (which required translation into English). Members' Bills are not immune from filibustering. In 2007, Taito Philip Field lodged 50 amendments to a Member’s Bill introduced by Sue Bradford. Her bill, the Crimes (Substituted Section 59) Amendment Act 2007, sought to repeal section 59 of the Crimes Act 1961. A media report described Field's delaying tactic as a "crude filibuster". The proposed amendments were identical in substance, and differed only in the proposed commencement date, with each amendment postponing commencement by one additional month. The House agreed to the first amendment, following which the Speaker ruled the remaining amendments out of order. In 2009, several parties staged a filibuster of the Local Government (Auckland Reorganisation) Bill in opposition to the government setting up a new Auckland Council — under urgency and without debate or review by the select committee — by proposing thousands of wrecking amendments and voting in Māori as each amendment had to be voted on and votes in Māori translated into English. Amendments included renaming the council to "Auckland Katchafire Council" or "Rodney Hide Memorial Council" and replacing the phrase "powers of a regional council" with "power and muscle".

=== Southern Rhodesia ===
In the Southern Rhodesia Legislative Assembly, Independent member Ahrn Palley staged a similar filibuster against the Law and Order Maintenance Bill on November 22, 1960, although this took the form of moving a long series of amendments to the Bill, and therefore consisted of multiple individual speeches interspersed with comments from other Members. Palley kept the Assembly sitting from 8 PM to 12:30 PM the following day.

=== Philippines ===
In the Senate of the Philippines, Roseller Lim of the Nacionalista Party held out the longest filibuster in Philippine Senate history. On the election for the President of the Senate of the Philippines in April 1963, he stood on the podium for more than 18 hours to wait for party-mate Alejandro Almendras who was to arrive from the United States. The Nacionalistas, who comprised exactly half of the Senate, wanted to prevent the election of Ferdinand Marcos to the Senate Presidency. Prohibited from even going to the comfort room, he had to relieve in his pants until Almendras' arrival. He voted for party-mate Eulogio Rodriguez just as Almendras arrived, and had to be carried off via stretcher out of the session hall due to exhaustion. However, Almendras voted for Marcos, and the latter wrested the Senate Presidency from the Nacionalistas after more than a decade of control.

=== Spain ===
In the Catalonian parliament, opposition lawmakers started a filibuster on September 6, 2017, to stall the independence referendum.

=== South Korea ===
South Korean opposition lawmakers started a filibuster on February 23, 2016, to stall the Anti-Terrorism bill, which they claimed would give too much power to the National Intelligence Service and result in invasions of citizens' privacy. The filibuster ended on March 2 with a total of 193 hours, and the passing of the bill. South Korea's 20th legislative elections were held 2 months after the filibuster, and the opposite party the Minjoo Party of Korea won more seats than the ruling party, the Saenuri Party. As of December 2025, the longest filibustering record is held by Jang Dong-hyeok of the People Power Party, who filibustered for 24 hours and a minute before the National Assembly voted to end the filibuster on 23 December 2025. Jang spoke to oppose the bill that would require the judiciary to designate judges for trials related to the 2024 South Korean martial law crisis.

=== United Kingdom ===
In the Parliament of the United Kingdom, a bill defeated by a filibustering manoeuvre may be said to have been "talked out". The procedures of the House of Commons require that members cover only points germane to the topic under consideration or the debate underway whilst speaking. Example filibusters in the Commons and Lords include:

- In 1874, Joseph Gillis Biggar started making long speeches in the House of Commons to delay the passage of Irish coercion acts. Charles Stewart Parnell, a young Irish nationalist Member of Parliament (MP), who in 1880 became leader of the Irish Parliamentary Party, joined him in this tactic to obstruct the business of the House and force the Liberals and Conservatives to negotiate with him and his party. The tactic was enormously successful, and Parnell and his MPs succeeded, for a time, in forcing Parliament to take the Irish Question of return to self-government seriously.
- In 1983, Labour MP John Golding talked for over 11 hours during an all-night sitting at the committee stage of the British Telecommunications Bill. However, as this was at a standing committee and not in the Commons chamber, he was also able to take breaks to eat.
- On July 3, 1998, Labour MP Michael Foster's Wild Mammals (Hunting with Dogs) Bill was blocked in Parliament by opposition filibustering.
- In January 2000, filibustering directed by Conservative MPs to oppose the Disqualifications Bill led to the cancellation of the day's parliamentary business on Prime Minister Tony Blair's 1,000th day in office. However, since this business included Prime Minister's Questions, William Hague, the Conservative leader at that time, was deprived of the opportunity of a high-profile confrontation with the Prime Minister.
- On Friday, April 20, 2007, a private member's bill aimed at exempting Members of Parliament from the Freedom of Information Act was 'talked out' by a collection of MPs, led by Liberal Democrats Simon Hughes and Norman Baker who debated for five hours, therefore running out of time for the parliamentary day and 'sending the bill to the bottom of the stack.' However, since there were no other private member's bills to debate, it was resurrected the following Monday.
- In January 2011, Labour peers, including most notably John Prescott, were attempting to delay the passage of the Parliamentary Voting System and Constituencies Bill 2010 until after February 16, the deadline given by the Electoral Commission to allow the referendum on the Alternative Vote to take place on May 5. On the eighth day of debate, staff in the House of Lords set up camp beds and refreshments to allow peers to rest, for the first time in eight years.
- In January 2012, Conservative and Scottish National Party MPs used filibustering to successfully block the Daylight Savings Bill 2010–12, a private member's bill that would put the UK on Central European Time. The filibustering included an attempt by Jacob Rees-Mogg to amend the bill to give the county of Somerset its own time zone, 15 minutes behind London.
- In November 2014, Conservative MPs Philip Davies and Christopher Chope successfully filibustered a private member's bill that would have prohibited retaliatory evictions. Davies's speech was curtailed by Deputy Speaker Dawn Primarolo for disregarding her authority after she ordered Davies to wrap up his then hour-long speech. A closure motion moved by the government, which was agreed to 60–0, failed due to being inquorate.
- In October 2016 Conservative Minister Sam Gyimah filibustered a bill sponsored by John Nicolson of the Scottish National Party that would pardon historical convictions for homosexual acts (which were no longer an offence), replacing an existing law that requires each pardon to be applied for separately.

The all-time Commons record for non-stop speaking, six hours, was set by Henry Brougham in 1828, though this was not a filibuster. The 21st century record was set on December 2, 2005, by Andrew Dismore, Labour MP for Hendon. Dismore spoke for three hours and 17 minutes to block a Conservative private member's bill, the Criminal Law (Amendment) (Protection of Property) Bill, which he claimed amounted to "vigilante law". Although Dismore is credited with speaking for 197 minutes, he regularly accepted interventions from other MPs who wished to comment on points made in his speech. Taking multiple interventions artificially inflates the duration of a speech and thus may be used as a tactic to prolong a speech. In local unitary authorities of England a motion may be carried into closure by filibustering. This results in any additional motions receiving less time for debate by councillors instead of forcing a vote by the council under closure rules.

==== Northern Ireland ====
A notable filibuster took place in the Northern Ireland House of Commons in 1936 when Tommy Henderson (Independent Unionist MP for Shankill) spoke for nine and a half hours (ending just before 4 a.m.) on the Appropriation Bill. As this bill applied government spending to all departments, almost any topic was relevant to the debate, and Henderson used the opportunity to list all of his many criticisms of the Unionist government.

=== United States ===
==== Senate ====
The filibuster is a powerful legislative device in the United States Senate. Senate rules permit a senator or senators to speak for as long as they wish and on any topic they choose, unless "three-fifths of the Senators duly chosen and sworn" (usually 60 out of 100 senators) bring debate to a close by invoking cloture under Senate Rule XXII. Even if a filibuster attempt is unsuccessful, the process takes floor time. Defenders call the filibuster "The Soul of the Senate".

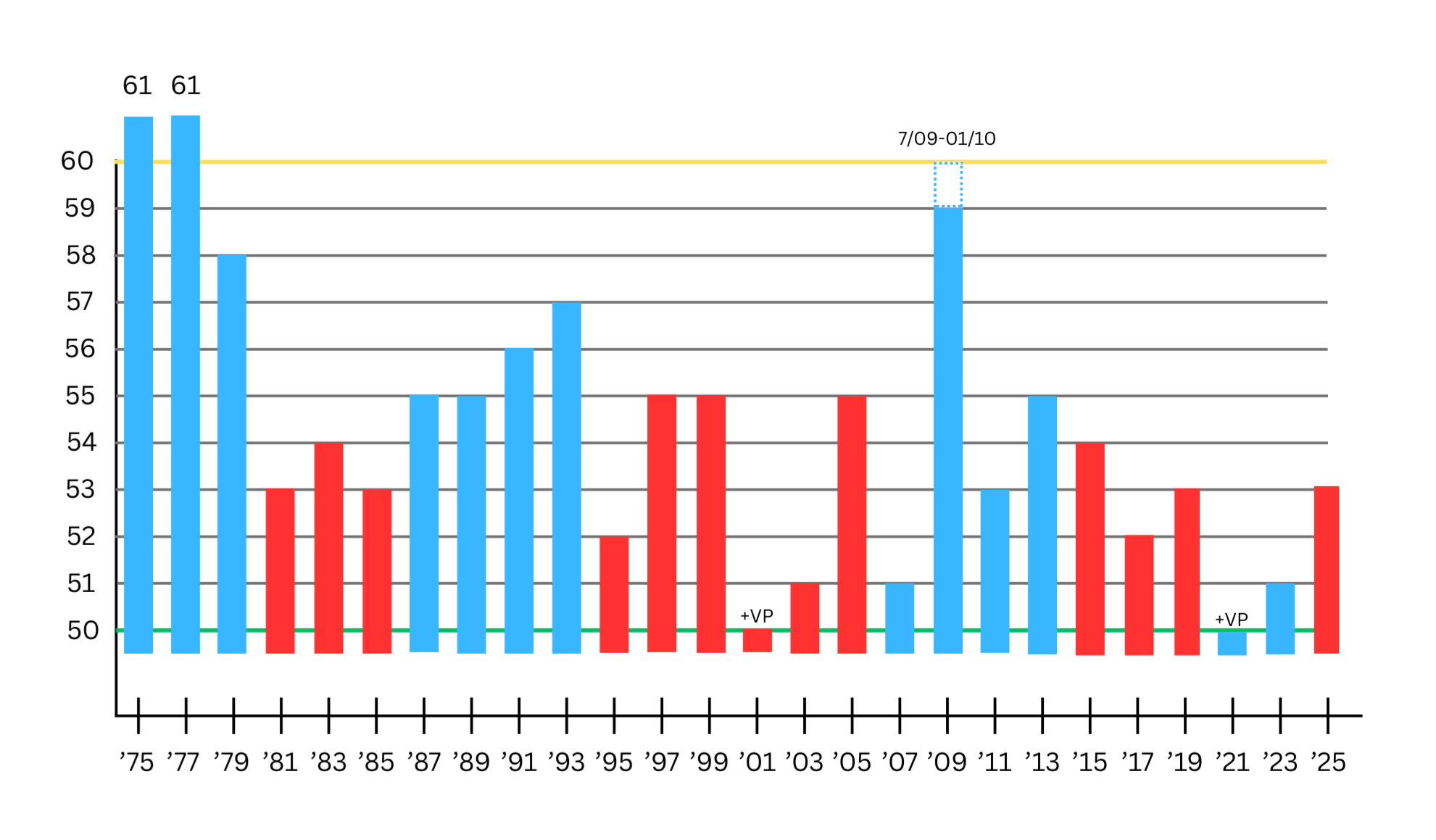
There have only been three filibuster-proof majorities since 1975, when cloture was reduced to 60 votes.

The procedure is not enumerated in the U.S. Constitution; it only became theoretically possible with a change of Senate rules in 1806, and was not used until 1837. Rarely used for much of the Senate's first two centuries, it was strengthened in the 1970s, and especially since the 2010s the majority has preferred to avoid filibusters by moving to other business when a filibuster is threatened and attempts to achieve cloture have failed. As a result, in recent decades this has come to mean that all major legislation (apart from budget reconciliation, which requires a simple 51-vote majority) now requires a 60-vote majority to pass.

U.S. Senator Chris Murphy engaging in a filibuster on gun control in 2016

Under current Senate rules, any modification or limitation of the filibuster would be a rule change that could itself, be filibustered, with two-thirds of those senators present and voting (as opposed to the normal three-fifths of those sworn) needing to vote to break the filibuster. However, under Senate precedents, a simple majority can act (and has acted) to limit the practice by overruling decisions of the chair. The removal or substantial limitation of the filibuster by a simple majority, rather than a rule change, is called the constitutional option by proponents, and the nuclear option by opponents.

On November 21, 2013, the Democratic-controlled Senate voted 52 to 48 to require only a majority vote to end a filibuster of all executive and judicial nominees, excluding Supreme Court nominees, rather than the three-fifths of votes previously required. On April 6, 2017, the Republican-controlled Senate voted 52 to 48 to require only a majority vote to end a filibuster of Supreme Court nominees. A three-fifths (60 vote) supermajority is still required to end filibusters on legislation.

While president, Donald Trump spoke out against the 60-vote requirement for legislation on several occasions. In opposition to Trump, Senate Majority Leader Mitch McConnell committed to not abolish the filibuster for legislation; in April 2017, a broad mix of 61 senators (32 Republicans, 28 Democrats, and one independent) signed a letter stating their support for the 60-vote threshold and their opposition to abolishing the filibuster for legislation.

In 2021, the Senate filibuster's past, particularly its historical usage in blocking civil rights legislation, a practice described by the Associated Press as racist, fuelled arguments for its end. On January 19, 2022, the Democratic-controlled Senate voted to change the filibuster. The vote, however, failed 52–48, due to the defection of Democratic Senators Joe Manchin and Kyrsten Sinema.

==== House of Representatives ====
In the United States House of Representatives, the filibuster (the right to unlimited debate) was used until 1842, when a permanent rule limiting the duration of debate was created. The disappearing quorum was a tactic used by the minority until Speaker Thomas Brackett Reed eliminated it in 1890. As the membership of the House grew much larger than the Senate, the House had acted earlier to control floor debate and the delay and blocking of floor votes. The magic minute allows party leaders to speak for as long as they wish, which Hakeem Jeffries used in 2025 to set a record for the longest speech on the House floor (8 hours and 44 minutes) in opposition to the One Big Beautiful Bill Act.

==== State legislatures ====
Only 14 state legislatures permit a filibuster: Alabama, Alaska, Arkansas, Connecticut, Florida, Hawaii, Idaho, Maine, Missouri, Nebraska, South Carolina, Texas, Utah, and Vermont. The Texas Senate currently holds the record for the longest filibuster on record. Starting on May 2, 1977, Senator Bill Meier spoke for 43 hours to delay the passage of a bill that would change how workplace injury claims would be published under state open records law. The Texas Senate has a three strike rule that require the member to stay on topic or else their filibuster is ended. There are also rules that require the member to stand the whole time they are speaking. In order to increase his speaking time Meier wore an "astronaut bag", which he was given an opportunity to change once during his speech without violating the Senate Rules.

== See also ==
- "Baby, It's Cold Outside" – An episode of Scandal
- Constitution of the Roman Republic
- Gag order – Legal order to restrict publication
- Gaming the system
- Justice delayed is justice denied – Legal maxim
- Liberum veto – Parliamentary device in the Polish–Lithuanian Commonwealth
- Mr. Smith Goes to Washington – A 1939 film by Frank Capra
- Obstructionism – Deliberately delaying or preventing a process or change
- "The Stackhouse Filibuster" – An episode of The West Wing
- Veto Players - a 2002 book by George Tsebelis
