= Otto Lecher =

Austrian politician (1860–1939)

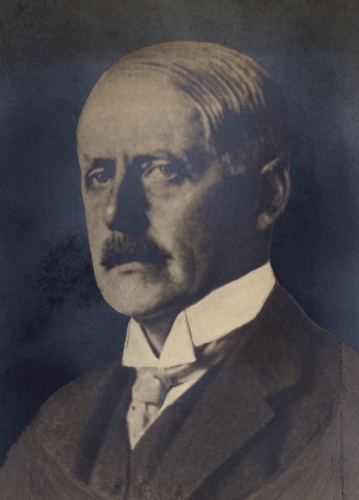
Otto Lecher

Otto Lecher (6 January 1860 – 20 January 1939) was an Austrian politician.

He was born in Vienna, Landstraße in the Austrian Empire. He earned a doctorate of law, and became President of the Board of Trade in Brünn. He was also Secretary of the Brunn Chamber of Trade and Industry. He was elected to the Abgeordnetenhaus ("House of Delegates") of the Reichsrat ("Imperial Council") from Brünn, and served for many years.

He is perhaps best remembered for a 12-hour speech he gave on 28 October 1897: a "filibuster" to block action on the "Ausgleich" with Hungary, which was due for renewal. Mark Twain was present, and described the speech, and the political circumstances which led to it, in his essay "Stirring Times in Austria".

At the end of World War I, Lecher was a Member of the Provisional Nationalversammlung ("National Assembly") which established the Republic of Austria, serving from 21 October 1918 to 16 February 1919.

Lecher died in Leopoldsdorf im Marchfelde on 20 January 1939.
