= Amie Kreppel =

American political scientist

- Citizenship: United States
- Occupation: Jean Monnet Chair (ad personam)

Academic background
- Education: University of California, Los Angeles
- Thesis: The development of the European Parliament and the supranational party system (1998)
- Doctoral advisor: George Tsebelis

Academic work
- Discipline: Political science
- Sub-discipline: European studies
- Institutions: University of Florida
- Website: people.clas.ufl.edu/kreppel/

Amie Kreppel is an American political scientist and a Jean Monnet Chair (ad personam), title awarded by the European Commission to top professors in the field of EU studies. She was the founding Director of the Center for European Studies at the University of Florida, a federally funded comprehensive Title VI National Resource Center (NRC) from 2003-2011 and again from 2017-2023. She is currently the Director of the Jean Monnet Center of Excellence at UF funded by the European Union. She was the President of the European Union Studies Association (EUSA) from 2011-2013 and served as co-editor (2014-2018) of the peer-reviewed Italian Political Science Review published by Cambridge University Press. In 2011 she was a fernand Braudel Scholar at the European University Institute (EUI) and in 2016 She was the Fulbright-Schuman Chair at the College of Europe.

== Academic career ==
Kreppel received a BA and an MA from San Francisco State University, and a PhD in political science from the University of California, Los Angeles, under the supervision of George Tsebelis. Her first academic position was in 1998 as Assistant Professor at the University of Florida, where she is currently a Full Professor. She has also had a number of visiting positions at universities in Europe, such as Vrije Universiteit Brussel, Université Louis Pasteur, Université libre de Bruxelles, the University of Exeter, and Libera Università Internazionale degli Studi Sociali Guido Carli in Rome.

== Selected works ==
- The European Parliament and the Supranational Party System: A Study of Institutional Development. Cambridge University Press (Studies in Comparative Politics) 2002.
