= George Tsebelis =

American political scientist

- Tsebelis in October 2026
- Citizenship: United States
- Occupation: Political scientist
- Awards: Fellow of the American Academy of Arts and Sciences

Academic background
- Education: National Technical University of Athens; Sciences Po; Pierre and Marie Curie University
- Alma mater: Washington University in St. Louis
- Thesis: Parties and Activists: A Comparative Study of Parties and Party Systems (1985)
- Doctoral advisor: John Sprague

Academic work
- Discipline: Political science
- Institutions: University of Michigan; University of California, Los Angeles
- Doctoral students: Amie Kreppel
- Website: https://sites.lsa.umich.edu/tsebelis/

George Tsebelis is a Greek-American political scientist who specializes in comparative politics and formal modeling. He is currently Anatol Rapoport Collegiate Professor of Political Science at the University of Michigan.

== Education ==
Tsebelis received undergraduate degrees in engineering from the National Technical University of Athens and in political science from Sciences Po. He received a doctorate in mathematical statistics from Pierre and Marie Curie University and one in political science from Washington University in St. Louis.

== Honors ==
Tsebelis has received a Russell Sage Foundation Fellowship and a Simon Guggenheim Fellowship. He was elected as a Fellow of the American Academy of Arts and Sciences as part of the Academy's 2016 class and was named the 2025 William H. Riker Prize recipient "in recognition of a body of research that exemplifies and advances the scientific study of politics". He also received honorary degrees from the University of Crete (2014), the National and Kapodistrian University of Athens (2024), and the University of Milan (2025).

== Veto players theory ==
Tsebelis developed the theory of "veto players", set out in his best known work, Veto Players: How Political Institutions Work (2002). The theory defines veto players as individual or collective actors whose agreement is necessary to change the legislative status quo. Veto players may be institutional, such as a president, a legislative chamber, or a constitutional court, or partisan, such as the parties in a governing coalition. The central prediction of the theory is that as the number of veto players increases, and as their ideological distance from one another grows, policy stability increases and the capacity for significant policy change diminishes.

A key feature of the framework is its ability to subsume the traditional distinction between presidential and parliamentary systems under a common analytical language. Rather than treating regime types as categorically different, the theory compares them along the same dimensions (number, ideological positions, and internal cohesion), allowing for cross-regime predictions about legislative output, government stability, and bureaucratic or judicial discretion. Tsebelis first introduced the core argument in a 1995 article in the British Journal of Political Science, which received the American Political Science Association's Gregory Luebbert Award for best article in comparative politics. The theory has been applied across a wide range of empirical domains, including budget formation, constitutional amendment rates, European Union decision-making, and the scope of judicial and bureaucratic discretion.

== Publications ==
- Tsebelis, George. Changing the Rules: Constitutional Amendments in Democracies. Cambridge University Press, 2025.
- ____. Reforming the European Union: Realizing the Impossible (with D. Finke, T. König, and S.O. Proksch). Princeton University Press, 2013.
- ____. Veto Players: How Political Institutions Work. Princeton University Press and Russell Sage Foundation, 2002.
- ____, and Jeannette Money. Bicameralism. New York: Cambridge University Press, 1997.
- ____. Nested Games: Rational Choice in Comparative Politics. Berkeley: University of California Press, 1990.

== See also ==
- Agenda-setting theory
