= Veto Players =

2002 book by George Tsebelis

Veto Players: How Political Institutions Work
- Author: George Tsebelis
- Genre: Non-fiction
- Publication date: 2002

Veto Players: How Political Institutions Work is a book written by political science professor George Tsebelis in 2002. It is a game theory analysis of political behavior. In this work Tsebelis uses the concept of the veto player as a tool for analysing the outcomes of political systems. His primary focus is on legislative behaviour and outcomes.

== Veto players ==
The concept of the veto player is a political actor who has the ability to decline a choice being made. Specifically in Tsebelis' analysis a veto player is one who can stop a change from the status quo. This is analogous to players in a bargaining game where all players must reach agreement.

A key feature of veto players is that they have preferences over public policy outcomes and these are continuous across the continuous policy choices the veto player faces.

There are a number of difficulties with applying the concept of veto players to political systems:

- What is a veto? Although from a game theoretic perspective it is often part of the conditions of the game that agreement must be reached, in practice determining what constitutes a veto is more difficult. For example, although the US president is said to have a veto over legislation, in fact this can be overturned by the legislature. More strikingly, traditionally the British monarch has a veto over legislation (as British Acts require Royal Assent) but this power is never used.
- What is a player? Tsebelis notes that players come in a variety of forms, and may be groups. It may be the case that the veto player is not an individual, for example the US congress. In this case how can the veto player be defined? One way is to look at the constitutional structure of the assembly (the majority of the preferences of the House) however this overlooks the influence of parties and external influences of the lobby groups and the electorate. Tsebelis looks at this by assessing the influence of the different factors on the veto player preferences, arguing that the veto player analysis encompasses issues such as party systems.

== Policy space and social choice within ==
Having established the concept of veto players, Tsebelis then applies this to social choice, following Anthony Downs' approach of continuous policy space with veto players concerned solely about proximity of choices to their ideal on a policy spectrum. Further he assumes that there is a status quo point (apparently analogous to a disagreement point in game theoretic bargaining analysis).

He argues that the status quo will only change if it is weakly preferred by all veto players (since otherwise one of the players would veto the social choice). This is analogous to saying that the status quo will only change if the status quo is not Pareto efficient for veto players. Tsebelis then suggests that where Pareto improvements are available, the social choice will be for a point which is Pareto efficient. He suggests that in the case where there are many such points, there will be mechanisms to determine which point is reached (although there is no explicit exposition of a bargaining analysis either co-operative or non-cooperative).

Tsebelis then looks at how various veto players resolve certain situation (changing the number of policy dimensions, veto players and status quo points). In so doing he looks at situations with many solutions.

Some literature claims that any change (in policies or institutional designs) will become more slow and difficult with increases in the number of veto players and/or the distance between them.

The power of individual veto players can be estimated with power index.

== Criticism ==
Some literature criticizes parts of the veto player theory, such as the assumption that coalition partners in multiparty governments are veto players. Further the prediction of veto player theory that consensus democracy is inflexible hasn't been confirmed.
