= Power index =

Power index may refer to:

- Asia Power Index
- Banzhaf power index
- Emerging power
- List of countries by number of military and paramilitary personnel
- List of countries by military expenditures
- List of countries by Global Militarization Index.
- Regional power
- Shapley–Shubik power index
- Superpower
