= List of bills in the 115th United States Congress =

115th United States Congress
←	114th	116th	→
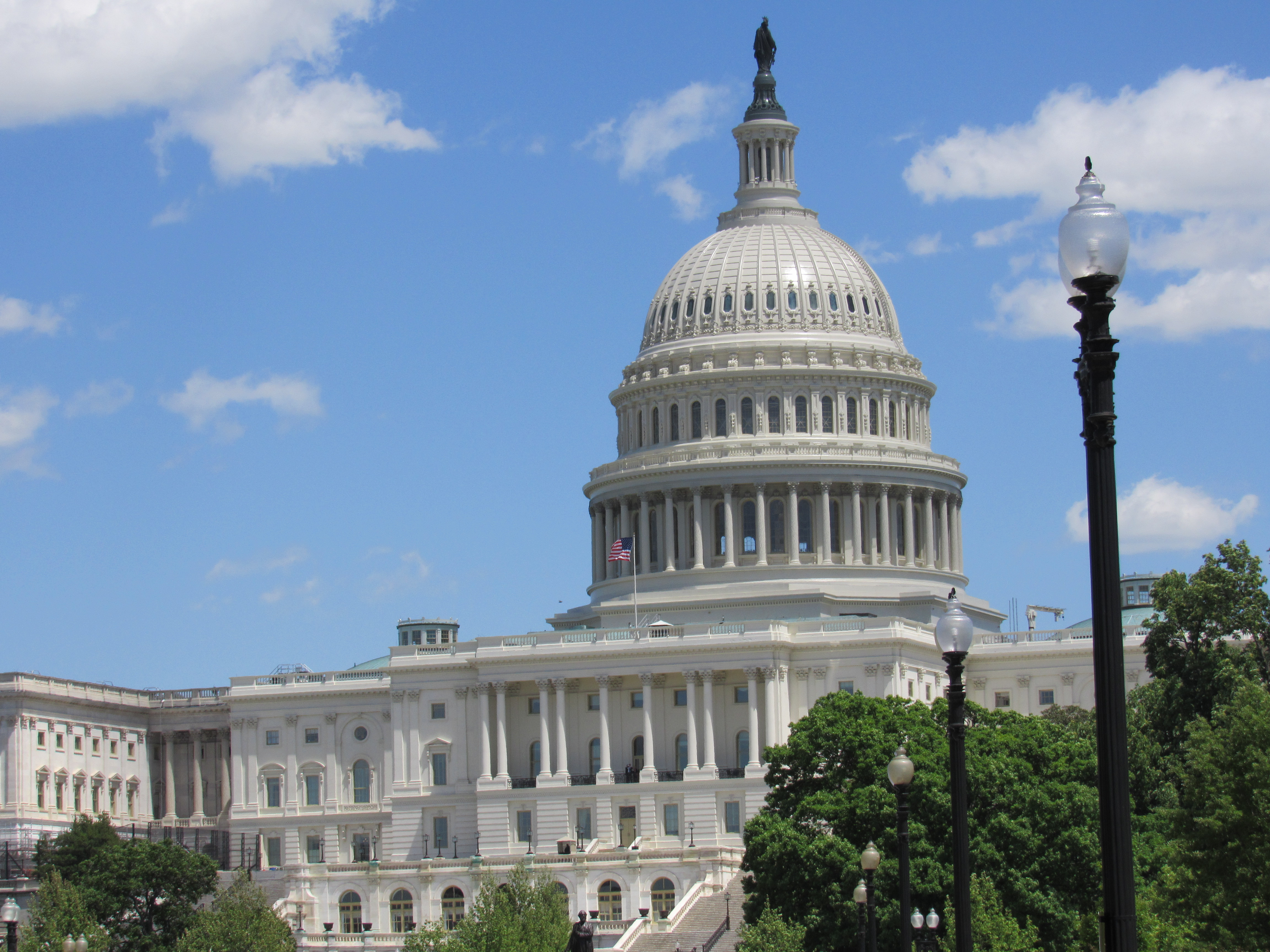
- United States Capitol (2017)

Overview
- Legislative body: United States Congress
- Jurisdiction: United States
- Term: January 3, 2017 – January 3, 2019

Senate
- Members: 100
- President: Joe Biden (D) (until January 20, 2017); Mike Pence (R) (from January 20, 2017)
- President pro tempore: Orrin Hatch (R)
- Party control: Republican

House of Representatives
- Members: 435 representatives 6 non-voting delegates
- Speaker: Paul Ryan (R)
- Party control: Republican

Sessions
- 1st: January 3, 2017 – January 3, 2018
- 2nd: January 3, 2018 – January 3, 2019

Congressional Record

Volume 163 (2017)

Volume 164 (2018)

The bills of the 115th United States Congress list includes proposed federal laws that were introduced in the 115th United States Congress. This Congress lasted from January 3, 2017 to January 3, 2019.

The United States Congress is the bicameral legislature of the federal government of the United States consisting of two houses: the lower house known as the House of Representatives and the upper house known as the Senate. The House and Senate are equal partners in the legislative process—legislation cannot be enacted without the consent of both chambers. The bills listed below are arranged on the basis of which chamber they were first introduced in, and then chronologically by date.

Once a bill is approved by one house, it is sent to the other which may pass, reject, or amend it. For the bill to become law, both houses must agree to identical versions of the bill. After passage by both houses, a bill is enrolled and sent to the president for signature or veto. Bills from the 115th Congress that have successfully completed this process become public laws, listed as Acts of the 115th United States Congress.

== Legend ==
Enacted into law

== Introduced in the House of Representatives ==
=== Bills ===
The complete list can be found on Congress's website by searching through the Legislative Search Tool.

H.R. number	Date of introduction	Short title	Description
H.R. 10	April 26, 2017	Financial CHOICE Act of 2017	To create hope and opportunity for investors, consumers, and entrepreneurs by ending bailouts and Too Big to Fail, holding Washington and Wall Street accountable, eliminating red tape to increase access to capital and credit, and repealing the provisions of the Dodd-Frank Act that make America less prosperous, less stable, and less free, and for other purposes.
H.R. 34	January 3, 2017	Safe Students Act	To repeal provisions that prohibit the possession or discharge of a firearm in a school zone
H.R. 35	January 3, 2017	Health Savings Act of 2017	To amend the Internal Revenue Code of 1986 to modify rules relating to health savings accounts.
H.R. 36	January 3, 2017	Pain-Capable Unborn Child Protection Act	To make it a crime for any person to perform or attempt to perform an abortion if the probable post-fertilization age of the fetus is 20 weeks or more
H.R. 37	January 3, 2017	Born-Alive Abortion Survivors Protection Act	To amend title 18, United States Code, to prohibit a health care practitioner from failing to exercise the proper degree of care in the case of a child who survives an abortion or attempted abortion.
H.R. 38	January 3, 2017	Concealed Carry Reciprocity Act of 2017	To allow a qualified individual to carry a concealed handgun into or possess a concealed handgun in another state that allows individuals to carry concealed firearms
H.R. 115	January 3, 2017	Thin Blue Line Act	To expand the list of statutory aggravating factors in death penalty determinations to also include killing or targeting a law enforcement officer, firefighter, or other first responder.
H.R. 524	January 13, 2017	End Trafficking of the Terminated Unborn Act of 2017	Prohibits the use of tissue from an induced abortion for research conducted or supported by the National Institutes of Health on the transplantation of fetal tissue for therapeutic purposes
H.R. 770	January 1, 2017	American Innovation $1 Coin Act	To require the Secretary of the Treasury to mint coins in recognition of American innovation and significant innovation and pioneering efforts of individuals or groups from each of the 50 States, the District of Columbia, and the United States territories, to promote the importance of innovation in the United States, the District of Columbia, and the United States territories, and for other purposes
H.R. 861	February 3, 2017	To terminate the Environmental Protection Agency.	To terminate the Environmental Protection Agency.
H.R. 1227	February 27, 2017	Ending Federal Marijuana Prohibition Act of 2017	To limit the application of Federal laws to the distribution and consumption of marijuana, and for other purposes.
H.R. 1313	March 8, 2017	Preserving Employee Wellness Programs Act	To clarify that if an employer-sponsored wellness program complies with the Patient Protection and Affordable Care Act and its regulations, the program will be considered to comply with the applicable sections of the Americans with Disabilities Act of 1990 or the Genetic Information Nondiscrimination Act of 2008 relating to wellness programs.
H.R. 1628	March 20, 2017	American Health Care Act of 2017	To create hope and opportunity for investors, consumers, and entrepreneurs by ending bailouts and Too Big to Fail, holding Washington and Wall Street accountable, eliminating red tape to increase access to capital and credit, and repealing the provisions of the Dodd-Frank Act that make America less prosperous, less stable, and less free, and for other purposes.
H.R. 1840	March 30, 2017	Reinvigorating Antibiotics and Diagnostic Innovation (READI) Act	To amend the Internal Revenue Code of 1986 to allow a credit against tax for clinical testing expenses for qualified infectious disease drugs and rapid diagnostic tests.
H.R. 2282	May 2, 2017	Equality Act	To prohibit discrimination on the basis of sex, gender identity, and sexual orientation, and for other purposes.
H.R. 2884	June 12, 2017	Communications Over Various Feeds Electronically For Engagement Act of 2017	To amend section 2201 of title 44, United States Code, to require the preservation of Presidential social media accounts, and for other purposes.
H.R. 2922	June 15, 2017	Promoting Resilience and Efficiency in Preparing for Attacks and Responding to Emergencies Act	To reform and improve the Federal Emergency Management Agency, the Office of Emergency Communications, and the Office of Health Affairs of the Department of Homeland Security, and for other purposes.
H.R. 2981	June 21, 2017	Open Our Democracy Act of 2017	To require all candidates for election for the office of Senator or Member of the House of Representatives to run in an open primary regardless of political party preference or lack thereof, to limit the ensuing general election for such office to the two candidates receiving the greatest number of votes in such open primary, and for other purposes.
H.R. 3676	September 5, 2017	Sanctity of Life Act of 2017	This bill declares that: human life is deemed to exist from fertilization, without regard to race, sex, age, health, defect, or condition of dependency; and "person" includes all such human life.
H.R. 3840	September 26, 2017	Affordable College Textbook Act	To expand the use of open textbooks in order to achieve savings for students.
H.R. 4434	November 16, 2017	Fix NICS Act of 2017	To enforce current law regarding the National Instant Criminal Background Check System.
H.R. 5485	April 12, 2018	Hemp Farming Act of 2018	To provide for State and Tribal regulation of hemp production.
H.R. 6043	June 7, 2018	STATES Act	To amend the Controlled Substances Act to provide for a new rule regarding the application of the Act to marijuana, and for other purposes.

=== Concurrent resolutions ===
Number	Date of introduction	Short title	Description

=== House joint resolutions ===
H.R. number	Date of introduction	Short title	Description
H.J.Res. 37	January 30, 2017	Disapproving the rule submitted by the Department of Defense, the General Services Administration, and the National Aeronautics and Space Administration relating to the Federal Acquisition Regulation.	Disapproving the rule submitted by the Department of Defense, the General Services Administration, and the National Aeronautics and Space Administration relating to the Federal Acquisition Regulation.
H.J.Res. 38	January 30, 2017	Providing for congressional disapproval under chapter 8 of title 5, United States Code, of the rule submitted by the Department of Education relating to accountability and State plans under the Elementary and Secondary Education Act of 1965.	Providing for congressional disapproval under chapter 8 of title 5, United States Code, of the rule submitted by the Department of Education relating to accountability and State plans under the Elementary and Secondary Education Act of 1965.
H.J.Res. 40	January 30, 2017	Providing for congressional disapproval under chapter 8 of title 5, United States Code, of the rule submitted by the Social Security Administration relating to Implementation of the NICS Improvement Amendments Act of 2007.	Providing for congressional disapproval under chapter 8 of title 5, United States Code, of the rule submitted by the Social Security Administration relating to Implementation of the NICS Improvement Amendments Act of 2007.
H.J.Res. 41	January 30, 2017	Providing for congressional disapproval under chapter 8 of title 5, United States Code, of a rule submitted by the Securities and Exchange Commission relating to "Disclosure of Payments by Resource Extraction Issuers".	Providing for congressional disapproval under chapter 8 of title 5, United States Code, of a rule submitted by the Securities and Exchange Commission relating to "Disclosure of Payments by Resource Extraction Issuers".
H.J.Res. 44	January 30, 2017	Disapproving the rule submitted by the Department of the Interior relating to Bureau of Land Management regulations that establish the procedures used to prepare, revise, or amend land use plans pursuant to the Federal Land Policy and Management Act of 1976.	Disapproving the rule submitted by the Department of the Interior relating to Bureau of Land Management regulations that establish the procedures used to prepare, revise, or amend land use plans pursuant to the Federal Land Policy and Management Act of 1976.
H.J.Res. 57	February 1, 2017	Providing for congressional disapproval under chapter 8 of title 5, United States Code, of the rule submitted by the Department of Education relating to accountability and State plans under the Elementary and Secondary Education Act of 1965.	Providing for congressional disapproval under chapter 8 of title 5, United States Code, of the rule submitted by the Department of Education relating to accountability and State plans under the Elementary and Secondary Education Act of 1965.
H.J.Res. 121	November 16, 2017	Proposing an amendment to the Constitution of the United States relating to parental rights.	This joint resolution proposes a constitutional amendment pertaining to parental rights.

== Introduced in the Senate ==
=== Bills ===
The complete list can be found on Congress's website by searching through the Legislative Search Tool.

Senate number	Date of introduction	Short title	Description
S. 84	January 10, 2017	Exception to Limitation Against Appointment of Secretary of Defense	Provides a one-time exemption from rule requiring members of the Armed Forces be at least seven years removed from Active Duty Status prior to leading the Defense Department
S. 442	February 17, 2017	National Aeronautics and Space Administration Transition Authorization Act of 2017	To authorize the programs of the National Aeronautics and Space Administration, and for other purposes.
S. 759	March 29, 2017	Currency Optimization, Innovation, and National Savings Act of 2017	To save taxpayers money by improving the manufacturing and distribution of coins and notes, and for other purposes.
S. 1006	May 2, 2017	Equality Act	To prohibit discrimination on the basis of sex, gender identity, and sexual orientation, and for other purposes.
S. 1675	July 31, 2017	Student Loan Servicer Performance Accountability Act	To promote quality student loan servicing by improving the borrower experience for borrowers of Federal Direct Loans.
S. 1272	May 25, 2017	Drone Federalism Act of 2017	To preserve State, local, and tribal authorities and private property rights with respect to unmanned aircraft systems, and for other purposes.
S. 1864	September 26, 2017	Affordable College Textbook Act	To expand the use of open textbooks in order to achieve savings for students.
S. 2135	November 15, 2017	Fix NICS Act of 2017	To enforce current law regarding the National Instant Criminal Background Check System.
S. 2311	January 16, 2018	Pain-Capable Unborn Child Protection Act	To make it a crime for any person to perform or attempt to perform an abortion if the probable post-fertilization age of the fetus is 20 weeks or more.
S. 2667	April 12, 2017	Hemp Farming Act of 2018	To provide for State and Tribal regulation of hemp production.
S. 3032	June 7, 2018	STATES Act	To amend the Controlled Substances Act to provide for a new rule regarding the application of the Act to marihuana, and for other purposes.

=== Concurrent resolutions ===
Senate number	Date of introduction	Short title	Description

=== Senate joint resolutions ===
Senate number	Date of introduction	Short title	Description

== See also ==
- List of United States federal legislation
- List of acts of the 115th United States Congress
- Procedures of the United States Congress
