= Vote-a-rama =

U.S. Congress legislative procedure

A vote-a-rama (or vote-arama, vote-athon) is a procedure in the United States Senate that allows senators to propose an unlimited number of amendments to budget-related measures. After brief debate, the amendments are each voted on in rapid succession.

Vote-a-ramas have been a fixture of Senate budget and reconciliation bills since the 1990s. They are primarily a political messaging tool, as they allow individual senators to force votes on divisive or controversial amendments that would not ordinarily be allowed by the majority leader.

== History ==
In the United States Senate, vote-a-ramas have been a feature of the consideration of budget resolutions and reconciliation bills since the 1980s, and they became a fixture since conflict between the political parties intensified in the mid-1990s. The term "vote-a-rama" appears to have been coined by Senator Trent Lott, then the Republican majority whip, in 1996.

The practice of vote-a-rama developed by custom through agreements between party leaders to accelerate voting on amendments after the 50 hours for debate allotted by the 1974 Budget Act expire. The rules for Senate vote-a-ramas in their current form were first agreed upon in 1993 when the statutory time expired on the fifth day of the budget resolution's consideration. Since then, each vote-a-rama including the amendments to be voted on has been regulated by unanimous consent agreements negotiated between party leaders.

== Procedure ==
Vote-a-ramas are possible because the Budget Act limits the time for debate but not the "consideration" of all budget measures, which means that every amendment is voted on. Nonetheless, amendments are disallowed if they are not germane to the bill (i.e. do not pertain to its subject matter) or violate the Byrd Rule.

In the Senate, for each amendment, its sponsor and a designated opponent each normally have thirty seconds or one minute of speaking time to make their cases. Thereafter, a ten-minute roll call vote takes place. The process continues until cloture occurs, which requires a 60-vote supermajority, or until no more senators wish to propose amendments, which can take a considerable time. For example, in the 2013 budget process, it took the Senate almost 16 hours to vote on 43 amendments. In the reconciliation process, the vote-a-rama is preceded by 24 hours of debate on the reconciliation bill and followed by the final vote.

== Purpose ==
The purpose of most amendments in vote-a-ramas is not to make or change law but to be a part of the political messaging of the respective senator or party. This applies especially in the case of budget resolutions, because many of their provisions are not legally binding and are therefore a sort of suggestion to the executive branch or an instruction to the respective Congressional committee. Vote-a-ramas are attractive for this purpose because it is otherwise often difficult and cumbersome for an individual senator to obtain a floor vote on a proposal.

Amendments in vote-a-ramas can be a way to test support for a particular issue. They can also be used to signal support for an issue popular with the sponsor's political base, or parties may use them to try to force the other party's members to take a position that is unpopular or divisive in their party or constituency, so that their vote can later be used against them in political campaigning.

Apart from that, vote-a-ramas are also an important vehicle for the minority party to ensure that their amendments receive a vote. That is because in the normal course of business the majority can often prevent a vote on amendments offered by the minority by procedural maneuvers such as "filling the amendment tree."

== Statistics ==
The Senate website lists 61 vote-a-ramas that have occurred since 1977, defined as "legislation the Senate voted on 15 or more times in one day". The one with the most roll call votes (44) was the budget resolution of March 13, 2008. The Congressional Research Service notes that in the Senate, "between 1993 and 2009, an average of 78 amendments to the budget resolution were offered per year during floor consideration, with an average of 26 (33%) of those being debated and disposed of before the expiration of time", and the remainder being disposed of in the vote-a-rama.
