= Inventory revolving line of credit =

An inventory revolving line of credit is a form of an asset based loan that is specifically collateralized by inventory held for sale. Rather than amortizing the principal amount over time, revolving lines of credit (revolvers) solely accrue interest on the outstanding balance and is charged in arrears. As long as inventory is replenished, the borrower can redraw upon their line of credit to up to their borrowing base availability determined by the facilities advance rate. Advance rates are typically 20% to 65% of inventory at cost, and may be capped by Net Orderly Liquidation Values.

== Usage ==
This type of loan is typically used by E-commerce as well as Brick and Mortar retailers who need to maintain high levels of inventory in order to meet immediate order fulfillment expectations. Because these companies continue to maintain high inventory levels throughout their lifecycle and inventory levels can experience brief or sometimes seasonal fluctuations, revolving lines of credit are a common financing solution. Inventory revolving lines of credit are most typically used to keep vendor payments current and replenish inventory as it is sold. While many small companies may use Merchant Cash Advances to obtain supplementary working capital, these become very costly as a company scales and amortize quickly. Companies with high levels of inventory often used asset secured loans instead as a stepping stone to obtain an unsecured bank financed line of credit.

== Borrowing base and collateral monitoring ==
Availability under an inventory revolving line of credit is generally determined through a borrowing base, which links the amount that may be borrowed to the value of eligible collateral. In inventory financing, lenders commonly exclude obsolete, slow-moving, or otherwise ineligible inventory from the borrowing base and apply an advance rate to the remaining eligible inventory. Inventory advance rates are generally lower than advance rates for accounts receivable because inventory may be harder to value, store, insure, monitor, and liquidate.

Because the collateral value changes as inventory is sold, replaced, written down, or becomes obsolete, lenders typically require periodic borrowing-base certificates and may conduct field examinations or appraisals to verify collateral quality and availability. These controls are intended to reduce the risk that loan advances exceed the realizable value of the pledged inventory.
