= DSPA (disambiguation) =

DSPA is an acronym for the Dutch Society for the Protection of Animals

DSPA may also refer to:

== Science ==
- Data Science and Predictive Analytics, a textbook authored by Ivo D. Dinov
- DNA Specimen Provenance Assignment
- a type of synthetic phospholipid derivative
- Desmodus rotundus salivary plasminogen activator, basis for Desmoteplase

== Organizations ==
- Pyotr Alexeyev' Resistance Movement (DSPA), a former left-wing political organization in Russia
- Deadly Serious Party of Australia, a former political party
- Danish School of Public Administration, a civil organization partnered with School of Senior Civil Service
- Drone Service Providers Alliance, an organization associated with the Drone Federalism Act of 2017
