= Booyami =

American accounting software company

- Industry: e-commerce, computer software
- Founded: March 14, 2011; 15 years ago in Mercer Island, Washington, United States (Note: The founding date of Booyami is sometimes reported incorrectly as ″August 2011.″ The confusion stems from the fact that the company was incorporated in Delaware on March 14, 2011, but registered for business in Washington state on August 11, 2011.)
- Founders: James Walter, Corey Ross
- Headquarters: 9725 SE 36th Street Suite 300, Mercer Island, Washington, United States
- Brands: Finagraph, BBC Easy, Finagraph Academy
- Total equity: $3.1 million (2016)
- Number of employees: 13 (2015)
- Divisions: Finagraph, BBC Easy, Finagraph Academy
- Website: finagraph.com, bbceasy.com, finagraphacademy.com

Booyami Inc. (also often referred by its brand names Finagraph or BBC Easy) is a provider of automation tools and business intelligence software for small business accounting. The company was founded in 2011 by a former Microsoft employee James Walter and a former vice-president of Bank of America, Corey Ross. The synergy produced BBC Easy and Finagraph — two technological solutions for small business that offer strategic financial intelligence and streamline obtaining business loans. After Moody's acquisition of the stake in Booyami in May 2016, Booyami announced that it now intends to expand its Finagraph service to medium-size businesses.

== History ==
Booyami Inc. was founded in March 2011 by two former Seattle area executives, James Walter and Corey Ross. With seven years experience working on Xbox and Windows 7 at Microsoft, James came from the IT world, while Corey, who held titles of vice-president in Banner Bank and in Bank of America, came from the world of banking.

Together, they conceived its first product — ″BBC Easy″ aimed to automate borrowing base certificate processing for small businesses. By the end of 2011, the company raised over $900,000 of venture capital towards patenting their ideas and towards the new hires needed for the product development. BBC Easy cloud application was launched in November 2012. In April 2013, the first financial institution, Numerica Credit Union, successfully integrated the product into its C&I loan system.

At the same time Booyami started its second product, Finagraph, designed to assess small businesses for loan eligibility. In 2013 Booyami intended to raise $1 million for the product development, but managed to raise only $195,000. Nevertheless, Finagraph was successfully developed. In 2014, Finagraph was among 20 finalists (out of 870 participants) of Forbes' New Banking and Digital Life Open Talent event. Booyami initially planned to sell Finagraph to small businesses, but changed their business model, offering Finagraph to small business for free, making money of banks and large accounting firms.

Selling Finagraph to US banks was aggravated by "the steep regulations in the industry," and Booyami searched for alternative ways to promote and distribute the product. In September 2014, Booyami raised additional $1.25 million to acquire a 15-year-old Seattle BBI Financial Academy. Booyami re-branded it as "Finagraph Academy" and incorporated Finagraph in its training courses.

In October 2015, Puget Sound Business Journal has listed Booyami in the top ten Big Data companies of Puget Sound Area. In May 2016, Moody's purchased a stake in Booyami. The companies announced plans to integrate Finagraph with existing Moody's analytics tools and further developing Finagraph to service medium-sized businesses.

== Products and services ==
=== BBC Easy ===

BBC Easy (stands for ″Borrowing Base Certificates made Easy″) is a cloud application that streamlines processing of small business loans. In order to get a loan approval, a small business needs to certify is borrowing base — a metric of the value of its assets, so the lender can determine the size of the loan that can be offered. However, the time required of a loan officer to underwrite a small loan is comparable to the time needed to underwrite a substantial loan which reduces banks' propensity to deal with small borrowers. BBC Easy simplifies underwriting by generating required forms and reports directly from borrower's accounting system, thus reducing errors, fraud, and in turn, lenders' risks. BBC Easy turns traditional borrowing base certificate submission into a single click.

After the application launch in November 2012, Booyami focused on credit unions as the primary market for BBC sales. Numerica Credit Union in Spokane, Washington was the first bank that adopted BBC Easy.

=== Finagraph ===

Finagraph is a business intelligence application which analyzes current and historical accounting data of a small business, offers strategical financial advice, and provides business owners with an overview of their business from banks' perspective, including relevant financial comparisons with similar organizations within the same industry. Finagraph is compatible with major accounting software (such as QuickBooks, Xero, etc.) and does not require any separate data entry. Instead, Finagraph ″replaces hours of work with 1-click.″

Furthermore, Finagraph can perform certain functions of BBC Easy by assembling relevant accounting data and generating forms required for a loan application. Finagraph is currently offered to clients for free, as Booyami seeks to make money of Finagraph licences sold to financial institutions. In the effort of disseminating Finagraph, Booyami has purchased BBI Financial Academy and modified its curriculum around Finagraph.

Finagraph also supports complex accounting of crowdfunding ventures. In 2014, Finagraph application was recognized by Forbes as New Banking and Digital Life finalist. After Moody's investment into Booyami in 2016, Booyami announced its intention to expand Finagraph to medium-size businesses market and to feature Finagraph with credit score information based on Moody's Analytics Risk Quality (MARQ) system.

=== Finagraph Academy ===
Formerly BBI Financial Academy, Finagraph Academy founded in 1990 provides financial education and consulting to business owners and accountants. Booyami purchased the academy on September 18, 2014, and re-branded it as ″Finagraph Academy.″ The academy retained its original curriculum, while incorporating Finagraph in its courses with the goal to promote Finagraph among accountants and business owners.

== See also ==
- Business intelligence
- Borrowing base
