= Behalf =

Behalf offered short-term financing with flexible repayment terms to U.S.-based small businesses, ranging between $300-$50,000.

Behalf pays vendors directly, on behalf of the small business, for the purchase of goods or services. Behalf has headquarters in New York.

Behalf officially ceased to operate on 01.2023.

== History ==
Behalf was founded in 2011 by Benjy Feinberg, Shai Feinberg, and Jeremy Esekow.

In January 2015, Behalf announced a partnership with MasterCard and Comdata. This partnership enables small business financing with almost any vendor that accepts MasterCard.

In July 2015, Behalf raised $119 million from Mission OG, Sequoia Capital, Spark Capital, Maverick Ventures, and Victory Park Capital.

As of February 2016, the Better Business Bureau rates Behalf as A+.

Behalf officially ceased to operate on 01.2023.
