= Merchant factor =

Merchant factor may refer to:

- Factor (agent), a mercantile agent who receives and sells goods on commission
- Factoring (finance), a financial transaction whereby a business sells its invoices to a third party at a discount
- Merchant cash advance, a payment to a business in exchange for a percentage of future credit card and/or debit card sales
