= Quorum call =

Used to determine whether a quorum is present

In legislatures, a quorum call is used to determine whether a quorum is present. Since attendance at debates is not mandatory in most legislatures, it is often the case that a quorum of members is not present while the debate is ongoing. A member wishing to delay proceedings (for example, to allow other members time to get to the chamber in order to join debate) may request that the presiding officer determine whether a quorum is present. If a quorum appears to be present, debate is allowed.

== Overview ==
What happens after the debate stops depends on the legislature in question. In the United States Congress, bells are rung in the various congressional office buildings to indicate to members that their presence is required in their respective chambers. Members of the House use the same electronic system as is used for voting to register their presence; in the Senate, one of the clerks will read out a roll call of senators, who indicate their presence when called. In fact, if any Senator "suggests the absence of a quorum", the Presiding Officer must direct the roll to be called. For practical purposes, a quorum call is a delaying measure that permits the Senate leadership to work out some difficulty or to await a Senator's arrival.

Because of differences in procedure between the two bodies, quorum calls in the House are fairly rare, but they are quite common in the Senate. In both houses, while quorum calls officially last fifteen minutes, the actual amount of time given is at the discretion of the presiding officer. A motion to adjourn for lack of a quorum may be raised after the quorum call if an insufficient number of members present themselves. However, if the business is especially important, the members present may instead move a call of the house which will force all members to attend. According to the United States Constitution, each House is expressly "authorized to compel the Attendance of absent Members, in such Manner, and under such Penalties as [it] may provide."

== See also ==
- Quorum-busting
- Procedures of the United States Congress
