= Simple resolution =

In the United States, a simple resolution is a legislative measure passed by only either the Senate or the House of Representatives. As they have been passed by only one house, simple resolutions are not presented to the President, and do not have the force of law. The resolution is used for matters such as establishing the rules under which each body will operate, it to act or speak on behalf of only one chamber of Congress. Its formal abbreviation is "H.Res" or "S.Res" followed by the respective number.

== See also ==
- Concurrent resolution
- Joint resolution
- Non-binding resolution
- Procedures of the United States Congress
