= Affordable College Textbook Act =

United States legislative bill

The Affordable College Textbook Act is a United States legislative bill intended to support use of open textbooks. It was introduced on April 4, 2019, to the 116th Congress by four senators (Dick Durbin of Illinois, Angus King of Maine, Kyrsten Sinema of Arizona, Tina Smith of Minnesota), and one representative (Joe Neguse of Colorado). Organizations supporting the bill include the American Federation of Teachers, the American Association of Community Colleges, the Association of Research Libraries, and Creative Commons.

== History ==
| Congress | Short title | Bill number(s) | Date introduced | Sponsor(s) | # of cosponsors | Latest status |
|---|---|---|---|---|---|---|
| 113th Congress | Affordable College Textbook Act | H.R. 3538 | November 19th, 2013 | Rubén Hinojosa (D-TX) | 47 | Died in Committee |
| 113th Congress | Affordable College Textbook Act | S. 1704 | November 14th, 2013 | Dick Durbin (D-IL) | 5 | Died in committee |
| 114th Congress | Affordable College Textbook Act | H.R. 3721 | October 8th, 2015 | Rubén Hinojosa (D-TX) | 6 | Died in committee |
| 114th Congress | Affordable College Textbook Act | S. 2176 | October 8th, 2015 | Dick Durbin (D-IL) | 3 | Died in committee |
| 115th Congress | Affordable College Textbook Act | H.R. 3840 | September 26th, 2017 | Jared Polis (D-CO) | 7 | Died in committee |
| 115th Congress | Affordable College Textbook Act | S. 1864 | September 26th, 2017 | Dick Durbin (D-IL) | 6 | Died in committee |
| 116th Congress | Affordable College Textbook Act | H.R. 2107 | April 4th, 2019 | Joe Neguse (D-CO) | 3 | Died in committee |
| 116th Congress | Affordable College Textbook Act | S. 1036 | April 4th, 2019 | Dick Durbin (D-IL) | 4 | Died in committee |

Previously, the bill was introduced to the 115th Congress on September 26, 2017. If passed, the program would have tried to make education less expensive for college students. The U.S. Department of Education would have coordinated funding. U.S. Senators Dick Durbin of Illinois, Al Franken of Minnesota, and Angus King of Maine sponsored S.1864, and U.S. Representatives Jared Polis of Colorado and Kyrsten Sinema of Arizona sponsored the identical H.R.3840. Later co-sponsors in the Senate included Democrats Richard Blumenthal of Connecticut, Benjamin Cardin of Maryland, Jack Reed of Rhode Island, and Tina Smith of Minnesota. Later co-sponsors in the House included a mixture of Republicans and Democrats: Carlos Curbelo of Florida, Peter DeFazio of Oregon, Peter King of New York, Mia Love of Utah, Tom MacArthur of New Jersey, and Rick Nolan of Minnesota.

Similar bills had been previously introduced in 2009, 2010, 2013, and 2015 as the "Open College Textbook Act" and the "Affordable College Textbook Act".

In 2018, Congress budgeted five million dollars for a related pilot program.

== See also ==
- List of bills in the 116th United States Congress
- List of bills in the 115th United States Congress
