= Joint resolution =

Type of legislative measure adopted by the United States Congress

In the United States Congress, a joint resolution is a legislative measure that requires passage by the Senate and the House of Representatives and is presented to the President for his approval or disapproval. Generally, there is no legal difference between a joint resolution and a bill. Both must be passed, in exactly the same form, by both chambers of Congress, and signed by the President (or, re-passed in override of a presidential veto; or, remain unsigned for ten days while Congress is in session) to become a law. Only joint resolutions may be used to propose amendments to the United States Constitution, which do not require the approval of the President. Laws enacted by joint resolutions are not distinguished from laws enacted by bills, except that they are designated as resolutions as opposed to Acts of Congress (see for example War Powers Resolution).

== Usage ==
While either a bill or joint resolution can be used to create a law, the two generally have different purposes. Bills are generally used to add, repeal, or amend laws codified in the United States Code or Statutes at Large, and provide policy and program authorizations. Regular annual appropriations are enacted through bills. Conversely, joint resolutions generally are vehicles for purposes such as:

- Authorizing small appropriations
- For continuing resolutions, which extend appropriation levels adopted in a prior fiscal year, when one or more of the annual appropriations acts have been temporarily delayed from becoming law on time
- Creating temporary commissions or other ad hoc bodies (e.g., the 9/11 Commission)
- Creating temporary exceptions to existing law, such as joint resolutions providing a day for counting electoral votes or providing for a Saxbe fix reducing the pay of an office so that a member of Congress may avoid the Ineligibility Clause
- Declaring war
- Repealing federal regulations issued by government agencies, through the Congressional Review Act
- Terminating national emergency declarations
- Amending the Constitution of the United States

== See also ==
- Bill (law)
- Concurrent resolution
- Procedures of the United States Congress
- Resolution (law)
- Simple resolution
- United States Congress#Bills and resolutions
