= Hemp Farming Act of 2018 =

United States Law

The Hemp Farming Act of 2018 was a proposed law to remove hemp (defined as cannabis with less than 0.3% THC) from Schedule I controlled substances and making it an ordinary agricultural commodity. Its provisions were incorporated in the 2018 United States farm bill that became law on December 20, 2018.

In late March 2018, Senate Majority Leader Mitch McConnell announced he would introduce legislation legalizing hemp production in his state, Kentucky, and nationally. McConnell introduced the bill, S.2667, on the Senate floor on April 12, 2018, co-sponsored by Oregon senators Ron Wyden and Jeff Merkley. McConnell announced that Representative James Comer of Kentucky would introduce a companion bill in the House of Representatives. The companion bill, H.R. 5485, was introduced on April 12, with Colorado Representative Jared Polis co-sponsoring.

In addition to removing low-THC cannabis from regulation under the Controlled Substances Act, the 2018 act would avail hemp farmers of water rights and federal agricultural grants, and make the national banking system (in a gray area for the cannabis industry (Note: See Cannabis banking in Washington State for example.)) accessible to farmers and others involved; and allow for other benefits of production of a recognized crop such as marketing, agronomy research, and crop insurance.

== History ==
Hemp production in the United States essentially ceased in the 1950s due to market conditions and federal regulations. Since the mid-1990s, there has been a resurgence of interest in the United States in producing industrial hemp. Executive Order 12919 (1994) identified hemp as a strategic national product that should be stockpiled.

The 2018 legislation was preceded by a failed Industrial Hemp Farming Act (109th Congress [House] and 114th Congress [Senate]) and a hemp- and CBD-related attempt to amend to the Controlled Substances Act (114th Congress); and the Agricultural Act of 2014, which created a regulated, national agricultural hemp pilot program under which states could create their own pilot program regulations. There existed "ongoing tension between federal and state authorities over state hemp policies" due to non-cooperation of the DEA with state programs, and lawsuits brought or threatened by farmers and states against the DEA. The DEA and conflicting Federal court decisions regarding "low THC content [hemp] and marijuana of greater THC content" left a perplexing environment for would-be producers with "general uncertainty about how federal authorities will respond to production in states where state laws allow cultivation", especially after the Justice Department's 2018 recission of the 2013 Cole Memorandum. By 2018, groups calling for de-scheduling of hemp included the American Farm Bureau Federation, the National Association of State Departments of Agriculture, the National Farmers Union and the National Conference of State Legislatures.

In April, the Senate invoked Rule 14 and skipped over committees or debate, and placed the bill directly on its calendar.

The 2018 farm bill was sent to conference committee in mid 2018. The Associated Press noted appointment of first-term Representative James Comer, a Republican Kentucky hemp supporter and the state's former agriculture commissioner, to the committee. The compromise version of the farm bill reached by both houses of Congress in late November, 2018 – after McConnell put himself on the conference committee – includes the hemp provisions of the Hemp Farming Act. Roll Call called passage of hemp legalization "an early plank of the Kentucky Republican [Mitch McConnell]'s 2020 re-election bid" soon after the $867 billion farm bill was passed by the Senate on December 11, 2018, signed by McConnell with a hemp pen.

== State reactions ==
In October, 2018, with House and Senate versions of the 2018 Farm Bill being reconciled, the National Association of State Departments of Agriculture made plans to begin harmonizing state-level hemp THC testing in anticipation of passage of the Federal act.

== Regulatory legacy and 2025 federal response ==
By late 2020, a multi-billion dollar "intoxicating hemp" industry emerged, producing and selling psychoactive cannabinoids that are technically compliant with the new law. Between 2021 and 2025, several federal courts upheld the legality of these products based on a strict textual reading of the 2018 Act. However, many states began passing individual bans or "total THC" standards to regulate such substances.

The loophole remained a point of significant contention until late 2025. On November 12, 2025, federal legislation was enacted to close the loophole by shifting the legal definition of hemp to a "total THC" standard. This revision, which extends the 0.3% limit to all THC isomers and their acidic precursors (like THCA), is expected to significantly impact the industry of federally unregulated intoxicating hemp products.

== See also ==
- Cannabis industry
- Hemp in Kentucky
