= Borrowing base =

Borrowing base is an accounting metric used by financial institutions to estimate the available collateral on a borrower's assets in order to evaluate the size of the credit that may be extended. Typically, the calculation of borrowing base is used for revolving loans, and the borrowing base determines the maximum credit line available to the borrower. Occasionally, borrowing base is also used to determine the maximum size of a term loan. Depending on the contractual terms of the loan, the assets included in the calculation of the borrowing base may be used as collateral for the loan.

== Calculation ==
=== For corporations and small businesses ===
Borrowing base is frequently used for asset-based commercial loans offered by banks to corporations and small businesses. In this case, borrowing base of a business is typically calculated from corporation's accounts receivable and of its inventory. Work in process is excluded from borrowing base. Also excluded are the accounts receivable from bankrupt customers and accounts receivable that are too old – usually over 90 days past due (in some cases over 120 days past due.)

Different proportions (or 'advance rates') of accounts receivable and of the inventory are included into borrowing base. Typical industry standards are 75–85% for accounts receivable and 25–60% for inventory, and the advance rates can vary dramatically depending on the circumstances.

Lenders' methods of assessment of the inventory value vary. A lender can hire an independent contractor to evaluate borrower's inventory or use averaging, adjusted for a particular industry. For example, Moody's is reportedly applying Monte-Carlo method over inventory price fluctuations within each industry to determine risk free advance rates.

Summary of advance rates in borrowing base calculations
| Assets | Typical advance rate | Factors that increase advance rate | Factors that decrease advance rate |
|---|---|---|---|
| Accounts receivable | 75–85% | diversification of accounts receivable | errors in borrower's reports; bad credit history of the payees; |
| Inventory | 25–60% (or up to 85% of its net liquidation value.) | | errors in borrower's reports; inventory aged, out of date, or unpacked |
| Commodities | Up to 90% | | volatility of the commodity price |

Past due accounts payable are typically subtracted from the borrowing base.

In case of revolving loans, lenders demand periodic recalculations of borrowing base and subsequently adjust the credit limit. Traditionally, banks recalculated borrowing base for businesses yearly, biannually, or monthly. In recent years, however, such 'fixed' borrowing base is deemed risky, as company's assets fluctuate in time. This consideration and the advancement of computer technology prompted weekly and daily recalculations of borrowing base. Regardless of the need of a loan, recurrent calculations of its own borrowing base is currently one of the accounting best practices.

=== For financial institutions ===
Borrowing base of financial institutions who themselves apply for asset-based revolving loans is calculated by summing up all tangible working assets (typically cash, bonds, stocks, etc.) and subtracting from it all senior debt, i.e. all other accumulated debt that does not rank behind other debt for repayment in the event of a liquidation.

=== For government organizations ===
Borrowing base of government organizations is calculated similar to that of corporations. However, in many cases there are government restrictions on pledges of some or all of the accounts receivable. Such accounts receivable are excluded from the borrowing base.

== Borrowing base certificates ==
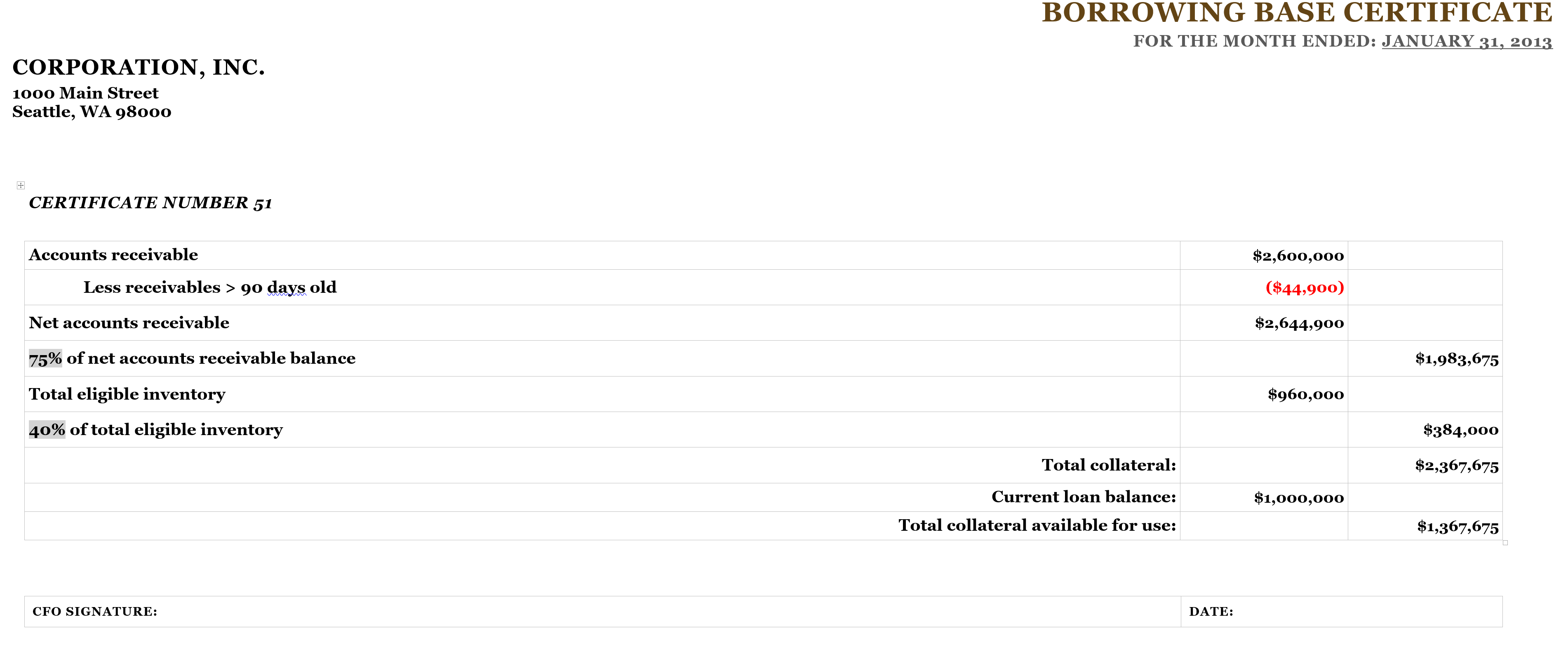
An example of a borrowing base certificate used in asset-based lending

Borrowing base certificate is the official accounting document prepared by the borrower that certifies the size of the borrowing base of an organization with the previously agreed advance rates. Borrowing base certificate includes a summary calculation sheet. In its paper form, a borrowing base certificate is signed by the authorized representative of the organization, typically by the organization's CFO, as errors in the calculation of borrowing base can result in various penalties (loan interest rate increase, demand of early loan repayment, etc.)

As lenders demand the submission of borrowing base certificates more frequently (weekly or even daily), software applications become available that can automate these submissions. For example, BBC Easy application automates these submissions for small businesses.

== Junior and senior borrowing bases ==
Junior borrowing base and senior borrowing base are calculated for the financial institutions and large corporations which have structured debt. In these cases, senior borrowing base is associated with senior debt and calculated of all assets. On the other hand, junior borrowing base is associated with junior debt and calculated of assets that are not already pledged for senior debts. Thus junior borrowing base is always smaller than senior borrowing base.

== See also ==
- Asset-based lending

== Literature cited ==
- Milad, Anis I. (February 18, 2010). Business Management Handbook Paperback. AuthorHouse. ISBN 978-1449086602.
- Taylor, Allison; Sansone, Alicia (August 18, 2006). The Handbook of Loan Syndications and Trading. McGraw Hill Professional. ISBN 0071468986. LCCN 2006006606. OCLC 64770803.
- Bragg, Steven M. (29 January 2010) [1999]. Accounting Best Practices. Wiley Best Practices (6th ed.). John Wiley & Sons. ISBN 978-0470561652. LCCN 2009047249. OCLC 746577431.
- Whitney, John O. (January 19, 1998) [1987]. Taking Charge: Management Guide to Troubled Companies and Turnarounds. Washington DC: Beard Books. ISBN 1893122034. OCLC 642999540.
- Wiersema, William (April 14, 2006). Manufacturing, Distribution and Retail Guide. Chicago, IL: CCH. ISBN 0808090240. OCLC 163811021.
- Marks, Kenneth H.; Robbins, Larry E.; Fernandez, Gonzalo; Funkhouser, John P. (April 1, 2005). The Handbook of Financing Growth: Strategies and Capital Structure. Wiley Finance (1st ed.). John Wiley & Sons. ISBN 0471726311. LCCN 2004024107. OCLC 56753022.
- Fabozzi, Frank J.; Choudhry, Moorad (March 4, 2004). The Handbook of European Structured Financial Products. Frank J. Fabozzi. Hoboken, NJ: John Wiley & Sons. ISBN 0471484156. LCCN 2004273765. OCLC 54712778.
- DeYoung, Robert; Hunter, William C. (September 30, 2003). "Chapter 10: The Future of Relationship Lending". In Gup, Benton E. (ed.). The Future of Banking. Greenwood Publishing Group. pp. 203–228. ISBN 1567204678. LCCN 2002023035.
- Schroeder, Gilbert J.; Tomaine, John J. (2007). Loan Loss Coverage Under Financial Institution Bonds. American Bar Association. ISBN 978-1590319437. LCCN 2007282718. OCLC 182518909.
- Kazemi, Hossein B.; Black, Keith H.; Chambers, Donald R. (October 10, 2016). CAIA Level II: Advanced Core Topics in Alternative Investments (3rd ed.). John Wiley & Sons. ISBN 978-1119016397. OCLC 918590725.
- Bragg, Steven M. (2012). Accounting Policies and Procedures Manual: A Blueprint for Running an Effective and Efficient Department (6th ed.). Hoboken, NJ: John Wiley & Sons. ISBN 978-1118428665. OCLC 864912888.
- Whitman, Martin J.; Diz, Fernando (May 20, 2013). Modern Security Analysis: Understanding Wall Street Fundamentals. Wiley Finance (1st ed.). John Wiley & Sons. ISBN 978-1118390047. LCCN 2013000737. OCLC 824120039.
- Terry, Brian J. (June 1, 2000) [1997]. The International Handbook of Corporate Finance. Glenlake Business Reference Books (3rd ed.). Taylor & Francis. ISBN 188899830X. LCCN 00699817. OCLC 48139916.
- Bagaria, Rajay (March 28, 2016). Buchman, Emil (ed.). High Yield Debt: An Insider's Guide to the Marketplace. Wiley Finance. John Wiley & Sons. ISBN 978-1119134435. LCCN 2015042482. OCLC 931227000.
- Koch, Timothy W.; MacDonald, S. Scott (September 11, 2014). Bank Management (8th ed.). Australia: Cengage Learning. ISBN 978-1133494683. LCCN 2014940665.
- Keeton, Ann (April 3, 2013). "Numerica Credit Union Adopts C&I Lending Program". Credit Union Times. ISSN 1058-7764. OCLC 867675674.
- Nassberg, Richard T. (1981). "Loan Documentation: Basic But Crucial". The Business Lawyer: A Bulletin of the Section on Corporation, Banking, and Mercantile Law. 36 (3). Chicago, IL: American Bar Association: 843–934. ISSN 0007-6899. JSTOR 40686220. LCCN 88019740. OCLC 60617274.
