= Salal Credit Union =

Credit union in Washington state, U.S.

Salal Credit Union is a NCUA-insured credit union headquartered in Seattle, Washington. It is the 20th largest credit union in Washington with assets totaling $656.18 million and providing banking services to more than 40,000 members.

== History ==
Salal was founded in Seattle as a not-for-profit financial institution by employees of Group Health Cooperative in 1948, and was originally named Group Health Credit Union. The company exclusively served employees of Group Health and select employee groups. In 1996 they were one of the first credit unions to offer membership based on geography instead of being tied to an employer, when they applied with regulators to offer access to residents of Seattle's Capitol Hill neighborhood. Their charter opened in 2003, allowing anyone who lives or works in Washington State to become a member. Through their business and indirect lending program, they also service members in other states. In 2010 the credit union changed its name to Salal Credit Union; the name refers to the bushy evergreen salal plant common in the Pacific Northwest.

== Cannabis banking ==
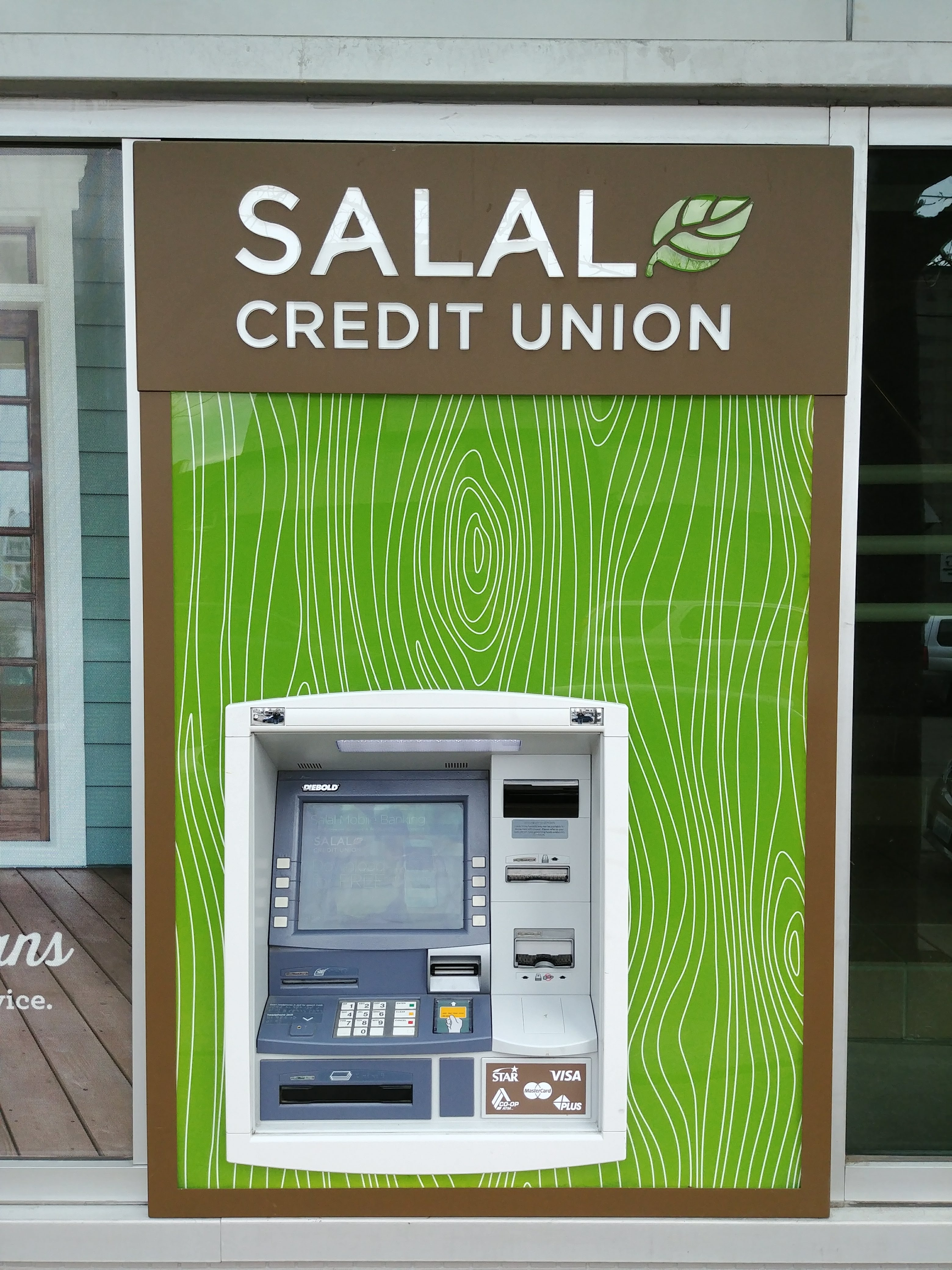
Salal Credit Union ATM

Beginning in July 2014, Salal provided banking services to the Washington state cannabis industry, reaching 270 industry customers by 2022. As of 2017, Salal and two other credit unions, and two Washington banks, would accept deposits from the industry. In 2017, a company spokesman said that up to 80 percent of Salal's net worth could be held in cannabis company checking accounts.

== Salal Foundation ==
The Salal Foundation was created in 2013 to support charitable and educational causes within the communities served by Salal Credit Union. The Foundation is governed by a Board of Directors and is a 501(c)(3) organization.

== See also ==
- Cannabis banking in Washington (state)
