= Specimen provenance complications =

Specimen provenance complications (SPCs) result from instances of biopsy specimen transposition, extraneous/foreign cell contamination or misidentification of cells used in clinical or anatomical pathology. If left undetected, SPCs can lead to serious diagnostic mistakes and adverse patient outcomes.

== Causes ==
According to recent reports from the American Cancer Society, an estimated 12.7 million cases of cancer were diagnosed in 2008. That number is expected to rise to more than 20 million by 2030 due to population growth and aging alone. The problem will likely be further exacerbated by the widespread adoption of certain lifestyle factors (smoking, poor diet, physical inactivity, etc.) that increase the risk of developing the disease.

The process of collecting and evaluating the biopsy specimens used to render these cancer diagnoses involves nearly 20 steps and numerous medical professionals from the time the sample is originally taken from the patient to the time it is received by pathology for analysis. With such a complex process executed at a large scale, the potential for a variety of Specimen Provenance Complications is a serious concern for both physicians and patients.

While enforcement of strict protocols and procedures for the handling of samples helps to minimize error, identification issues in anatomic and clinical pathology labs still occur. The most common error is a mislabeled or unlabeled specimen. Another potential complication is the presence of a contaminant tissue fragment - commonly referred to as a floater - that does not belong to the patient being evaluated. Floaters can be introduced in the laboratory during tissue sectioning, processing or gross dissection, or potentially in a clinical setting as well when the biopsy is being performed. If one of these floaters is from a malignant specimen, a healthy patient could be falsely diagnosed as having cancer.

== Frequency of occurrence ==
Medical research, reports from respected news organizations and real-life cases document the existence of Specimen Provenance Complications in the diagnostic testing cycle for cancer. One such report from the Wall Street Journal indicates that three to five percent of specimens taken each year are defective in some way, whether that be from insufficient extraction of tumor cells, a mix-up of patients’ samples or some other issue. A study published in the Journal of Urology in 2014 concluded that more than 1 in every 200 prostate biopsy patients is misdiagnosed due to undetected specimen provenance complications.

A study conducted by the College of American Pathologists extrapolated that reported misidentification errors from 120 pathology labs would result in more than 160,000 adverse patient outcomes per year. The study further cautioned that the true incidence of both errors and resulting adverse events would be much higher than can be presently measured since the research results were based solely on errors that were actually detected.

To determine an estimate for the rate of occult Specimen Provenance Complication occurrence, researchers at Washington University School of Medicine conducted prospective analysis of approximately 13,000 prostate biopsies performed as part of routine clinical practice. Published in the American Journal of Clinical Pathology, this study classified biopsy misidentification errors into two segments: a complete transposition between patients (Type 1) and contamination of a patient’s tissue with one or more unrelated patients (Type 2). The frequency of occult Type 1 and Type 2 errors was found to be 0.26% and 0.67% respectively, or a combined error rate of 0.93%. However, each case involves at least two individuals, so this error rate actually underestimates the percentage of patients potentially affected by incidents of biopsy misidentification. Furthermore, the study demonstrated that errors occur across a variety of practice types and diagnostic laboratories, indicating no one setting is immune from this problem.

Additionally, in a study published in the American Journal of Clinical Pathology in 2015, the researchers at Washington University’s School of Medicine Genomics and Pathology Services center in St Louis, MO, determined that 2% of tissue samples received in their lab for next generation sequencing were contaminated by another person’s DNA to an extent to be clinically significant (i.e. greater than 5% of the sample was contaminated).

As data substantiates, SPCs are an under-recognized problem in clinical practice that warrants further investigation and consideration of additional safety measures such as required DNA testing to confirm the identity of biopsy samples.

== Outcomes ==
In terms of outcomes, diagnostic mistakes due to Specimen Provenance Complications can have devastating results for both patients and the medical professionals involved in their care. One patient may receive an unnecessary treatment that significantly affects his or her quality of life, while the other patient’s cancer remains undiagnosed, and thus continues to advance.

An example of the consequences of SPCs is the story of a Long Island, New York woman who underwent an unnecessary double mastectomy due to a misidentification error that caused her biopsy test results to be switched with those of another patient. Consequently, necessary treatment was delayed for the woman who did have breast cancer. In another case, a young Australian woman received an unnecessary radical hysterectomy, leaving her infertile and dependent on hormone replacement therapy, after her biopsy sample was contaminated with malignant tissue from another patient.

To ensure the diagnostic accuracy of pathology lab results and prevent these types of adverse outcomes, a DNA Specimen Provenance Assignment (DSPA) also known as a DNA Specimen Provenance Assay test can be performed to confirm that surgical biopsies being evaluated belong exclusively to the patient being diagnosed and that they are free from contamination.
