= Party leaders of the United States Senate =

Party leaders of the U.S. Senate

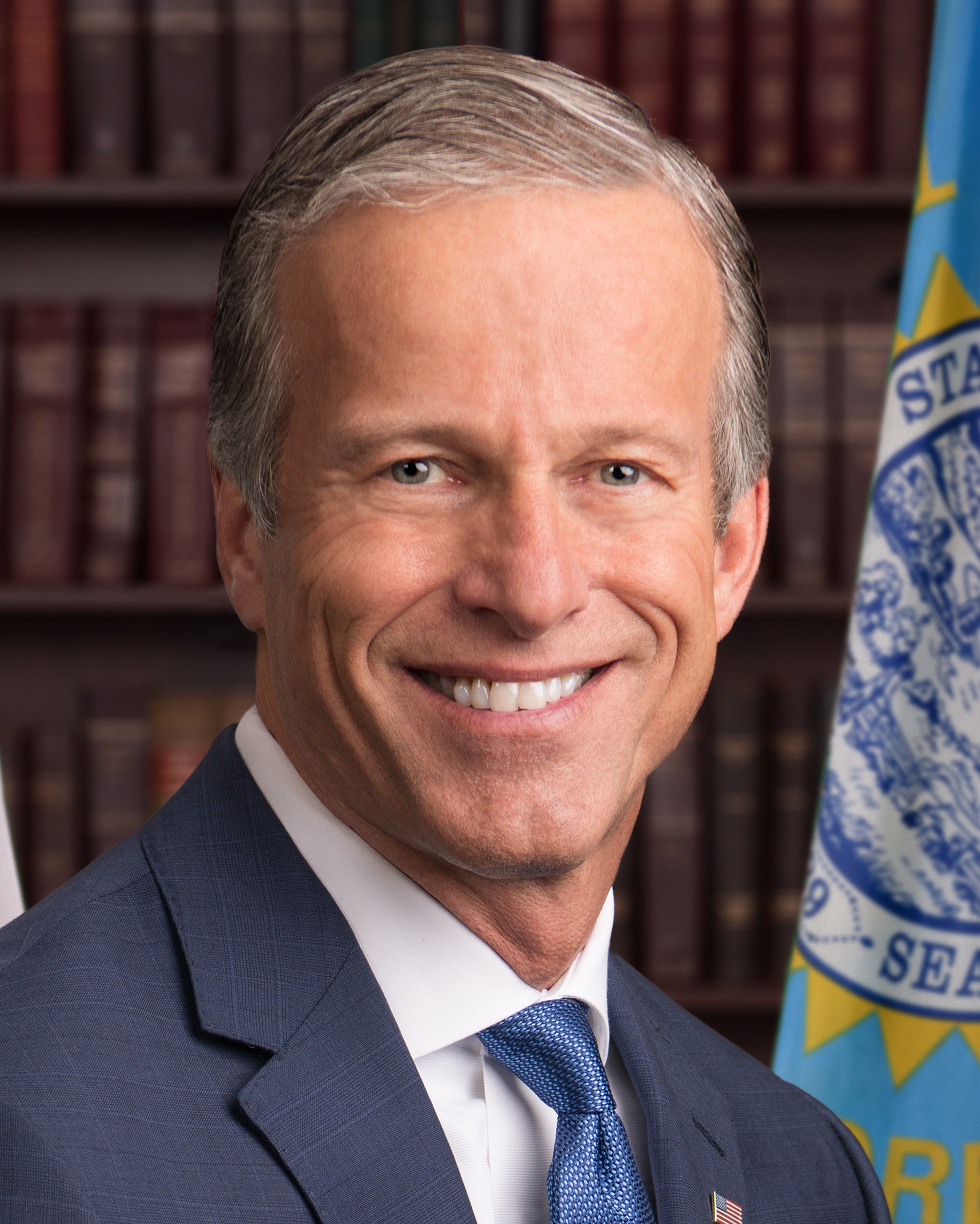
Majority Leader
John Thune (R-SD)

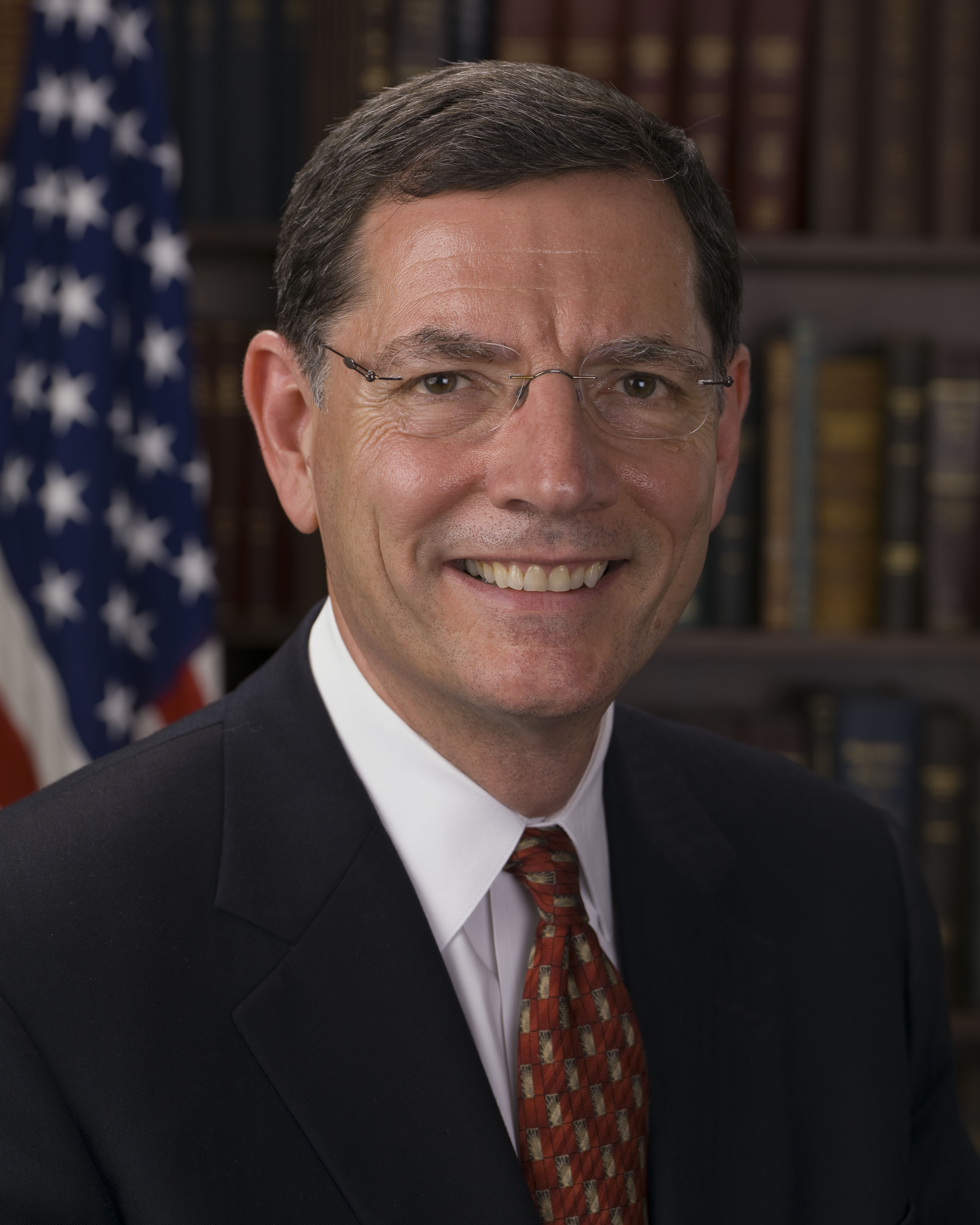
Majority Whip
John Barrasso (R-WY)

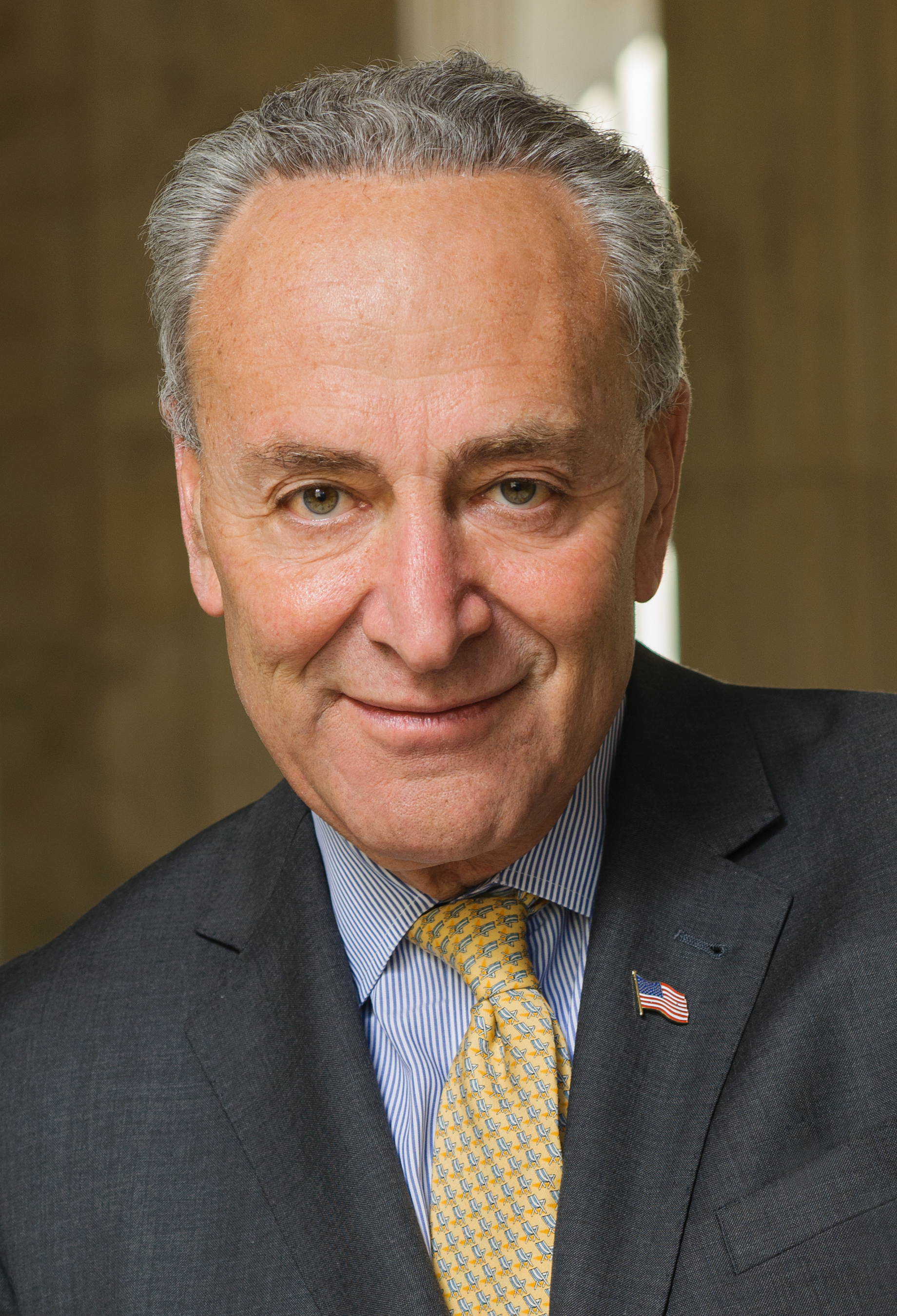
Minority Leader
Chuck Schumer (D-NY)

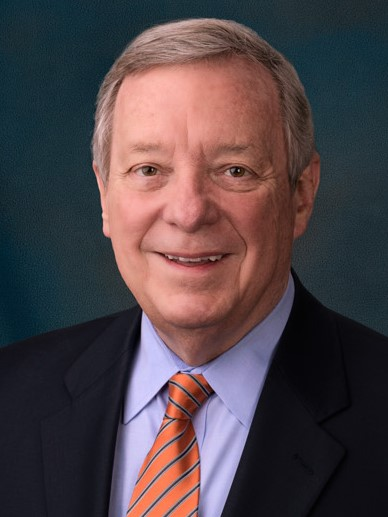
Minority Whip
Dick Durbin (D-IL)

The positions of majority leader and minority leader are held by two United States senators and people of the party leadership of the United States Senate. They serve as chief spokespersons for their respective political parties, holding the majority and the minority in the chamber. They are each elected to their posts by the senators of their party caucuses: the Senate Democratic Caucus and the Senate Republican Conference.

By Senate precedent, the presiding officer gives the majority leader priority in obtaining recognition to speak on the floor. The majority leader serves as the chief representative of their party in the Senate and is considered the most powerful member of the chamber. They also serve as the chief representative of their party in the entire Congress if the House of Representatives, and thus the office of the speaker of the House, is controlled by the opposition party. The Senate's executive and legislative business is also managed and scheduled by the majority leader.

The assistant majority leader and assistant minority leader of the United States Senate, commonly called whips, are the second-ranking members of each party's leadership. The main function of the majority and minority whips is to gather votes of their respective parties on major issues. As the second-ranking members of Senate leadership, if there is no floor leader present, the whip may become acting floor leader.

== Existing floor leaders ==
The Senate of the 119th Congress is composed in 2025 of 53 Republicans, 45 Democrats, and 2 independents; both the independents caucus with the Democrats.

The current majority leader is Senator John Thune (Republican) of South Dakota, and the current minority leader is Senator Chuck Schumer (Democrat) of New York. The assistant leaders, or whips, are senators John Barrasso (Republican) of Wyoming and Dick Durbin (Democrat) of Illinois.

== History ==
At first Senate leader was an informal position, usually held by an influential committee chairman or a person of great eloquence, seniority, or wealth, such as Daniel Webster and Nelson Aldrich. By at least 1850, parties in each chamber of Congress began naming chairs, and while conference and caucus chairs carried very little authority, the Senate party floor leader positions arose from the position of conference chair.

Senate Democrats began electing their floor leaders in 1920 while they were in the minority. John W. Kern was a Democratic senator from Indiana. While the title was not official, the Senate website identifies Kern as the first Senate party leader, serving in that capacity from 1913 through 1917 (and in turn, the first Senate Democratic leader), while serving concurrently as chairman of the Senate Democratic Caucus.

In 1925, the Republicans (who were in the majority at the time) also adopted this language when Charles Curtis became the first (official) majority leader, although his immediate predecessor Henry Cabot Lodge is considered the first (unofficial) Senate majority leader. However, despite this new, formal leadership structure, the Senate leader initially had virtually no power. Since the Democrats were fatally divided into northern liberal and southern conservative blocs, the Democratic leader had even less power than his title suggested.

Joseph T. Robinson of Arkansas, the Democratic leader from 1923 to 1937, saw it as his responsibility not to lead the Democrats, but to work the Senate for the president's benefit, no matter who the president was. When Coolidge and Hoover were president, he assisted them in passing Republican legislation. Robinson helped end government operation of Muscle Shoals, helped pass the Hoover Tariff, and stymied a Senate investigation of the Power Trust. Robinson switched his own position on a drought relief program for farmers when Hoover made a proposal for a more modest measure. Alben Barkley called Robinson's cave-in "the most humiliating spectacle that could be brought about in an intelligent legislative body." When Franklin Roosevelt became president, Robinson followed the new president as loyally as he had followed Coolidge and Hoover. Robinson passed bills in the Hundred Days so quickly that Will Rogers joked "Congress doesn't pass legislation any more, they just wave at the bills as they go by." Robinson, who had spent long hours studying Senate procedures and legislative issues, would in fact yield more influence than any of his party leader predecessors would, and would even expand and better define the power of a party leader's Senate Majority Leader post.

In 1937, the rule giving majority leader right of first recognition was created. With the addition of this rule, the Senate majority leader enjoyed far greater control over the agenda of which bills to be considered on the floor.

Until Lyndon B. Johnson became Senate leader, the position was seen as powerless as they have no power over their colleagues. Alben W. Barkley remarked that "no one can lead the Senate. I have nothing to promise them. I have nothing to threaten them with". During Johnson's tenure as Senate leader, the leader gained new powers over committee assignments.

== Senatorial role of the vice president ==
The United States Constitution designates the vice president of the United States as president of the Senate. The Constitution also calls for a president pro tempore, to serve as the presiding officer when the president of the Senate (the vice president) is absent.

In practice, neither the vice president nor the president pro tempore—customarily the most senior (longest-serving) senator in the majority party—actually presides over the Senate on a daily basis; that task is given to junior senators of the majority party. Since the vice president may be of a different party from the majority and is not a Senate member subject to discipline, the rules of procedure of the Senate give the vice president no power beyond the presiding role. For these reasons, it is the majority leader who, in practice, manages the Senate. This is in contrast to the House of Representatives, where the elected speaker of the House has a great deal of discretionary power and generally presides over votes on legislative bills.

== Powers of the majority leader ==
Under a long-standing Senate precedent, motions or amendments by the majority leader are granted precedence over other motions by other senators. The majority leader can therefore make at any time a motion to proceed to the consideration of a bill on the Senate Calendar (which contains almost exclusively bills which have been reported by the committee they were assigned to); a motion to proceed may be agreed to either by unanimous consent or through the invocation of cloture. Conventionally, no senator other than the majority leader introduces motions to proceed, although every senator is theoretically allowed to. In addition, the majority leader can block consideration of amendments through a practice known as "filling the tree", and decides which members will fill each of the committee seats reserved to the majority party; members of committees are therefore often prone to following the instructions of the majority leader, and rarely place bills on the Senate Calendar without the latter's consent.

== List of party leaders ==
The Democratic Party first selected a leader in 1920. The Republican Party first formally designated a leader in 1925.

Congress	Dates	Democratic whip	Democratic leader	Majority	Republican leader	Republican whip
63rd	May 28, 1913 – March 4, 1915	J. Hamilton Lewis (Illinois)	None	Democratic ← majority	None	None
64th	March 4, 1915 – December 6, 1915	J. Hamilton Lewis (Illinois)	None	Democratic ← majority	None	None
64th	December 6, 1915 – December 13, 1915	J. Hamilton Lewis (Illinois)	None	Democratic ← majority	None	James Wadsworth (New York)
64th	December 13, 1915 – March 4, 1917	J. Hamilton Lewis (Illinois)	None	Democratic ← majority	None	Charles Curtis (Kansas)
65th	March 4, 1917 – March 4, 1919	J. Hamilton Lewis (Illinois)	None	Democratic ← majority	None	Charles Curtis (Kansas)
66th	March 4, 1919 – April 27, 1920	Peter Gerry (Rhode Island)	None	Republican majority →	Henry Cabot Lodge (Massachusetts, Unofficial)	Charles Curtis (Kansas)
66th	April 27, 1920 – March 4, 1921	Peter Gerry (Rhode Island)	Oscar Underwood (Alabama)	Republican majority →	Henry Cabot Lodge (Massachusetts, Unofficial)	Charles Curtis (Kansas)
67th	March 4, 1921 – March 4, 1923	Peter Gerry (Rhode Island)	Oscar Underwood (Alabama)	Republican majority →	Henry Cabot Lodge (Massachusetts, Unofficial)	Charles Curtis (Kansas)
68th	March 4, 1923 – December 3, 1923	Peter Gerry (Rhode Island)	Oscar Underwood (Alabama)	Republican majority →	Henry Cabot Lodge (Massachusetts, Unofficial)	Charles Curtis (Kansas)
68th	December 3, 1923 – November 9, 1924	Peter Gerry (Rhode Island)	Joseph T. Robinson (Arkansas)	Republican majority →	Henry Cabot Lodge (Massachusetts, Unofficial)	Charles Curtis (Kansas)
68th	November 9, 1924 – March 4, 1925	Peter Gerry (Rhode Island)	Joseph T. Robinson (Arkansas)	Republican majority →	Charles Curtis (Kansas, Acting)	Wesley Jones (Washington, Acting)
69th	March 4, 1925 – March 4, 1927	Peter Gerry (Rhode Island)	Joseph T. Robinson (Arkansas)	Republican majority →	Charles Curtis (Kansas)	Wesley Jones (Washington)
70th	March 4, 1927 – March 4, 1929	Peter Gerry (Rhode Island)	Joseph T. Robinson (Arkansas)	Republican majority →	Charles Curtis (Kansas)	Wesley Jones (Washington)
71st	March 4, 1929 – March 4, 1931	Morris Sheppard (Texas)	Joseph T. Robinson (Arkansas)	Republican majority →	James E. Watson (Indiana)	Simeon Fess (Ohio)
72nd	March 4, 1931 – March 4, 1933	Morris Sheppard (Texas)	Joseph T. Robinson (Arkansas)	Republican majority →	James E. Watson (Indiana)	Simeon Fess (Ohio)
73rd	March 4, 1933 – January 3, 1935	J. Hamilton Lewis (Illinois)	Joseph T. Robinson (Arkansas)	Democratic ← majority	Charles L. McNary (Oregon)	Felix Hebert (Rhode Island)
74th	January 3, 1935 – January 3, 1937	J. Hamilton Lewis (Illinois)	Joseph T. Robinson (Arkansas)	Democratic ← majority	Charles L. McNary (Oregon)	None (Note: No Republican whips were appointed from 1935 to 1944 since the Senate had only 17 Republicans following the landslide reelection of President Franklin D. Roosevelt in 1936. Accordingly, the minutes of the Republican Conference for the period state: "On motion of Senator Hastings, duly seconded and carried, it was agreed that no Assistant Leader or Whip be elected but that the chairman be authorized to appoint Senators from time to time to assist him in taking charge of the interests of the minority." A note attached to the conference minutes added: "The chairman of the conference, Senator McNary, apparently appointed Senator Austin of Vermont as assistant leader in 1943 and 1944, until the conference adopted Rules of Organization.")
75th	January 3, 1937 – July 14, 1937	J. Hamilton Lewis (Illinois)	Joseph T. Robinson (Arkansas)	Democratic ← majority	Charles L. McNary (Oregon)	None
75th	July 14, 1937 – January 3, 1939	J. Hamilton Lewis (Illinois)	Alben W. Barkley (Kentucky)	Democratic ← majority	Charles L. McNary (Oregon)	None
76th	January 3, 1939 – April 9, 1939	J. Hamilton Lewis (Illinois)	Alben W. Barkley (Kentucky)	Democratic ← majority	Charles L. McNary (Oregon)	None
76th	April 9, 1939 – January 3, 1940	Sherman Minton (Indiana)	Alben W. Barkley (Kentucky)	Democratic ← majority	Charles L. McNary (Oregon)	None
76th	January 3, 1940 – January 3, 1941	Sherman Minton (Indiana)	Alben W. Barkley (Kentucky)	Democratic ← majority	Warren Austin (Vermont, Acting)	None
77th	January 3, 1941 – January 3, 1943	J. Lister Hill (Alabama)	Alben W. Barkley (Kentucky)	Democratic ← majority	Charles L. McNary (Oregon)	None
78th	January 3, 1943 – February 25, 1944	J. Lister Hill (Alabama)	Alben W. Barkley (Kentucky)	Democratic ← majority	Charles L. McNary (Oregon)	Kenneth Wherry (Nebraska)
78th	February 25, 1944 – January 3, 1945	J. Lister Hill (Alabama)	Alben W. Barkley (Kentucky)	Democratic ← majority	Wallace H. White (Maine, Acting)	Kenneth Wherry (Nebraska)
79th	January 3, 1945 – January 3, 1947	J. Lister Hill (Alabama)	Alben W. Barkley (Kentucky)	Democratic ← majority	Wallace H. White (Maine)	Kenneth Wherry (Nebraska)
80th	January 3, 1947 – January 3, 1949	Scott W. Lucas (Illinois)	Alben W. Barkley (Kentucky)	Republican majority →	Wallace H. White (Maine)	Kenneth Wherry (Nebraska)
81st	January 3, 1949 – January 3, 1951	Francis Myers (Pennsylvania)	Scott W. Lucas (Illinois)	Democratic ← majority	Kenneth S. Wherry (Nebraska)	Leverett Saltonstall (Massachusetts)
82nd	January 3, 1951 – January 3, 1952	Lyndon B. Johnson (Texas)	Ernest McFarland (Arizona)	Democratic ← majority	Kenneth S. Wherry (Nebraska)	Leverett Saltonstall (Massachusetts)
82nd	January 3, 1952 – January 3, 1953	Lyndon B. Johnson (Texas)	Ernest McFarland (Arizona)	Democratic ← majority	Styles Bridges (New Hampshire)	Leverett Saltonstall (Massachusetts)
83rd	January 3, 1953 – July 31, 1953	Earle Clements (Kentucky)	Lyndon B. Johnson (Texas)	Republican majority →	Robert A. Taft (Ohio)	Leverett Saltonstall (Massachusetts)
83rd	August 3, 1953 – January 3, 1955	Earle Clements (Kentucky)	Lyndon B. Johnson (Texas)	Republican majority →	William Knowland (California)	Leverett Saltonstall (Massachusetts)
84th	January 3, 1955 – January 3, 1957	Earle Clements (Kentucky)	Lyndon B. Johnson (Texas)	Democratic ← majority	William Knowland (California)	Leverett Saltonstall (Massachusetts)
85th	January 3, 1957 – January 3, 1959	Mike Mansfield (Montana)	Lyndon B. Johnson (Texas)	Democratic ← majority	William Knowland (California)	Everett Dirksen (Illinois)
86th	January 3, 1959 – January 3, 1961	Mike Mansfield (Montana)	Lyndon B. Johnson (Texas)	Democratic ← majority	Everett Dirksen (Illinois)	Thomas Kuchel (California)
87th	January 3, 1961 – January 3, 1963	Hubert Humphrey (Minnesota)	Mike Mansfield (Montana)	Democratic ← majority	Everett Dirksen (Illinois)	Thomas Kuchel (California)
88th	January 3, 1963 – January 3, 1965	Hubert Humphrey (Minnesota)	Mike Mansfield (Montana)	Democratic ← majority	Everett Dirksen (Illinois)	Thomas Kuchel (California)
89th	January 3, 1965 – January 3, 1967	Russell Long (Louisiana)	Mike Mansfield (Montana)	Democratic ← majority	Everett Dirksen (Illinois)	Thomas Kuchel (California)
90th	January 3, 1967 – January 3, 1969	Russell Long (Louisiana)	Mike Mansfield (Montana)	Democratic ← majority	Everett Dirksen (Illinois)	Thomas Kuchel (California)
91st	January 3, 1969 – September 7, 1969	Ted Kennedy (Massachusetts)	Mike Mansfield (Montana)	Democratic ← majority	Everett Dirksen (Illinois)	Hugh Scott (Pennsylvania)
91st	September 24, 1969 – January 3, 1971	Ted Kennedy (Massachusetts)	Mike Mansfield (Montana)	Democratic ← majority	Hugh Scott (Pennsylvania)	Robert Griffin (Michigan)
92nd	January 3, 1971 – January 3, 1973	Robert Byrd (West Virginia)	Mike Mansfield (Montana)	Democratic ← majority	Hugh Scott (Pennsylvania)	Robert Griffin (Michigan)
93rd	January 3, 1973 – January 3, 1975	Robert Byrd (West Virginia)	Mike Mansfield (Montana)	Democratic ← majority	Hugh Scott (Pennsylvania)	Robert Griffin (Michigan)
94th	January 3, 1975 – January 3, 1977	Robert Byrd (West Virginia)	Mike Mansfield (Montana)	Democratic ← majority	Hugh Scott (Pennsylvania)	Robert Griffin (Michigan)
95th	January 3, 1977 – January 3, 1979	Alan Cranston (California)	Robert Byrd (West Virginia)	Democratic ← majority	Howard Baker (Tennessee)	Ted Stevens (Alaska)
96th	January 3, 1979 – November 1, 1979	Alan Cranston (California)	Robert Byrd (West Virginia)	Democratic ← majority	Howard Baker (Tennessee)	Ted Stevens (Alaska)
96th	November 1, 1979 – March 5, 1980	Alan Cranston (California)	Robert Byrd (West Virginia)	Democratic ← majority	Ted Stevens (Alaska, Acting)	Ted Stevens (Alaska)
96th	March 5, 1980 – January 3, 1981	Alan Cranston (California)	Robert Byrd (West Virginia)	Democratic ← majority	Howard Baker (Tennessee)	Ted Stevens (Alaska)
97th	January 3, 1981 – January 3, 1983	Alan Cranston (California)	Robert Byrd (West Virginia)	Republican majority →	Howard Baker (Tennessee)	Ted Stevens (Alaska)
98th	January 3, 1983 – January 3, 1985	Alan Cranston (California)	Robert Byrd (West Virginia)	Republican majority →	Howard Baker (Tennessee)	Ted Stevens (Alaska)
99th	January 3, 1985 – January 3, 1987	Alan Cranston (California)	Robert Byrd (West Virginia)	Republican majority →	Bob Dole (Kansas)	Alan Simpson (Wyoming)
100th	January 3, 1987 – January 3, 1989	Alan Cranston (California)	Robert Byrd (West Virginia)	Democratic ← majority	Bob Dole (Kansas)	Alan Simpson (Wyoming)
101st	January 3, 1989 – January 3, 1991	Alan Cranston (California)	George Mitchell (Maine)	Democratic ← majority	Bob Dole (Kansas)	Alan Simpson (Wyoming)
102nd	January 3, 1991 – January 3, 1993	Wendell Ford (Kentucky)	George Mitchell (Maine)	Democratic ← majority	Bob Dole (Kansas)	Alan Simpson (Wyoming)
103rd	January 3, 1993 – January 3, 1995	Wendell Ford (Kentucky)	George Mitchell (Maine)	Democratic ← majority	Bob Dole (Kansas)	Alan Simpson (Wyoming)
104th	January 3, 1995 – June 12, 1996	Wendell Ford (Kentucky)	Tom Daschle (South Dakota)	Republican majority →	Bob Dole (Kansas)	Trent Lott (Mississippi)
104th	June 12, 1996 – January 3, 1997	Wendell Ford (Kentucky)	Tom Daschle (South Dakota)	Republican majority →	Trent Lott (Mississippi)	Don Nickles (Oklahoma)
105th	January 3, 1997 – January 3, 1999	Wendell Ford (Kentucky)	Tom Daschle (South Dakota)	Republican majority →	Trent Lott (Mississippi)	Don Nickles (Oklahoma)
106th	January 3, 1999 – January 3, 2001	Harry Reid (Nevada)	Tom Daschle (South Dakota)	Republican majority →	Trent Lott (Mississippi)	Don Nickles (Oklahoma)
107th	January 3, 2001 – January 20, 2001	Harry Reid (Nevada)	Tom Daschle (South Dakota)	Democratic ← majority	Trent Lott (Mississippi)	Don Nickles (Oklahoma)
107th	January 20, 2001 – June 6, 2001	Harry Reid (Nevada)	Tom Daschle (South Dakota)	Republican majority →	Trent Lott (Mississippi)	Don Nickles (Oklahoma)
107th	June 6, 2001 – November 23, 2002	Harry Reid (Nevada)	Tom Daschle (South Dakota)	Democratic ← majority	Trent Lott (Mississippi)	Don Nickles (Oklahoma)
107th	November 23, 2002 – January 3, 2003	Harry Reid (Nevada)	Tom Daschle (South Dakota)	(Note: Between November 23, 2002, and January 3, 2003, during the 107th Congress, Democrats remained in control, despite a Republican majority resulting from Jim Talent's special election victory in Missouri. There was no reorganization as the Senate was not in session.); Republican majority →	Trent Lott (Mississippi)	Don Nickles (Oklahoma)
108th	January 3, 2003 – January 3, 2005	Harry Reid (Nevada)	Tom Daschle (South Dakota)	Republican majority →	Bill Frist (Tennessee)	Mitch McConnell (Kentucky)
109th	January 3, 2005 – January 3, 2007	Dick Durbin (Illinois)	Harry Reid (Nevada)	Republican majority →	Bill Frist (Tennessee)	Mitch McConnell (Kentucky)
110th	January 3, 2007 – December 18, 2007	Dick Durbin (Illinois)	Harry Reid (Nevada)	Democratic ← majority	Mitch McConnell (Kentucky)	Trent Lott (Mississippi)
110th	December 19, 2007 – January 3, 2009	Dick Durbin (Illinois)	Harry Reid (Nevada)	Democratic ← majority	Mitch McConnell (Kentucky)	Jon Kyl (Arizona)
111th	January 3, 2009 – January 3, 2011	Dick Durbin (Illinois)	Harry Reid (Nevada)	Democratic ← majority	Mitch McConnell (Kentucky)	Jon Kyl (Arizona)
112th	January 3, 2011 – January 3, 2013	Dick Durbin (Illinois)	Harry Reid (Nevada)	Democratic ← majority	Mitch McConnell (Kentucky)	Jon Kyl (Arizona)
113th	January 3, 2013 – January 3, 2015	Dick Durbin (Illinois)	Harry Reid (Nevada)	Democratic ← majority	Mitch McConnell (Kentucky)	John Cornyn (Texas)
114th	January 3, 2015 – January 3, 2017	Dick Durbin (Illinois)	Harry Reid (Nevada)	Republican majority →	Mitch McConnell (Kentucky)	John Cornyn (Texas)
115th	January 3, 2017 – January 3, 2019	Dick Durbin (Illinois)	Chuck Schumer (New York)	Republican majority →	Mitch McConnell (Kentucky)	John Cornyn (Texas)
116th	January 3, 2019 – January 3, 2021	Dick Durbin (Illinois)	Chuck Schumer (New York)	Republican majority →	Mitch McConnell (Kentucky)	John Thune (South Dakota)
117th	January 3, 2021 – January 20, 2021	Dick Durbin (Illinois)	Chuck Schumer (New York)	Republican majority →	Mitch McConnell (Kentucky)	John Thune (South Dakota)
117th	January 20, 2021 – January 3, 2023	Dick Durbin (Illinois)	Chuck Schumer (New York)	Democratic ← majority	Mitch McConnell (Kentucky)	John Thune (South Dakota)
118th	January 3, 2023 – January 3, 2025	Dick Durbin (Illinois)	Chuck Schumer (New York)	Democratic ← majority	Mitch McConnell (Kentucky)	John Thune (South Dakota)
119th	January 3, 2025 – January 3, 2027	Dick Durbin (Illinois)	Chuck Schumer (New York)	Republican majority →	John Thune (South Dakota)	John Barrasso (Wyoming)
120th	January 3, 2027 – January 3, 2029	TBD	TBD	Democratic ← majority	John Thune (South Dakota)	John Barrasso (Wyoming)
Congress	Dates	Democratic whip	Democratic leader	Majority	Republican leader	Republican whip

== Chief deputy whips ==
The chief deputy whip is the assistant to the majority/minority whip and the head of the whip operations team for their party. The current Republican (majority) chief deputy whip is Mike Crapo (Idaho), who has held the role since 2013, and the current Democratic (minority) chief deputy whip is Brian Schatz (Hawaii).

=== List of Senate Democratic chief deputy whips ===
Congress	Officeholder 1	Term	Officeholder 2	Term	Officeholder 3	Term	Party whip	Majority
101st	Alan Dixon (Illinois)	1989–1993	2nd & 3rd positions not established				Alan Cranston	Dem Majority
102nd	Alan Dixon (Illinois)	1989–1993	2nd & 3rd positions not established				Wendell Ford	Dem Majority
103rd	John Breaux (Louisiana)	1993–2005	2nd & 3rd positions not established				Wendell Ford	Dem Majority
104th	John Breaux (Louisiana)	1993–2005	2nd & 3rd positions not established				Wendell Ford	GOP Majority
105th	John Breaux (Louisiana)	1993–2005	2nd & 3rd positions not established				Wendell Ford	GOP Majority
106th	John Breaux (Louisiana)	1993–2005	2nd & 3rd positions not established				Harry Reid	GOP Majority
107th	John Breaux (Louisiana)	1993–2005	2nd & 3rd positions not established				Harry Reid	Dem ←→ GOP (Note: From January 3 to January 20, 2001 Democrats were the majority; then from January 20 to June 6, 2001 GOP were in majority; then from June 6, 2001 – November 23, 2002 Democrats were back in the majority. The 107th Congress ended with the GOP in majority form November 23, 2002 to January 3, 2003; however, the Democrats remained in control of the Senate.)
108th	John Breaux (Louisiana)	1993–2005	2nd & 3rd positions not established				Harry Reid	GOP Majority
109th	Barbara Boxer (California)	2005–2017	2nd & 3rd positions not established				Dick Durbin	GOP Majority
110th	Barbara Boxer (California)	2005–2017	2nd & 3rd positions not established				Dick Durbin	Dem Majority
111th	Barbara Boxer (California)	2005–2017	2nd & 3rd positions not established				Dick Durbin	Dem Majority
112th	Barbara Boxer (California)	2005–2017	2nd & 3rd positions not established				Dick Durbin	Dem Majority
113th	Barbara Boxer (California)	2005–2017	2nd & 3rd positions not established				Dick Durbin	Dem Majority
114th	Barbara Boxer (California)	2005–2017	2nd & 3rd positions not established				Dick Durbin	GOP Majority
115th	Brian Schatz (Hawaii)	2017–present	Jeff Merkley (Oregon)	2017–2025	Cory Booker (New Jersey)	2017–2021	Dick Durbin	GOP Majority
116th	Brian Schatz (Hawaii)	2017–present	Jeff Merkley (Oregon)	2017–2025	Cory Booker (New Jersey)	2017–2021	Dick Durbin	GOP Majority
117th	Brian Schatz (Hawaii)	2017–present	Jeff Merkley (Oregon)	2017–2025	Position abolished		Dick Durbin	Dem Majority (Note: For the 117th Congress Democrats gained majority on January 20, 2021 when Kamala Harris was sworn in as the Vice President and later that day she swore in three Democrats: Alex Padilla, Jon Ossoff and Raphael Warnock, giving the Democrats a 50–50 majority with the tie-breaking vote by VP Harris as the President of the Senate.)
118th	Brian Schatz (Hawaii)	2017–present	Jeff Merkley (Oregon)	2017–2025	Position abolished		Dick Durbin	Dem Majority
119th	Brian Schatz (Hawaii)	2017–present	Position abolished		Position abolished		Dick Durbin	GOP Majority

=== List of Senate Republican chief deputy whips ===
Congress	Officeholder	Term	Party whip	Majority
108th	Bob Bennett (Utah)	January 3, 2003 – January 3, 2007	Mitch McConnell	GOP Majority
109th	Bob Bennett (Utah)	January 3, 2003 – January 3, 2007	Mitch McConnell	GOP Majority
110th	John Thune (South Dakota)	January 3, 2007 – January 3, 2009	Trent Lott; Jon Kyl (Note: Lott resigned on December 18, 2007.)	Dem Majority
111th	Richard Burr (North Carolina)	January 3, 2009 – January 3, 2013	Jon Kyl	Dem Majority
112th	Richard Burr (North Carolina)	January 3, 2009 – January 3, 2013	Jon Kyl	Dem Majority
113th	Mike Crapo (Idaho)	January 3, 2013 – present	John Cornyn	Dem Majority
114th	Mike Crapo (Idaho)	January 3, 2013 – present	John Cornyn	GOP Majority
115th	Mike Crapo (Idaho)	January 3, 2013 – present	John Cornyn	GOP Majority
116th	Mike Crapo (Idaho)	January 3, 2013 – present	John Thune	GOP Majority
117th	Mike Crapo (Idaho)	January 3, 2013 – present	John Thune	Dem Majority
118th	Mike Crapo (Idaho)	January 3, 2013 – present	John Thune	Dem Majority
119th	Mike Crapo (Idaho)	January 3, 2013 – present	John Barrasso	GOP Majority

== See also ==
- Party leaders of the United States House of Representatives
- President pro tempore of the United States Senate
- Vice President of the United States (President of the United States Senate)
- Party divisions of United States Congresses
- List of political parties in the United States
