= Filling the tree =

United States Senate procedure

In the United States Senate, filling the tree is a procedure by which the majority leader can prevent amendments to a piece of legislation from being voted on. This is done by filling all possible opportunities for amendments by amendments of the leader's choosing. It is not a new tactic, but saw a significant increase in usage under Harry Reid.

== Procedure ==
The Senate majority leader has a traditional right to be recognized first for the purposes of offering amendments on legislation. The term itself is a colloquial name for the diagram used to show the priority given to amendments to a bill. The trunk of the tree represents the bill, while the branches reflect the corresponding amendments.

Majority leaders fill the tree to introduce first- and second-degree amendments that block other senators from offering further amendments because the Senate cannot move on to another amendment without unanimous consent or overcoming a filibuster on the motion to put the other amendment before the body. Depending on the particular bill, one of four trees may be used: the first tree has room for three amendments, the second and third trees have room for five amendments, and the fourth tree has room for 11 (or 12 in rare instances) amendments. To fill the tree, none of the slots may be left available.

== Consequences ==
The majority leader must assess the risk in deciding to fill the tree. Some senators will reject a bill if they feel they have not been given an adequate opportunity to offer amendments. For example, Senator Susan Collins voted against the 2010 Defense Authorization Bill although she largely supported the substance of the bill, citing the filling of the amendment tree by Senate Majority Leader Harry Reid. Reid used this tactic during the Consolidated Appropriations Act, 2014 Senate floor debate, preventing amendments that would have removed the provisions that rolled back Section 716 (derivatives guarantees by the FDIC) of the Dodd-Frank legislation.

== See also ==
- Amendment
- Filibuster
- Veto
