= Reinvigorating Antibiotics and Diagnostic Innovation Act =

Reinvigorating Antibiotics and Diagnostic Innovation (READI) Act
- Long title: To amend the Internal Revenue Code of 1986 to allow a credit against tax for clinical testing expenses for qualified infectious disease drugs and rapid diagnostic tests.
- Announced in: the 115th United States Congress
- Sponsored by: Erik Paulsen (R-MN)
- Number of co-sponsors: 5

Legislative history
- Introduced in the House as H.R. 1840 by Erik Paulsen (R–MN) on March 30, 2017; Committee consideration by United States House Committee on Ways and Means

The Reinvigorating Antibiotics and Diagnostic Innovation (READI) Act (H.R. 1840) is a bipartisan bill introduced in the U.S. House of Representatives by Congressman Erik Paulsen (R-MN) and Congressman Mike Thompson (D-CA). The bill would give a tax credit to organizations that create new antibiotics and "rapid diagnostic tests" that treat serious or life-threatening infections.

According to Politico, "To encourage research and development, the bill would provide a new 50 percent tax credit for the clinical testing expenses of new antibiotics that treat serious or life-threatening infections and rapid infectious disease diagnostic tests."

According to the Infectious Diseases Society of America, the legislation's tax credit is modeled after the credit offered under the Orphan Drug Act for treatments of rare diseases.

Paulsen is co-chair of the Congressional Medical Technology Caucus.

== Background ==
Reports published by the Centers for Disease Control and Prevention (CDC) reports have shown that approximately two million people in the United States suffered from antibiotic-resistant bacteria every year. Around 23,000 people die from it each year in the U.S.

According to Paulsen, more people are getting infections that existing drugs cannot treat. As a result, patients often stay in the hospital for a long time and need expensive treatments.

== Legislative history ==
H.R. 1840 was introduced on March, 30, 2017 and referred to the House Ways and Means Committee.

It is possible that Paulsen and Thompson could try to attach the legislation to the FDA's user fee reauthorization bill, or to a larger tax reform bill.

== Support and opposition ==
The Infectious Disease Society of America and the chief of the Division of Infectious Diseases at San Francisco General Hospital support the bill.

== See also ==
- Antibiotics
- Antimicrobial resistance
