= Cannabis banking in Washington =

The cannabis industry in the U.S. state of Washington has been served by several banks and credit unions since Initiative 502 passed in 2012, legalizing production, distribution, retail sales and possession in the state.

== Banks and credit unions ==
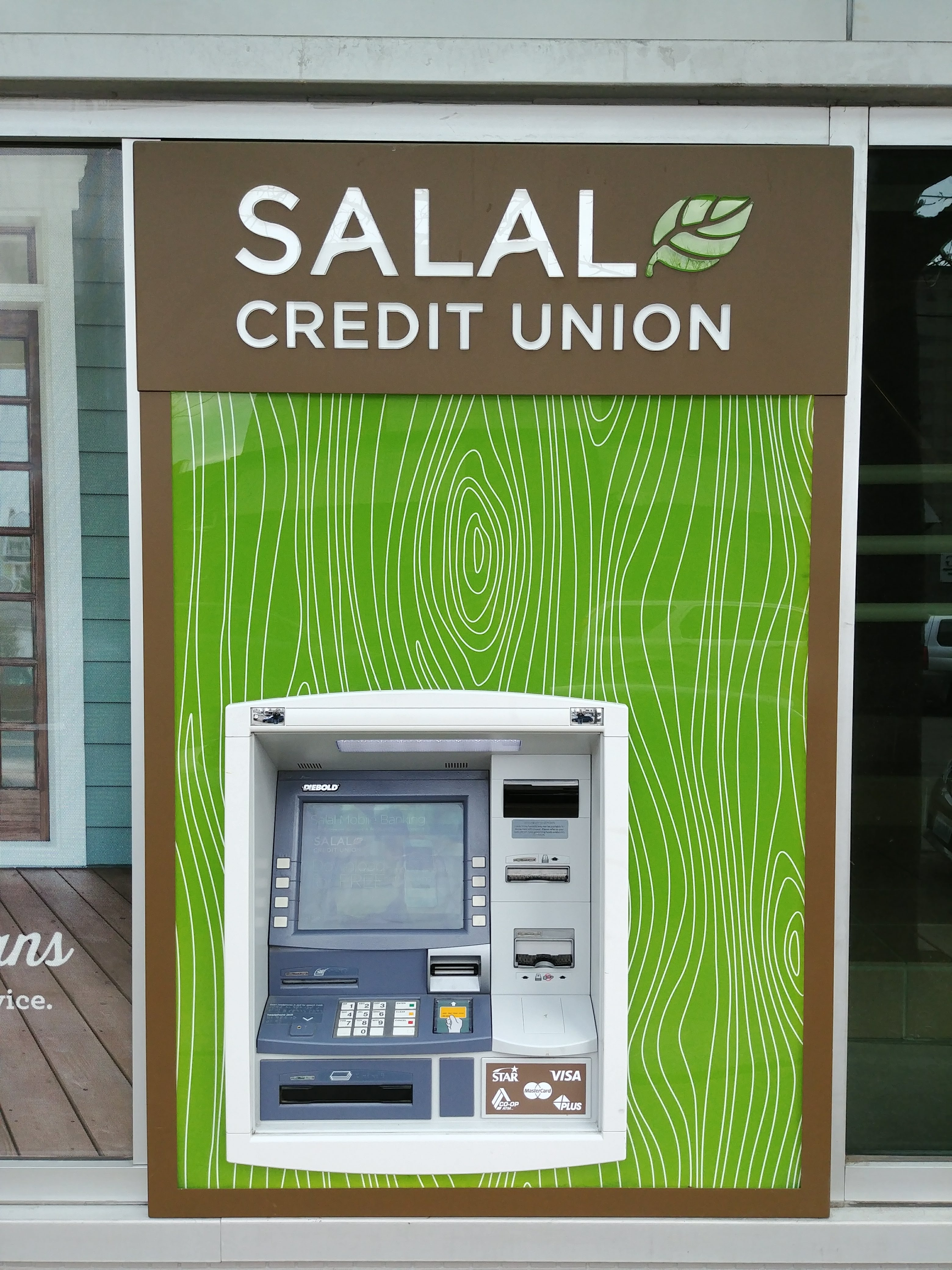
Salal Credit Union ATM

Three banks and Three credit unions – O Bee Credit Union in Tumwater since 2014, Numerica Credit Union in Spokane and Salal Credit Union in Seattle – handle most of the accounts. As of 2017, the state took in 95% of its cannabis tax revenue through banks (vice cash) and the Washington State Department of Revenue requires electronic funds transfer for tax payment, unless the taxpayer is unable to open a bank account.

== Federal regulation ==
Washington's governor and United States Senators have attempted to preserve U.S. Department of the Treasury FinCEN rules in place since 2014 allowing banks to do regulated transactions with the industry, despite conflicting laws on legality at the Federal level.

== Alternatives to banks ==
Some Washington cannabis business, particularly at point of sale, is conducted in cryptocurrency. Some use Square point-of-sale system, although it has also been reported that PayPal and Square will terminate accounts from cannabis-related businesses. A cashless transaction system was created by POSaBIT and used in Washington cannabis establishments c. 2017. It would convert US dollars from a customer's debit card swipe to cryptocurrency for expenditures made at the retail establishment.
