= Numerica Credit Union =

- Formerly: Spokane Railway Credit Union
- Type: Credit union
- Industry: Financial services
- Founded: 1937
- Headquarters: Spokane Valley, Washington, United States
- Area served: Eastern Washington and Northern Idaho
- Key people: Carla Cicero, President and CEO; Ron Hupp, Chair of Board of Directors
- Products: Savings; checking; consumer loans; mortgages; credit cards; online banking
- Total assets: $3.6B (June 2022)
- Members: 169K (June 2022)
- Website: www.numericacu.com

Numerica Credit Union (formerly Spokane Railway Credit Union) is a credit union founded in 1937. Numerica serves the Spokane, Tri-Cities, and Wenatchee Valley regions of Washington state, as well as the North Idaho Panhandle. It is regulated under the authority of the National Credit Union Administration (NCUA). As of June 2022, Numerica managed over $3.5 billion in assets and served more than 169,000 members. Numerica's headquarters are located in Spokane Valley, Washington.

== History ==
Older logo prior to their 2013 re-branding.

The credit union was founded in 1937 under the name Spokane Railway Credit Union. Initially, Numerica only served Spokane railway employees, but it expanded to serve other sectors of the transportation industry, and eventually opened its doors to all residents of Washington State and the Northern Idaho Panhandle.

== Awards ==
In 2021, Numerica was named the Best Place to Work in the Inland Northwest in the large business category by the Spokane Journal of Business. Numerica's SBA team was honored in 2020 as Outstanding Community Lender for the U.S. Small Business Administration’s Seattle District for closing the most standard SBA loans in a fiscal year.

Numerica also received the Crystal Performance Award in 2020 and 2021, an annual recognition of “industry standard-setting credit unions,” according to Raddon, the financial industry research and analysis arm of Fiserv. The credit union was selected based on an analysis of key performance metrics focused on service, member relationships, sales, and other areas as observed within the Performance Analytics program from Raddon.

== See also ==
- Cannabis banking in Washington (state)
