= Procedures of the United States Congress =

Established ways of doing legislative business

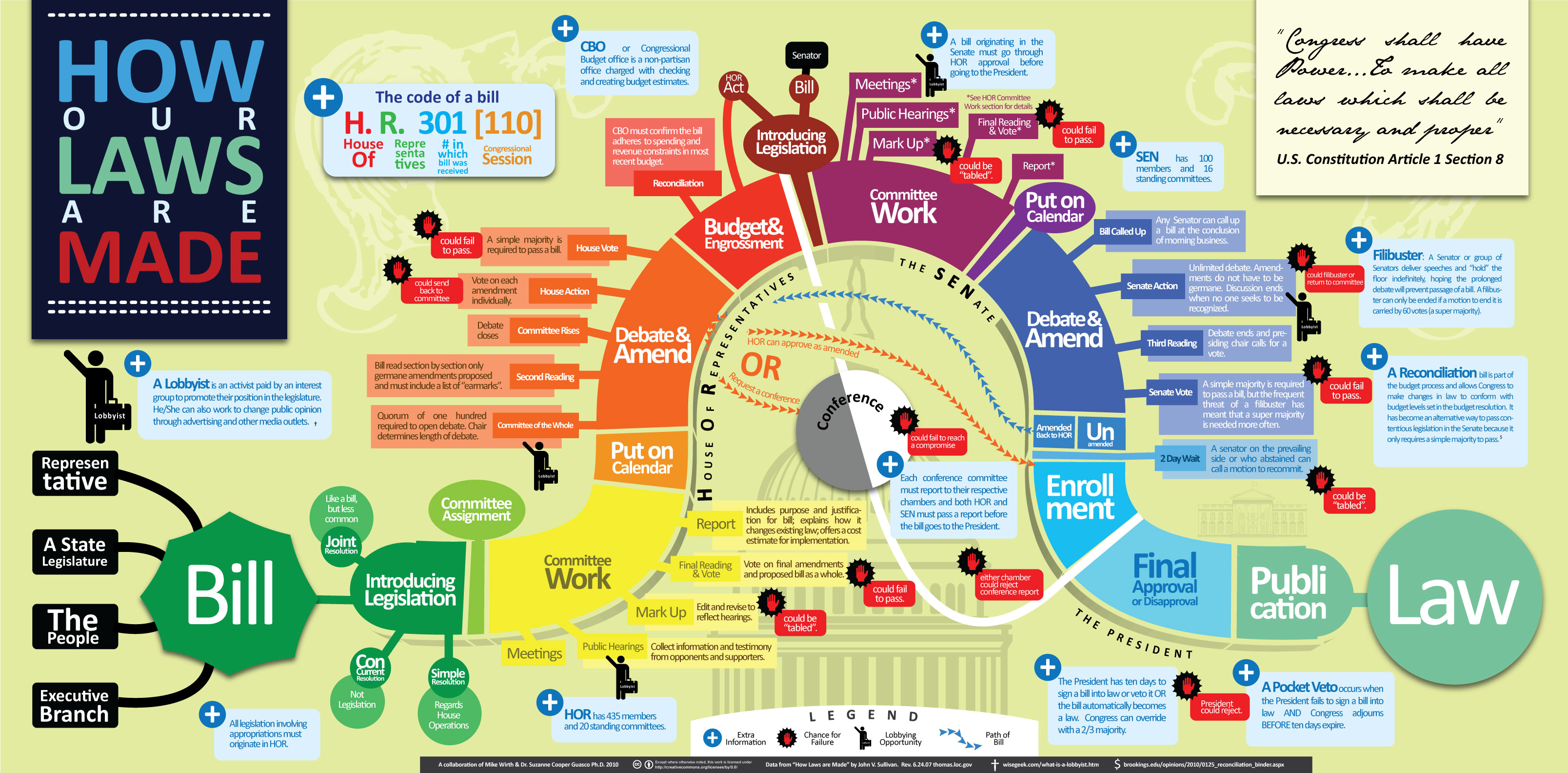
How U. S. federal legislation is made

Procedures of the United States Congress are established ways of doing legislative business. Congress has two-year terms with one session each year. There are rules and procedures, often complex and refined over many years, which guide how it operates -- and, especially, how it will convert ideas for legislation into laws.

== Sessions ==
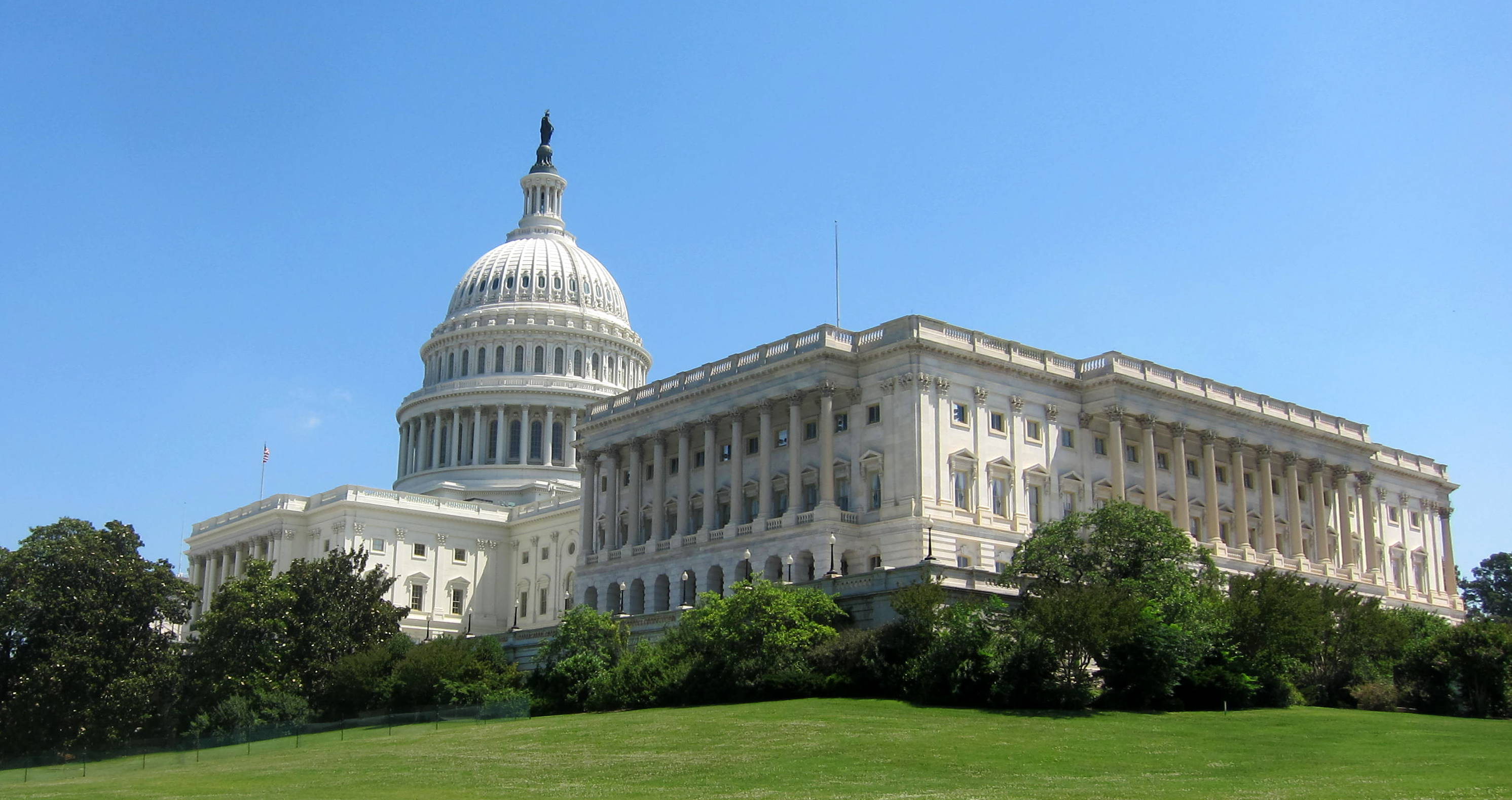
The southwest corner of the United States Capitol in Washington. The Constitution forbids Congress from meeting elsewhere.

A term of Congress is divided into two "sessions", one for each year. Congress has occasionally also been called into an extra or special session. The Constitution requires Congress to meet at least once each year. A new session commences each year on January 3, unless Congress chooses another date.

Before the Twentieth Amendment, Congress met from the first Monday in December, to April or May in the first session of their term (the "long session"); and from December to March 4 in the second "short session". The new Congress would then meet for some days, for the inauguration, swearing in new members, and organization.

The Constitution forbids either house from adjourning for more than three days, without the consent of the other house. The provision was intended to prevent one house from thwarting legislative business simply by refusing to meet.

To avoid obtaining consent during long recesses, the House or Senate may sometimes hold pro forma meetings, sometimes only minutes or even seconds long, every three days. The consent of both bodies is required for Congress's final adjournment, or adjournment sine die, at the end of each congressional session. If the two houses cannot agree on a date, the Constitution permits the President to settle the dispute.

== Joint sessions ==
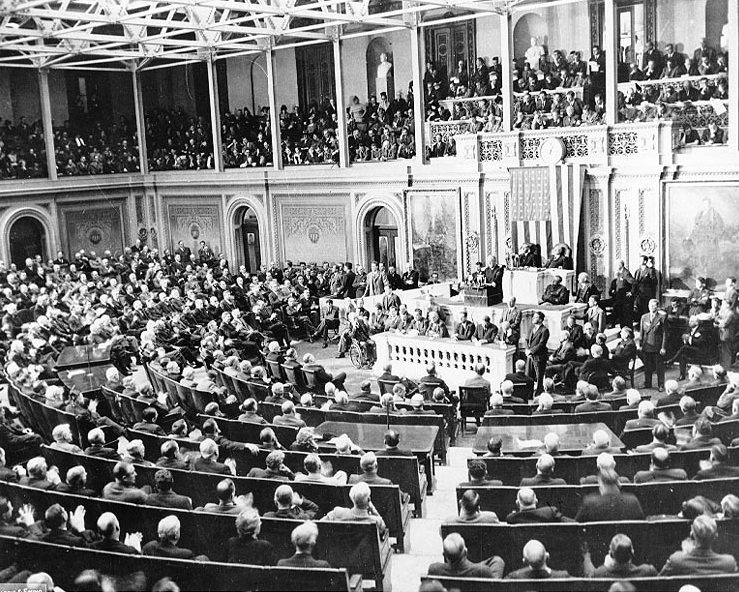
President Franklin Delano Roosevelt delivers his annual State of the Union speech to Congress in 1941. The annual speech is a custom re-established by President Woodrow Wilson.

Joint sessions of the United States Congress occur on special occasions that require a concurrent resolution from both House and Senate. These sessions include the counting of electoral votes following a Presidential election and the President's State of the Union address. Other meetings of both House and Senate are called Joint Meetings of Congress, held after unanimous consent agreements to recess and meet. Meetings of Congress for Presidential Inaugurations may also be Joint Sessions, if both House and Senate are in session at the time, otherwise they are formal joint gatherings.

At some time during the first two months of each session, the President customarily delivers the State of the Union Address, a speech in which he assesses the situation of the country and outlines his legislative proposals for the congressional session. The speech is modeled on the Speech from the Throne given by the British monarch, and is mandated by the Constitution of the United States—though it is not necessarily required to be delivered each year or in the customary manner.

Thomas Jefferson discontinued the original practice of delivering the speech in person before both houses of Congress, deeming it too monarchical. Instead, Jefferson and his successors sent a written message to Congress each year. In 1913, President Woodrow Wilson reestablished the practice of personally attending to deliver the speech. Few Presidents have deviated from this custom since.

Joint Sessions and Joint Meetings are traditionally presided over by the Speaker of the House. For the joint session to count electoral votes for President, the Constitution requires the President of the Senate (the Vice President of the United States) to preside.

== Bills and resolutions ==
Ideas for legislation and drafts of legislation come from many areas, including members of Congress, Congressional committees, constituents, lobbyists, state legislatures, the president, federal departments, and federal agencies. The House Office of the Legislative Counsel and Senate Office of the Legislative Counsel are staffed with experts in legislative drafting who are available to help members and committees of the house create, write, edit or amend proposed legislation.

In many cases, lobbyists propose or even write draft legislation and submit it to a member for review or for introduction into that member's house. Congressional lobbyists are legally required to be registered in a central database.

Drafting statutes is an art that requires "great skill, knowledge, and experience." Congressional committees sometimes draft bills after studies and hearings covering periods of a year or more.

Any member of Congress may introduce legislation at any time while the House is in session, by placing it in the hopper on the Clerk's desk. A sponsor's signature is required, and there can be many co-sponsors. It's assigned a number by the Clerk. The usual next step is for the proposal to be passed to a committee for review.

A proposal usually takes one of four principal forms: the bill, the joint resolution, the concurrent resolution, and the simple resolution.

- Bills are laws in the making. A House-originated bill begins with the letters "H.R." for "House of Representatives", followed by a number kept as it progresses. It is presented to the president after both Houses agree.
- Joint resolutions - There is little practical difference between a bill and a joint resolution since both are treated similarly; a joint resolution originating from the House, for example, begins "H.J.Res." followed by its number.
- Concurrent resolutions affect only the House and Senate, and accordingly are not presented to the president for approval later. In the House, it begins with "H.Con.Res."
- Simple resolutions concern only the House or only the Senate and begin with "H.Res." or "S.Res." respectively

Most legislative proposals are introduced as bills, but some are introduced as joint resolutions. There is little practical difference between the two, except that joint resolutions may include preambles but bills may not. Joint resolutions are the normal method used to propose a constitutional amendment or to declare war. Concurrent resolutions (passed by both houses) and simple resolutions (passed by only one house) do not have the force of law. Instead, they serve to express the opinion of Congress, or to regulate procedure.

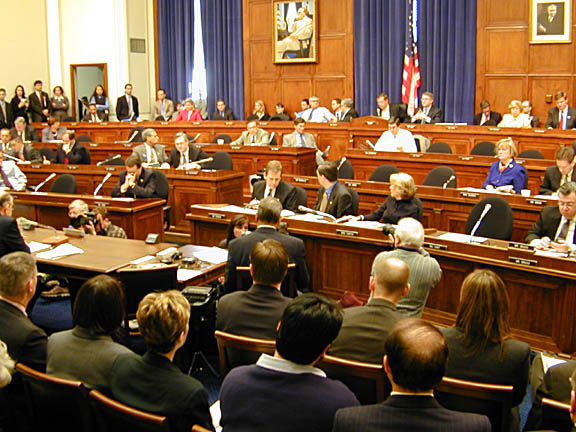
House Financial Services committee members sit in the tiers of raised chairs, while those testifying and audience members sit below.

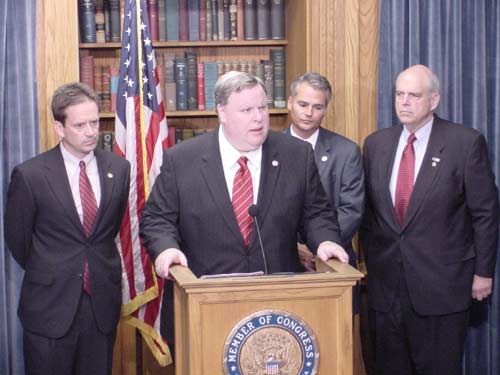
House representatives at a press conference announcing H.R. 3004 in 2005.

Here is the draft of a bill called the Coinage Act of 1873 passed by the House of Representatives ready to be considered by the Senate in 1873. The wording of the final statute is most likely different from this one.

== How bills become laws ==
Bills may be introduced by any member of either house. However, the Constitution provides that: "All bills for raising Revenue shall originate in the House of Representatives." As a result, the Senate does not have the power to initiate bills imposing taxes. Furthermore, the House of Representatives holds that the Senate does not have the power to originate appropriation bills, or bills authorizing the expenditure of federal funds.

Historically, the Senate has disputed the interpretation advocated by the House. However, whenever the Senate originates an appropriations bill, the House simply refuses to consider it, thereby settling the dispute in practice. While the Senate cannot originate revenue and appropriation bills, it retains the power to amend or reject them. A congressional act in 1974 established procedures to try to establish appropriate annual spending levels.

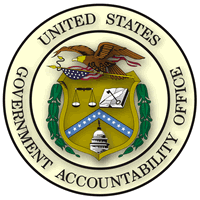
The Government Accountability Office is an important information-gathering agency for Congress.

Each bill goes through several stages in each house. The first stage involves consideration by a committee, which often seeks input from relevant departments as well as requests feedback from the Government Accountability Office. Most legislation is considered by standing committees, each of which has jurisdiction over a particular subject matter, such as Agriculture or Appropriations. The House has twenty standing committees. The Senate has sixteen. Standing committees meet at least once each month.

Almost all standing committee meetings for transacting business must be open to the public unless the committee votes, publicly, to close the meeting. Open committee meetings may be covered by the media. In some cases, bills may be sent to select committees, which tend to have more narrow jurisdictions than standing committees. If a bill is important, the committee may set a date for public hearings announced by the committee's chairman. Each standing and select committee is led by a chair (who belongs to the majority party) and a ranking member, who belongs to the minority party.

Witnesses and experts can present their case for or against a bill. Sometimes transcripts of these meetings are made public. Then, a bill may go to what's called a mark-up session where committee members debate the bill's merits and may offer amendments or revisions. Committees are permitted to hold hearings and collect evidence when considering bills. They may also amend the bill, but the full house holds the power to accept or reject committee amendments.

After considering and debating a measure, the committee votes on whether it wishes to report the measure to the full house. Not reporting a bill or tabling it means it has been rejected. If amendments to a bill are extensive, then sometimes a new bill with all the amendments built in will be written, sometimes known as a clean bill with a new number.

Both houses provide for procedures under which the committee can be bypassed or overruled, but they are rarely used. If reported by the committee, the bill reaches the floor of the full house which considers it. This can be simple or complex. Consideration of a bill requires a rule, which is a simple resolution hammering out the particulars of debate–time limits, possibility of further amendments, and such. Each side has equal time and members can yield to other members who wish to speak. Sometimes opponents seek to recommit a bill which means to change part of it. Generally, discussion requires a quorum, usually half of the total number of representatives, before discussion can begin, although there are exceptions.

The house may debate and amend the bill. The precise procedures used by the House of Representatives and the Senate differ. A final vote on the bill follows.

Once a bill is approved by one house, it is sent to the other, which may pass, reject, or amend it. For the bill to become law, both houses must agree to identical versions of the bill. If the second house amends the bill, then the differences between the two versions must be reconciled in a conference committee, an ad hoc committee that includes both senators and representatives. One mechanism Congress uses to work within revenue constraints is called the reconciliation process, which is a multiple step way to keep new budgets within the bounds of existing ones. In addition, both Houses use a budget enforcement mechanism informally known as pay-as-you-go or paygo, which discourages members from considering acts which increase budget deficits.

In many cases, conference committees have introduced substantial changes to bills and added unrequested spending, significantly departing from both the House and Senate versions. President Ronald Reagan once quipped, "If an orange and an apple went into conference consultations, it might come out a pear." If both houses agree to the version reported by the conference committee, the bill passes; otherwise, it fails.

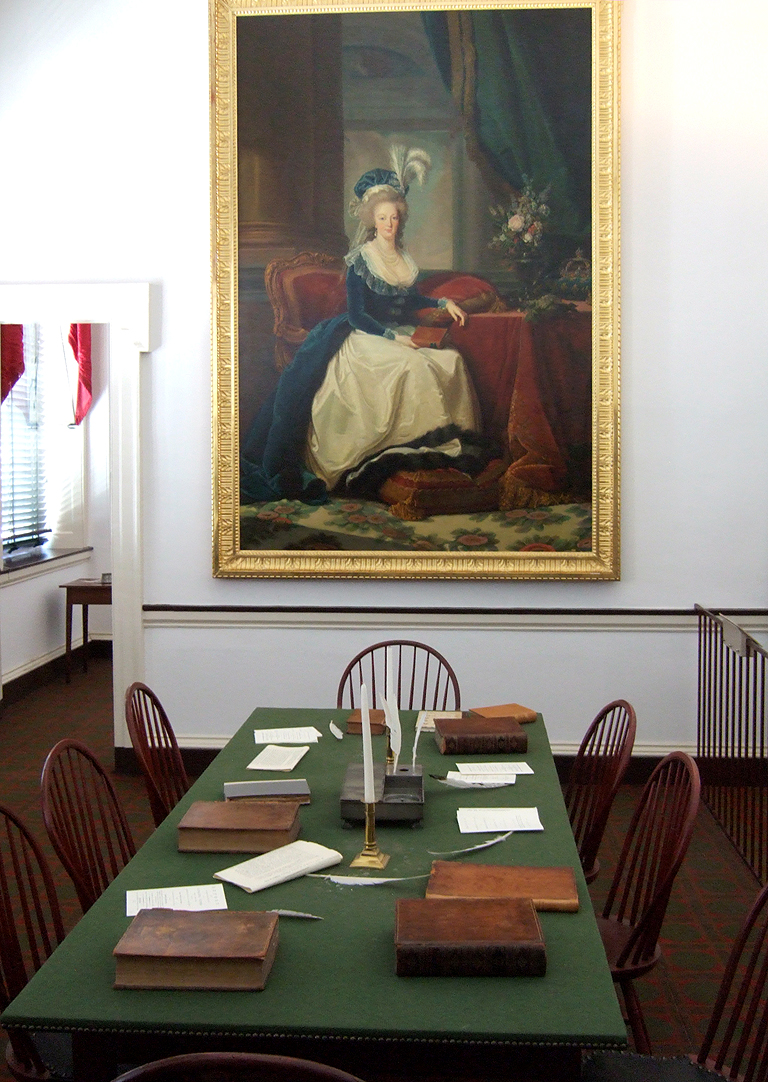
This second floor committee room in Congress Hall in Philadelphia has a portrait of Marie Antoinette, which was presented as a gift from the French monarch following the American Revolution.

There are a variety of means for members to vote on bills, including systems using lights and bells and electronic voting. Most votes, including quorum votes, are done electronically, and allow members to vote "yea" or "nay" or "present". They light up when the vote is in process. Members insert a voting ID card, and can change their votes during the last five minutes if they choose. Paper ballots are used on some occasions. Yea is indicated by the color green, nay is indicated by red.

To conduct a voice vote, the chairman asks "As many as are in favor say Aye, as many as are opposed, say No". Rules permit live media coverage of voting, but prohibit use of these broadcasts for political purposes or political advertisements. House rules require a three-fifths vote to pass a ruling that contains a specified federal income tax rate increase. One member cannot cast a vote for another member. It is possible for citizens to learn how congresspersons voted by consulting an online database.

After passage by both houses, a bill is considered to be enrolled and is sent to the president for approval. The president may sign the bill and make it law. The President may also choose to veto the bill, returning it to Congress with his objections. In such a case, the bill only becomes law if each house of Congress votes to override the veto with a two-thirds majority.

The president may choose to take no action, neither signing or vetoing the bill. In such a case, the Constitution states that the bill automatically becomes law after ten days, excluding Sundays, unless Congress is adjourned during this period. Therefore, the president may veto legislation passed at the end of a congressional session simply by ignoring it. The maneuver is known as a pocket veto, and cannot be overridden by the adjourned Congress.

Every Act of Congress or joint resolution begins with an enacting formula or resolving formula stipulated by law. These are:

- Act of Congress: "Be it enacted by the Senate and House of Representatives of the United States of America in Congress assembled."
- Joint resolution: "Resolved by the Senate and House of Representatives of the United States of America in Congress assembled."

== Quorum and vote ==
The Constitution specifies that a majority of members constitutes a quorum to do business in each house. The rules of each house provide that a quorum is assumed to be present unless a quorum call demonstrates the contrary. Representatives and senators rarely force the presence of a quorum by demanding quorum calls; thus, in most cases, debates continue even if a majority is not present.

Both houses use voice voting to decide most matters. Members shout out "aye!" or "no!", and the presiding officer announces the result. The Constitution requires a recorded vote on the demand of one-fifth of the members present. If the result of the voice vote is unclear, or if the matter is controversial, a recorded vote usually ensues.

The Senate uses roll-call votes. A clerk calls out the names of all the senators, each senator stating "aye" or "no" when his or her name is announced. The House reserves roll-call votes for the election of the Speaker, as a roll-call of all 435 representatives takes quite some time. Normally, members vote by electronic device. In the case of a tie, the motion in question fails. In the Senate, the Vice President may, if present, cast the tiebreaking vote.

A series of many votes in a row is known as vote-a-rama. This is most commonly a series of amendments on a budget resolution or a bill in the reconciliation process, but may be done on any bill.
