= House Resolution 1227 =

House Resolution 1227, "Ending Federal Marijuana Prohibition Act of 2017", is a U.S. United States House resolution introduced during the 115th Congress. It would remove cannabis from the Controlled Substances Act Schedule I, and eliminate Federal restrictions on cannabis possession and sale, other than interstate transfers. It was initially sponsored by Thomas Garrett Jr., a Virginia Republican, and cosponsored by Scott Taylor, also a Virginia Republican, and Tulsi Gabbard, a Hawaii Democrat. It is reintroduced legislation from 2015, when it was known as S. 2237. Other Representatives who joined as cosponsors included Justin Amash, a Michigan Republican. On April 20, 2017, activists from D.C. Cannabis Campaign distributed 1,227 joints made from 1 pound (0.45 kg) of cannabis to members of congress to urge consideration of the bill.
