= DNA Specimen Provenance Assignment =

DNA Specimen Provenance Assignment (DSPA) also known as DNA Specimen Provenance Assay, is a molecular diagnostic test used to definitively assign biopsy specimen identity and establish specimen purity during the diagnostic testing cycle for cancer and other histopathological conditions. The term first appeared in the 2011 scientific paper, “The Changing Spectrum of DNA-Based Specimen Provenance Testing in Surgical Pathology,” published in the American Journal of Clinical Pathology, which built upon concepts described in an earlier paper published in the Journal of Urology.

== Testing description ==
A panel of 16 microsatellite short tandem repeat (STR) markers that recognizes highly variable loci of human DNA is used in a PCR-based assay and analyzed by capillary electrophoresis. The 16 STR loci range from approximately 75 to 400 base pairs in length, and are highly polymorphic in the human population. The collective data from this panel provides a genetic profile, or ‘DNA fingerprint,’ representing the individual. To complete the diagnostic testing cycle for cancer, the genetic profile from the putative malignant specimen(s) is compared with the genetic profile derived from the patient’s DNA reference sample taken via cheek swab at the time of the biopsy procedure.

== Indications ==
Conventional histopathology is inherently subject to a certain degree of ambiguity due to the possibility of Specimen Provenance Complications (SPCs) resulting from instances of specimen transposition, extraneous/foreign cell contamination or misidentification of cells used in clinical or anatomical pathology. These types of errors are considered the most rapidly growing category of malpractice claims involving pathologists, and most claims involve a specimen switch between patients. In terms of frequency of occurrence, a 2013 study published in the American Journal of Clinical Pathology indicates that 0.93% of biopsies could be subject to an SPC. Furthermore, each case involves at least two individuals, so this error rate actually underestimates the percentage of patients potentially impacted by incidents of biopsy misidentification.

If left undetected, SPCs can compromise diagnostic accuracy and patient safety, potentially leading to adverse results such as treatment when no malignancy is present or delayed intervention for an advancing cancer. A study published in the Journal of Urology in 2014 concluded that more than 1 in every 200 prostate biopsy patients is misdiagnosed due to undetected specimen provenance complications. Additionally, in a study published in the American Journal of Clinical Pathology in 2015, the researchers at Washington University’s School of Medicine Genomics and Pathology Services center in St Louis, MO, determined that 2% of tissue samples received in their lab for next generation sequencing were contaminated by another person’s DNA to an extent to be clinically significant (i.e. greater than 5% of the sample was contaminated).

DNA Specimen Provenance Assay (Assignment) (DSPA) testing provides a solution to the problem of SPCs by confirming the identity and purity of patients’ biopsy samples so the most appropriate course of action can be taken. It is particularly useful when laboratory findings are unexpected or discordant with the clinical findings, when treatment options include radical surgical, radiological or chemical therapies, or delayed detection can have a significant negative impact on patient outcomes.

== Availability ==
DNA Specimen Provenance Assay (Assignment) (DSPA) testing can be performed on specimens from a range of medical specialty areas, such as gastroenterology, obstetrics, pulmonology, radiology, urology, etc. Molecular methods are currently available to extract DNA from a variety of sources, including fresh tissue, formalin-fixed, paraffin-embedded tissue and cytology specimens/slides. A combination of DSPA with conventional histopathology increases the diagnostic sensitivity and accuracy of patients’ biopsy results. Strand Diagnostics manufactures the know error system, a biopsy collection system that incorporate the DSPA test as part of the standard biopsy evaluation process.

== Coding ==
In 2012, the American Medical Association recognized the growing adoption of DSPA testing as physicians' standard of care by creating two new "Tier 1" molecular diagnostics CPT(R) codes as follows: 81265 Comparative analysis using Short Tandem Repeat (STR) markers; patient and comparative specimen, and 81266 Comparative analysis using Short Tandem Repeat (STR) markers; each additional specimen.
