= Small business financing =

Investment strategy

Small business financing (also referred to as startup financing - especially when referring to an investment in a startup company - or franchise financing) refers to the means by which an aspiring or current business owner obtains money to start a new small business, purchase an existing small business or bring money into an existing small business to finance current or future business activity.

There are many ways to finance a new or existing business, each of which features its own benefits and limitations.

== History ==
After the 2008 financial crisis, the availability of traditional types of small business financing dramatically decreased. At the same time, alternative types of small business financing emerged. In this context, it is instructive to divide the types of small business financing into the two broad categories of traditional and alternative small business financing options.

== Traditional small business financing options ==
There have traditionally been two options available to aspiring or existing entrepreneurs looking to finance their small business or franchise: borrow funds (debt financing) or sell ownership interests in exchange for capital (equity financing).

=== Debt financing ===
The principal advantages of borrowing funds to finance a new or existing small business are typically that the lender will not have any say in how the business is managed and will not be entitled to any of the profits that the business generates. The disadvantages are the payments may be especially burdensome for businesses that are new or expanding.

- Failure to make required loan payments will risk forfeiture of assets (including possibly personal assets of the business owners) that are pledged as security for the loan.
- The credit approval process may result in some aspiring or existing business owners not qualifying for financing or only qualifying for high interest loans or loans that require the pledge of personal assets as collateral. In addition, the time required to obtain credit approval may be significant.
- Excessive debt may overwhelm the business and ultimately risks bankruptcy. For example, a business that carries a heavy debt burden may face an increased risk of failure.

The sources of debt financing may include conventional lenders (banks, credit unions, etc.), friends and family, Small Business Administration (SBA) loans, technology based lenders, microlenders, home equity loans and personal credit cards. Small business owners in the US borrow, on average, $23,000 from friends and family to start their business.

The duration of a business loan is variable and could range from one week to five or more years, and speed of access to funds will depend on the lender's internal processes. Private lenders are swift in turnaround times and can in many cases settle funds on the same day as the application, whereas traditional big banks can take weeks or months.

=== Government sources of small business loans ===
Various national governments encourage the development of small business within their countries.

==== South Africa ====
- NYDA (National Youth Development Agency)
- The DTI (Department of Trade & Industry South Africa)
- SEDA - Small Enterprise Development Agency (South Africa)
- SEFA - Small Enterprise Finance Agency (South Africa)
- MICTSETA - Media Information and Communication Technologies Sector Education and Training Authority (South Africa)
- IDC – Industrial Development Corporation (South Africa)

==== United States ====
- Small Business Administration

=== Equity financing ===
The principal practical advantage of selling an ownership interest to finance a new or existing small business is that the business may use the equity investment to run the business rather than making potentially burdensome loan payments. In addition, the business and the business owner(s) will typically not have to repay the investors in the event that the business loses money or ultimately fails. The disadvantages of equity financing include the following:

- By selling an ownership interest, the entrepreneur will dilute his or her control over the business.
- The investors are entitled to a share of the business profits.
- The investors must be informed of significant business events and the entrepreneur must act in the best interests of the investors.
- In certain circumstances, equity financing may require compliance with federal and state securities laws.

The sources of equity financing may include friends and family, angel investors, and venture capitalists.

== Rollover retirement funds to start or finance a business ==
In the United States, a lesser-known but well-established means for entrepreneurs to finance a new or existing business is to rollover their 401k, IRA or other retirement funds into their franchise or other business venture. This financing option is often called "rollover as business startup" or "ROBS" financing. This isn't a loan, instead, the business owner forms a C Corporation, which sponsors a profit-sharing retirement plan. From there, the business owner uses that company retirement plan to buy shares of his own company, thus contributing to the company's finances.

This small business financing option allows the business owner to obtain the benefits of debt and equity financing while avoiding the disadvantages such as burdensome debt payments. More than 10,000 entrepreneurs have used their retirement funds to finance their start-up businesses.

The IRS has clearly stated that the use of retirement funds to finance a small business is not “per se” non-compliant. ROBS financing is complicated, however, and the IRS has developed a set of guidelines for ROBS financing. As such it is essential to employ experienced professionals to assist with this small business financing strategy.

== New sources of debt and equity financing ==
In the wake of the decline of traditional small business financing, new sources of debt and equity financing have increased including Crowdfunding and Peer-to-peer lending. Unless small businesses have collateral and can prove revenue, banks are hesitant to lend money. Oftentimes, start-up companies and businesses operating for less than a year do not have collateral and private money lenders or angel investors are a better option. Private money lenders and angel investors are willing to take more risk than banks recognizing the potential upside. Private lenders can also reach a decision faster with approvals only going through one tier rather than being overlooked by many levels of management.

== Alternative debt financing ==
Stepping into the gap between personal finance and traditional small business financing, there has been an increase in the number of alternative lenders who provide debt finance to small businesses. These lenders use alternative means of "security", and advanced algorithms to offer niche lending products that are designed for specific situations.

=== Unsecured loan ===
Unsecured loans are issued and priced using alternative data sources. The majority of the lending decision happens off the back of transaction history and requires no formal collateral or security.

Different lenders use different data points to make their decisions. These can include things like:

- Transaction history,
- Business directors' credit history,
- Trade references,
- Social media activity and following,
- eCommerce transaction history,
- Website analytics,
- Current monthly debt obligations, among others.

Due to the increased risk involved for lenders in an unsecured loan, these products are generally more expensive than a traditional business loan which is backed by collateral.

=== Merchant cash advance ===
Merchant cash advances (MCA's) are issued based on card transaction history that happens through a point of sale (POS) device, like a credit card machine. For this reason, MCA's are products mainly issued in the Retail sector, where POS devices are prevalent.

MCA's have a unique payback mechanism, where there is no fixed term of payback. The borrower pays back a portion of their income per month, or week, depending on the terms of their loan. When the borrower earns more revenue, they pay back more of their loan. When they earn less revenue, they pay back a smaller amount of their loan.

=== Invoice discounting ===
Invoice discounting uses an invoice issued by a reputable supplier as a form of security. Because large corporate companies are unlikely to disappear overnight, the debt which they owe the borrower can be drawn down against by a borrower.

The mechanics of an invoice discounting product work as follows:

- The borrower has a 60-day payment term with a large corporation that owes them money for goods supplied.
- The borrower needs positive cash flow through their business.
- The borrower approaches an invoice discounting lender who then "buys" this invoice from them.
- The lender pays a large portion of the invoice to the borrower almost immediately.
- The lender normally charges a fee according to how long the borrower needs the facility for.
- When the large corporate pays the invoice, the lender is repaid in full and has earned "interest" on the loan product.

=== Equipment/asset finance ===
Equipment and/or asset finance products use the piece of machinery or equipment being bought as collateral. Because there is inherent value in that machinery, they can always reclaim it as an asset if the borrower defaults on their loan.

Equipment finance is often referred to as a "lease to own" product.

=== Purchase order and contract finance ===
The term "purchase order" is often used to describe the tender process in South Africa. Purchase order finance is designed specifically for a situation where a government organization or large corporation has issued a contract to a borrower, and the borrower needs finance to execute the contract.

In the US and Canada, this is referred to as contract finance or government contract finance. The mechanism of security and distribution is the same.

In order to qualify for this type of finance, it is required that the borrower has a signed and won contract from the contract issuer.

== Business finance marketplaces ==
To help small business owners make a decision on what types of small business loans are best for their business and needs, business finance marketplaces have established themselves as an intermediary or facilitator.

The process generally works as follows:

1. The business owner applies through the marketplace.
2. The marketplace has relationships with the majority of small business lenders in their region.
3. The marketplace understands the lending appetite of the various lenders and prequalifies the applicant.
4. The marketplace sends the final details of the applicant to the lender, based on the applicant's choice.
5. The lender and the applicant finalize the details of the loan.
