= Drone Federalism Act of 2017 =

The Drone Federalism Act of 2017 is a bill introduced in the 115th Congress by U.S. Senators Tom Cotton (R-AR), Dianne Feinstein (D-CA), Mike Lee (R-UT), and Richard Blumenthal (D-CT) on May 25, 2017. The bill would "affirm state regulatory authority regarding the operation of unmanned aerial systems (UAS), or drones."

The bill would create a process by which the federal government would work with state and local governments to manage the use of both recreational and commercial drones. Essentially, the bill would let local municipalities choose how "hobbyists" (non-business operators of drones) can use their drones, as long as the use was below an altitude of 200 feet.

While the bill shifts the regulatory authority from the FAA to local governments, it would still preserve the FAA's right to preemption as limited to only "the extent necessary to ensure the safety and efficiency of the national airspace system for interstate commerce."

"The senators are pitching the Drone Federalism Act as a way for local governments, including Native American tribal authorities, to create drone rules specific to their regions without butting heads with the federal government," according to Fortune magazine.

The National Governors Association supports the legislation.

== Legislative background ==
According to the Federal Aviation Administration, around four million drones are expected to be in use by the year 2020. The FAA has already registered more than 750,000 drone operators and 200,000-manned aircraft operators in the United States.

A week before the bill was introduced, a federal appeals court ruled that the FAA lacks the authority to regulate drone use by hobbyists. The court ruling makes it so that hobbyists no longer have to register their drones in a national database. The FAA previously required registration before the court ruling.

According to Fortune magazine, "The FAA can still regulate how businesses use drones for purposes like inspecting oil rigs, but it cannot oversee "model aircraft," according to the 2012 FAA Modernization and Reform Act and affirmed by Washington, D.C appeals court judges. The 2012 bill lumped drones used by hobbyists into the category of "model aircraft."

Over the past several years, states and local municipalities have created their own laws and regulations for the use of drones. Many of these governments believed that the FAA's rules regarding drone use for hobbyists "failed to account for issues relating to privacy and trespassing, as in the case of someone flying a drone over another person’s house and taking photos."

135 local governments in 31 states have enacted their own drone rules.

== Legislative details ==
The Drone Federalism Act is designed to limit the scope of "the FAA’s preemption for drone regulations and protect states’ rights to enact drone laws."

Feinstein’s proposal would reserve state authority to "issue reasonable restrictions on the time, manner, and place of operation of a civil unmanned aircraft system that is operated below 200 feet above ground level or within 200 feet of a structure," and further defines "reasonable restrictions" to include: limits on speed; prohibitions on flight near any public or private property; restrictions on operations during certain times of day or week, or special occasions; and other "prohibitions that protect public safety, personal privacy, or property rights, or that manage land use or restrict noise pollution."

If passed, the bill would:

- Recognizes the FAA’s general authority over the nation’s airspace. It would make sure that state and local governments have the right to issue reasonable restrictions on the time and areas of operations for drone use.
- "Reaffirms that the federal government will respect private property rights to the airspace immediately above a person’s property, which includes the first 200 feet."
- Promote cooperation between various levels of government.
- Protect the legitimate interests of state, local, and tribal governments, including:
  - protecting public safety
  - protecting personal privacy
  - protecting property rights
  - managing land use
  - restricting nuisances and noise pollution

== Legislative history ==
The bill was introduced in the Senate on May 25, 2017. As of May 30, 2017, the bill has a total of 1 sponsor and 3 original cosponsors. It did not become law.

It was reintroduced in February 2021 by Senator Mike Lee of Utah. It has been shelved for the time being. The Drone Service Providers Alliance (DSPA) predict that Senator Mike Lee will make another attempt to pass this bill in the near future.

== See also ==
- Drone
- Miniature UAV
