= Merchant cash advance =

Type of business funding or loan

A merchant cash advance (MCA) is a type of business funding in which the funder is paid by taking a percentage of the businesses' revenues or sale proceeds. The term Merchant Cash Advance is commonly used to describe a variety of small business financing options characterized by purchasing future sales revenue in exchange for short payment terms (generally under 24 months) and small regular payments (typically paid each business day) as opposed to the larger monthly payments and longer payment terms associated with traditional bank loans.

== History ==
The merchant cash advance was originally structured as a lump sum payment to a business in exchange for an agreed-upon percentage of future credit card and/or debit card sales.

== Concept ==
Merchant cash advance companies provide funds to businesses in exchange for a percentage of the businesses' daily credit card income, directly from the processor that clears and settles the credit card payment. A company's remittances are drawn from customers' debit and credit-card purchases on a daily basis until the obligation has been met. Most providers form partnerships with payment processors and then take a fixed or variable percentage of a merchant's future credit card sales.

These merchant cash advances are not loans – rather, they are a sale of a portion of future credit and/or debit card sales. Therefore, merchant cash advance transactions are not subject to state usury laws that limit lenders from charging high-interest rates. Critics argue that, as a consequence, they operate in a largely unregulated market and charge much higher rates than banks. On 10 June 2016, a New York Supreme Court judge presiding over a published merchant cash advance case ruled that "if the transaction is not a loan, there can be no usury," adding also that asking the court to convert an agreement to sell future receivables into a loan agreement "would require unwarranted speculation."

This structure may have some advantages over the structure of a conventional loan. Payments to the merchant cash advance company fluctuate directly with the merchant's sales volumes, giving the merchant greater flexibility with which to manage their cash flow, particularly during a slow season. Advances are processed quicker than a typical loan, giving borrowers quicker access to capital. Also, because MCA providers typically give more weight to the underlying performance of a business than the owner's personal credit scores, merchant cash advances offer an alternative to businesses who may not qualify for a conventional loan. An example transaction is as follows: A business sells $25,000 of a portion of its future credit card sales for an immediate $20,000 lump sum payment from a finance company. The finance company then collects its portion (generally 15-35%) from every credit card and/or debit card sale until the entire $25,000 is collected.

== Usage ==
As of 2009, merchant cash advances are most often used by retail businesses that do not qualify for regular bank loans and are generally more expensive than bank loans.

Small businesses take out loans and cash advances when they believe that the opportunities offered by expanded financial assets will outweigh the costs. Small businesses that don't have the cash on hand to fund an expansion by themselves could rely on external funding, such as a merchant cash advance.
