= Commercial and industrial loan =

A commercial and industrial loan (C&I loan) is a loan to a business rather than a loan to an individual consumer. These short-term loans may have an interest rate based on the SOFR rate or prime rate and are secured by collateral owned by the business requesting the loan. C&I loans consist of revolving lines of credit, term loans, and owner-occupied real estate. C&I loans do not consist of investment real estate loans, which are typically handled by a different lending group at a bank.

According to SMB Adviser, the main purpose of a C&I loan is to finance capital expenditures or provide working capital to the borrower. A C&I loan is generally a short-term (1-2 year) line of credit or term loan, secured by collateral and cash flow owned by the business requesting the loan.

== Availability ==
Debt service coverage requirements for a term or amortizing loan is generally 1.1:1, and is defined as principal payments, plus interest expense, throughout one fiscal year analyzed on a 12-month trailing basis. Commercial loans are available in 48 states. They are:

1. Multi-Family Commercial Loan Programs
2. Mixed-Use Commercial Loan Programs
3. Office Commercial Loans.
4. Retail Spaces and Strip shopping malls
5. Industrial Commercial Building
6. NON-QM Loans
