= GAPA =

- Gay Asian Pacific Alliance
- Genocide and Atrocities Prevention Act
- Ground-to-Air Pilotless Aircraft
