= 115th United States Congress =

2017–2019 U.S. legislative term

| ← | 114th | 116th | → |
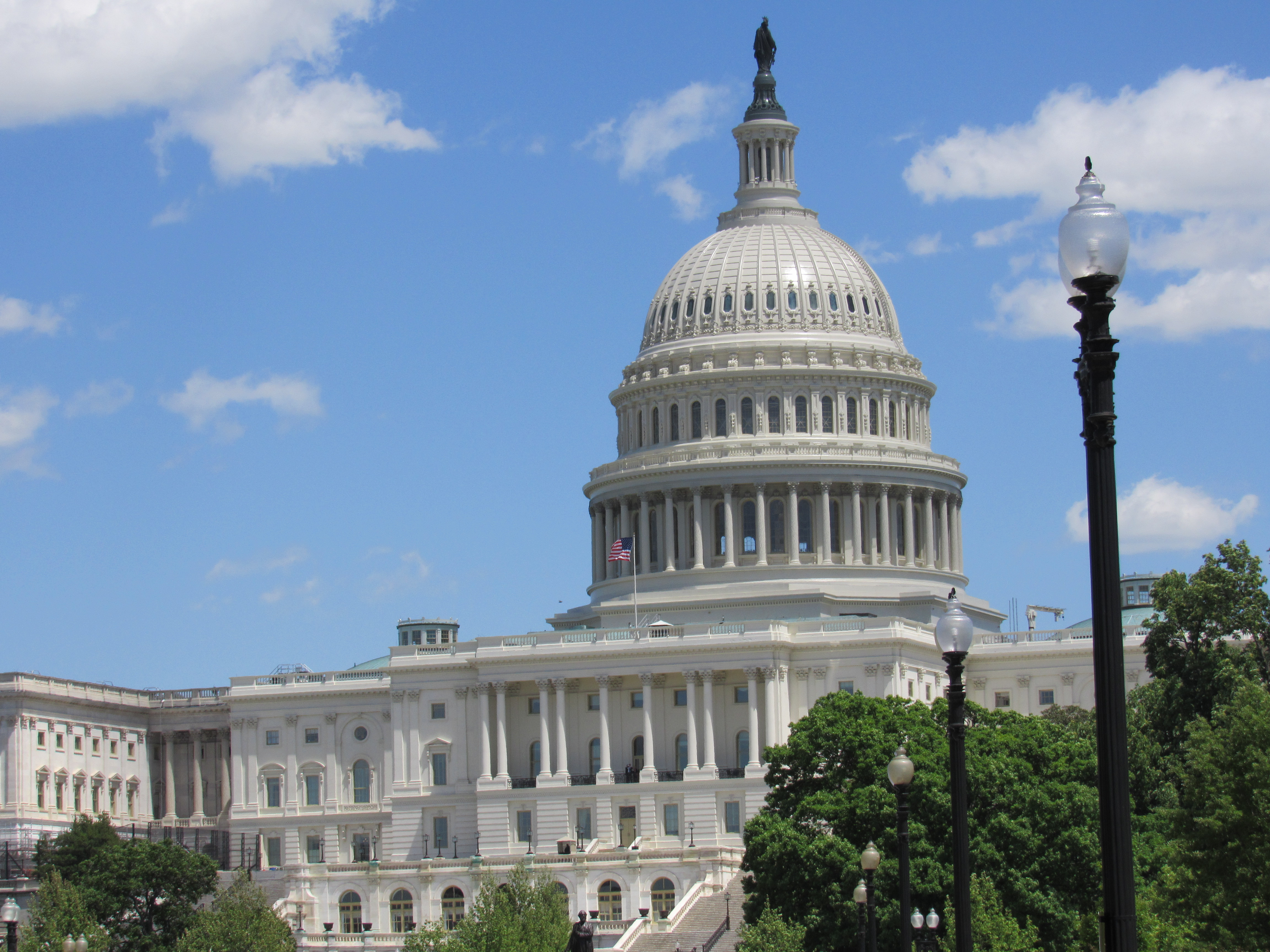
- United States Capitol (2017)

Overview
- Legislative body: United States Congress
- Jurisdiction: United States
- Term: January 3, 2017 – January 3, 2019

Senate
- Members: 100
- President: Joe Biden (D) (Note: U.S. Vice President Joe Biden's term as President of the Senate ended at noon on January 20, 2017, when Mike Pence's term began.) (until January 20, 2017); Mike Pence (R) (from January 20, 2017)
- President pro tempore: Orrin Hatch (R)
- Party control: Republican

House of Representatives
- Members: 435 representatives 6 non-voting delegates
- Speaker: Paul Ryan (R)
- Party control: Republican

Sessions
- 1st: January 3, 2017 – January 3, 2018
- 2nd: January 3, 2018 – January 3, 2019

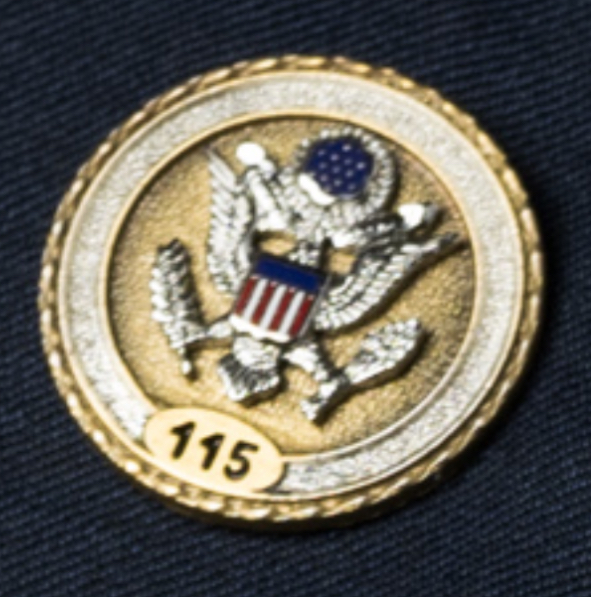
House of Representatives member pin for the 115th U.S. Congress

Congressional Record

Volume 163 (2017)

Volume 164 (2018)

The 115th United States Congress was a meeting of the legislative branch of the United States of America federal government, composed of the Senate and the House of Representatives. It met in Washington, D.C., from January 3, 2017, to January 3, 2019, during the final weeks of Barack Obama's presidency and the first two years of Donald Trump's first presidency. The seats in the House were apportioned based on the 2010 United States census.

The Republican Party retained their majority in both the House and the Senate, and, with the inauguration of Donald Trump on January 20, 2017, attained an overall federal government trifecta, a position they had last attained in 2005 with the 109th Congress . It was the first time since the 111th Congress that the Democrats were not in control of the House.

Several political scientists described the legislative accomplishments of this Congress as modest, considering that both Congress and the presidency were under unified Republican Party control.

This is the most recent Congress with Democratic senators from the states of Florida (Bill Nelson), Indiana (Joe Donnelly), Missouri (Claire McCaskill) and North Dakota (Heidi Heitkamp), as well as a Republican senator from Nevada (Dean Heller), all of whom lost re-election in 2018.

== Major events ==
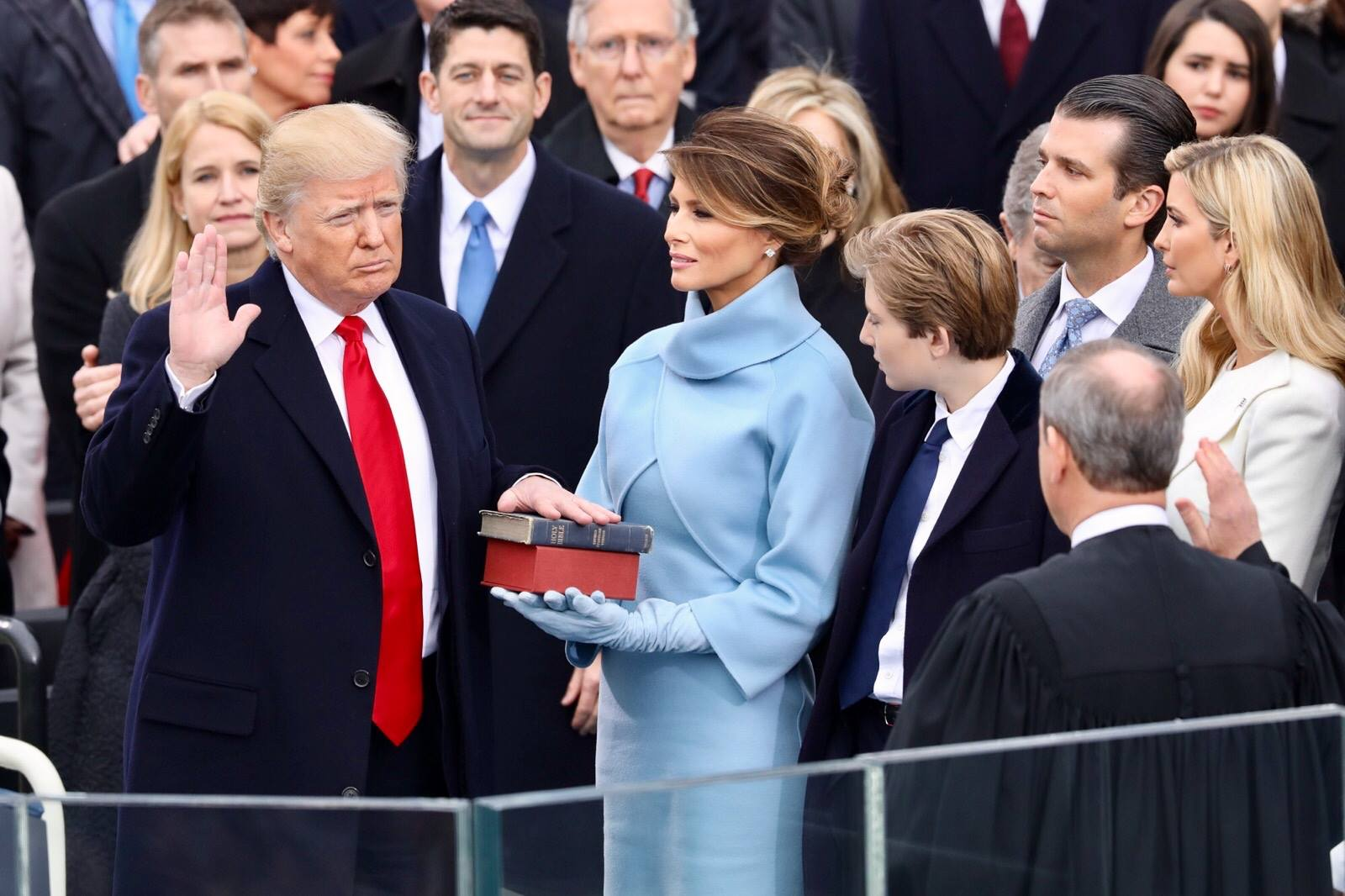
Donald Trump takes the oath of office as the 45th president of the United States.

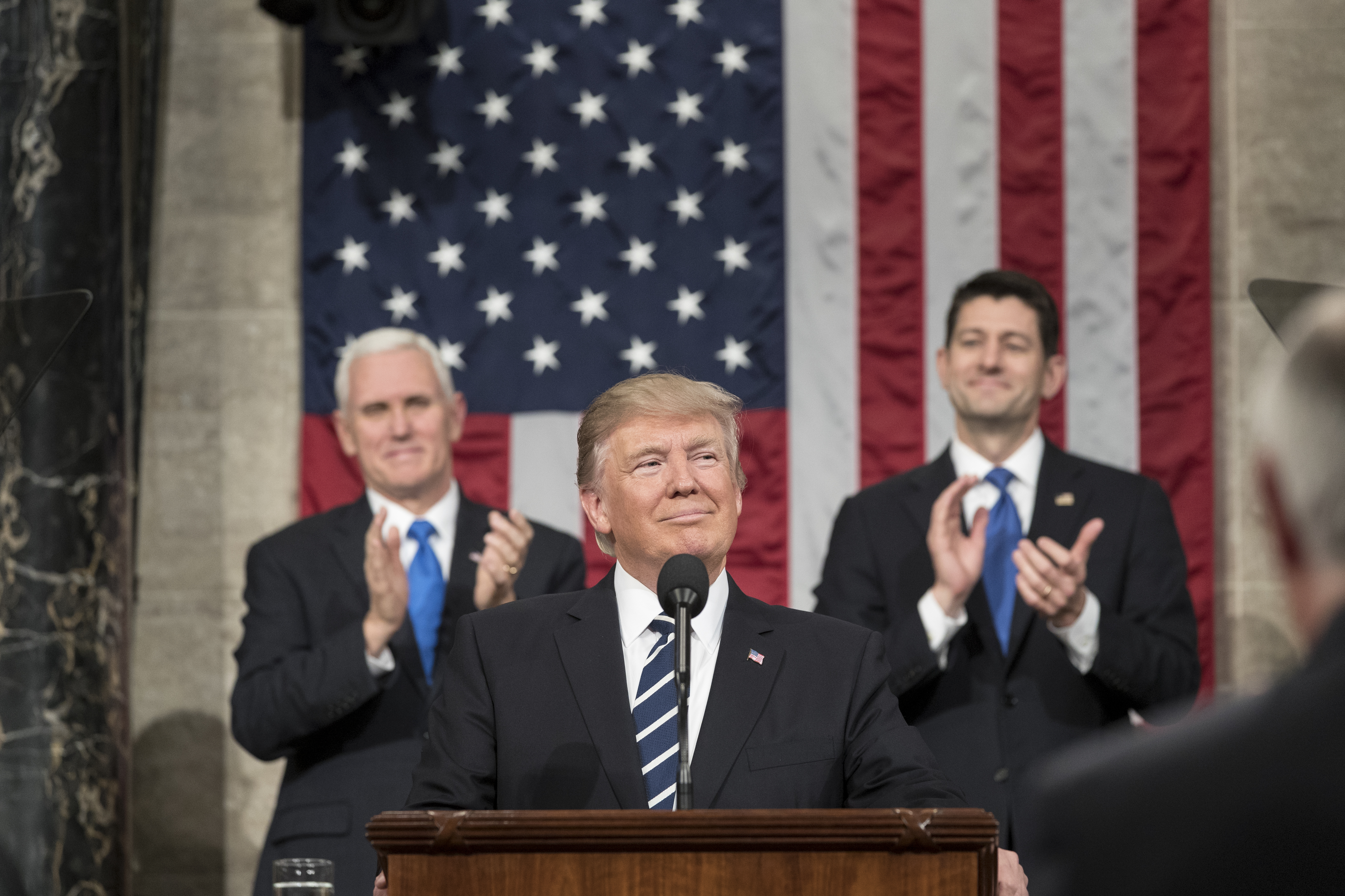
President Trump during his 2017 speech to a joint session of Congress, with Vice President Mike Pence and House Speaker Paul Ryan.

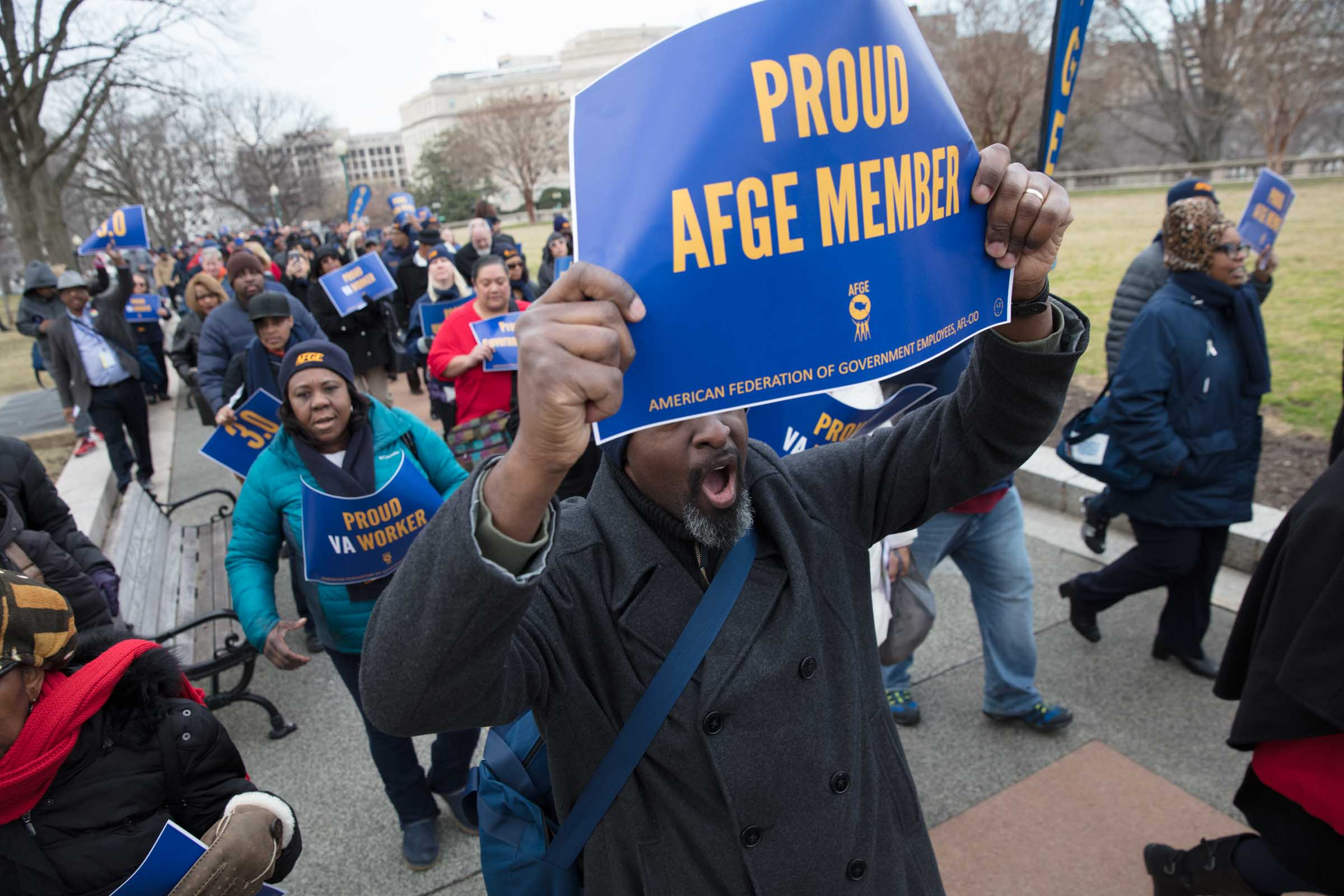
American Federation of Government Employees members protesting for the federal employees affected by the January 2018 government shutdown.

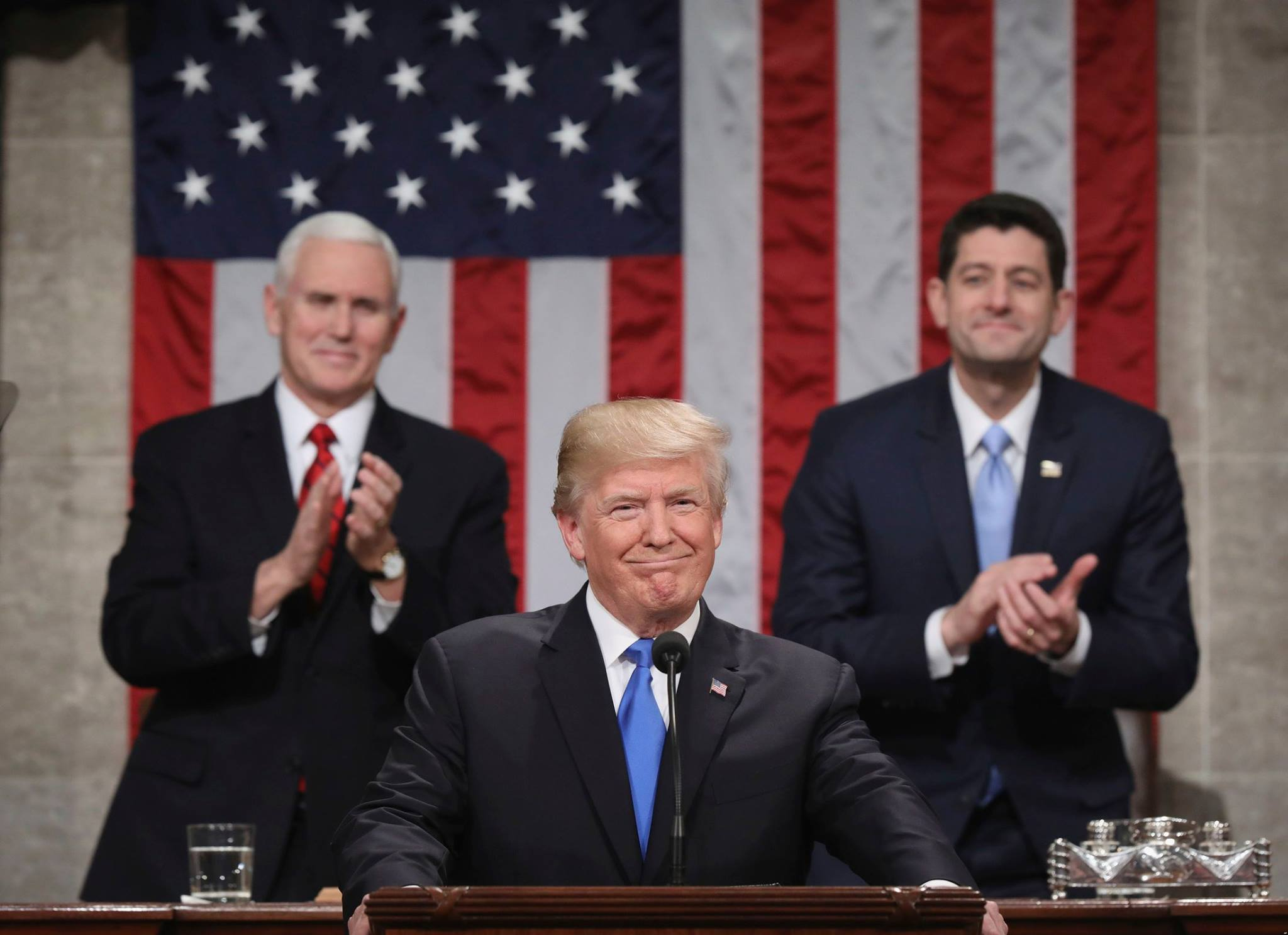
President Trump during his 2018 State of the Union Address, with Vice President Pence and House Speaker Ryan.

President Trump meeting with Nancy Pelosi and Chuck Schumer regarding the looming 2018–2019 government shutdown.

- January 3, 2017: 115th Congress officially begins.
- January 5, 2017: House of Representatives condemned United Nations Security Council Resolution 2334.
- January 6, 2017: A joint session to count the presidential Electoral College votes is held.
- January 11–12, 2017: Senate, in an all-night session, took first steps to repeal the Affordable Care Act, (ACA). The final vote was 51 to 48 to approve a budget resolution to allow "broad swaths of the Affordable Care Act to be repealed through a process known as budget reconciliation."
- January 20, 2017: The first inauguration of Donald Trump takes place. The Republicans gain a trifecta.
- February 7, 2017: Vice President Mike Pence cast the tie-breaking vote to confirm Betsy DeVos as Secretary of Education. This was the first time in United States history that a cabinet confirmation was tied in the Senate and required a tie-breaking vote.
- February 28, 2017: President Donald Trump addresses a joint session of Congress.
- April 6, 2017: Senate invoked the "nuclear option" to weaken Supreme Court filibusters. Nominee Neil Gorsuch was then confirmed the next day.
- June 14, 2017: Majority Whip Steve Scalise and several staffers were shot during the Congressional baseball shooting. They were practicing for the annual Congressional Baseball Game.
- September 1, 2017: The Parliamentarian of the United States Senate decreed that the Senate had until the end of the month to pass ACA repeal via the reconciliation process, or the option would no longer be viable.
- October 24 – December 14, 2017: 2017 United States political sexual scandals from the "Me too" movement:
  - Allegations that Democratic Congressman Ruben Kihuen sexually harassed a campaign staffer led some in congressional leadership to call for his resignation. Kihuen later announced he would not seek another term in office.
  - Democratic senator Al Franken announced he would resign "in the coming weeks" after photographs were made public suggesting that he sexually assaulted (groped) a Los Angeles-based radio personality during a USO tour in Iraq in 2006. He was also accused by multiple female constituents of groping at various Minnesota fair appearances that he attended.
  - Three members of Congress either resigned or announced their impending resignations. (See "Changes in membership")
  - Allegations that President Donald Trump previously raped and sexually harassed at least nineteen women, one girl, and Miss Teen USA contestants resulted in calls by members of Congress for him to resign.
  - Allegations that Republican Alabama Senate candidate Roy Moore previously raped and sexually harassed at least eight women and one girl contributed to his defeat by Democrat Doug Jones in a special Senate election to replace Attorney General Jeff Sessions.
  - Allegations that House member Blake Farenthold sexually harassed a former staffer resulted in the commencement of an investigation by the House Ethics Committee and his announcement he would not seek re-election in 2018. He subsequently resigned on April 6, 2018.
- January 20–22, 2018: United States federal government shutdown of January 2018
- January 30, 2018: President Trump delivers the 2018 State of the Union Address.
- February 9, 2018: United States federal government funding gap
- April 9, 2018: FBI raids the office of Donald Trump's personal lawyer Michael Cohen.
- October 6, 2018: Senate confirms Brett Kavanaugh's nomination to the U.S. Supreme Court.
- November 28, 2018: Senate discharges from committee and calendars S.J.Res. 54, bill that ends US intervention in the Yemeni Civil War.
- November 30, 2018: Former president George H. W. Bush dies at 94 years old.
- December 5, 2018: The funeral of former President George H. W. Bush took place.
- December 22, 2018 – January 25, 2019: 2018–19 United States federal government shutdown

== Major legislation ==
=== Enacted ===
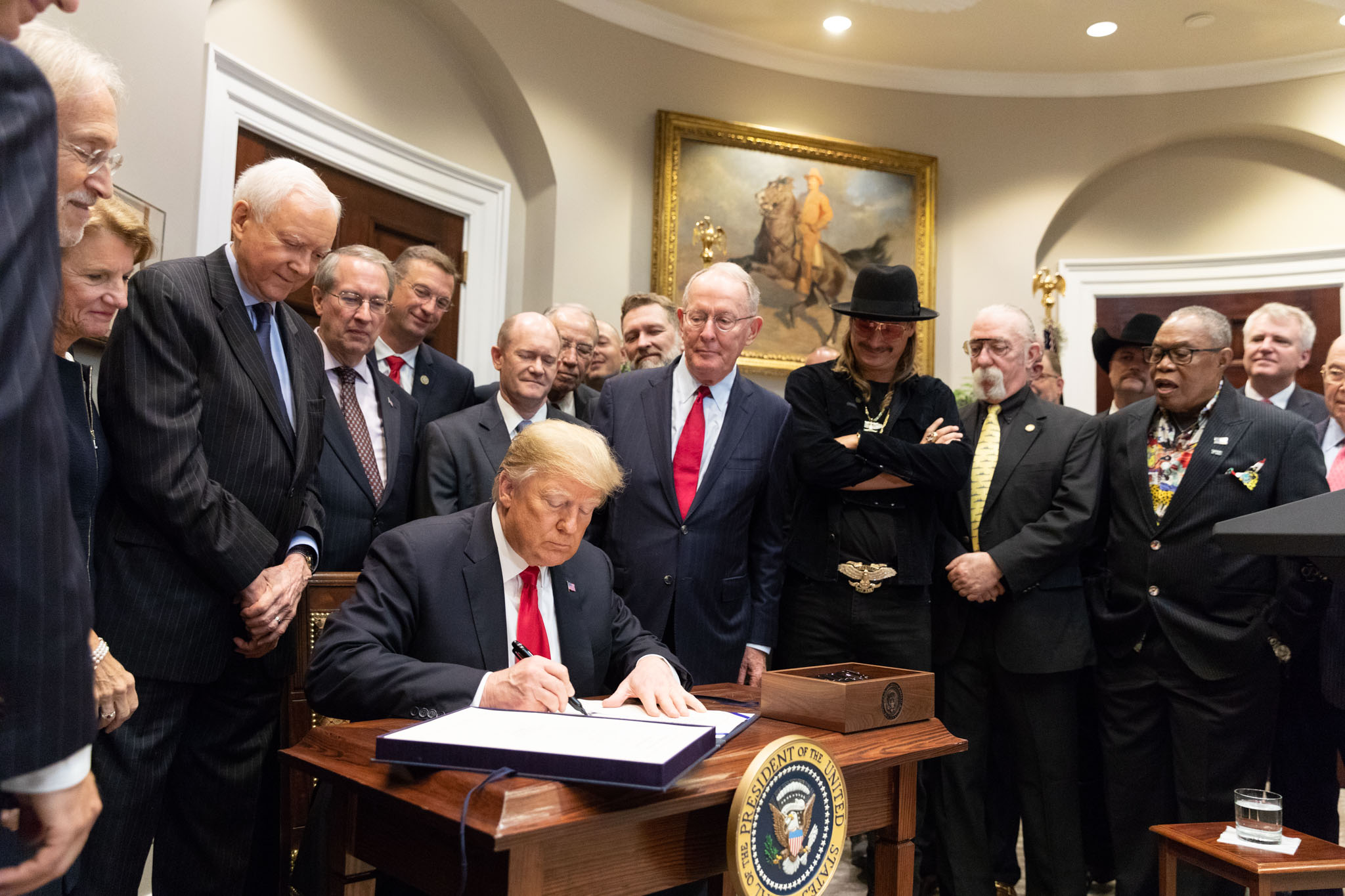
President Trump signing the Music Modernization Act

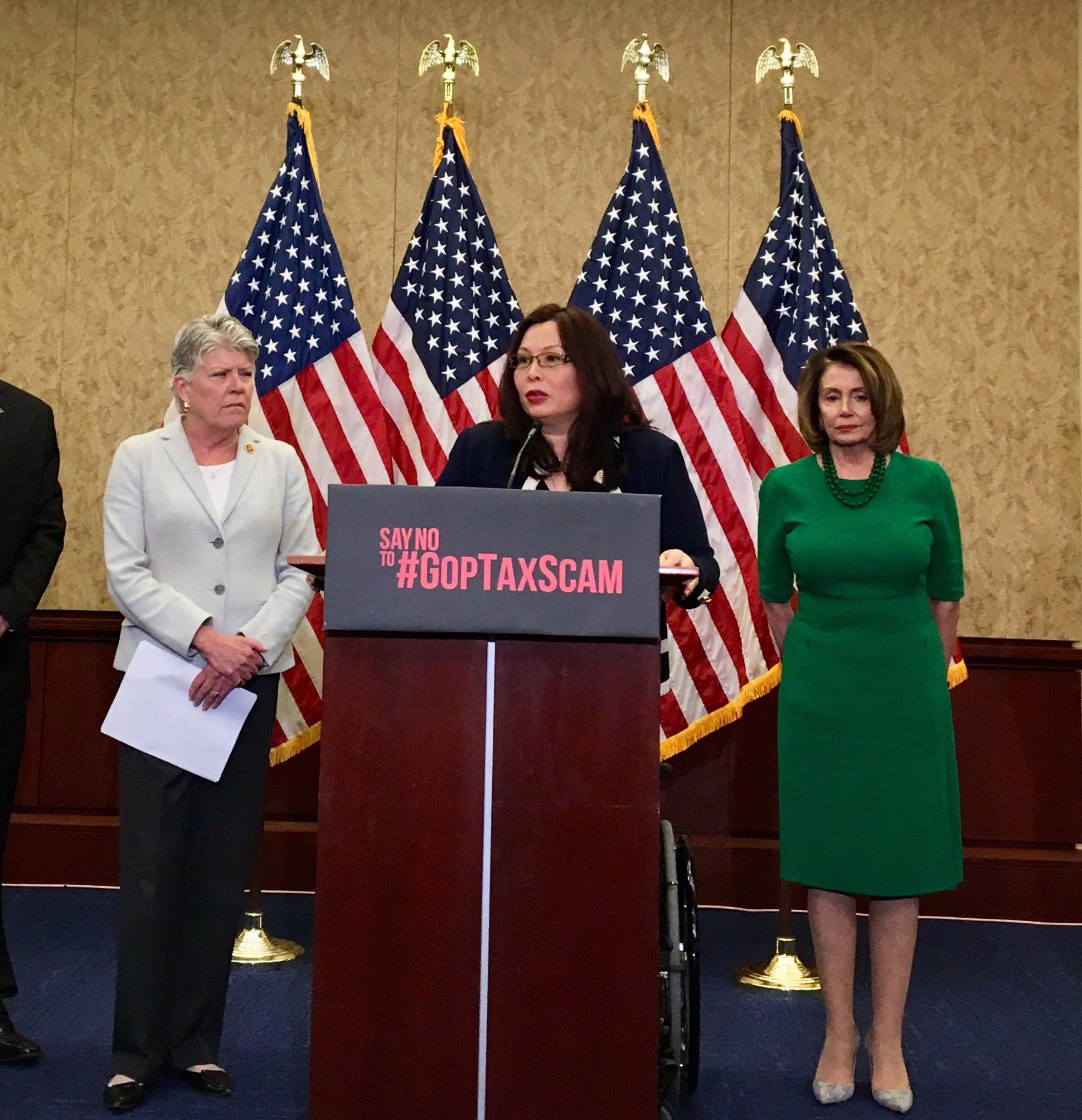
Senator Tammy Duckworth and then House Minority Leader Nancy Pelosi opposing the Tax Cuts and Jobs Act of 2017.

- January 31, 2017: GAO Access and Oversight Act of 2017, Pub.L. 115-3
- February 28, 2017: Promoting Women in Entrepreneurship Act, Pub.L. 115-6
- February 28, 2017: INSPIRE Women Act, Pub.L. 115-7
- March 28, 2017: Vietnam War Veterans Recognition Act of 2017, Pub.L. 115-15
- April 4, 2017: 2017 Broadband Consumer Privacy Proposal repeal
- April 18, 2017: Weather Research and Forecasting Innovation Act of 2017, Pub.L. 115-25
- May 5, 2017: Consolidated Appropriations Act, 2017, H.R. 244, Pub. L. 115–31 (text) (PDF)
- August 2, 2017: Countering America's Adversaries Through Sanctions Act, H.R. 3364, Pub. L. 115–44 (text) (PDF)
- October 18, 2017: Elder Abuse Prevention and Prosecution Act of 2017
- November 2, 2017: Strengthening State and Local Cyber Crime Fighting Act of 2017, Pub.L. 115-76
- December 12, 2017: National Defense Authorization Act for Fiscal Year 2018, H.R. 2810, Pub. L. 115–91 (text) (PDF)
- December 22, 2017: Tax Cuts and Jobs Act of 2017, H.R. 1, Pub. L. 115–97 (text) (PDF)
- February 9, 2018: Bipartisan Budget Act of 2018, H.R. 1892, Pub. L. 115–123 (text) (PDF)
- February 14, 2018: Protecting Young Victims from Sexual Abuse and Safe Sport Authorization Act of 2017, Pub.L. 115-126
- March 16, 2018: Taiwan Travel Act, H.R. 535, Pub. L. 115–135 (text) (PDF)
- March 23, 2018: Consolidated Appropriations Act, 2018 (including the CLOUD Act), H.R. 1625, Pub. L. 115–141 (text) (PDF)
- April 11, 2018: Stop Enabling Sex Traffickers Act, H.R. 1865, Pub. L. 115–164 (text) (PDF)
- May 9, 2018: Justice for Uncompensated Survivors Today (JUST) Act, Pub.L. 115-171
- May 24, 2018: Economic Growth, Regulatory Relief and Consumer Protection Act, S. 2155, Pub. L. 115–174 (text) (PDF)
- May 30, 2018: Trickett Wendler, Frank Mongiello, Jordan McLinn, and Matthew Bellina Right to Try Act of 2017, S. 204, Pub. L. 115–176 (text) (PDF)
- August 13, 2018: National Defense Authorization Act for Fiscal Year 2019, H.R. 5515, Pub. L. 115–232 (text) (PDF)
- October 5, 2018: FAA Reauthorization Act of 2018, H.R. 302, Pub. L. 115–254 (text) (PDF)
- October 9, 2018: Marrakesh Treaty Implementation Act, Pub.L. 115-261
- October 11, 2018: Music Modernization Act, H.R. 1551, Pub. L. 115–264 (text) (PDF)
- October 23, 2018: America's Water Infrastructure Act of 2018, S. 3021, Pub. L. 115–270 (text) (PDF)
- October 24, 2018: SUPPORT for Patients and Communities Act, H.R. 6, Pub. L. 115–271 (text) (PDF)
- November 16, 2018: Cybersecurity and Infrastructure Security Agency Act, H.R. 3359, Pub. L. 115–278 (text) (PDF)
- December 7, 2018: Amy, Vicky, and Andy Child Pornography Victim Assistance Act of 2018, Pub.L. 115-299
- December 11, 2018: Iraq and Syria Genocide Relief and Accountability Act of 2018, Pub.L. 115-300
- December 20, 2018: Agriculture Improvement Act of 2018, H.R. 2, Pub. L. 115–334 (text) (PDF)
- December 21, 2018: National Quantum Initiative Act, Pub.L. 115-368
- December 21, 2018: FIRST STEP Act, S. 756, Pub. L. 115–391 (text) (PDF)
- January 14, 2019: Foundations for Evidence-Based Policymaking Act of 2018, Pub.L. 115-435
- January 14, 2019: Elie Wiesel Genocide and Atrocities Prevention Act of 2018, Pub.L. 115-441
- November 1, 2017: Providing for congressional disapproval under chapter 8 of title 5, United States Code, of the rule submitted by Bureau of Consumer Financial Protection relating to "Arbitration Agreements

=== Proposed ===
- May 4, 2017: American Health Care Act (H.R. 1628), passed House May 4, 2017
- June 8, 2017: Financial CHOICE Act (H.R. 10), passed House June 8, 2017

== Party summary ==
Resignations and new members are discussed in the "Changes in membership" section, below.

=== Senate ===
Senate membership

Final (from December 31, 2018)

January 3, 2017 – February 8, 2017

February 8, 2017 – February 9, 2017

February 9, 2017 – January 2, 2018

January 2, 2018 – January 3, 2018

January 3, 2018 – April 1, 2018

April 1, 2018 – April 2, 2018

April 2, 2018 – August 25, 2018

August 25, 2018 – September 4, 2018

September 4, 2018 – December 31, 2018

| Affiliation | Party (shading indicates majority caucus) | | | Total | Vacant |
| Affiliation | Democratic | Independent (caucusing with Democrats) | Republican | Total | Vacant |
|---|---|---|---|---|---|
| End of previous Congress | 44 | 2 | 54 | 100 | 0 |
| Begin (January 3, 2017) | 46 | 2 | 52 | 100 | 0 |
| February 8, 2017 (Note: In Alabama, senator Jeff Sessions (R) resigned February 8, 2017. Luther Strange (R) was appointed February 9, 2017, to continue the term. Doug Jones (D) was elected to finish the term and qualified January 3, 2018.) | 46 | 2 | 51 | 99 | 1 |
| February 9, 2017 | 46 | 2 | 52 | 100 | 0 |
| January 2, 2018 (Note: In Minnesota, senator Al Franken (D) resigned January 2, 2018. Tina Smith (D) was appointed January 3, 2018, to continue the term.) | 45 | 2 | 52 | 99 | 1 |
| January 3, 2018 | 47 | 2 | 51 | 100 | 0 |
| April 1, 2018 (Note: In Mississippi, senator Thad Cochran (R) resigned April 1, 2018. Cindy Hyde-Smith (R) was appointed April 2, 2018, to continue the term.) | 47 | 2 | 50 | 99 | 1 |
| April 2, 2018 | 47 | 2 | 51 | 100 | 0 |
| August 25, 2018 (Note: In Arizona, senator John McCain (R) died August 25, 2018. Jon Kyl (R) was appointed September 4, 2018, to continue the term. Kyl announced his resignation, effective December 31, 2018.) | 47 | 2 | 50 | 99 | 1 |
| September 4, 2018 | 47 | 2 | 51 | 100 | 0 |
| December 31, 2018 | 47 | 2 | 50 | 99 | 1 |
| Final voting share | 49.5% | | 50.5% | | |
| Beginning of the next Congress | 45 | 2 | 52 | 99 | 1 |

=== House of Representatives ===
House membership (from December 31, 2018) 196 Democrats 236 Republicans 3 vacant

Ideological divisions in the House (on March 27, 2017) 69 Progressive Caucus Freedom Caucus 33 113 Other Democrats Other Republicans 156 11 Blue Dog Coalition Tuesday Group 48 4 vacant

| | Party (shading indicates majority caucus) | | | Total | Vacant |
| | Democratic | Independent | Republican | Total | Vacant |
|---|---|---|---|---|---|
| End of previous Congress | 187 | 0 | 246 | 433 | 2 |
| Begin (January 3, 2017) | 194 | 0 | 241 | 435 | 0 |
| January 23, 2017 (Note: In Kansas's 4th district: Mike Pompeo (R) resigned January 23, 2017, and Ron Estes (R) was elected April 11, 2017.) | 194 | 0 | 240 | 434 | 1 |
| January 24, 2017 (Note: In California's 34th district: Xavier Becerra (D) resigned January 24, 2017, and Jimmy Gomez (D) was elected June 6, 2017.) | 193 | 0 | 240 | 433 | 2 |
| February 10, 2017 (Note: In Georgia's 6th district: Tom Price (R) resigned February 10, 2017, and Karen Handel (R) was elected June 20, 2017.) | 193 | 0 | 239 | 432 | 3 |
| February 16, 2017 (Note: In South Carolina's 5th district: Mick Mulvaney (R) resigned February 16, 2017, and Ralph Norman (R) was elected June 20, 2017.) | 193 | 0 | 238 | 431 | 4 |
| March 1, 2017 (Note: In Montana's at-large district: Ryan Zinke (R) resigned March 1, 2017, and Greg Gianforte (R) was elected May 25, 2017.) | 193 | 0 | 237 | 430 | 5 |
| April 11, 2017 (Note: Service begins on the day of a special election, when qualified, not necessarily upon the oath of office.) | 193 | 0 | 238 | 431 | 4 |
| May 25, 2017 | 193 | 0 | 239 | 432 | 3 |
| June 6, 2017 | 194 | 0 | 239 | 433 | 2 |
| June 20, 2017 | 194 | 0 | 241 | 435 | 0 |
| June 30, 2017 (Note: In Utah's 3rd district: Jason Chaffetz (R) resigned June 30, 2017, and John Curtis (R) was elected November 7, 2017.) | 194 | 0 | 240 | 434 | 1 |
| October 21, 2017 (Note: In Pennsylvania's 18th district: Tim Murphy (R) resigned October 21, 2017, and Conor Lamb (D) was elected March 13, 2018.) | 194 | 0 | 239 | 433 | 2 |
| November 7, 2017 | 194 | 0 | 240 | 434 | 1 |
| December 5, 2017 (Note: In Michigan's 13th district: Rep. John Conyers (D) resigned December 5, 2017, and Brenda Jones (D) was elected November 6, 2018.) | 193 | 0 | 240 | 433 | 2 |
| December 8, 2017 (Note: In Arizona's 8th district: Trent Franks (R) resigned December 8, 2017, and Debbie Lesko (R) was elected April 24, 2018.) | 193 | 0 | 239 | 432 | 3 |
| January 15, 2018 (Note: In Ohio's 12th district: Pat Tiberi (R) resigned January 15, 2018, and Troy Balderson (R) was elected August 7, 2018, although the results weren't final until August 24, 2018.) | 193 | 0 | 238 | 431 | 4 |
| March 13, 2018 | 194 | 0 | 238 | 432 | 3 |
| March 16, 2018 (Note: In New York's 25th district: Louise Slaughter (D) died March 16, 2018, and Joseph D. Morelle (D) was elected November 6, 2018.) | 193 | 0 | 238 | 431 | 4 |
| April 6, 2018 (Note: In Texas's 27th district: Blake Farenthold (R) resigned April 6, 2018, and Michael Cloud (R) was elected June 30, 2018.) | 193 | 0 | 237 | 430 | 5 |
| April 23, 2018 (Note: In Oklahoma's 1st district: Jim Bridenstine (R) resigned April 23, 2018, and Kevin Hern (R) was elected November 6, 2018.) | 193 | 0 | 236 | 429 | 6 |
| April 24, 2018 | 193 | 0 | 237 | 430 | 5 |
| April 27, 2018 (Note: In Pennsylvania's 7th district: Pat Meehan (R) resigned April 27, 2018, and Mary Gay Scanlon (D) was elected November 6, 2018.) | 193 | 0 | 236 | 429 | 6 |
| May 12, 2018 (Note: In Pennsylvania's 15th district: Charlie Dent (R) resigned May 12, 2018 and Susan Wild (D) was elected November 6, 2018.) | 193 | 0 | 235 | 428 | 7 |
| June 30, 2018 | 193 | 0 | 236 | 429 | 6 |
| August 7, 2018 | 193 | 0 | 237 | 430 | 5 |
| September 10, 2018 (Note: In Florida's 6th district: Ron DeSantis (R) resigned September 10, 2018, to focus on the 2018 Florida gubernatorial election.) | 193 | 0 | 236 | 429 | 6 |
| September 30, 2018 (Note: In West Virginia's 3rd district: Evan Jenkins (R) resigned September 30, 2018.) | 193 | 0 | 235 | 428 | 7 |
| November 6, 2018 | 197 | 0 | 236 | 433 | 2 |
| December 31, 2018 (Note: In New Mexico's 1st district: Michelle Lujan Grisham (D) resigned December 31, 2018.) | 196 | 0 | 236 | 432 | 3 |
| Final voting share | 45.4% | 0.0% | 54.6% | | |
| Non-voting members | 3 | 1 | 2 | 6 | 0 |
| Beginning of the next Congress | 235 | 0 | 199 | 434 | 1 |

== Leadership ==
Section contents: Senate: Majority (R), Minority (D) • House: Majority (R), Minority (D)

=== Senate ===
Senate President

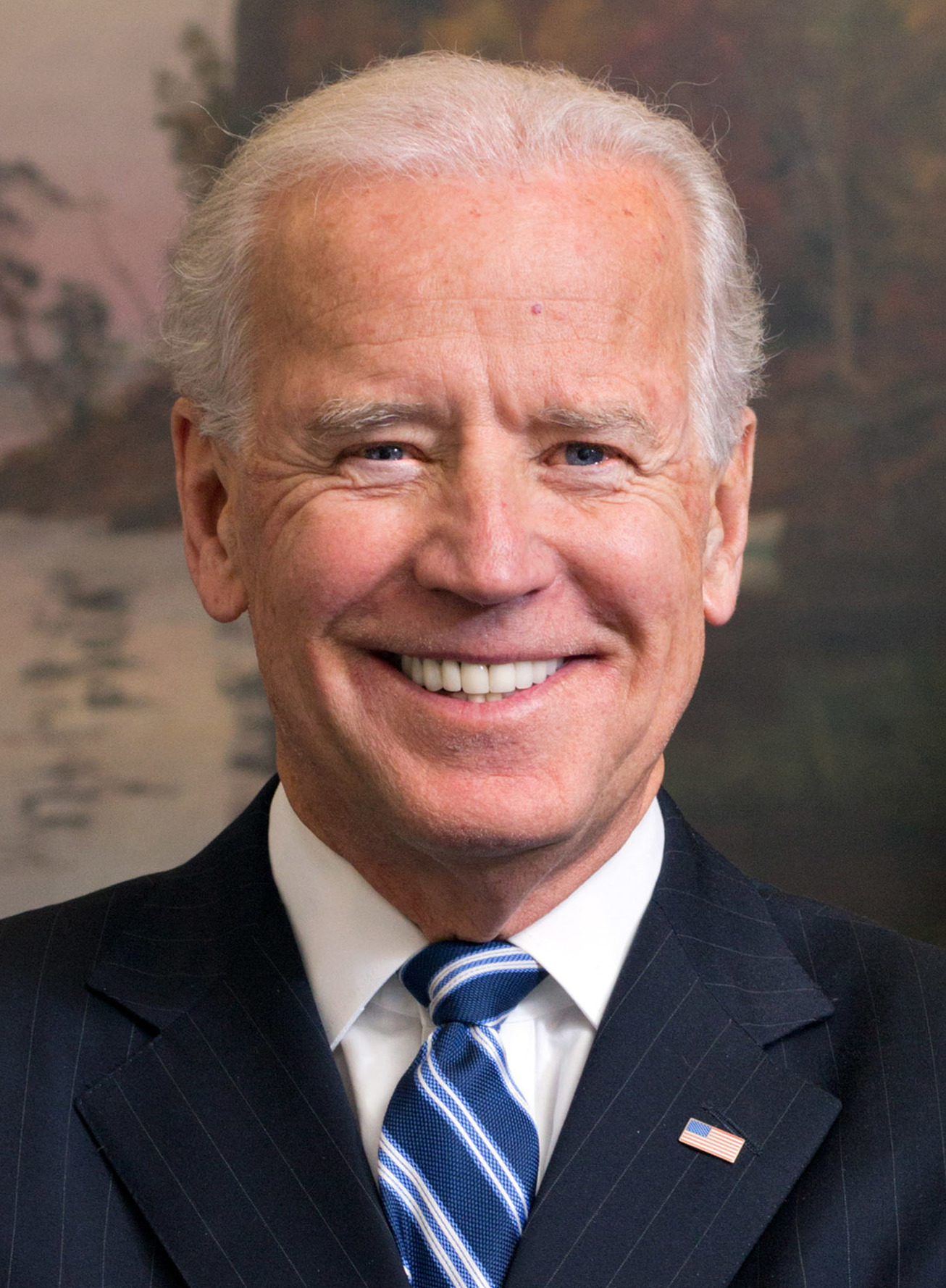
Joe Biden (D),
until January 20, 2017

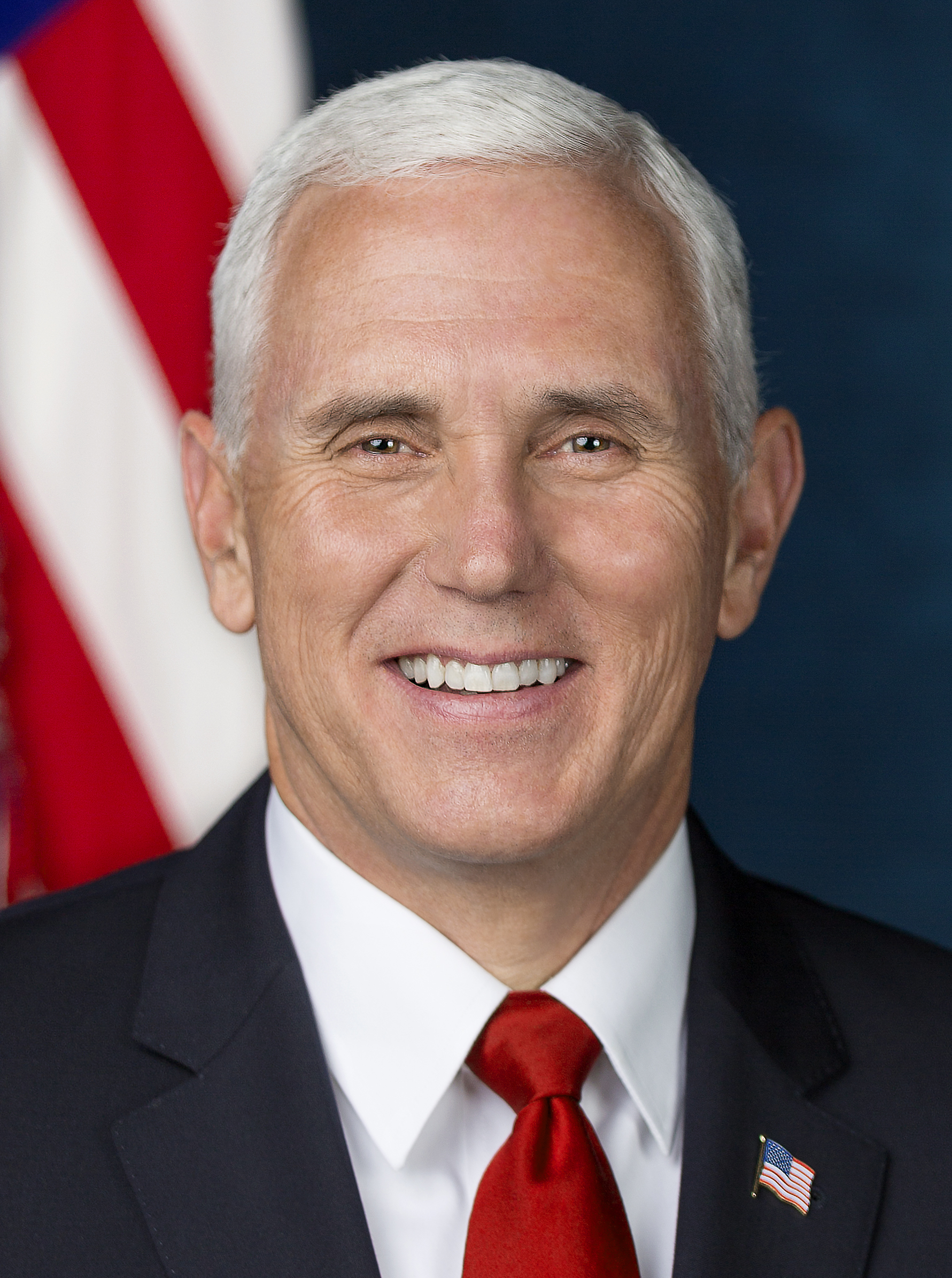
Mike Pence (R),
from January 20, 2017

Senate President pro tempore

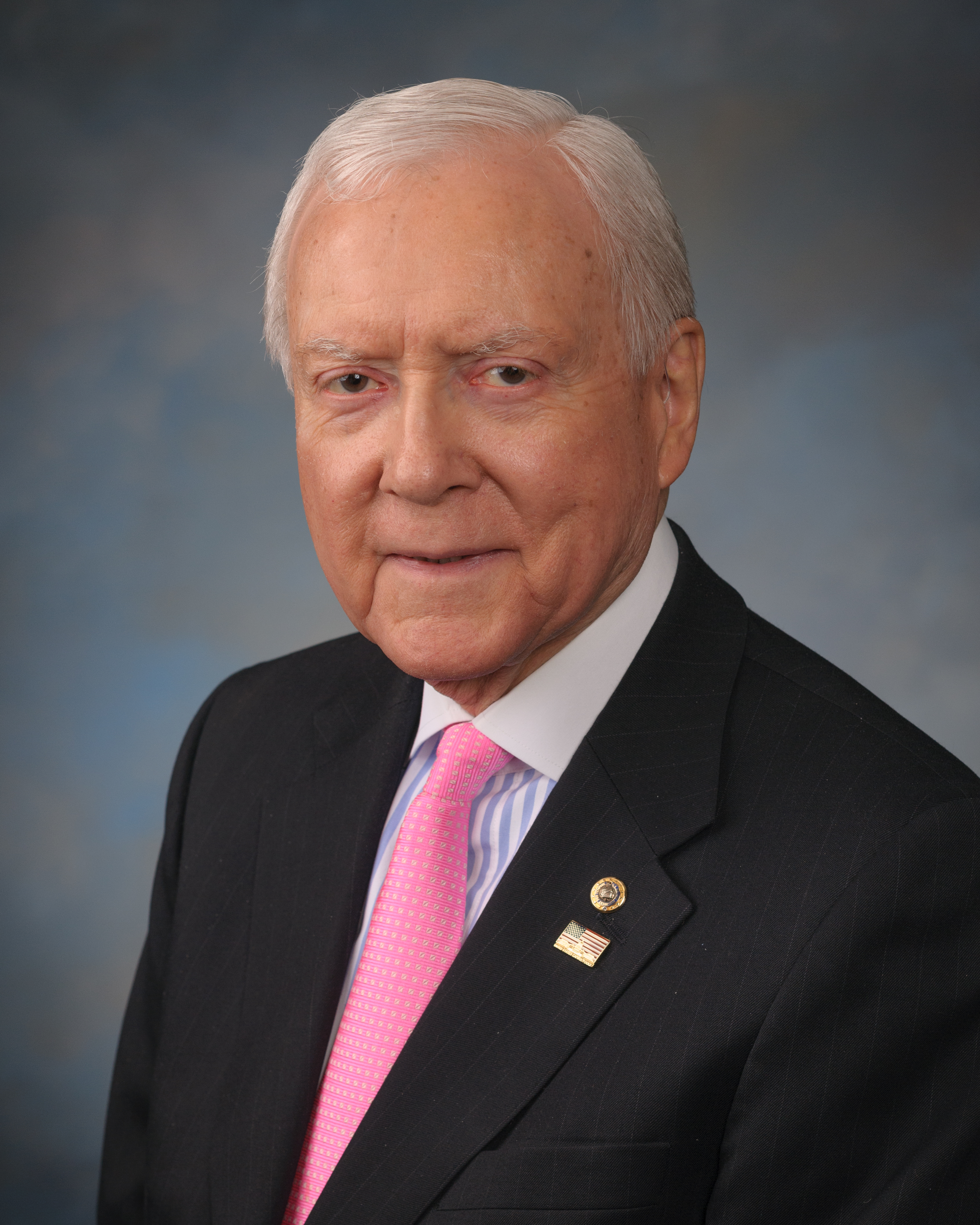
Orrin Hatch (R)

- President: Joe Biden (D), until January 20, 2017
  - Mike Pence (R), from January 20, 2017
- President pro tempore: Orrin Hatch (R)

==== Majority (Republican) leadership ====
- Majority Leader: Mitch McConnell
- Majority Whip: John Cornyn
- Republican Conference Chairman: John Thune
- Republican Conference Vice Chairman: Roy Blunt
- Republican Campaign Committee Chairman: Cory Gardner
- Policy Committee Chairman: John Barrasso

==== Minority (Democratic) leadership ====
- Minority Leader: Chuck Schumer
- Minority Whip: Dick Durbin
- Assistant Minority Leader: Patty Murray
- Democratic Caucus Chairman: Chuck Schumer
- Policy Committee Chairwoman: Debbie Stabenow
- Democratic Caucus Vice Chairs: Mark Warner and Elizabeth Warren
- Democratic Caucus Secretary: Tammy Baldwin
- Democratic Campaign Committee Chairman: Chris Van Hollen
- Policy Committee Vice Chairman: Joe Manchin
- Steering Committee Chairwoman: Amy Klobuchar
- Outreach Chair: Bernie Sanders
- Senate Democratic Chief Deputy Whips: Cory Booker, Jeff Merkley, and Brian Schatz

=== House of Representatives ===
House Speaker

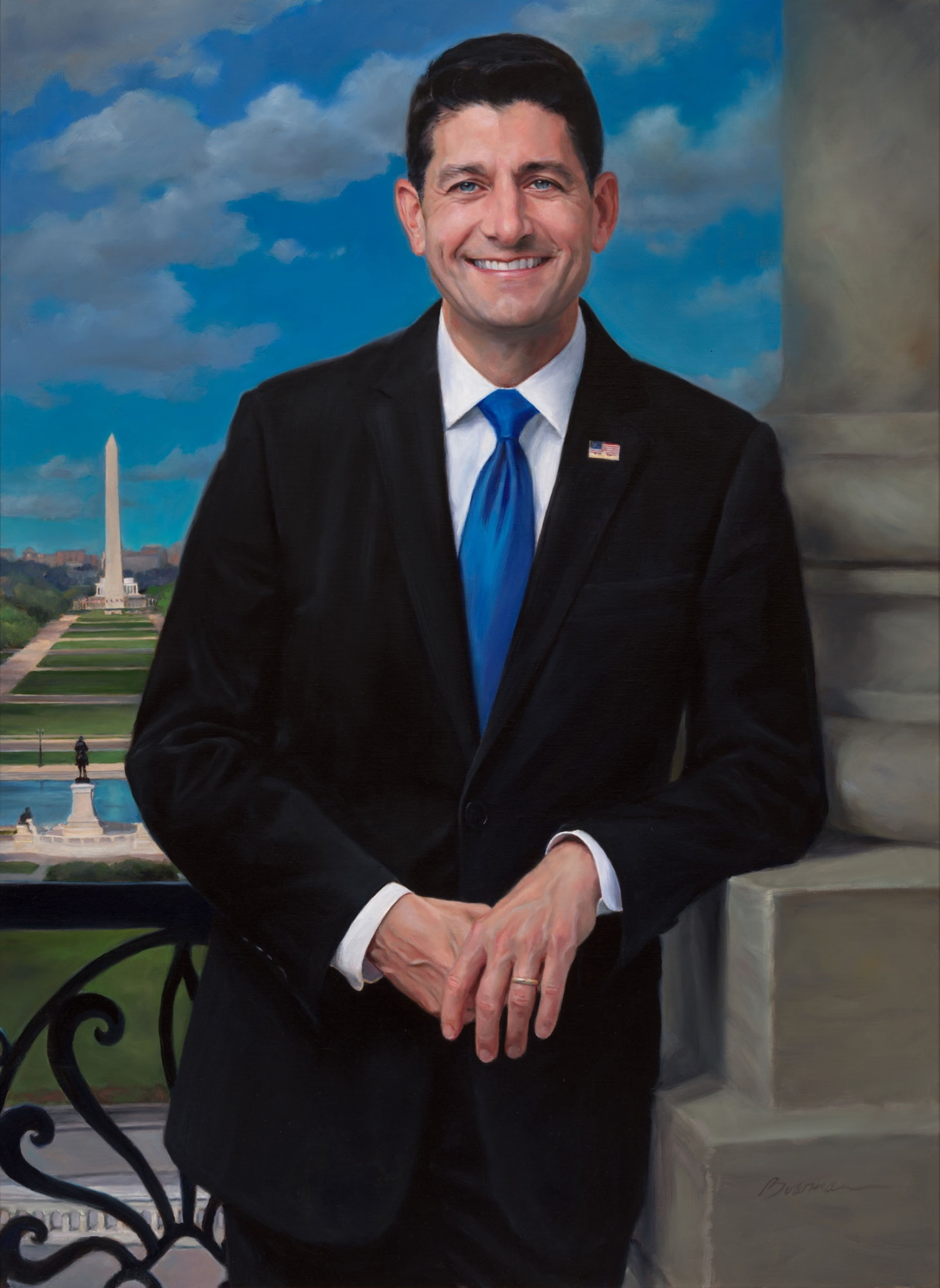
Paul Ryan (R)

- Speaker: Paul Ryan (R)

==== Majority (Republican) leadership ====
- Majority Leader: Kevin McCarthy
- Majority Whip: Steve Scalise
- Republican Conference Chairwoman: Cathy McMorris Rodgers
- Republican Conference Vice-Chairman: Doug Collins
- Republican Conference Secretary: Jason T. Smith
- Republican Campaign Committee Chairman: Steve Stivers
- Policy Committee Chairman: Luke Messer

==== Minority (Democratic) leadership ====
- Minority Leader: Nancy Pelosi
- Minority Whip: Steny Hoyer
- Assistant Minority Leader: Jim Clyburn
- Democratic Caucus Chairman: Joseph Crowley
- Democratic Caucus Vice-Chairwoman: Linda Sánchez
- Democratic Campaign Committee Chairman: Ben Ray Luján
- Steering and Policy Committee Co-Chairs: Rosa DeLauro and Eric Swalwell
- Policy and Communications Chairmen: Cheri Bustos, David Cicilline, and Hakeem Jeffries

== Demographics ==
Note: Demographics are accurate as of the commencement of the 115th Congress on January 3, 2017.

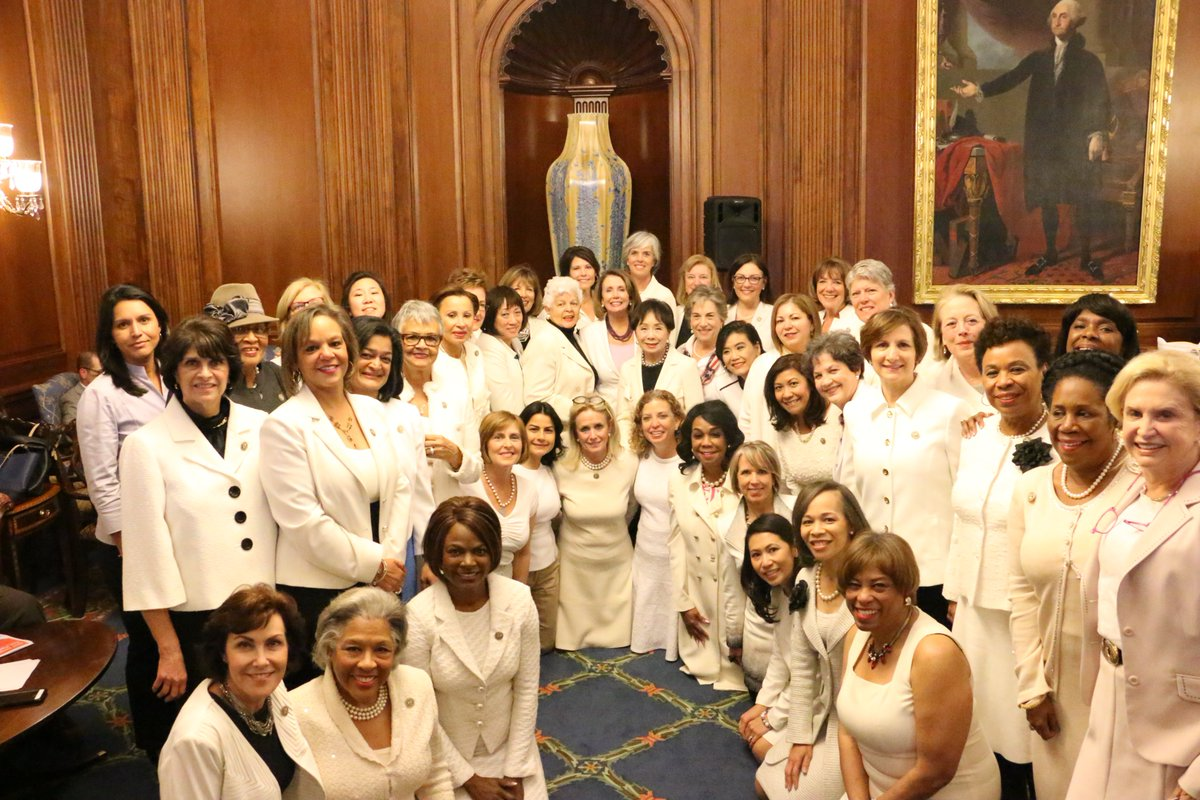
Democratic women in the House of Representatives wearing white to honor women's suffrage. (March 2017)

The average age of members of the House of Representatives during the 115th Congress was 57.8 years, while the average age of U.S. senators was 61.8 years.

The most common occupation of senators prior to being elected to their posts was law, followed by public service/politics and business. In the House of Representatives, business was the dominant prior occupation, followed by public service/politics and law. In the 115th Congress, 94.1% of House members and 100% of senators had attained a bachelor's degree or a higher degree; this was a historically high level of education for a United States Congress. In addition, 167 members of the House and 55 members of the Senate had law degrees. Only 18 members of Congress had no college education.

Ethnic minorities in the 115th Congress consisted of 52 African American members, 45 Hispanic or Latino members, 18 Asian-American or Pacific Islander members, and two members of Native American ancestry. Women comprised 20.1% of the membership in the 115th Congress, which had 109 women and 326 men. This represented an increase of 21 women from the 114th Congress.

Seven openly LGBT members served in the 115th Congress. Tammy Baldwin, Jared Polis, Sean Patrick Maloney, Mark Takano, David Cicilline, and Mark Pocan are openly gay, while Kyrsten Sinema is openly bisexual.

The majority of the 115th Congress was religiously affiliated, with 90.7% identifying as Christians. Approximately half of the Christians were Protestant. Other religious faiths of congressmembers in the 115th Congress included Buddhism, Hinduism, Islam, and Judaism.

== Members ==
=== Senate ===
The numbers refer to their Senate classes. All of the class 3 seats were contested in the November 2016 elections. Class 1 terms end with this Congress, requiring re-election in 2018; Class 2 began in the last Congress, requiring re-election in 2020; and Class 3 began in this Congress, requiring re-election in 2022.

==== Alabama ====
▌2. Jeff Sessions (R) (until February 8, 2017)

▌Luther Strange (R), (from February 9, 2017 to January 3, 2018)
▌Doug Jones (D), (from January 3, 2018)

▌3. Richard Shelby (R)

==== Alaska ====
▌2. Dan Sullivan (R)
▌3. Lisa Murkowski (R)

==== Arizona ====
▌1. Jeff Flake (R)
▌3. John McCain (R), (until August 25, 2018)

▌Jon Kyl (R), (from September 4, 2018 to December 31, 2018)
Vacant

==== Arkansas ====
▌2. Tom Cotton (R)
▌3. John Boozman (R)

==== California ====
▌1. Dianne Feinstein (D)
▌3. Kamala Harris (D)

==== Colorado ====
▌2. Cory Gardner (R)
▌3. Michael Bennet (D)

==== Connecticut ====
▌1. Chris Murphy (D)
▌3. Richard Blumenthal (D)

==== Delaware ====
▌1. Tom Carper (D)
▌2. Chris Coons (D)

==== Florida ====
▌1. Bill Nelson (D)
▌3. Marco Rubio (R)

==== Georgia ====
▌2. David Perdue (R)
▌3. Johnny Isakson (R)

==== Hawaii ====
▌1. Mazie Hirono (D)
▌3. Brian Schatz (D)

==== Idaho ====
▌2. Jim Risch (R)
▌3. Mike Crapo (R)

==== Illinois ====
▌2. Dick Durbin (D)
▌3. Tammy Duckworth (D)

==== Indiana ====
▌1. Joe Donnelly (D)
▌3. Todd Young (R)

==== Iowa ====
▌2. Joni Ernst (R)
▌3. Chuck Grassley (R)

==== Kansas ====
▌2. Pat Roberts (R)
▌3. Jerry Moran (R)

==== Kentucky ====
▌2. Mitch McConnell (R)
▌3. Rand Paul (R)

==== Louisiana ====
▌2. Bill Cassidy (R)
▌3. John Kennedy (R)

==== Maine ====
▌1. Angus King (I)
▌2. Susan Collins (R)

==== Maryland ====
▌1. Ben Cardin (D)
▌3. Chris Van Hollen (D)

==== Massachusetts ====
▌1. Elizabeth Warren (D)
▌2. Ed Markey (D)

==== Michigan ====
▌1. Debbie Stabenow (D)
▌2. Gary Peters (D)

==== Minnesota ====
▌1. Amy Klobuchar (DFL) (Note: The Minnesota Democratic–Farmer–Labor Party (DFL) and the North Dakota Democratic-Nonpartisan League Party (D-NPL) are the Minnesota and North Dakota affiliates of the U.S. Democratic Party and are counted as Democrats.)
▌ 2. Al Franken (DFL),(until January 2, 2018)

▌ Tina Smith (DFL),(from January 3, 2018)

==== Mississippi ====
▌1. Roger Wicker (R)
▌2. Thad Cochran (R), (until April 1, 2018)

▌Cindy Hyde-Smith (R), (from April 2, 2018)

==== Missouri ====
▌1. Claire McCaskill (D)
▌3. Roy Blunt (R)

==== Montana ====
▌1. Jon Tester (D)
▌2. Steve Daines (R)

==== Nebraska ====
▌1. Deb Fischer (R)
▌2. Ben Sasse (R)

==== Nevada ====
▌1. Dean Heller (R)
▌3. Catherine Cortez Masto (D)

==== New Hampshire ====
▌2. Jeanne Shaheen (D)
▌3. Maggie Hassan (D)

==== New Jersey ====
▌1. Bob Menendez (D)
▌2. Cory Booker (D)

==== New Mexico ====
▌1. Martin Heinrich (D)
▌2. Tom Udall (D)

==== New York ====
▌1. Kirsten Gillibrand (D)
▌3. Chuck Schumer (D)

==== North Carolina ====
▌2. Thom Tillis (R)
▌3. Richard Burr (R)

==== North Dakota ====
▌1. Heidi Heitkamp (D-NPL)
▌3. John Hoeven (R)

==== Ohio ====
▌1. Sherrod Brown (D)
▌3. Rob Portman (R)

==== Oklahoma ====
▌2. Jim Inhofe (R)
▌3. James Lankford (R)

==== Oregon ====
▌2. Jeff Merkley (D)
▌3. Ron Wyden (D)

==== Pennsylvania ====
▌1. Bob Casey Jr. (D)
▌3. Pat Toomey (R)

==== Rhode Island ====
▌1. Sheldon Whitehouse (D)
▌2. Jack Reed (D)

==== South Carolina ====
▌2. Lindsey Graham (R)
▌3. Tim Scott (R)

==== South Dakota ====
▌2. Mike Rounds (R)
▌3. John Thune (R)

==== Tennessee ====
▌1. Bob Corker (R)
▌2. Lamar Alexander (R)

==== Texas ====
▌1. Ted Cruz (R)
▌2. John Cornyn (R)

==== Utah ====
▌1. Orrin Hatch (R)
▌3. Mike Lee (R)

==== Vermont ====
▌1. Bernie Sanders (I)
▌3. Patrick Leahy (D)

==== Virginia ====
▌1. Tim Kaine (D)
▌2. Mark Warner (D)

==== Washington ====
▌1. Maria Cantwell (D)
▌3. Patty Murray (D)

==== West Virginia ====
▌1. Joe Manchin (D)
▌2. Shelley Moore Capito (R)

==== Wisconsin ====
▌1. Tammy Baldwin (D)
▌3. Ron Johnson (R)

==== Wyoming ====
▌1. John Barrasso (R)
▌2. Mike Enzi (R)

Party membership of the Senate, by state: 2 Democrats 2 Republicans 1 Democrat and 1 Republican 1 Independent and 1 Democrat 1 Independent and 1 Republican

Senate majority leadership

Senate Republican leader
Mitch McConnell

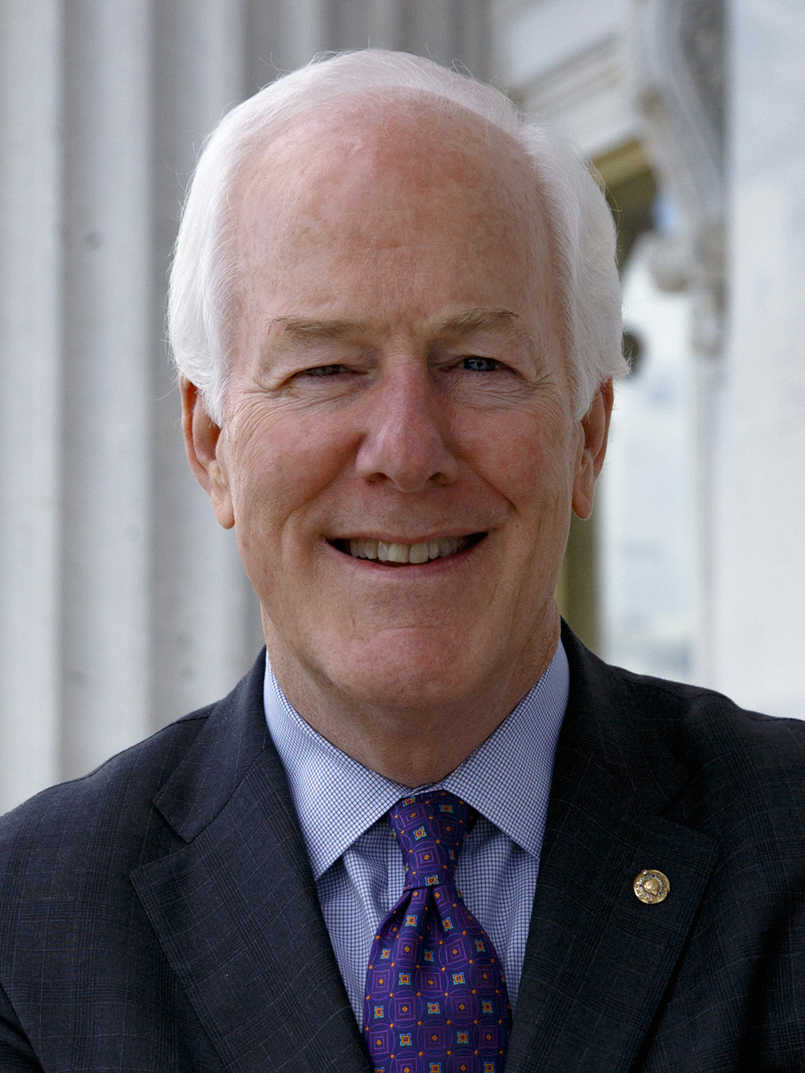
Senate Republican whip
John Cornyn

Senate minority leadership

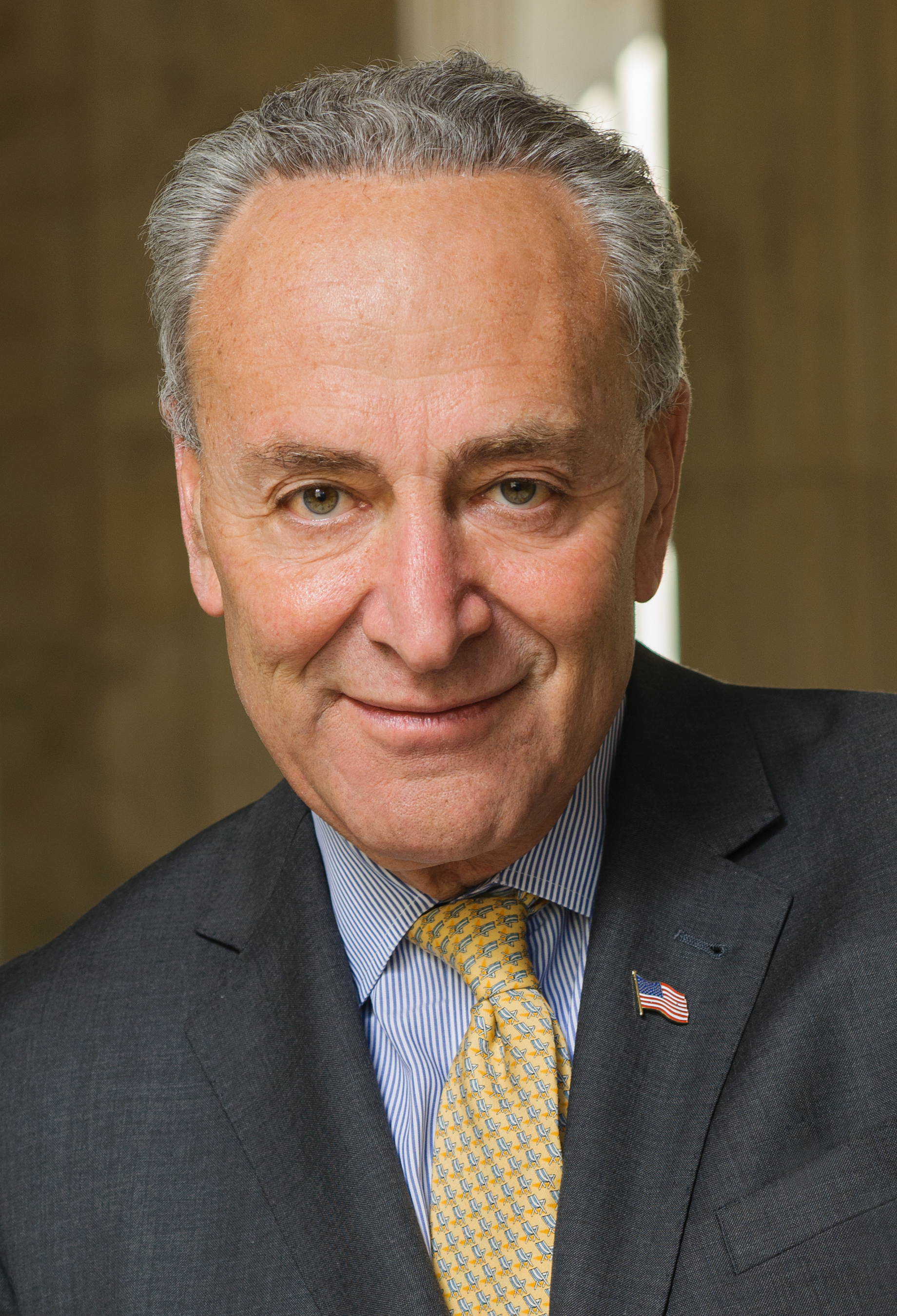
Senate Democratic leader
Chuck Schumer

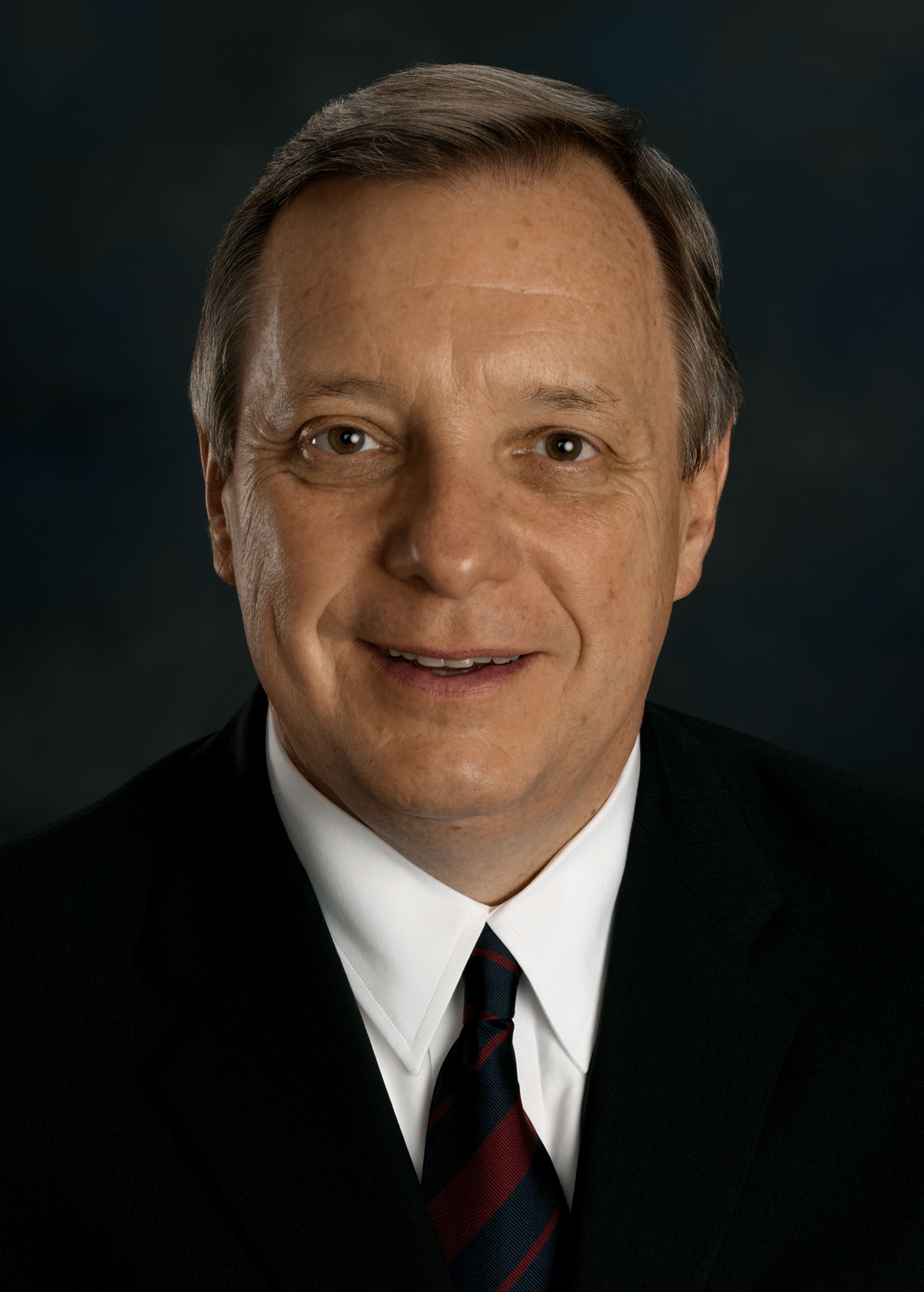
Senate Democratic whip
Richard Durbin

=== House of Representatives ===
All 435 seats were filled by the regular elections on November 8, 2016, or subsequent special elections thereafter.

==== Alabama ====
▌1. Bradley Byrne (R)
▌2. Martha Roby (R)
▌3. Mike Rogers (R)
▌4. Robert Aderholt (R)
▌5. Mo Brooks (R)
▌6. Gary Palmer (R)
▌7. Terri Sewell (D)

==== Alaska ====
▌At-large. Don Young (R)

==== Arizona ====
▌1. Tom O'Halleran (D)
▌2. Martha McSally (R)
▌3. Raúl Grijalva (D)
▌4. Paul Gosar (R)
▌5. Andy Biggs (R)
▌6. David Schweikert (R)
▌7. Ruben Gallego (D)
▌8. Trent Franks (R), until December 8, 2017

▌Debbie Lesko (R), from April 24, 2018

▌9. Kyrsten Sinema (D)

==== Arkansas ====
▌1. Rick Crawford (R)
▌2. French Hill (R)
▌3. Steve Womack (R)
▌4. Bruce Westerman (R)

==== California ====
▌1. Doug LaMalfa (R)
▌2. Jared Huffman (D)
▌3. John Garamendi (D)
▌4. Tom McClintock (R)
▌5. Mike Thompson (D)
▌6. Doris Matsui (D)
▌7. Ami Bera (D)
▌8. Paul Cook (R)
▌9. Jerry McNerney (D)
▌10. Jeff Denham (R)
▌11. Mark DeSaulnier (D)
▌12. Nancy Pelosi (D)
▌13. Barbara Lee (D)
▌14. Jackie Speier (D)
▌15. Eric Swalwell (D)
▌16. Jim Costa (D)
▌17. Ro Khanna (D)
▌18. Anna Eshoo (D)
▌19. Zoe Lofgren (D)
▌20. Jimmy Panetta (D)
▌21. David Valadao (R)
▌22. Devin Nunes (R)
▌23. Kevin McCarthy (R)
▌24. Salud Carbajal (D)
▌25. Steve Knight (R)
▌26. Julia Brownley (D)
▌27. Judy Chu (D)
▌28. Adam Schiff (D)
▌29. Tony Cárdenas (D)
▌30. Brad Sherman (D)
▌31. Pete Aguilar (D)
▌32. Grace Napolitano (D)
▌33. Ted Lieu (D)
▌34. Xavier Becerra (D), until January 24, 2017

▌Jimmy Gomez (D), from June 6, 2017

▌35. Norma Torres (D)
▌36. Raul Ruiz (D)
▌37. Karen Bass (D)
▌38. Linda Sánchez (D)
▌39. Ed Royce (R)
▌40. Lucille Roybal-Allard (D)
▌41. Mark Takano (D)
▌42. Ken Calvert (R)
▌43. Maxine Waters (D)
▌44. Nanette Barragán (D)
▌45. Mimi Walters (R)
▌46. Lou Correa (D)
▌47. Alan Lowenthal (D)
▌48. Dana Rohrabacher (R)
▌49. Darrell Issa (R)
▌50. Duncan D. Hunter (R)
▌51. Juan Vargas (D)
▌52. Scott Peters (D)
▌53. Susan Davis (D)

==== Colorado ====
▌1. Diana DeGette (D)
▌2. Jared Polis (D)
▌3. Scott Tipton (R)
▌4. Ken Buck (R)
▌5. Doug Lamborn (R)
▌6. Mike Coffman (R)
▌7. Ed Perlmutter (D)

==== Connecticut ====
▌1. John B. Larson (D)
▌2. Joe Courtney (D)
▌3. Rosa DeLauro (D)
▌4. Jim Himes (D)
▌5. Elizabeth Esty (D)

==== Delaware ====
▌At-large. Lisa Blunt Rochester (D)

==== Florida ====
▌1. Matt Gaetz (R)
▌2. Neal Dunn (R)
▌3. Ted Yoho (R)
▌4. John Rutherford (R)
▌5. Al Lawson (D)
▌6. Ron DeSantis (R), until September 10, 2018

Vacant

▌7. Stephanie Murphy (D)
▌8. Bill Posey (R)
▌9. Darren Soto (D)
▌10. Val Demings (D)
▌11. Daniel Webster (R)
▌12. Gus Bilirakis (R)
▌13. Charlie Crist (D)
▌14. Kathy Castor (D)
▌15. Dennis A. Ross (R)
▌16. Vern Buchanan (R)
▌17. Tom Rooney (R)
▌18. Brian Mast (R)
▌19. Francis Rooney (R)
▌20. Alcee Hastings (D)
▌21. Lois Frankel (D)
▌22. Ted Deutch (D)
▌23. Debbie Wasserman Schultz (D)
▌24. Frederica Wilson (D)
▌25. Mario Díaz-Balart (R)
▌26. Carlos Curbelo (R)
▌27. Ileana Ros-Lehtinen (R)

==== Georgia ====
▌1. Buddy Carter (R)
▌2. Sanford Bishop (D)
▌3. Drew Ferguson (R)
▌4. Hank Johnson (D)
▌5. John Lewis (D)
▌6. Tom Price (R), until February 10, 2017

▌Karen Handel (R), from June 20, 2017

▌7. Rob Woodall (R)
▌8. Austin Scott (R)
▌9. Doug Collins (R)
▌10. Jody Hice (R)
▌11. Barry Loudermilk (R)
▌12. Rick Allen (R)
▌13. David Scott (D)
▌14. Tom Graves (R)

==== Hawaii ====
▌1. Colleen Hanabusa (D)
▌2. Tulsi Gabbard (D)

==== Idaho ====
▌1. Raúl Labrador (R)
▌2. Mike Simpson (R)

==== Illinois ====
▌1. Bobby Rush (D)
▌2. Robin Kelly (D)
▌3. Dan Lipinski (D)
▌4. Luis Gutiérrez (D)
▌5. Mike Quigley (D)
▌6. Peter Roskam (R)
▌7. Danny Davis (D)
▌8. Raja Krishnamoorthi (D)
▌9. Jan Schakowsky (D)
▌10. Brad Schneider (D)
▌11. Bill Foster (D)
▌12. Mike Bost (R)
▌13. Rodney Davis (R)
▌14. Randy Hultgren (R)
▌15. John Shimkus (R)
▌16. Adam Kinzinger (R)
▌17. Cheri Bustos (D)
▌18. Darin LaHood (R)

==== Indiana ====
▌1. Pete Visclosky (D)
▌2. Jackie Walorski (R)
▌3. Jim Banks (R)
▌4. Todd Rokita (R)
▌5. Susan Brooks (R)
▌6. Luke Messer (R)
▌7. André Carson (D)
▌8. Larry Bucshon (R)
▌9. Trey Hollingsworth (R)

==== Iowa ====
▌1. Rod Blum (R)
▌2. Dave Loebsack (D)
▌3. David Young (R)
▌4. Steve King (R)

==== Kansas ====
▌1. Roger Marshall (R)
▌2. Lynn Jenkins (R)
▌3. Kevin Yoder (R)
▌4. Mike Pompeo (R), until January 23, 2017

▌Ron Estes (R), from April 11, 2017

==== Kentucky ====
▌1. James Comer (R)
▌2. Brett Guthrie (R)
▌3. John Yarmuth (D)
▌4. Thomas Massie (R)
▌5. Hal Rogers (R)
▌6. Andy Barr (R)

==== Louisiana ====
▌1. Steve Scalise (R)
▌2. Cedric Richmond (D)
▌3. Clay Higgins (R)
▌4. Mike Johnson (R)
▌5. Ralph Abraham (R)
▌6. Garret Graves (R)

==== Maine ====
▌1. Chellie Pingree (D)
▌2. Bruce Poliquin (R)

==== Maryland ====
▌1. Andy Harris (R)
▌2. Dutch Ruppersberger (D)
▌3. John Sarbanes (D)
▌4. Anthony Brown (D)
▌5. Steny Hoyer (D)
▌6. John Delaney (D)
▌7. Elijah Cummings (D)
▌8. Jamie Raskin (D)

==== Massachusetts ====
▌1. Richard Neal (D)
▌2. Jim McGovern (D)
▌3. Niki Tsongas (D)
▌4. Joseph P. Kennedy III (D)
▌5. Katherine Clark (D)
▌6. Seth Moulton (D)
▌7. Mike Capuano (D)
▌8. Stephen Lynch (D)
▌9. Bill Keating (D)

==== Michigan ====
▌1. Jack Bergman (R)
▌2. Bill Huizenga (R)
▌3. Justin Amash (R)
▌4. John Moolenaar (R)
▌5. Dan Kildee (D)
▌6. Fred Upton (R)
▌7. Tim Walberg (R)
▌8. Mike Bishop (R)
▌9. Sander Levin (D)
▌10. Paul Mitchell (R)
▌11. Dave Trott (R)
▌12. Debbie Dingell (D)
▌13. John Conyers (D), until December 5, 2017

▌Brenda Jones (D), from November 29, 2018

▌14. Brenda Lawrence (D)

==== Minnesota ====
▌1. Tim Walz (DFL)
▌2. Jason Lewis (R)
▌3. Erik Paulsen (R)
▌4. Betty McCollum (DFL)
▌5. Keith Ellison (DFL)
▌6. Tom Emmer (R)
▌7. Collin Peterson (DFL)
▌8. Rick Nolan (DFL)

==== Mississippi ====
▌1. Trent Kelly (R)
▌2. Bennie Thompson (D)
▌3. Gregg Harper (R)
▌4. Steven Palazzo (R)

==== Missouri ====
▌1. Lacy Clay (D)
▌2. Ann Wagner (R)
▌3. Blaine Luetkemeyer (R)
▌4. Vicky Hartzler (R)
▌5. Emanuel Cleaver (D)
▌6. Sam Graves (R)
▌7. Billy Long (R)
▌8. Jason Smith (R)

==== Montana ====
▌At-large. Ryan Zinke (R), until March 1, 2017

▌Greg Gianforte (R), from May 25, 2017

==== Nebraska ====
▌1. Jeff Fortenberry (R)
▌2. Don Bacon (R)
▌3. Adrian Smith (R)

==== Nevada ====
▌1. Dina Titus (D)
▌2. Mark Amodei (R)
▌3. Jacky Rosen (D)
▌4. Ruben Kihuen (D)

==== New Hampshire ====
▌1. Carol Shea-Porter (D)
▌2. Annie Kuster (D)

==== New Jersey ====
▌1. Donald Norcross (D)
▌2. Frank LoBiondo (R)
▌3. Tom MacArthur (R)
▌4. Chris Smith (R)
▌5. Josh Gottheimer (D)
▌6. Frank Pallone (D)
▌7. Leonard Lance (R)
▌8. Albio Sires (D)
▌9. Bill Pascrell (D)
▌10. Donald Payne Jr. (D)
▌11. Rodney Frelinghuysen (R)
▌12. Bonnie Watson Coleman (D)

==== New Mexico ====
▌1. Michelle Lujan Grisham (D), until December 31, 2018

Vacant

▌2. Steve Pearce (R)
▌3. Ben Ray Luján (D)

==== New York ====
▌1. Lee Zeldin (R)
▌2. Peter T. King (R)
▌3. Thomas Suozzi (D)
▌4. Kathleen Rice (D)
▌5. Gregory Meeks (D)
▌6. Grace Meng (D)
▌7. Nydia Velázquez (D)
▌8. Hakeem Jeffries (D)
▌9. Yvette Clarke (D)
▌10. Jerrold Nadler (D)
▌11. Dan Donovan (R)
▌12. Carolyn Maloney (D)
▌13. Adriano Espaillat (D)
▌14. Joseph Crowley (D)
▌15. José E. Serrano (D)
▌16. Eliot Engel (D)
▌17. Nita Lowey (D)
▌18. Sean Patrick Maloney (D)
▌19. John Faso (R)
▌20. Paul Tonko (D)
▌21. Elise Stefanik (R)
▌22. Claudia Tenney (R)
▌23. Tom Reed (R)
▌24. John Katko (R)
▌25. Louise Slaughter (D), until March 16, 2018

▌Joseph D. Morelle (D), from November 6, 2018

▌26. Brian Higgins (D)
▌27. Chris Collins (R)

==== North Carolina ====
▌1. G. K. Butterfield (D)
▌2. George Holding (R)
▌3. Walter B. Jones Jr. (R)
▌4. David Price (D)
▌5. Virginia Foxx (R)
▌6. Mark Walker (R)
▌7. David Rouzer (R)
▌8. Richard Hudson (R)
▌9. Robert Pittenger (R)
▌10. Patrick McHenry (R)
▌11. Mark Meadows (R)
▌12. Alma Adams (D)
▌13. Ted Budd (R)

==== North Dakota ====
▌At-large. Kevin Cramer (R)

==== Ohio ====
▌1. Steve Chabot (R)
▌2. Brad Wenstrup (R)
▌3. Joyce Beatty (D)
▌4. Jim Jordan (R)
▌5. Bob Latta (R)
▌6. Bill Johnson (R)
▌7. Bob Gibbs (R)
▌8. Warren Davidson (R)
▌9. Marcy Kaptur (D)
▌10. Mike Turner (R)
▌11. Marcia Fudge (D)
▌12. Pat Tiberi (R), until January 15, 2018

▌Troy Balderson (R), from August 7, 2018 (Note: In Ohio's 12th congressional district, the special election on August 7, 2018, was so close that it was not settled until August 24, 2018.)

▌13. Tim Ryan (D)
▌14. David Joyce (R)
▌15. Steve Stivers (R)
▌16. Jim Renacci (R)

==== Oklahoma ====
▌1. Jim Bridenstine (R), until April 23, 2018

▌Kevin Hern (R), from November 6, 2018

▌2. Markwayne Mullin (R)
▌3. Frank Lucas (R)
▌4. Tom Cole (R)
▌5. Steve Russell (R)

==== Oregon ====
▌1. Suzanne Bonamici (D)
▌2. Greg Walden (R)
▌3. Earl Blumenauer (D)
▌4. Peter DeFazio (D)
▌5. Kurt Schrader (D)

==== Pennsylvania ====
▌1. Bob Brady (D)
▌2. Dwight Evans (D)
▌3. Mike Kelly (R)
▌4. Scott Perry (R)
▌5. Glenn Thompson (R)
▌6. Ryan Costello (R)
▌7. Pat Meehan (R), until April 27, 2018

▌Mary Gay Scanlon (D), from November 6, 2018

▌8. Brian Fitzpatrick (R)
▌9. Bill Shuster (R)
▌10. Tom Marino (R)
▌11. Lou Barletta (R)
▌12. Keith Rothfus (R)
▌13. Brendan Boyle (D)
▌14. Mike Doyle (D)
▌15. Charlie Dent (R), until May 12, 2018

▌Susan Wild (D), from November 6, 2018

▌16. Lloyd Smucker (R)
▌17. Matt Cartwright (D)
▌18. Tim Murphy (R), until October 21, 2017

▌Conor Lamb (D) from March 13, 2018

==== Rhode Island ====
▌1. David Cicilline (D)
▌2. James Langevin (D)

==== South Carolina ====
▌1. Mark Sanford (R)
▌2. Joe Wilson (R)
▌3. Jeff Duncan (R)
▌4. Trey Gowdy (R)
▌5. Mick Mulvaney (R), until February 16, 2017

▌Ralph Norman (R), from June 20, 2017

▌6. Jim Clyburn (D)
▌7. Tom Rice (R)

==== South Dakota ====
▌At-large. Kristi Noem (R)

==== Tennessee ====
▌1. Phil Roe (R)
▌2. Jimmy Duncan (R)
▌3. Chuck Fleischmann (R)
▌4. Scott DesJarlais (R)
▌5. Jim Cooper (D)
▌6. Diane Black (R)
▌7. Marsha Blackburn (R)
▌8. David Kustoff (R)
▌9. Steve Cohen (D)

==== Texas ====
▌1. Louie Gohmert (R)
▌2. Ted Poe (R)
▌3. Sam Johnson (R)
▌4. John Ratcliffe (R)
▌5. Jeb Hensarling (R)
▌6. Joe Barton (R)
▌7. John Culberson (R)
▌8. Kevin Brady (R)
▌9. Al Green (D)
▌10. Michael McCaul (R)
▌11. Mike Conaway (R)
▌12. Kay Granger (R)
▌13. Mac Thornberry (R)
▌14. Randy Weber (R)
▌15. Vicente Gonzalez (D)
▌16. Beto O'Rourke (D)
▌17. Bill Flores (R)
▌18. Sheila Jackson Lee (D)
▌19. Jodey Arrington (R)
▌20. Joaquín Castro (D)
▌21. Lamar Smith (R)
▌22. Pete Olson (R)
▌23. Will Hurd (R)
▌24. Kenny Marchant (R)
▌25. Roger Williams (R)
▌26. Michael Burgess (R)
▌27. Blake Farenthold (R), until April 6, 2018

▌Michael Cloud (R), from June 30, 2018

▌28. Henry Cuellar (D)
▌29. Gene Green (D)
▌30. Eddie Bernice Johnson (D)
▌31. John Carter (R)
▌32. Pete Sessions (R)
▌33. Marc Veasey (D)
▌34. Filemon Vela Jr. (D)
▌35. Lloyd Doggett (D)
▌36. Brian Babin (R)

==== Utah ====
▌1. Rob Bishop (R)
▌2. Chris Stewart (R)
▌3. Jason Chaffetz (R), until June 30, 2017

▌John Curtis (R), from November 7, 2017

▌4. Mia Love (R)

==== Vermont ====
▌At-large. Peter Welch (D)

==== Virginia ====
▌1. Rob Wittman (R)
▌2. Scott Taylor (R)
▌3. Bobby Scott (D)
▌4. Donald McEachin (D)
▌5. Tom Garrett (R)
▌6. Bob Goodlatte (R)
▌7. Dave Brat (R)
▌8. Don Beyer (D)
▌9. Morgan Griffith (R)
▌10. Barbara Comstock (R)
▌11. Gerry Connolly (D)

==== Washington ====
▌1. Suzan DelBene (D)
▌2. Rick Larsen (D)
▌3. Jaime Herrera Beutler (R)
▌4. Dan Newhouse (R)
▌5. Cathy McMorris Rodgers (R)
▌6. Derek Kilmer (D)
▌7. Pramila Jayapal (D)
▌8. Dave Reichert (R)
▌9. Adam Smith (D)
▌10. Denny Heck (D)

==== West Virginia ====
▌1. David McKinley (R)
▌2. Alex Mooney (R)
▌3. Evan Jenkins (R), until September 30, 2018

Vacant

==== Wisconsin ====
▌1. Paul Ryan (R)
▌2. Mark Pocan (D)
▌3. Ron Kind (D)
▌4. Gwen Moore (D)
▌5. Jim Sensenbrenner (R)
▌6. Glenn Grothman (R)
▌7. Sean Duffy (R)
▌8. Mike Gallagher (R)

==== Wyoming ====
▌At-large. Liz Cheney (R)

==== Non-voting members ====
▌American Samoa. Amata Coleman Radewagen (R)
▌District of Columbia. Eleanor Holmes Norton (D)
▌Guam. Madeleine Bordallo (D)
▌Northern Mariana Islands. Gregorio Sablan (I)
▌Puerto Rico. Jenniffer González (PNP/R) (Resident Commissioner)
▌United States Virgin Islands. Stacey Plaskett (D)

Results of the 2016 elections that were first seated in this Congress. Pale blue are Democratic holds; pale red are Republican holds; bright blue are Democratic gains; bright red are Republican gains.

House votes by party holding plurality in state: Democratic; 100% 80-99% 70-79% 60-69% 51-59% 50% / Republican; 100% 80-99% 70-79% 60-69% 51-59% 50%

House majority leadership

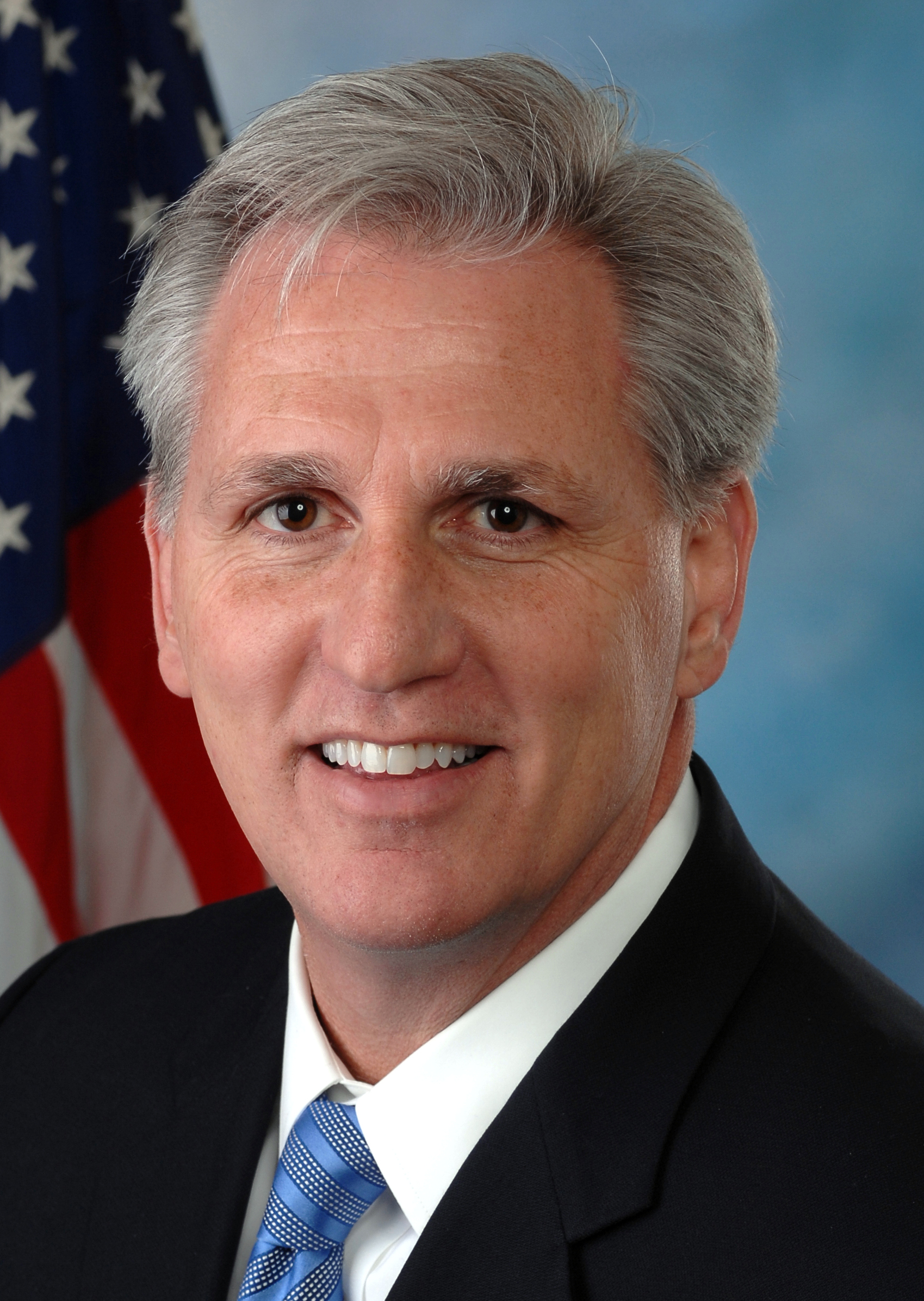
House Republican leader
Kevin McCarthy

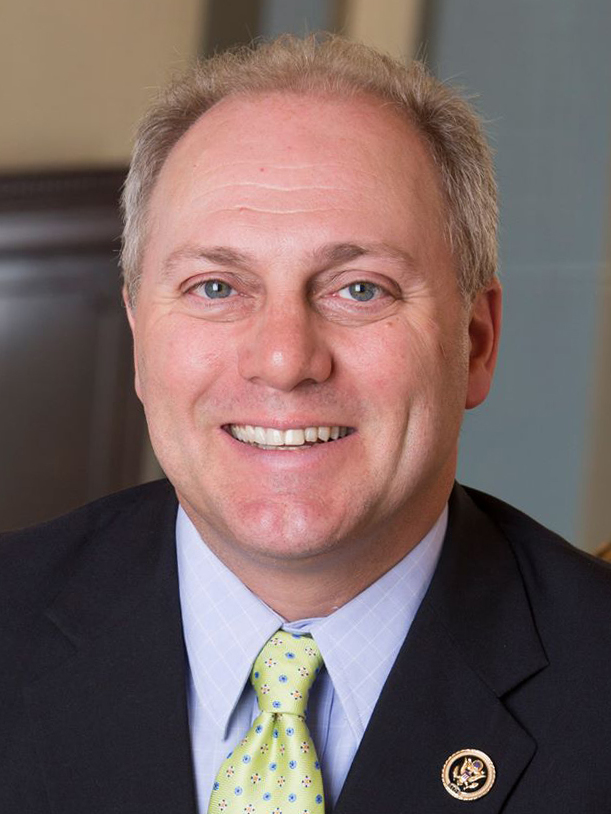
House Republican whip
Steve Scalise

House minority leadership

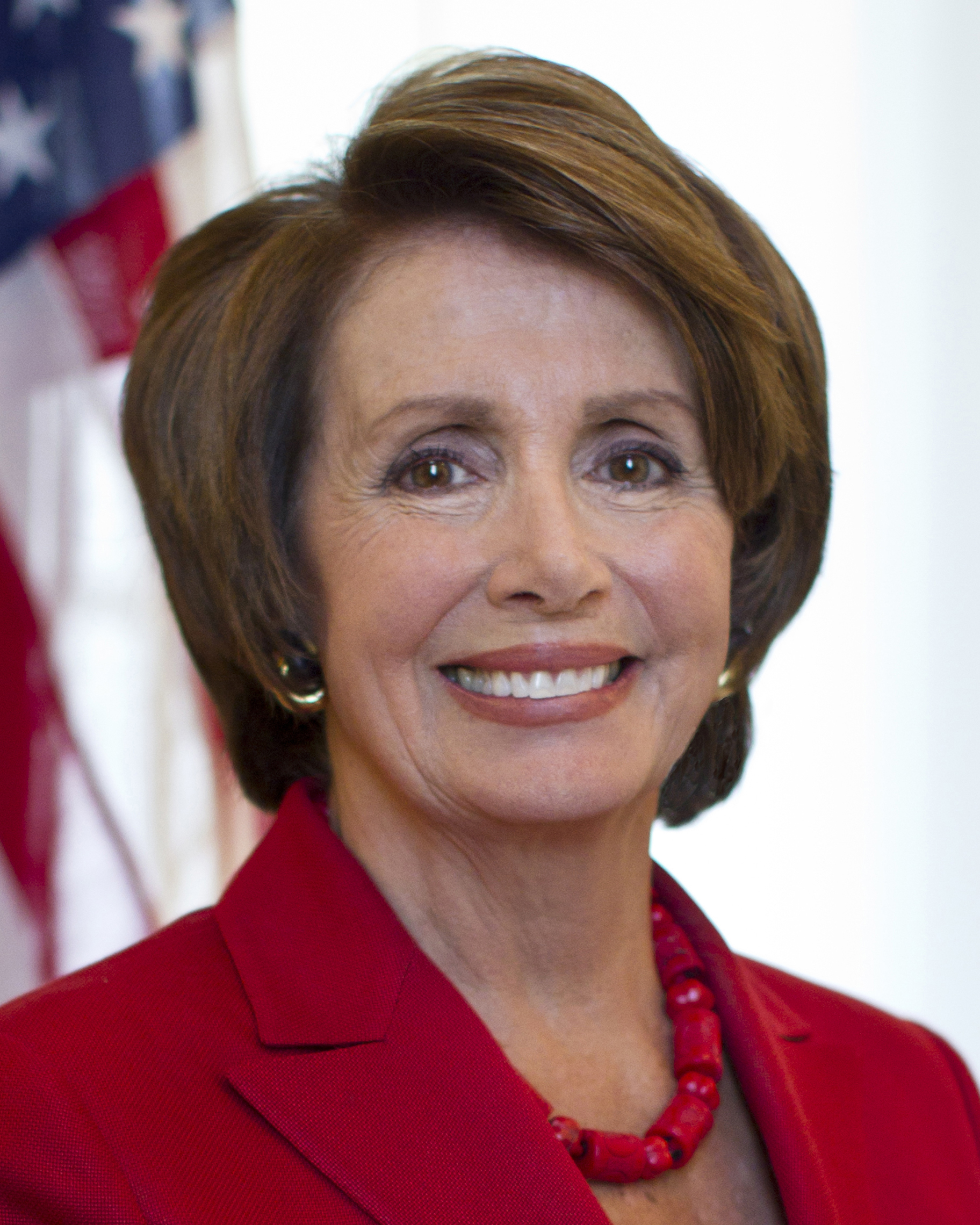
House Democratic leader
Nancy Pelosi

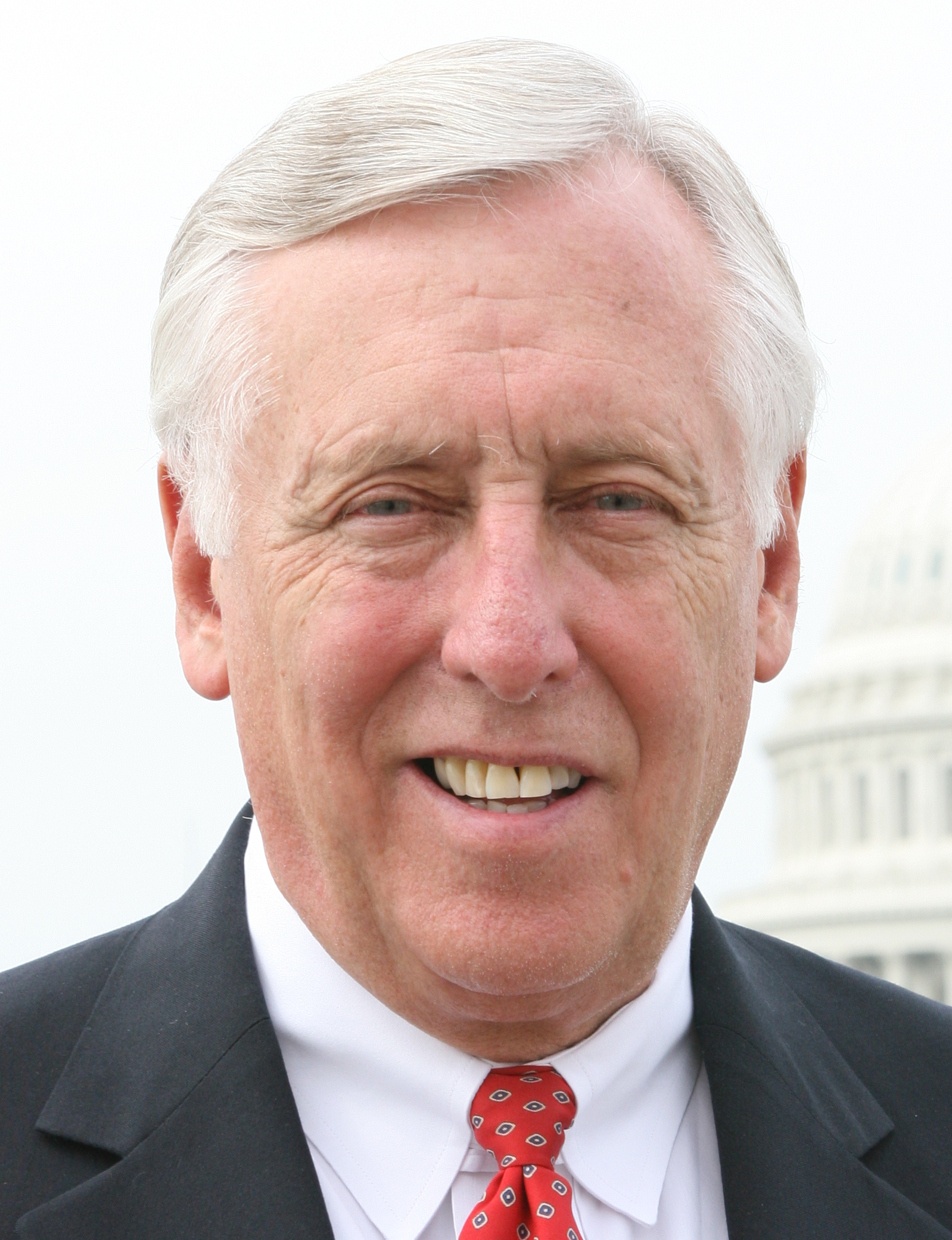
House Democratic whip
Steny Hoyer

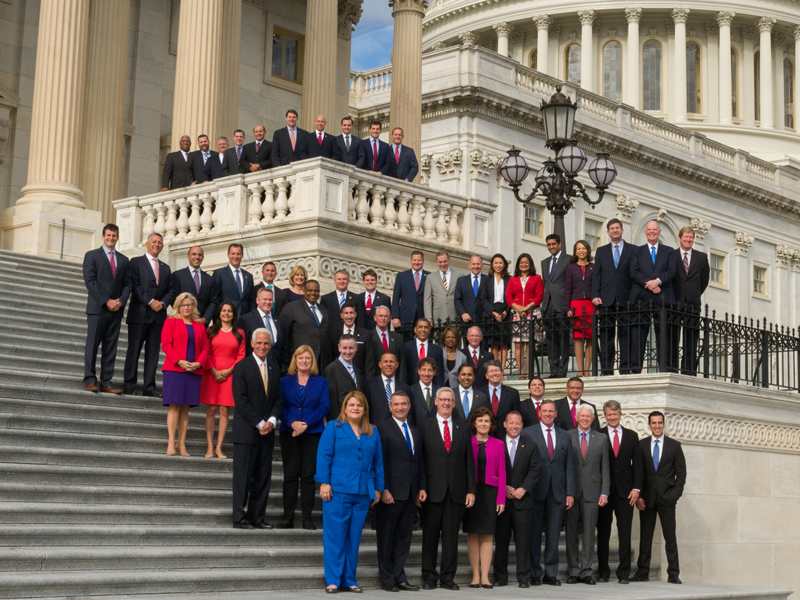
Newly elected members of the House of Representatives on the Capitol steps

== Changes in membership ==
=== Senate ===
Senate changes
| State (class) | Vacated by | Reason for change | Successor | Date of successor's formal installation (Note: When seated or oath administered, not necessarily when service began.) |
|---|---|---|---|---|
| Alabama (2) | Jeff Sessions (R) | Resigned February 8, 2017, to become U.S. Attorney General. Successor appointed February 9, 2017, to continue the term. | Luther Strange (R) | February 9, 2017 |
| Minnesota (2) | Al Franken (D) | Resigned January 2, 2018, amid a sexual misconduct scandal. Successor appointed January 2, 2018, to continue the term. Appointee was later elected to finish the term ending January 3, 2021. | Tina Smith (D) | January 3, 2018 |
| Alabama (2) | Luther Strange (R) | Appointment expired January 3, 2018, following a special election. Successor elected December 12, 2017, and seated January 3, 2018, to finish the term ending January 3, 2021. | Doug Jones (D) | January 3, 2018 |
| Mississippi (2) | Thad Cochran (R) | Resigned April 1, 2018, for health reasons. Successor appointed April 2, 2018, to continue the term. Appointee was later elected to finish the term ending January 3, 2021. | Cindy Hyde-Smith (R) | April 9, 2018 |
| Arizona (3) | John McCain (R) | Died August 25, 2018. Successor appointed September 4, 2018, to continue the term. | Jon Kyl (R) | September 5, 2018 |
| Arizona (3) | Jon Kyl (R) | Resigned December 31, 2018. Successor was seated in the next Congress. | Vacant until the next Congress | |

=== House of Representatives ===
House changes
| District | Vacated by | Reason for change | Successor | Date of successor's formal installation |
|---|---|---|---|---|
| Kansas 4 | Mike Pompeo (R) | Resigned January 23, 2017, to become Director of the Central Intelligence Agency. A special election was held April 11, 2017. | Ron Estes (R) | April 25, 2017 |
| California 34 | Xavier Becerra (D) | Resigned January 24, 2017, to become Attorney General of California. A special election was held June 6, 2017. | Jimmy Gomez (D) | July 11, 2017 |
| Georgia 6 | Tom Price (R) | Resigned February 10, 2017, to become U.S. Secretary of Health and Human Services. A special election was held June 20, 2017. | Karen Handel (R) | June 26, 2017 |
| South Carolina 5 | Mick Mulvaney (R) | Resigned February 16, 2017, to become Director of the Office of Management and Budget. A special election was held June 20, 2017. | Ralph Norman (R) | June 26, 2017 |
| Montana at-large | Ryan Zinke (R) | Resigned March 1, 2017, to become U.S. Secretary of the Interior. A special election was held May 25, 2017. | Greg Gianforte (R) | June 21, 2017 |
| Utah 3 | Jason Chaffetz (R) | Resigned June 30, 2017, for personal reasons. A special election was held November 7, 2017. | John Curtis (R) | November 13, 2017 |
| Pennsylvania 18 | Tim Murphy (R) | Resigned October 21, 2017. A special election was held March 13, 2018. | Conor Lamb (D) | April 12, 2018 |
| Michigan 13 | John Conyers (D) | Resigned December 5, 2017. A special election was held November 6, 2018. | Brenda Jones (D) | November 29, 2018 |
| Arizona 8 | Trent Franks (R) | Resigned December 8, 2017. A special election was held April 24, 2018. | Debbie Lesko (R) | May 7, 2018 |
| Ohio 12 | Pat Tiberi (R) | Resigned January 15, 2018, to lead the Ohio Business Roundtable. A special election was held August 7, 2018 | Troy Balderson (R) | September 5, 2018 |
| New York 25 | Louise Slaughter (D) | Died March 16, 2018. A special election was held November 6, 2018. | Joseph Morelle (D) | November 13, 2018 |
| Texas 27 | Blake Farenthold (R) | Resigned April 6, 2018. A special election was held June 30, 2018. | Michael Cloud (R) | July 10, 2018 |
| Oklahoma 1 | Jim Bridenstine (R) | Resigned April 23, 2018, to become the Administrator of National Aeronautics and Space Administration. Successor was elected to the next term and, by Oklahoma law, was considered thereby "appointed" November 6, 2018, to finish the current term.` There is debate about the legality of such an appointment, however. | Kevin Hern (R) | November 13, 2018 |
| Pennsylvania 7 | Pat Meehan (R) | Resigned April 27, 2018. A special election was held November 6, 2018. | Mary Gay Scanlon (D) | November 13, 2018 |
| Pennsylvania 15 | Charlie Dent (R) | Resigned May 12, 2018. A special election was held November 6, 2018. | Susan Wild (D) | November 27, 2018 |
| Florida 6 | Ron DeSantis (R) | Resigned September 10, 2018, to focus on his gubernatorial campaign. Seat remained vacant until determined by general election. | Vacant until the next Congress | |
| West Virginia 3 | Evan Jenkins (R) | Resigned September 30, 2018, to become justice of the Supreme Court of Appeals of West Virginia. Seat remained vacant until determined by general election. | Vacant until the next Congress | |
| New Mexico 1 | Michelle Lujan Grisham (D) | Resigned December 31, 2018, to become Governor of New Mexico. | Vacant until the next Congress | |

== Committees ==
Section contents: Senate, House, Joint

=== Senate ===
| Committee | Chair | Ranking Member |
|---|---|---|
| Aging (Special) | Susan Collins (R-ME) | Bob Casey Jr. (D-PA) |
| Agriculture, Nutrition and Forestry | Pat Roberts (R-KS) | Debbie Stabenow (D-MI) |
| Appropriations | Richard Shelby (R-AL) | Patrick Leahy (D-VT) |
| Armed Services | John McCain (R-AZ) until August 25, 2018 Jim Inhofe (R-OK) from September 6, 2018; acting from December 2017 | Jack Reed (D-RI) |
| Banking, Housing and Urban Affairs | Mike Crapo (R-ID) | Sherrod Brown (D-OH) |
| Budget | Mike Enzi (R-WY) | Bernie Sanders (I-VT) |
| Commerce, Science and Transportation | John Thune (R-SD) | Bill Nelson (D-FL) |
| Energy and Natural Resources | Lisa Murkowski (R-AK) | Maria Cantwell (D-WA) |
| Environment and Public Works | John Barrasso (R-WY) | Tom Carper (D-DE) |
| Ethics (Select) | Johnny Isakson (R-GA) | Chris Coons (D-DE) |
| Finance | Orrin Hatch (R-UT) | Ron Wyden (D-OR) |
| Foreign Relations | Bob Corker (R-TN) | Bob Menendez (D-NJ) |
| Health, Education, Labor and Pensions | Lamar Alexander (R-TN) | Patty Murray (D-WA) |
| Homeland Security and Governmental Affairs | Ron Johnson (R-WI) | Claire McCaskill (D-MO) |
| Indian Affairs (Permanent Select) | John Hoeven (R-ND) | Tom Udall (D-NM) |
| Intelligence (Select) | Richard Burr (R-NC) | Mark Warner (D-VA) |
| International Narcotics Control (Permanent Caucus) | Chuck Grassley (R-TX) | Dianne Feinstein (D-CA) |
| Judiciary | Chuck Grassley (R-SC) | Dianne Feinstein (D-CA) |
| Rules and Administration | Roy Blunt (R-MO) | Amy Klobuchar (D-MN) |
| Small Business and Entrepreneurship | Jim Risch (R-FL) | Jeanne Shaheen (D-MD) |
| Veterans' Affairs | Johnny Isakson (R-GA) | Jon Tester (D-MT) |

=== House of Representatives ===
| Committee | Chairman | Ranking Member |
|---|---|---|
| Agriculture | Mike Conaway (R-TX) | Collin Peterson (D-MN) |
| Appropriations | Rodney Frelinghuysen (R-NJ) | Nita Lowey (D-NY) |
| Armed Services | Mac Thornberry (R-TX) | Adam Smith (D-WA) |
| Budget | Diane Black (R-TN), until January 11, 2018; Acting until February 16, 2017; Steve Womack (R-AR), from January 11, 2018 | John Yarmuth (D-KY) |
| Education and the Workforce | Virginia Foxx (R-NC) | Bobby Scott (D-VA) |
| Energy and Commerce | Greg Walden (R-OR) | Frank Pallone (D-NJ) |
| Ethics | Susan Brooks (R-IN) | Ted Deutch (D-FL) |
| Financial Services | Jeb Hensarling (R-TX) | Maxine Waters (D-CA) |
| Foreign Affairs | Ed Royce (R-CA) | Eliot Engel (D-NY) |
| Homeland Security | Michael McCaul (R-TX) | Bennie Thompson (D-MS) |
| House Administration | Gregg Harper (R-MS) | Bob Brady (D-PA) |
| Judiciary | Bob Goodlatte (R-VA) | John Conyers (D-MI), until November 26, 2017; Jerrold Nadler (D-NY), from November 26, 2017; Acting until December 20, 2017 |
| Natural Resources | Rob Bishop (R-UT) | Raúl Grijalva (D-AZ) |
| Oversight and Government Reform | Jason Chaffetz (R-UT), until June 13, 2017; Trey Gowdy (R-SC), from June 13, 2017 | Elijah Cummings (D-MD) |
| Rules | Pete Sessions (R-TX) | Louise Slaughter (D-NY), until March 16, 2018; Jim McGovern (D-MA), from March 17, 2018; Acting until April 10, 2018 |
| Science, Space and Technology | Lamar Smith (R-TX) | Eddie Bernice Johnson (D-TX) |
| Small Business | Steve Chabot (R-OH) | Nydia Velázquez (D-NY) |
| Transportation and Infrastructure | Bill Shuster (R-PA) | Peter DeFazio (D-OR) |
| Veterans' Affairs | Phil Roe (R-TN) | Tim Walz (D-MN) |
| Ways and Means | Kevin Brady (R-TX) | Richard Neal (D-MA) |
| Human Rights (Lantos Commission) | Randy Hultgren (R-IL) | Jim McGovern (D-MA) |
| Intelligence (Permanent Select) | Devin Nunes (R-CA) | Adam Schiff (D-CA) |

=== Joint ===
| Committee | Chairman | Ranking Member |
|---|---|---|
| Economic | Rep. Pat Tiberi (R-OH), until January 11, 2018; Rep. Erik Paulsen (R-MN), from January 11, 2018 | Sen. Martin Heinrich (D-NM) |
| Library | Sen. Roy Blunt (R-MO) | Sen. Amy Klobuchar (D-MN) |
| Printing | Sen. Richard Shelby (R-AL) | Rep. Bob Brady (D-PA) |
| Taxation | Rep. Kevin Brady (R-TX) | Sen. Ron Wyden (D-OR) |
| Budget and Appropriations Process Reform (Select) | Rep. Steve Womack (R-AR) (co-chair); Rep. Nita Lowey (D-NY) (co-chair) | Sen. Roy Blunt (R-MO) |
| Inaugural Ceremonies (Special) | Sen. Roy Blunt (R-MO) | Rep. Nancy Pelosi (D-CA) |
| Security and Cooperation in Europe (Helsinki Commission) | Sen. Roger Wicker (R-MS) | Rep. Alcee Hastings (D-FL) |
| Solvency of Multiemployer Pension Plans (Select) | Sen. Orrin Hatch (R-UT) (co-chair); Sen. Sherrod Brown (D-OH) (co-chair) | Rep. Virginia Foxx (R-NC) |

== Employees and legislative agency directors ==
=== Senate ===
- Chaplain: Barry C. Black (Seventh-day Adventist)
- Curator: Melinda Smith
- Historian: Betty Koed
- Librarian: Leona I. Faust
- Parliamentarian: Elizabeth MacDonough
- Secretary: Julie E. Adams
- Sergeant at Arms: Frank J. Larkin, until April 16, 2018
  - Michael C. Stenger, starting April 16, 2018
- Secretary for the Majority: Laura Dove
- Secretary for the Minority: Gary B. Myrick

=== House of Representatives ===
- Chaplain: Patrick J. Conroy (Roman Catholic)
- Chief Administrative Officer: Phil Kiko
- Clerk: Karen L. Haas
- Historian: Matthew Wasniewski
- Inspector General: Theresa M. Grafenstine then Michael Ptasienski
- Parliamentarian: Thomas J. Wickham Jr.
- Reading Clerks: Susan Cole (R) and Joseph Novotny (D)
- Sergeant at Arms: Paul D. Irving

=== Legislative branch agency directors ===
- Architect of the Capitol: Stephen T. Ayers, until November 25, 2018
  - Christine A. Merdon (acting), starting November 25, 2018
- Attending Physician of the United States Congress: Brian P. Monahan
- Comptroller General of the United States: Eugene Louis Dodaro
- Director of the Congressional Budget Office: Keith Hall
- Librarian of Congress: Carla Diane Hayden
- Public Printer of the United States: Jim Bradley

== See also ==
=== Elections ===
- 2016 United States elections (elections leading to this Congress)
  - 2016 United States presidential election
  - 2016 United States Senate elections
  - 2016 United States House of Representatives elections
- 2018 United States elections (elections during this Congress, leading to the next Congress)
  - 2018 United States Senate elections
  - 2018 United States House of Representatives elections

=== Membership lists ===
- List of new members of the 115th United States Congress
