= Financial CHOICE Act =

Bill of the 115th U.S. Congress

Financial CHOICE Act (H.R. 10) is a bill introduced to the 115th United States Congress in 2017 that would, if enacted, roll back many of the protections in the landmark Dodd-Frank 2010 federal law, including the "strongest" Wall Street regulations from the 2008 financial crisis. The legislation passed the House 233–186 on June 8, 2017. The 600-page legislation was crafted by Congressman Jeb Hensarling (R-TX), chair of the House Financial Services Committee.

== Timeline ==
The bill passed the Republican-led House on June 8, 2017 along party lines. The next stage is in the Senate where, under the leadership of chairman Mike Crapo (R-ID), they are taking a "bipartisan approach" to craft their own "regulatory relief bill for Wall Street and community banks" that would be able to "clear a 60-vote threshold". Crapo is working closely with Senator Sherrod Brown (D), the "top Democrat on the panel".

== Dodd-Frank ==
The 2010 Dodd-Frank reform financial regulatory legislation was enacted during the Obama administration in response to the 2008 financial crisis. It amended the Commodity Exchange Act, the Consumer Credit Protection Act, the Federal Deposit Insurance Act, the Federal Deposit Insurance Corporation Improvement Act of 1991, the Federal Reserve Act, the Financial Institutions Reform, Recovery, and Enforcement Act of 1989, the International Banking Act of 1978, the Protecting Tenants at Foreclosure Act, the Revised Statutes of the United States, the Securities Exchange Act of 1934, and the Truth in Lending Act.

== Proposed legislative reforms ==
The legislation aims to undo many key provisions of the 2010 Dodd–Frank Act. If the legislation is passed, the president would have the power to fire directors of the Federal Housing Finance Agency (FHFA) "which oversees mortgage giants Fannie Mae and Freddie Mac", and the Consumer Financial Protection Bureau (CFPB). (The CFPB, an agency responsible for protecting consumers in the financial sector was created by Dodd-Frank.) It would also give "Congress purview over the CFPB's budget, meaning lawmakers could defund the agency entirely". The law, if enacted, would also prohibit the CFPB from regulating small-dollar credit or restricting arbitration, being responsible for supervision of banks and other financial institutions as well as market monitoring. The CFPB will no longer have the authority to prohibit Unfair, Deceptive, or Abusive Acts or Practices and will be limited to enforcement actions and rules derived directly from consumer protection laws.

Dodd-Frank's Orderly Liquidation Authority, "which allows the federal government to step in if a bank is near collapse to provide a backstop to ensure the institution's failure would not spread to the rest of financial system", would be eliminated.

The bill also includes proposals requiring the Federal Reserve Bank to adhere to mathematical rules for setting monetary policy (particularly federal funds rate targeting), based on the Taylor Rule. Critics of the Taylor Rule have argued that its adoption following the 2008 financial crisis would have resulted in negative interest rates.

== Response from Republicans ==
Paul Ryan said, "We see the Financial Choice Act as the crown jewel of this effort. The Dodd-Frank Act has had a lot of bad consequences for our economy, but most of all in the small communities across our country." "The CHOICE Act reins in Dodd-Frank and delivers the regulatory relief these banks so desperately need...This will change our communities, because these small banks are the lifeblood of our Main Streets."

== Response from Democrats ==
Democrats expressed concern that the legislation "would remove some of the most vital protections that were included in the Dodd-Frank Act to prevent something like the financial crisis from happening again". House Minority Leader Nancy Pelosi criticized the House Republicans' "dangerous Wall Street-first" bill, saying it would "drag us back to the days of the Great Recession". Senator Elizabeth Warren called it a "handout to Wall Street."
