= Strengthening State and Local Cyber Crime Fighting Act of 2017 =

- Long title: To amend the Homeland Security Act of 2002 to authorize the National Computer Forensics Institute, and for other purposes.
- Announced in: the 115th United States Congress
- Sponsored by: U.S. Rep. John Ratcliffe (R-TX)
- Number of co-sponsors: 18

Citations
- Public law: Pub. L. 115–76 (text) (PDF)

Legislative history
- Introduced in the House as H.R. 1616 by John Ratcliffe (R–TX) on March 17, 2017; Passed the House on 5/16/17 (408-3); Passed the Senate on 10/02/17 (Voice Vote) with amendment; House agreed to Senate amendment on 10/12/17 (Unanimous Consent); Signed into law by President Donald Trump on 11/02/17

The Strengthening State and Local Cyber Crime Fighting Act of 2017 (H.R. 1616) is a bill introduced in the United States House of Representatives by U.S. Representative John Ratcliffe (R-Texas). The bill would amend the Homeland Security Act of 2002 to authorize the National Computer Forensics Institute, with the intent of providing local and state officials with resources to better handle cybercrime threats. Ratcliffe serves as the current chairman of the House Homeland Security Subcommittee on Cybersecurity and Infrastructure Protection.

The bill was passed by the House with a roll call vote of 408-3 after forty minutes of debate. Between its introduction and approval, the bill was referred to the Committee on the Judiciary, the Committee on Homeland Security, the Subcommittee on Transportation and Protective Security, and the Subcommittee on Crime, Terrorism, Homeland Security, and Investigations.

The bill has a total of 18 cosponsors, including 17 Republicans and one Democrat.

Ratcliffe introduced the bill because he believes that local and state level law enforcement entities should be better equipped to handle emerging cyber threats in order to protect communities. He expressed concern that in today's world, traditional evidence of crimes, like DNA samples, might not be enough to solve cases, because criminals are more frequently breaking the law and leaving behind traces on the internet. In March 2017, Ratcliffe said, "Cyber elements add layers of complexity to the crimes our local law enforcement officers face every day ‒ and we've got to make sure they have access to the training they need to address this trend."

As of July 2017, the Senate has not yet considered the bill, although Senators Chuck Grassley (R-Iowa), Dianne Feinstein (D-California), Richard Shelby (R-Alabama), Sheldon Whitehouse (D-Rhode Island), and Luther Strange (R-Alabama) introduced a companion bill.

Senator Grassley, current Senate Judiciary Committee Chairman, supported the role of the National Computer Forensics Institute and the purpose of Ratcliffe's bill, saying the center gives officials the capacity to "dust for 'digital fingerprints' and utilize forensics to gather evidence and solve cases."

== Background ==
Seal of the United States Department of Homeland Security

As the internet has grown increasingly dominant in communications, business, and daily life, cybercrime has become a more dangerous threat to privacy and safety of both public and private entities. Americans recognize this issue, as they identified cyberattacks as the second most concerning global threat to the nation in a May 2016 survey conducted by Pew Research.

The federal government has fallen victim to cyber attacks numerous times, especially in recent years. A 2016 report from the Government Accountability Office that included a survey of two dozen federal agencies found that cyberattacks exploded in frequency by 1,300 percent over the course of a decade, with 5,500 in 2006 to as many as 77,000 in 2015. The report listed eighteen of the agencies as operators of "high-impact systems", meaning that leaks could cause "catastrophic harm" to particular individuals, the government, or the general public.

In May 2015, hackers accessed tax returns of over 300,000 people during an attack on the Internal Revenue Service, which led to the distribution of over $50 million in fraudulent refunds. Since 2007, federal agencies have dealt with at least a dozen attacks on their systems. Social Security information, home addresses, health records, and other personal data has been stolen from millions of people, including elected officials.

Hackers from foreign countries have played a significant role in cyber attacks against the United States. The FBI, CIA, NSA and the Office of the Director of National Intelligence agreed that Russian hackers were behind an infiltration of the Democratic National Committee's data during the 2016 United States presidential election.

NBC News obtained a document from the National Security Agency that detailed a five-year period of Chinese hacking of government information, which ended in 2014.

Private groups and businesses have also been damaged by cybercrime. Cyberattacks cost American companies more than $15 million per year. The United States loses 500,000 jobs on an annual basis due to cyberattacks. More than 50 percent of all cyberattacks are launched against American companies, leading to a loss of $100 billion in the economy each year. A Citibank ATM server attack in 2008 lead to the loss of $2 million, and a Sony hack in 2014 lead to the loss of $15 million. In 2014 alone, 44% of all small businesses in the United States were attacked, which resulted in affected companies losing an average of $8,700 each.

Ratcliffe and supporters of the bill aim to better equip all levels of the government to handle the increasing cyber threats that challenge both the government and American businesses and private citizens. U.S. Representative Dan Donovan (R-NY), who voted in favor of the bill, said, "It's critical that our law enforcement agencies have the information and training they need to respond to threats. This legislation will help increase coordination between the brave men and women who defend us on the local, state, and federal level and ensure that they have the tools needed to protect the homeland."

The National Computer Forensics Institute has proven vital in this effort, having already worked with over 6,250 officials coming from all 50 states and even three United States territories.

Representative Bob Goodlatte (R-VA), House Judiciary Committee chairman, said the NCFI would benefit from a clear congressional mandate. "Authorizing the existing National Computer Forensics Institute in federal law will cement its position as our nation's premier hi-tech cyber crime training facility."

== Major provisions ==
The objective of the bill is to authorize the National Computer Forensics Institute so that the center can "disseminate homeland security information related to the investigation and prevention of cyber and electronic crime and related threats, and educate, train, and equip State, local, tribal, and territorial law enforcement officers, prosecutors, and judges." The bill aims to achieve this through amending the Homeland Security Act of 2002.

While the National Computer Forensics Institute, based in Hoover, Alabama, has been open since 2008, the bill would ensure proper oversight and accountability, solidifying the center's position as the optimal site for training law enforcement to mitigate cyber threats.

The bill establishes that the operations of the National Computer Forensics Institute are to:

- Educate law enforcement officers at all levels of government, including local, state, territorial, and tribal forces on threats related to cybercrime.
- Instruct law enforcement personnel, about proper investigation methods, device examination techniques, and potential prosecutorial and judicial challenges.
- Train law enforcement officers to carry out investigations and respond in a necessary manner to reported incidents of cybercrime.
- Facilitate the sharing of information between State, local, tribal and territorial officers and prosecutors.
- Provide materials like hardware, software, manuals, tools, and other items to law enforcement to conduct investigations.
- Expand the Electronic Crime Task Forces of the United States Secret Service through continuous training of officers.

The NCFI would continue to be operated by the U.S. Secret Service, within the Department of Homeland Security. The network of Electronic Crime Task Forces would include stakeholders from academic institutions and the private sector under the expansion sanctioned by the authorization of the NCFI.

== Legislative history ==
During the 114th Congress, an earlier version of the bill was passed in the U.S. House on November 30, 2015. On December 1, 2015, the bill was received in the Senate and referred to the Committee on the Judiciary. No further action was taken.

On March 17, 2017, Ratcliffe introduced the bill in the House. After introduction:

- 3/17/17 - Referred to the Committee on the Judiciary and Committee on Homeland Security.
- 3/29/17 - Referred to the Subcommittee on Transportation and Protective Security by the Committee on Homeland Security.
- 3/31/17 - Referred to the Subcommittee on Crime, Terrorism, Homeland Security, and Investigations by the Committee on the Judiciary.
- 5/16/17 - The House passed the bill on motion to suspend the rules and pass the bill as amended with a vote of 403 Yeas and 8 Nays.
- 5/17/17 - The Senate received the bill, read it twice, and referred it to the Committee on the Judiciary.

== See also ==
- Cybercrime
- Homeland security
