= United States Congressional Joint Select Committee on Solvency of Multiemployer Pension Plans =

The Joint Select Committee on Solvency of Multiemployer Pension Plans was established on February 9, 2018, during the 115th United States Congress under Section 30422 of H.R. 1892.

== Members, 115th Congress ==
	Majority	Minority
Senate members	Orrin Hatch, Utah, Co-Chair; Lamar Alexander, Tennessee; Mike Crapo, Idaho; Rob Portman, Ohio	Sherrod Brown, Ohio, Co-Chair; Joe Manchin, West Virginia; Heidi Heitkamp, North Dakota; Tina Smith, Minnesota
House members	Virginia Foxx, North Carolina; Phil Roe, Tennessee; Vern Buchanan, Florida; David Schweikert, Arizona	Richard Neal, Massachusetts; Bobby Scott, Virginia; Donald Norcross, New Jersey; Debbie Dingell, Michigan

== Sources ==
- http://www.pionline.com/article/20180228/ONLINE/180229842/senate-republicans-named-to-congressional-multiemployer-pension-committee
- http://www.pionline.com/article/20180226/ONLINE/180229873/senate-democrats-named-to-multiemployer-committee
- http://www.pionline.com/article/20180223/ONLINE/180229916/house-members-appointed-to-multiemployer-panel
