= Elder Abuse Prevention and Prosecution Act of 2017 =

American law

On October 18. 2017, President Trump signed into law the Elder Abuse Prevention and Prosecution Act of 2017 (P.L. 115–70), identifying the need for data on elder abuse. Elder abuse cases have many stages from the incident through investigation (by adult protective services or law enforcement), prosecution, and trauma recovery. Several federal agencies currently collect elder abuse data (including physical abuse, neglect, and financial exploitation) on an ongoing basis at different points in the process.

The Act increases the federal government's focus on preventing elder abuse and exploitation by creating a multi-pronged approach for protecting older adults by punishing perpetrators who exploit, abuse, and harm vulnerable seniors.

On World Elder Abuse Awareness Day 2021, the Biden administration committed to ensuring that older Americans have greater opportunities to live with dignity, safety, independence, and social connections, by including more than $1.4 billion in additional funding in the American Rescue Plan for programs that promote community living and ensure the safety and protection of older adults. The law also enhances the Elder Justice Act and ensures that Adult Protective Services can be used to protect the safety and dignity of all seniors.

== Background ==
Elderly abuse is a complex issue that requires a multifaceted policy response combining public health interventions, social services programs, and law enforcement.

Currently, elder abuse is viewed through the lens of four distinct federal data sets:

- National Adult Mistreatment Report System (NAMRS) collects state-level adult protective services data
- National Incident-Based Reporting System (NIBRS) collects state-level law enforcement data
- FTC Consumer Sentinel Network collects consumer complaints from multiple sources
- Financial Crimes Enforcement Network (FinCEN) collects data on suspected elder financial exploitation submitted by financial institutions

The Department of Justice provides the purpose and scope of each of the above.

== History ==
The bill (S. 178) was first introduced in the Senate on January 20, 2017, to prevent elder abuse and exploitation and improve the justice system's response to victims in elder abuse and exploitation cases.

World Elder Abuse Awareness Day (WEAAD) was launched on June 15, 2006, by the International Network for the Prevention of Elder Abuse and the World Health Organization at the United Nations. The purpose of WEAAD is to provide an opportunity for communities around the world to promote a better understanding of abuse and neglect of older persons by raising awareness of the cultural, social, economic and demographic processes affecting elder abuse and neglect. In addition, WEAAD is in support of the United Nations International Plan of Action acknowledging the significance of elder abuse as a public health and human rights issue. WEAAD serves as a call-to-action for individuals, organizations, and communities to raise awareness about elder abuse, neglect, and exploitation.

Early enactments to address elder abuse go as far back as 1979 when:

- Congress amended the Social Security Act in 1974 requiring all states to establish adult protective services units (APS) for adults aged 18 and older.
- The U.S. House of Representatives held hearings and sponsored investigations about elder abuse throughout the middle to late 1970s.
- "Caregiver stress" was thought to be the primary cause of elder abuse. As a result, models that relied upon recognition and reporting of elder abuse by health care providers were developed to identify and help victims. Helping victims often involved removing them from their home and placing them in a nursing home.

The American Bar Association outlines these and other significant events that led to the Elder Abuse Prevention and Prosecution Act.

== Abuse in Cyberspace ==
The elderly are increasingly victims of cybercrime. The FBI Phoenix Field Office released a report on June 15, 2019, coinciding with the WEAAD, pointing out that residents over the age of 60 made up most of the cybercrime victims in Arizona in 2018 and accounted for most adjusted losses that year. Like most others, the elderly use online services to conduct transactions with banks and mortgage companies and consult with healthcare providers over Internet-based tele-health services – involving a wealth of financial, personal, and other sensitive information. According to the FBI, these cyber crimes cost the elderly about $1.8 billion in 2020.

The Census Bureau projects that by 2045, 20% of the U.S. population will be over 65. Surveys have shown that criminals are transitioning from traditional crimes to this more lucrative and ever-expanding cyberattack surface using very innovative and sophisticated methods to create or exploit socio-behavioral and technological vulnerabilities in cyber users and cyberspace, respectively. After the Elder Abuse Prevention and Prosecution Act was passed, the Department of Justice announced the Elder Justice Initiative – "to support and coordinate the Department's enforcement and programmatic efforts to combat elder abuse, neglect and financial fraud and scams that target our nation's seniors."^{1} New policy must empower law enforcement with the ways and means to take swift action to track down and prosecute cybercriminals.

The challenges to securing cyberspace for the elderly are multifaceted, requiring policies covering multiple disciplines and domains. Policies must empower and enable law enforcement to effectively track down and prosecute criminals. The Elder Abuse Prevention and Prosecution Act promotes the investigation and prosecution of "perpetrators who prey upon seniors, enhanced data collection, and robust elder abuse prevention programs. It calls for the designation of at least one Assistant United States Attorney to serve as Elder Justice Coordinator in each Federal judicial district. The legislation ensures that FBI agents will receive training on the investigation of elder abuse cases. DOJ would have to establish an elder abuse resource group to facilitate information sharing among Federal prosecutors and, more broadly, to support the prosecution of elder abuse cases.
