= Elie Wiesel Genocide and Atrocities Prevention Act =

US government bill

Elie Wiesel Genocide and Atrocities Prevention Act of 2018
- Long title: To help prevent acts of genocide and other atrocity crimes, which threaten national and international security, by enhancing United States Government capacities to prevent, mitigate, and respond to such crises.

Citations
- Public law: Pub. L. 115–441 (text) (PDF)

Legislative history
- Introduced in the Senate by Benjamin Cardin (D‑MD) on May 17, 2017; Passed the Senate on Dec. 12, 2018 (by Unanimous consent); Passed the House on Dec. 21, 2018 (367-4); Signed into law by President Donald Trump on Jan. 14, 2019

The Elie Wiesel Genocide and Atrocities Prevention Act of 2018, also known as the Elie Wiesel Act, GAPA or EWGAPA (Pub. L. 115–441 (text) (PDF)), is part of the 115th Congress, being S.1158 in the Senate and HR.3030 in the House. It was introduced in June 2017 and passed on December 21, 2018.

According to the Congressional Research Service, this law directs the U.S. Department of State to provide additional training for Foreign Service Officers assigned to a country experiencing or at risk of mass atrocities, such as genocide or war crimes. The training shall include instruction on recognizing patterns of escalation and early signs of potential atrocities, and methods of preventing and responding to atrocities. The President shall report annually to Congress on U.S. efforts to prevent mass atrocities.
