= First 100 days of the first Trump presidency =

Period from January to April 2017

- Part of the first presidency of Donald Trump
- Date: January 20, 2017 – April 30, 2017

Trump outlines his plan for the first 100 days of his first presidency, November 21, 2016

The first 100 days of the first Trump presidency began on January 20, 2017, the day Donald Trump was inaugurated as the 45th president of the United States. The first 100 days of a presidency took on symbolic significance during Franklin D. Roosevelt's first term in office, and the period is considered a benchmark to measure the early success of a president. The 100th day of Trump's first presidency was April 30, 2017.

Institutionally, President Trump had the advantage of a Republican Party majority in the U.S. House of Representatives and the Senate, but was unable to fulfill his major pledges in his first 100 days, with some approval rating polls reporting around 40%. He reversed his position on a number of issues including labeling China as a currency manipulator, NATO, launching the 2017 Shayrat missile strike, renomination of Janet Yellen as Chair of the Federal Reserve, and the nomination of Export-Import Bank directors. Trump's approval among his base was high, with 96% of those who voted for him saying in an April 2017 poll that they would vote for him again. Near the end of the 100 days, the Trump administration introduced a broad outline of a sweeping tax reform focusing on deep tax cuts. Although Trump had to concede to delay funding for the U.S.–Mexico border wall he had promised, narrowly avoiding a government shutdown a few days before the end of the first 100 days.

Trump signed 24 executive orders in his first 100 days. He signed 22 presidential memoranda, 20 presidential proclamations, and 28 bills. About a dozen of those bills roll-back regulations finalized during the last months of his immediate predecessor Barack Obama's presidency using the Congressional Review Act. Most of the other bills are "small-scale measures that appoint personnel, name federal facilities or modify existing programs." None of Trump's bills are considered to be "major bills"—based on a "longstanding political-science standard for 'major bills'". Presidential historian Michael Beschloss said that "based on a legislative standard"—which is what the first 100 days has been judged on since the tenure of President Franklin D. Roosevelt, who enacted 76 laws in 100 days including nine that were "major".

== Pledges ==
Trump pledged to do the following in the first 100 days of his first presidency:

- Appoint judges who will "uphold the Constitution" and "defend the Second Amendment"
- Construct a wall on the southern U.S. border and limit illegal immigration "to give unemployed Americans an opportunity to fill good-paying jobs"
- Reassess trade agreements with other nations and "crack down" on companies that send jobs overseas

The Affordable Care Act (Obamacare)

- Repeal and replace the Patient Protection and Affordable Care Act (commonly called the Affordable Care Act or Obamacare)
- Remove federal restrictions on energy production
- Push for an amendment to the United States Constitution imposing term limits on Congress
- Eliminate gun-free zones
- Formulate a rule on regulations "that for every one new regulation, two old regulations must be eliminated"
- Instruct the chairman of the Joint Chiefs of Staff to "develop a comprehensive plan to protect America's vital infrastructure from cyberattacks, and all other form of attacks"
- Label China a "currency manipulator"
- Enforce rules and regulations for China's unfair subsidy behavior, instructing the U.S. trade representative to bring trade cases against China, both in U.S. and at the WTO
- Use every lawful presidential power to remedy trade disputes, including the application of 45% tariffs consistent with Section 201 and 301 of the Trade Act of 1974 and Section 232 of the Trade Expansion Act of 1962, to stop China's illegal activities, including its theft of American trade secrets

== Inauguration ==
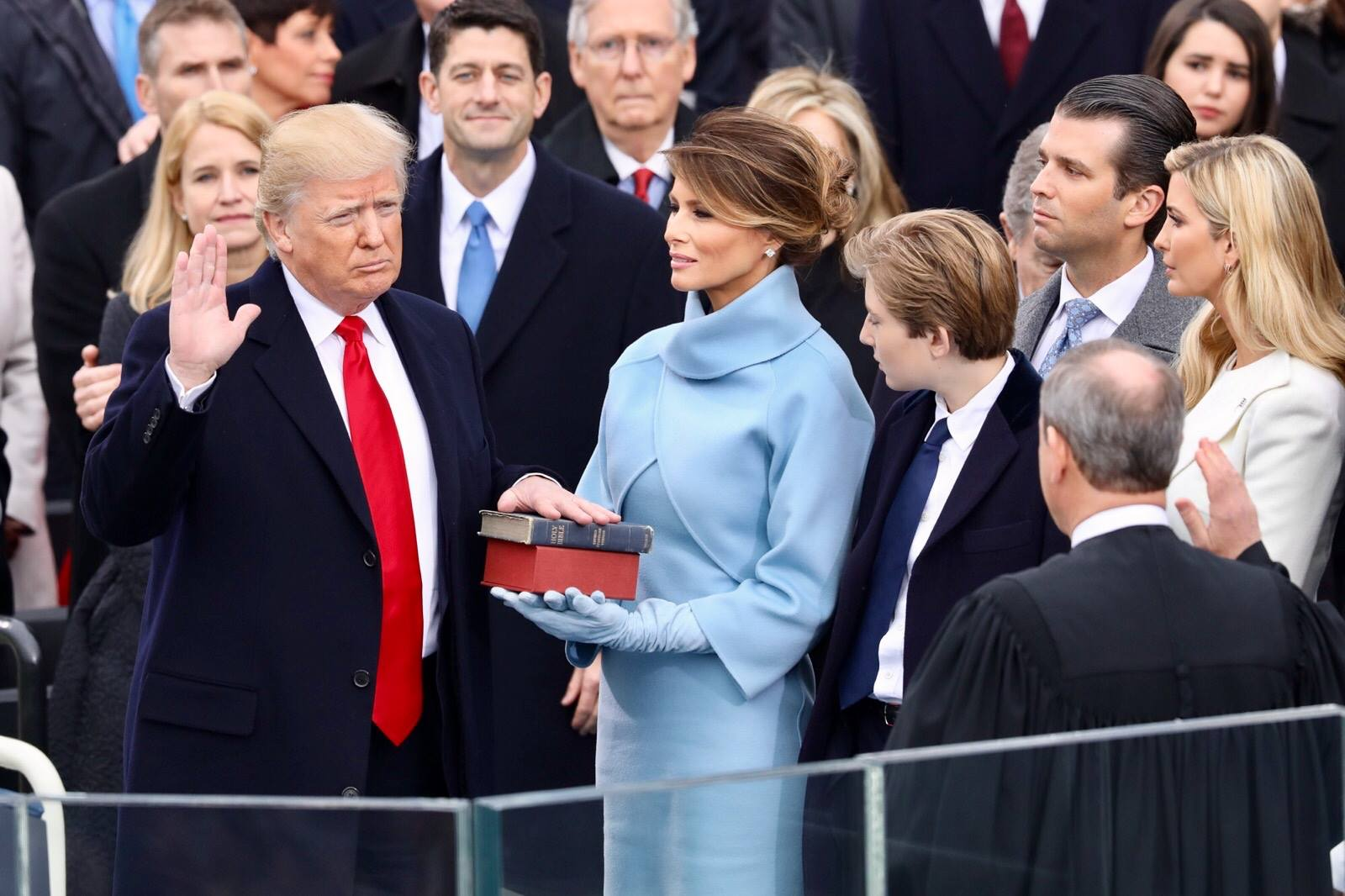
Trump takes his first oath of office, administered by Chief Justice John Roberts at the Capitol.

Trump delivers his 2017 inaugural address.

The first inauguration of Donald Trump was the 58th presidential inauguration and it marked the completion of Trump's first presidential transition which began the morning of November 9, 2016 after his victory in the 2016 presidential election and concluded at noon of January 20, 2017. Donald Trump and Mike Pence were formally inaugurated as the 45th President and 48th Vice President of the United States at noon on January 20, 2017, at the Capitol, marking the start of the first 100 days of the First Trump presidency.

=== Presidential Communications ===
The content of Whitehouse.gov was switched from the Obama Administration version to the First Trump Administration version, while the prior was archived as ObamaWhiteHouse This was the third time the presidential website had switched between administrations and the first time switching control of social media accounts such as Twitter. As Trump took the oath of office, the official @POTUS Twitter account switched to President Trump and Barack Obama's previous tweets were moved to @POTUS44Archive. Members of the First Trump administration assumed control of numerous social media accounts while former Obama Administration accounts were similarly archived such as Melania Trump assuming @FLOTUS, Mike Pence assuming @VP, Karen Pence assuming @SLOTUS, Sean Spicer assuming @PressSec, along with others. Trump's cabinet members were given new social media accounts as previous administrations had done and new executive branch websites were created while previous administration websites reside in the National Archives.

== Administration and Cabinet ==
On February 8, when Trump formally announced his 24-member-cabinet—the largest cabinet of any President so far—fewer cabinet nominees had been confirmed than any other president except George Washington by the same length of time into his presidency. Trump's reorganization of the cabinet removed the Chair of the Council of Economic Advisers that President Obama had added in 2009. The Director of National Intelligence and Director of the CIA were elevated to cabinet-level. During the transition period, Trump had named a full slate of Cabinet and Cabinet-level nominees, all of which require Senate confirmation except for White House Chief of Staff and the vice presidency.

By April 29, almost all of his nominated cabinet members had been confirmed, including Secretaries of State Rex Tillerson, Treasury Steven Mnuchin, Defense James Mattis, Justice Jeff Sessions, the Interior Ryan Zinke, Secretary of Agriculture Sonny Perdue, Commerce Wilbur Ross, Secretary of Labor Alex Acosta, Health and Human Services Tom Price, Housing and Urban Development Ben Carson, Transportation Elaine Chao, Energy Rick Perry, Education Betsy DeVos, Veterans Affairs David Shulkin, Homeland Security John Kelly, Director of the Central Intelligence Agency Mike Pompeo, UN Ambassador Nikki R. Haley, Environmental Protection Agency Scott Pruitt, Small Business Administration Linda McMahon, Management and Budget Mick Mulvaney, and Director of National Intelligence Dan Coats. Only two were awaiting confirmation — Trade Representative Robert Lighthizer and Council of Economic Advisers Kevin Hassett.

James Mattis was confirmed on January 20 as Secretary of Defense by a vote of 98–1. Mattis had previously received a waiver of the National Security Act of 1947, which requires a seven-year waiting period before retired military personnel can assume the role of Secretary of Defense. John Kelly was confirmed as United States Secretary of Homeland Security on the first day by a vote of 88–11. Former ExxonMobil CEO Rex Tillerson was sworn in as Secretary of State by Vice-President Mike Pence on February 1. Trump nominated Tillerson for the position as top U.S. diplomat (the equivalent of a foreign minister) on December 13, 2016. He was approved by the Senate Foreign Relations Committee on January 23, 2017, and by the full Senate in a 56–43 vote. Nikki Haley was confirmed as UN Ambassador by a vote of 96-4.

On January 26, 2017, when Tillerson visited the United States State Department, Undersecretaries Joyce Anne Barr, Patrick F. Kennedy, Michele Bond, and Gentry O. Smith all simultaneously resigned from the department. Former State Department chief of staff David Wade called the resignations "the single biggest simultaneous departure of institutional memory that anyone can remember." The Trump administration told CNN the officials had been fired and the Chicago Tribune reported that several senior state department career diplomats left the State Department, claiming they "had been willing to remain at their posts but had no expectation of staying."

On February 10, Tom Price was confirmed as Secretary of Health and Human Services, a "$1 trillion government department". The Department of HHS includes National Institutes of Health, the Centers for Disease Control and Prevention, and the Food and Drug Administration. Price, who is a vocal opponent of the Affordable Care Act, also known as Obamacare, claimed he would "oversee its repeal and replacement." He has published articles in the "small, conservative medical association", the Association of American Physicians and Surgeons, to which he belongs, that opposes mandatory vaccination and continued to argue that vaccines cause autism, a "discredited conspiracy theory that Trump has long espoused". In response to questions from Senators at the hearing as to whether he believes autism is caused by vaccines, he responded, "I think the science in that instance is that it does not".

Steve Mnuchin, who was nominated by Trump in November 2016, was finally confirmed on February 13, 2017, as Secretary of the Treasury department after lengthy confirmation hearings.

On February 16, the Senate voted 54-46 to advance Scott Pruitt's nomination as Administrator of the Environmental Protection Agency. On February 16, a District Court Judge in Oklahoma, Aletia Timmons, ordered Pruitt to "turn over thousands of emails related to his communication with the oil, gas and coal industry" in a case brought to court by the Center for Media and Democracy. Lawmakers had criticized Pruitt who sued the EPA 14 times on behalf of the State of Oklahoma.

Trump nominated Alexander Acosta as Secretary of Labor on February 16, when his first nominee Andrew Puzder stepped down after a wave of criticism for having employed an illegal immigrant as a former housekeeper, his "remarks on women and employees at his restaurants", and for his "rancorous 1980s divorce".

== Notable non-Cabinet positions ==
According to a database compiled by The Washington Post in collaboration with the Partnership for Public Service, as of April 27, 473 of the 554 key executive branch nominations that require Presidential nomination and Senate confirmation, had not yet been appointed, including "Cabinet secretaries, deputy and assistant secretaries, chief financial officers, general counsel, heads of agencies, ambassadors and other critical leadership positions." Only 3 of the 119 Department of State executive branch positions had been filled and only one position in the Department of Defense—the Secretary of Defense, James Mattis—had been filled out of 53 key positions. Trump had not yet nominated anyone for 49 of these positions. On February 28, in an exclusive interview Tuesday with Fox & Friends, Trump said, "a lot of those jobs, I don't want to appoint, because they're unnecessary to have. ... You know, we have so many people in government, even me. I look at some of the jobs and it's people over people over people. I say, 'What do all these people do?' You don't need all those jobs ... Many of those jobs I don't want to fill. I say, isn't that a good thing? That's not a bad thing. That's a good thing. We're running a very good, efficient government."

Prior to taking office, Trump named several important White House advisers to positions that do not require Senate confirmation, including Stephen K. Bannon as his "senior counselor and chief West Wing strategist" and Reince Priebus as Chief of Staff, with a mission "as equal partners to transform the federal government." Other important advisers outside of the Cabinet included Counselor to the President Kellyanne Conway, National Security Advisor Michael Flynn (later replaced by H. R. McMaster), National Trade Council Director Peter Navarro. Homeland Security Advisor Thomas P. Bossert, Regulatory Czar Carl Icahn, White House Counsel Donald F. "Don" McGahn II, and Press Secretary Sean Spicer.

Michael T. Flynn served as Trump's National Security Advisor from January 20 until his resignation on February 13, 2017. He set a record for the shortest tenure as National Security Advisor in American history. The Justice Department warned the Trump administration that Flynn, who had a "well-established history with Russia", may have been "vulnerable to blackmail by Moscow". Flynn had "mischaracterized his communications" with Russian Ambassador Sergey Kislyak to Vice President Mike Pence regarding U.S. sanctions on Russia. Flynn's phone calls had been "recorded by a government wiretap" and several days after Flynn was named as Trump's Advisor, Sally Yates, who was then acting attorney general, warned the White House that "Flynn was susceptible to blackmail by the Russians because he had misled Mr. Pence and other officials". According to a February 14 article by The New York Times, it was unclear why the White House did not react to Yates' warning in early January. There were also questions about how much was known in early January by Bannon, Pence, Spicer, and Trump. Yates was fired on January 30, in an unrelated incident.

On February 20, 2017, Trump named "warrior-scholar deemed an expert in counter insurgency", Lieutenant General H. R. McMaster, to replace Flynn as National Security Advisor. Trump overruled McMaster's attempt to replace 30-year-old NSC aide Ezra Cohen-Watnick, a Mike Flynn appointee, with Linda Weissgold, when Bannon and Kushner intervened on Cohen-Watnick's behalf on March 11–12. Cohen-Watnick gathered classified files on intelligence information on U.S. persons.

On January 28, 2017, Trump signed a Memorandum, the Organization of the National Security Council and the Homeland Security Council which restructured the Principals Committee—the senior policy committee—of the National Security Council, assigning a permanent invitation to Steve Bannon, White House Chief Strategist, while at the same time withdrawing the permanent invitations of the Chairman of the Joint Chiefs of Staff and Director of National Intelligence. On April 5, the 75th day of Trump's presidency, under guidance from Army Lieutenant General H. R. McMaster, the National Security Advisor who replaced Mike Flynn, Trump removed Bannon, who had no security experience, from the National Security Council's principals committee.

Trump's 36-year-old son-in-law, Jared Kushner was Trump's Senior Advisor alongside Stephen Miller. "In his January interview with the Times of London, Trump said that Kushner would be in charge of brokering peace in the Israeli–Palestinian conflict. He was also labeled a "top adviser on relations with Canada, China and Mexico". On April 3, Kushner accompanied the head of the Joint Chiefs of Staff, General Joseph F. Dunford Jr. and Homeland Security Advisor Thomas P. Bossert to meet with Iraqi Prime Minister Haider al-Abadi "to discuss the fight against the Islamic State and whether the United States would leave troops in Iraq afterward." Trump named Kushner as head of the White House Office of American Innovation, established on March 29 and mandated to use ideas from the private sector to overhaul all federal agencies and departments in order to "spur job creation". One of the OAI's first priorities is to modernize the technology of departments such as Veterans Affairs. In his new position, Kushner will work with Chris Christie, who will chair the newly established "President's Commission on Combating Drug Addiction and the Opioid Crisis" in response to Trump's pledge to combat opioid abuse.

On January 28, in his eleventh Presidential Memoranda, "Organization of the National Security Council and the Homeland Security Council", White House Chief Strategist, Steve Bannon, was designated as a regular attendee to the National Security Council (NSC)′s Principals Committee, a Cabinet-level senior interagency forum for considering national security issues, in a departure from the previous format in which this role is usually held for generals. While at first there was some confusion over meeting attendees, Priebus clarified on January 30, that defense officials could attend the meetings. On April 5, the 75th day of Trump's presidency, under guidance from Army Lieutenant General H. R. McMaster, the National Security Advisor (NSC advisor) who replaced Mike Flynn, Trump removed Bannon, who has no security experience, from the National Security Council's principals committee.

On February 2, Time published an article about Bannon as potentially, the second most powerful man in the world, illustrated with a cover labeling him as the "Great Manipulator". After only a fortnight into Trump's presidency, NPR described Bannon as "the power behind the throne" and the "gray eminence behind much of what Trump was prioritizing", rivalling Kushner's and Priebus' roles. Mike Pence affirmed in a PBS NewsHour report that only Trump was "in charge".

Bannon and Stephen Miller have been called the "architects" of the inaugural address, executive orders, including the controversial travel and refugees EO, and presidential memoranda.

In an often-cited October 8, 2015, lengthy profile entitled "This Man Is the Most Dangerous Political Operative in America" by Joshua Green, a senior national correspondent for Bloomberg News, Green described how Breitbart News with Bannon at its helm, had "championed Trump's presidential candidacy" and helped "coalesce a splinter faction of conservatives" who were irate over the way in which Fox News had treated Trump. Green quoted then-Senator Jeff Sessions as an admirer of Breitbart, which was "extraordinarily influential", with many radio hosts "reading Breitbart every day". Trump cited Breitbart News to vindicate his claims.

Stephen Miller, Trump's Senior Advisor, was Jeff Sessions' communications director when he served as Senator for Alabama. Thirty-one-year old Miller, Bannon, and Andrew Bremberg sent over 200 executive orders to federal agencies for review before January 20. Miller has been an architect behind the inaugural address and the most "contentious executive orders" including Executive Order 13769.

In a February 12 interview with ABC News anchor George Stephanopoulos, when asked to provide evidence "for Trump's "unfounded allegations" where former Senator Kelly Ayotte lost her bid for election, and Trump narrowly lost to Clinton in 2016, Miller suggested Stephanopoulos interview Kansas Senator, Kris Kobach, who relied upon a 2012 Pew Research Center study in his voter fraud claims. The day before the interview a Federal Election Commission Commissioner called on Trump to provide evidence of what would "constitute thousands of felony criminal offenses under New Hampshire law."

Gary Cohn, the former Goldman Sachs investment banker and executive, took office on January 20, as Trump's Director of the National Economic Council, (NEC), a position which did not require Congressional confirmation, By February 11, 2017, The Wall Street Journal described Cohn as an "economic-policy powerhouse" in Trump's administration and The New York Times called him Trump's "go-to figure on matters related to jobs, business and growth." While the confirmation of Trump's December 12, 2016, nominee for Secretary of Treasury, Steven Mnuchin, was delayed until February 13 by Congressional hearings, Cohn filled in the "personnel vacuum" and pushed "ahead on taxes, infrastructure, financial regulation and replacing health-care law." In November, Trump considered offering Cohn the position as Secretary of Treasury. If Cohn had stayed at Goldman Sachs, some believed he would have become CEO when Lloyd Blankfein vacated that office and his $285 million severance package "raised eyebrows" according to CNN. Bannon and Cohn disagree on the border-adjustment tax, the centerpiece of Paul Ryan's controversial tax reforms presented on February 17, which includes a 20% import tax, export subsidies and a 15% reduction in corporate tax rates that would, among other things, pay for the Mexican wall, which according to a The Washington Post study, would cost $25 billion and which Trump stated would cost $12 billion.

== Domestic policy ==
=== United States Domestic Policy Council ===
The Domestic Policy Council (DPC) consists of Trump and Andrew Bremberg as Directors with Paul Winfree as Deputy Assistant. Council attendees include Mike Pence, Jeff Sessions, Tom Price, John F. Kelly, David Shulkin, Ryan Zinke, Betsy DeVos, Ben Carson, Elaine Chao, Wilbur Ross, Rick Perry, Steven Mnuchin, and—when appointed—the Secretary of Labor and the Secretary of Agriculture. Additional attendees include Scott Pruitt, Mick Mulvaney (Director of the Office of Management and Budget), Gary Cohn, and—when appointed—the Chair of the Council of Economic Advisers and the Director of the Office of National Drug Control Policy. The Congressional Research Service describes DPC's role as analyses of domestic policies and social programs including "education, labor and worker safety; health-care insurance and financing; health services and research; aging policy studies; Social Security, pensions and disability insurance; immigration, homeland security, domestic intelligence and criminal justice; and welfare, nutrition and housing programs."

=== Withdrawal of the Affordable Care Act ===
Within the first hours of Trump's presidency, he signed his first executive order, Minimizing the Economic Burden of the Patient Protection and Affordable Care Act Pending Repeal (EO 13765) to fulfill part of his pledge to repeal the Patient Protection and Affordable Care Act (ACA), which was part of a series of steps taken prior to 2017 to repeal and defund the ACA, including most recently, the FY2017 budget resolution, S.Con.Res. 3, that contained language allowing the repeal of ACA through the budget reconciliation process. A CBO report estimated 18 million people would lose their insurance and premiums would rise by 20% to 25% in the first year after repealing Obamacare. Uninsured could reach 32 million by 2026, while premiums could double. The order states what Trump made clear during his campaign: that it is his administration's policy to seek the "prompt repeal" of Obamacare. During his Fox News interview with Bill O'Reilly airing before the Super Bowl, Trump announced that the timeline for replacing Obamacare had to be extended and that a replacement would probably not be ready until 2018. Republicans are limited as to how much of ACA they can undo as they do not have a 60-vote majority in the Senate. They also "must balance the interests of insurers and medical providers". According to the March 13, 2017, report by the nonpartisan Congressional Budget Office and staff of the Joint Committee on Taxation (JCT) on the budgetary impact of the Republican bill to repeal and replace ACA over the coming decade, there would be a $337 billion reduction in the federal deficit and an estimated loss of coverage to 24 million more Americans. The Republican health-care plan was unveiled on March 6 and faced opposition from both moderate and conservative Republicans, such as the House Freedom Caucus. The American Health Care Act of 2017 (AHCA), a bill to repeal and replace the ACA, was withdrawn in Congress on March 24, 2017, due to lack of support from within the Republican caucus.

=== Immigration policy ===
In his first 100 days, President Trump signed executive orders to set in motion travel bans and restrictions on refugees and immigrants from Muslim-majority countries, increased immigration enforcement including deportations, and expanded efforts to prevent illegal entry into the United States by building a wall along the Mexico–United States border. While the numbers of people deported were very similar to those in 2016, the categories of people targeted for deportations was broadened during this period, which meant that many more people are at a heightened risk of deportation. Secretary Kelly clarified that Immigration and Customs Enforcement (ICE) "will no longer exempt classes or categories of removable aliens from potential enforcement." By April 3, according to ICE, there had been 35,604 removals in January and February 2017 compared to 35,255 in the same period in 2016. But the "tough rhetoric" and some "high-profile Ice operations" widely cited in the media resulted in widespread fear and panic within immigrant communities.

In an AP April 20 interview, Trump said that, "The dreamers should rest easy". There are 800,000 young people protected by Obama's "Deferred Action for Childhood Arrivals" (DREAMERS) who came to the U.S. as children and are living there illegally. Some of these "dreamers" in interviews with The Associated Press on April 21, said they "were not comforted by Trump's pledge" particularly since the April 18 deportation of 23-year-old "dreamer", Juan Manuel Montes. Trump supporters who are "immigration hard-liners", such as NumbersUSA and Mark Krikorian of the Center for Immigration Studies, feel deceived by Trump's softening stance on DREAMERs arguing that "[h]is promise on DACA was pretty clear and unequivocal".

==== Travel ban and refugee suspension ====
Map of countries affected by Executive Order 13769. Collectively, the order applies to over 200 million people (approximate population of the seven countries) while about 90,000 people from these countries currently hold a US immigrant or non-immigrant visa.

On January 27, at 4:42 p.m EST, Trump signed Executive Order 13769, entitled "Protecting the Nation From Terrorist Attacks by Foreign Nationals" which temporarily suspends the U. S. Refugee Admissions Program (USRAP) for 120 days and denies entry to citizens of Iraq, Iran, Libya, Somalia, Sudan, Syria and Yemen for 90 days. The suspension for Syrian refugees is for an indefinite period of time. The Economist described the order as "drafted in secret, enacted in haste and unlikely to fulfill its declared aim of sparing America from terrorism" with "Republican allies" lamenting that a "fine, popular policy was marred by its execution." Notably Saudi Arabia was not on the list though most of the 9/11 hijackers were from there. See Provisions of Order 13769.

On February 4, the U.S. Department of Homeland Security and the State Department suspended all actions to implement the week-old EO in response to the February 3 ruling by federal judge James Robart which blocked the EO. According to CNN and the Los Angeles Times, the architects behind the order, were Stephen Miller and Steve Bannon. White House officials deny that it was written without input from the U.S. Department of Justice's Office of Legal Counsel (OLC). It was argued that these seven countries ranked among the lowest 15 of the 104 countries evaluated by the Henley & Partners Visa Restrictions Index in 2016 based on the "number of countries that their citizens can travel to visa-free". For example, Germany ranks the highest at 177 points, Afghanistan the lowest of all 104 at 25. The order also calls for an expedited completion and implementation of the Biometric Entry-Exit Tracking System for all travelers coming into the United States. The first legal challenge against the EO was filed on January 28, and within two days there were dozens of ongoing lawsuits in the United States federal courts. By February 3, federal judge, James Robart temporarily blocked the week-old EO which opened American airports to visa holders from the seven targeted countries. At the international level legal concerns have been raised by the UN, Zeid Ra'ad al Hussein, who claimed that "discrimination on nationality alone is forbidden under human rights law." On January 30, in a telephone call to Trump, German Chancellor Angela Merkel explained that his EO "ran counter to the duties of all signatory states" to the Geneva Refugee Convention "to take in war refugees on humanitarian grounds".

Thousands protested at airports and other locations throughout the United States. Critics of the ban include most Democrats and several top Republican Congressmen, former President Obama, the Council on American–Islamic Relations, over a dozen state attorneys general, thousands of academics, Nobel laureates, technology companies, Iran, France, Germany, and 800,000 petitioners in Britain. Supporters of the ban include 82% of GOP voters, Paul Ryan, Bob Goodlatte, Czech President Miloš Zeman, and members of the European far right. According to an IPSOS online poll conducted on January 31, in response to the question, "Do you agree or disagree with the Executive Order that President Trump signed blocking refugees and banning people from seven Muslim majority countries from entering the U.S.?", 48% of the 1,201 Americans polled agreed with the statement (23% of the 453 Democrats, 82% of the 478 Republicans, and 44% of the Independents polled).

On the evening of January 30, Trump replaced acting Attorney General Sally Yates with Dana Boente. Spicer's statement described Yates as an "Obama administration appointee" who had "betrayed the Department of Justice" by "refusing to enforce a legal order". In the Senate, Chuck Schumer, called her firing a Monday Night Massacre in reference to Nixon's firing of his attorney general, referred to as the Saturday Night Massacre during Watergate. Trump also replaced DHS's ICE Chief Daniel Ragsdale with Thomas Homan as Acting Director in the evening of January 30.

In a live interview with Chris Wallace on January 29, Fox News Sunday, Kellyanne Conway, justified the list of seven countries by claiming that the countries were originally identified as a threat in the Terrorist Prevention Act passed by Congress in 2015. HUD's Visa Waiver Program Improvement and Terrorist Travel Prevention Act of 2015, was extended amid some controversy in February 2016, when it revoked the privilege of traveling to the States without a visa to people who "had recently traveled to Iraq, Syria, Iran or Sudan", as they were considered high-risk. A spokesman for former president Obama issued a statement stating, "The president [Obama] fundamentally disagrees with the notion of discriminating against individuals because of their faith or religion." In his final press statement as president, Obama said, "There's a difference between [the] normal functioning of politics and certain issues or certain moments where I think our core values may be at stake," and stated his intention to speak out if a situation is serious enough. Obama encouraged Americans to protest the issue.

In response to a temporary restraining order (TRO) issued in the case of State of Washington v. Trump, the Department of Homeland Security said on February 4 that it had stopped enforcing the portions of the executive order affected by the judgment, while the State Department activated visas that had been previously suspended. The restraining order was upheld by the United States Court of Appeals for the Ninth Circuit on February 9, 2017.

On March 15, a United States Federal Judge, Derrick Watson of the District Court of Hawaii, issued a 43-page ruling which blocked Trump's revised March 6 executive order 13780 on the grounds that it violated the First Amendment's Establishment Clause by disfavoring a particular religion. The temporary restraining order was converted to a preliminary injunction by Judge Watson on March 29. On an April 18 airing of the Mark Levin Show Jeff Sessions commented, "We are confident that the President will prevail on appeal and particularly in the Supreme Court, if not the Ninth Circuit. So this is a huge matter. I really am amazed that a judge sitting on an island in the Pacific can issue an order that stops the President of the United States from what appears to be clearly his statutory and Constitutional power."

==== High-profile ICE operations ====
On February 8, 2017, Immigration and Customs Enforcement (ICE) agents arrested 35-year-old Guadalupe García de Rayos, when she attended her required annual review at the ICE office in Phoenix, and deported her to Mexico on the next day based on a removal order issued in 2013 by the Executive Office for Immigration Review. Immigrant advocates believe that she is the first to be deported after the EO was signed and that her deportation "reflects the severity" of the "crackdown" on illegal immigration. ICE officials said that her case went through multiple reviews in the immigration court system and that the "judges held she did not have a legal basis to remain in the US". In 2008, she was working at an amusement park in Mesa, Arizona when then-Sheriff Joe Arpaio ordered a raid that resulted in her arrest and felony identity theft conviction for possessing a false Social Security number. Arpaio was a subject of several controversies during his tenure as sheriff. In 2015, the U.S. Department of Justice partially settled a lawsuit filed against Arpaio for unlawful discriminatory police conduct, alleging that Arpaio had overseen the worst pattern of racial profiling in U.S. history. ICE officials in Los Angeles released a report on February 10, 2017, that about 160 foreign nationals were arrested in a five-day operation. Of those, 150 had criminal histories, and of the remaining arrests, five had final orders of removal or were previously deported. Ninety-five percent were male. Under Trump's EO, the definition of criminal is much more "sweeping" than Obama's, which "prioritized expulsion of undocumented immigrants who threatened public safety or national security, had ties to criminal gang activity, committed serious felony offenses or were habitual misdemeanor criminal offenders" and a single immigration officer decides. On the morning of February 14, ICE officials entered the Des Moines, Washington family home of 23-year-old Daniel Ramirez Medina on an arrest warrant for Ramirez' father, who was taken into custody. Ramirez, who has no criminal record, entered the United States illegally as a child, and was later able to get a legal work permit through the 2012 Deferred Action for Childhood Arrivals (DACA) policy, was placed in detention in the Northwest Detention Center, Tacoma, Washington. According to ICE, Ramirez was detained based on "his admitted gang affiliation and risk to public safety". According to Ramirez's lawyer, Ramirez "unequivocally denies" these allegations and claimed ICE agents "repeatedly pressured" Ramirez to "falsely admit" gang affiliation. "The case raises questions about what it could mean for Dreamers, undocumented immigrants who were brought to the United States as children."

==== U.S.–Mexico border wall proposal ====
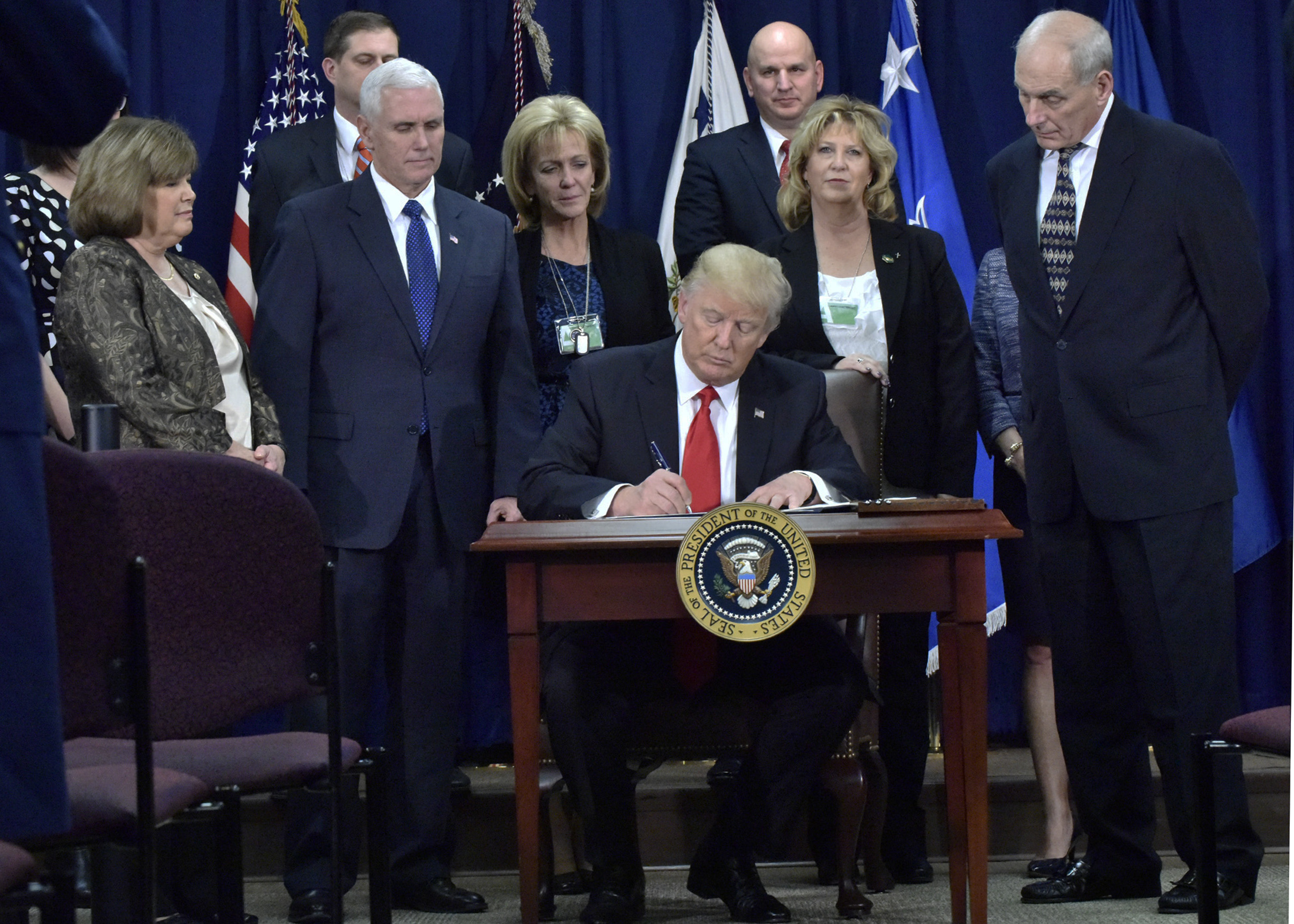
President Trump signs an executive order at a ceremony at DHS headquarters

While visiting the Department of Homeland Security (DHS) on January 25, President Trump signed his third executive order Border Security and Immigration Enforcement Improvements (EO 13767) under the (INA), the Secure Fence Act, and the (IIRIRA) for the construction of a Mexican border wall to deter illegal migration and smuggling of illegal products. The existing Mexico–United States barrier is not one continuous structure, but a series of physical walls and physical and "virtual" fences monitored by the United States Border Patrol. The proposed wall which would be "a contiguous, physical wall or other similarly secure, contiguous, and impassable physical barrier" along the entire length of the border, which Trump estimated in 2016 would cost $10 billion to $12 billion, and by January 27 was estimated to be $20 billion, to be initially paid by Congress. Trump planned on eventually negotiating a reimbursement from the Mexican government, however no such reimbursement happened. While the Executive Order entitled "Border Security and Immigration Enforcement Improvements", contains no information of payment, it requests federal agency reports by late March 2017 which "identify and quantify all sources of direct and indirect Federal aid or assistance to the Government of Mexico on an annual basis over the past five years, including all bilateral and multilateral development aid, economic assistance, humanitarian aid, and military aid."

On January 27, Forbes cautioned that the 20% Mexican Import Tariff on all imported goods announced by Spicer to pay for the 1,933-mile (3,111 km) frontier wall would be "paid by Americans". GOP donors, Brothers Charles and David Koch, and their advocacy group, Americans For Prosperity, oppose Paul Ryan's 'Buy American' Tax Plan, which they claim would add a "whopping tax hike of more than $1 trillion on American families and small businesses over 10 years." The import tariff would raise prices at Wal-Mart, for example, directly impacting lower income families.

The Washington Post reported on April 25, that Trump had agreed to delaying funding for the construction of the wall until September to avoid a government shutdown.

==== Sanctuary cities ====
On January 25, Trump signed an executive order, "Enhancing Public Safety in the Interior of the United States", to the Secretary of Homeland Security and the Attorney General and their departments and agencies to increase the enforcement of immigration laws which included the hiring of 10,000 "additional immigration officers". His order requires the cooperation of state and local authorities. The order states "sanctuary jurisdictions" including "sanctuary cities" who refuse to comply will not be "eligible to receive Federal grants, except as deemed necessary for law enforcement purposes by the Attorney General or the Secretary". Some officials claim that the "U.S. Constitution bars the federal government from commandeering state officials or using federal funds to 'coerce' states into doing the bidding of Washington." Mayors of New York, Boston, Denver, Los Angeles, San Francisco, and Seattle have expressed concerns about the Order and do not want to "change the way their cities treat immigrants". Jeff Sessions is considered to be an "inspiration" for Trump's anti-immigration policies. On August 31, 2016, Trump laid out a 10-step plan as part of his immigration policy where he reiterated that all illegal immigrants are "subject to deportation" with priority given to illegal immigrants who have committed significant crimes and those who have overstayed visas. He noted that all those seeking legalization would have to go home and re-enter the country legally. In a meeting with concerned mayors, Sessions explained that the Executive Order merely directs cities to enforce the preexisting thirty-year-old law, 8 U.S.C. 1373 which means that "there is no sanctuary city debate." On April 25, U.S. District Judge William Orrick III sided with San Francisco and Santa Clara in their lawsuit against the Trump administration, issuing a temporary injunction effectively blocking the order targeting so-called sanctuary cities. Justice Orrick said that the president "has no authority to attach new conditions to federal spending". Judge Orrick issued a nationwide permanent injunction on November 20, 2017, declaring that section 9(a) of Executive Order 13768 was "unconstitutional on its face" and violates "the separation of powers doctrine and deprives [the plaintiffs] of their Tenth and Fifth Amendment rights."

=== Social policy ===
Trump's appointment of a conservative justice, Neil Gorsuch, his reinstatement of the Mexico City Policy, and his signing H.J. Res. 43—HHS Title X Funding for Planned Parenthood Rule are in keeping with his pro-life policy. On January 23, Trump signed a Presidential Memorandum on the Mexico City Policy regarding federal funding to foreign NGOs. This is a key point in the abortion debate as foreign NGOs that receive US federal funding will no longer be able to offer, promote or perform abortion services as part of family planning in their own countries using non-U.S. government funds. Forbes claimed this could "potentially affect $9.5 billion" in programs that reach "225 million women globally".

On April 13, Trump quietly signed H.J. Res. 43—HHS Title X Funding for Planned Parenthood Rule— reversing Obama's December 2016 regulation which had mandated that Title X recipients—like states local and state governments—distribute federal funds for services related to contraception, sexually transmitted infections, fertility, pregnancy care, and breast and cervical cancer screening to qualified health providers, regardless of whether they also perform abortions". Bloomberg noted that although this was "one of the few opportunities" Trump has had in his first 100 days to enact legislation, he signed this bill in private. The Obama rule never came into effect as it was blocked by a federal judge. Republicans want to cut off federal funding from health-care organizations such as Planned Parenthood that perform abortions. Proponents of the bill claim it supports states' rights over federalist rights. The bill was passed under the procedures of the Congressional Review Act. In the Senate Vice-President Pence cast a tie-breaking vote. This will be an issue at the end of the first 100 days as Congress tries to avoid a government shutdown. In Fiscal Year 2014, Planned Parenthood clinics received $20.5 million of the $252.6 million distributed under the Title X Family Planning grant program.

The proposed American Health Care Act, announced by Congressional Republicans in March 2017, would have made Planned Parenthood "ineligible for Medicaid reimbursements or federal family planning grants".

=== Suspended reduction of Federal Housing Mortgage Insurance Premium rates ===
Within the first hours of Trump's presidency, he "suspended indefinitely" the reduced "Mortgage Insurance Premiums for loans with Closing/Disbursement date on or after January 27, 2017", known as the Federal Housing Administration's (FHA) Annual Mortgage Insurance Premium (MIP) Rates managed under the United States Department of Housing and Urban Development (HUD). It is "effective immediately". Obama's rate cut would have lowered borrowing costs for first time and low income house buyers.

=== Gun control ===
In February 2017, the Trump administration signed into law a bill that rolled back a regulation implemented by the Obama administration, which would have prohibited approximately 75,000 individuals who were receiving Social Security disability and had representative payees, from owning guns. The bill was supported by the ACLU, the National Association for Mental Health, The American Association of People with Disabilities, and the National Council on Disability, the Consortium for Citizens with Disabilities, as well as other disability rights advocates. The initial regulation was supported by the Brady Campaign to Stop Gun Violence, Moms Demand Action Against Gun Violence, Democratic gun control advocates, and some mental health experts.

=== High-priority infrastructure ===
On January 24, Trump signed his second Executive Order entitled Expediting Environmental Reviews and Approvals for High Priority Infrastructure Projects (EO 13766) which is part of a series of five executive orders to date. This Order was part of a series "designed to speed environmental permitting and reviews" as " major infrastructure projects trigger an array of overlapping environmental and natural resource laws and requirements".

On April 19, Trump signed a bill that extended the VA's Choice beyond August. The 2014 Veterans' Access to Care through Choice, Accountability, and Transparency Act was enacted in by the Obama administration in response to the Veterans Health Administration scandal of 2014.

== Foreign policy ==
The main group advising the President on foreign affairs and national security is the National Security Council (NSC) which coordinates national agencies such as the secretaries of defense and state; the secretaries of the army, navy, and air force.

On April 10, The Wall Street Journal described Trump's foreign policy as moving away from the "America First", "isolationist" policies towards more "mainstream" and "conventional" tendencies under the more stabilizing influence of Tillerson, Mattis, McMaster, Ross, and Kushner.

On the first day of Trump's presidency, the White House website had posted a 220-word description of its foreign policy. It was protectionist with a focus on "America First", as was his inaugural address. His three top priorities were to defeat ISIS, to rebuild the military, and to embrace diplomacy.

=== Defense ===
At the time Trump took office, U.S. military spending had reached its highest peak ever. Trump requested $30 billion for FY 2017 which ends in September, and an increase of $54 billion to Defense Department for FY 2018. The $639 billion in FY2018 would result in deep cuts to many other departments including the State Department, the diplomatic arm of the administration.

After Trump's April 12 first face-to-face meeting with NATO Secretary General Jens Stoltenberg, Trump announced that he had changed views about NATO. Trump had previously complained that NATO was "obsolete" as it did not fight terrorism. On March 18, Trump called on NATO's member nations to contribute more to NATO. After the White House meeting, Trump realized that NATO has been engaged in combating groups like ISIS. Trump will maintain the "US commitment to NATO while reiterating its member nations must step up their military financing".

On January 29, Trump authorized the first military operation of his Presidency—a raid by US commandos on Al-Qaeda in Yakla, Baida in Yemen. At least 14 jihadists were killed in the raid, as well as 10 civilians, including children. The raid also resulted in the death of Chief Petty Officer William Owens a 36-year-old Virginia-based Navy SEAL, the first U.S. combat casualty in Trump's presidency.

According to The New York Times, Owen's death "came after a chain of mishaps and misjudgments that plunged the elite commandos into a ferocious 50-minute firefight that also left three others wounded and a $75 million aircraft deliberately destroyed."

On April 6, 2017, Trump ordered a missile strike on Shayrat Air Base near Homs, in Syria. 59 Tomahawk missiles were launched from the USS Ross (DDG-71) and USS Porter (DDG-78) from the Mediterranean Sea.

On April 8, four days after North Korea had test-fired a ballistic missile, an announcement by the United States Pacific Command (PACOM) commander was posted via U.S. Third Fleet Public Affairs stating that PACOM had ordered the USS Carl Vinson supercarrier to "sail north and report on station in the Western Pacific Ocean". It was a premature announcement that led to a "glitch-ridden sequence of events"—a result of confusion created by a "miscommunication" between the Pentagon and the White House. On April 8 and April 9, media outlets such as Fox News, RT, CNN, USA Today, BBC and others had published the erroneous announcement that warships were heading to the Korean Peninsula within the context of escalating US-North Korean tensions. In an interview with FOX Business Network's Maria Bartiromo that aired on April 12, President Trump warned, "We are sending an armada. Very powerful. We have submarines. Very powerful. Far more powerful than the aircraft carrier. That I can tell you." By April 17, North Korea's deputy United Nations ambassador accused the United States of "turning the Korean peninsula into "the world's biggest hotspot" and the North Korean government stated "its readiness to declare war on the United States if North Korean forces were to be attacked." On April 17, the Defense News broke the story that the Carl Vinson and its escorts were 3,500 miles from Korea, engaged in scheduled joint Royal Australian Navy exercises in the Indian Ocean. According to Dana White, the Pentagon's chief spokeswoman, the Carl Vinson was heading north on April 18. The Wall Street Journal reported on April 19, that the incident sparked both "criticism and ridicule" as some felt "duped by Trump". In the article, Hong Joon-pyo, a candidate in the 2017 South Korean presidential election, was quoted as saying, "What President Donald Trump said was important for the national security of South Korea. If that was a lie, then during Trump's term, South Korea will not trust whatever Trump says."

On April 13, the United States dropped a "mother of all bombs" (MOAB) in the Nangarhar Province Afghanistan— the first use of the bomb on the battlefield. On April 8, Staff Sgt. Mark De Alencar was killed during an operation against ISIS in Nangarhar Province.

The most consequential shift in Trump's defense policy was the April 6 cruise-missile launch at a Syrian airbase.

=== Trade policies ===
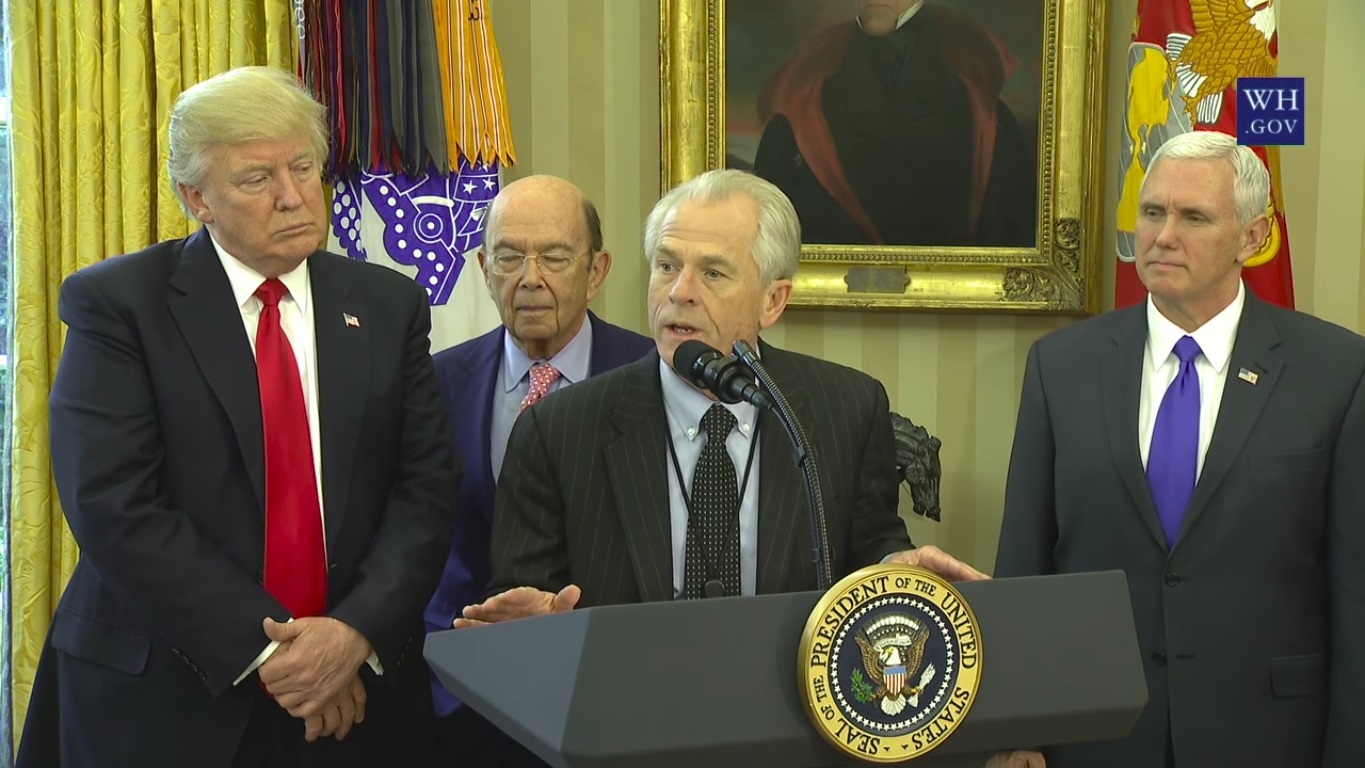
Peter Navarro, Director of the White House National Trade Council, addresses President Donald Trump's promises to American people, workers, and domestic manufacturers (Declaring American Economic Independence on June 28, 2016) in the Oval Office with Vice President Mike Pence and Secretary of Commerce Wilbur Ross before President Trump signs two Executive Orders regarding trade in March 2017.

On January 23, Trump fulfilled a campaign pledge by signing an executive order withdrawing the United States from the Trans-Pacific Partnership (TPP) or Trans Pacific Partnership Agreement (TPPA). According to the BBC, Trump had pledged to withdraw from the Trans Pacific Partnership (TPP) and he signed an executive order on the TPP his first few days. However, the EO was largely symbolic since the deal has not been ratified by a divided US Congress." The Trans-Pacific Partnership (TPP) or Trans Pacific Partnership Agreement (TPPA), was a trade agreement between the United States and eleven Pacific Rim nations—Australia, Brunei, Canada, Chile, Japan, Malaysia, Mexico, New Zealand, Peru, Singapore, and Vietnam that would have created a "free-trade zone for about 40 percent of the world's economy.

On April 18, 2017, President Trump signed Executive Order 13788, which directed federal agencies to implement a "Buy American and Hire American" strategy. The executive order directed federal agencies to implement a new system that favored higher-skilled, higher-paid applicants. The order was the first initiative in response to a key pledge made by Trump during his presidential campaign to promote 'Buy American, Hire American'. The EO was intended to order federal agencies to review and propose reforms to the H-1B visa system. Through the order, Trump stated his broad policy of economic nationalism without having to go through Congress. Cabinet secretaries from Departments of Labor, Justice, Homeland Security, and State would "fill in the details with reports and recommendations about what the administration can legally do". Trump argued that the EO would "end the 'theft of American prosperity'", which he said had been brought on by low-wage immigrant labor. The OMB and Department of Commerce issued a memorandum on implementation across federal procurement and grant-making activities in June 2017. The order was revoked by President Biden on 25 January 2021.

On March 31, President Donald Trump signed two executive orders on trade. One examines forms of "trade abuse", taking a country-by-country as well as product and industry look over 90 days at cheating, law enforcement, and currency misalignment by foreign countries that causes U.S. trade deficits. President Trump said the order ensures "that we fully collect all duties imposed on foreign importers that cheat, the cheaters". Another to strengthen anti-dumping rules and countervailing duties. The order directs Homeland Security, Commerce, and Treasury departments to ensure enforcement and "those who break the rules will face severe consequences".

Trump, who had been dismissive of the Export-Import Bank (ExIm), made an about-face on April 15 by nominating Scott Garrett as head of the ExIm breaking a deadlock that had prevented the Bank from operating since 2014. Although Trump had privately made known that he would not side with "conservative Republicans, including those in his own administration", who wanted to "cripple" the ExIm in February, he did not announce it publicly until April 13, when he told The Wall Street Journal that he would fill two seats of ExIm's five-seat board which would allow the Bank to make loans greater than $10 million. Trump had been one of ExIm's harshest critics. Conservatives call it the 'Bank of Boeing' and an 'epicenter of crony capitalism'. Its supporters such as Boeing and General Electric Co, claim that it facilitates trade worth billions of dollars in exports helping hundreds of businesses. Prior to making the announcement, Trump held two significant meetings related to ExIm—an April 3 formal visit with Egyptian president Abdel Fattah el-Sisi, who was negotiating for billions of dollars in ExIm financing, and an April 11 meeting with Boeing Chief Executive Jim McNerney. Sisi also met with Lockheed Martin and General Electric CEOs during his visit to the U.S. in April.

=== International relations ===
==== Australia ====
A February 2 report by The Washington Post claimed that US President Donald Trump berated the Australian, Prime Minister Turnbull during one of Trump's first phone calls made to foreign officials. Trump stated that the 2016 asylum deal was an attempt to export the next Boston bombers to the United States. The contentious deal involves a 2016 agreement between the Obama administration and Australia whereby the U.S. would resettle 1,250 refugees held in controversial offshore immigration detention facilities—Manus and Nauru islands. In return, Australia would 'resettle refugees from El Salvador, Guatemala and Honduras". The full transcript of that phone conversation was leaked in August 2017, and published by the Washington Post. Later that day, Trump explained that while he respected Australia, they, along with many other countries, were "terribly taking advantage" of the United States. The following day, Australian Ambassador to the United States Joe Hockey was sent to the White House and held meetings with White House Chief Strategist Steve Bannon and Chief of Staff Reince Priebus. Spicer described the phone call as "very cordial". The 25-minute phone call on January 28, was described as "acrimonious" by Reuters and Trump's "worst call by far" with a foreign leader by The Washington Post. During a joint news conference with Prime Minister Turnbull, Vice-President Pence—who was on a "10-day, four-country trip" in April to the Pacific Rim—announced that even if the United States did not "admire the agreement", Trump had made it clear the United States would honour the 2016 agreement to resettle refugees. Turnbull responded, "whatever the reservations of the president are", the decision "speaks volumes for the commitment, the integrity of President Trump, and your administration, sir, to honour that commitment." "The US is Australia's most important security partner, while China is its most important trading partner."

==== Canada ====
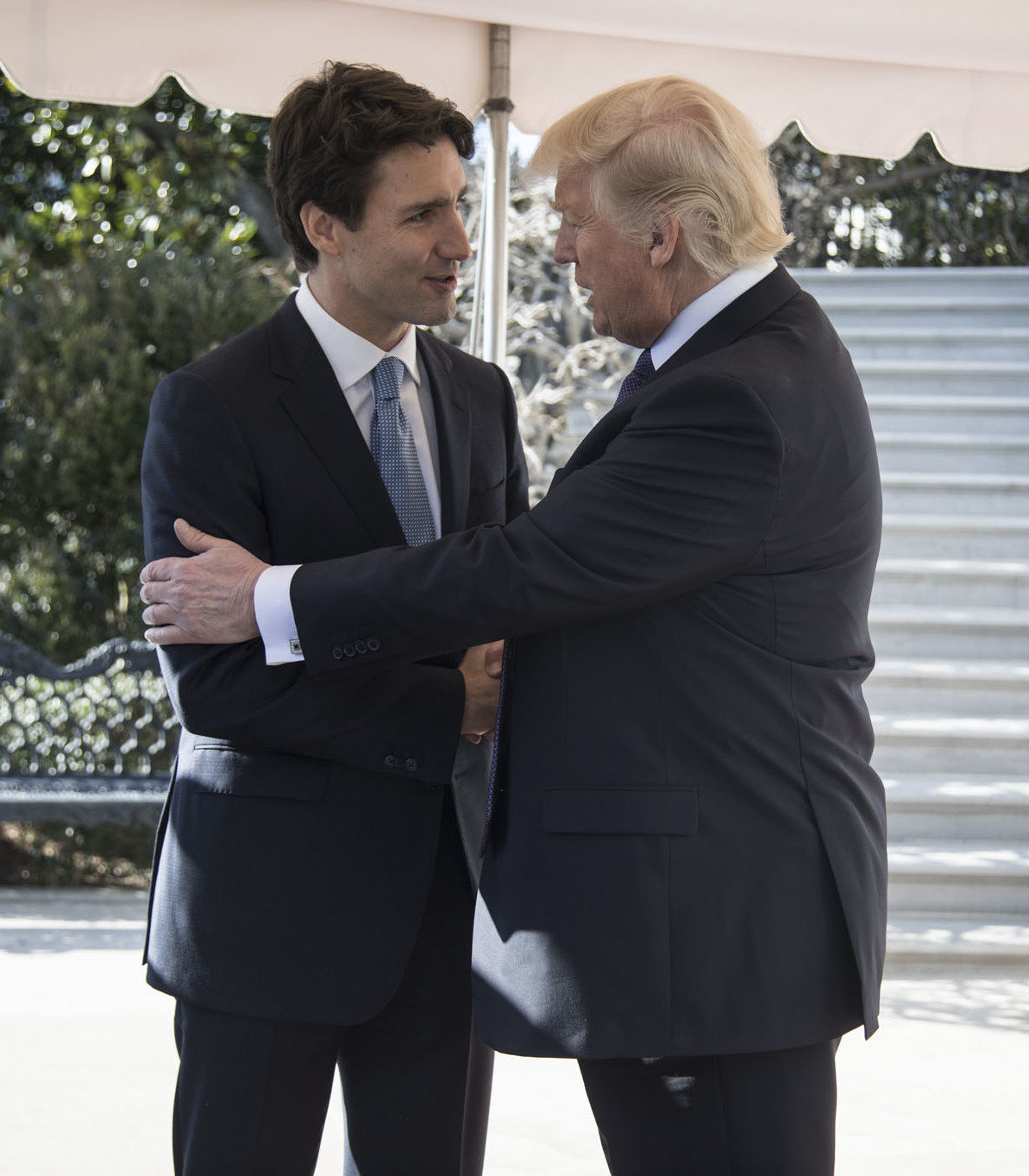
Prime Minister Justin Trudeau (left) and President Donald Trump (right) meet in Washington in February 2017

Prime Minister Justin Trudeau met Trump in Washington, D.C., in February 2017. Trudeau said that "The last thing Canadians expect is for me to come down and lecture another country on how they choose to govern," referring to Trump's "refugee ban"—Executive Order 13769. The two leaders emphasized the importance of the two countries' ongoing relationship, with Trudeau adding that "there are times when we have differed in our approaches. And that's always been done firmly and respectfully." Commerce Secretary Wilbur Ross said that, "It has been a bad week for U.S.-Canada trade relations", as he announced tariffs of up to 24% on Canadian lumber on April 24, as dairy product trade fell through. The Canada–United States softwood lumber dispute has been since ongoing since the 1980s making it one of the longest trade disputes between the two countries, as well as one of the largest. Trump is under pressure to begin renegotiating NAFTA, the trade deal between Canada, Mexico and the US. On April 25, Canada's International Trade Minister Francois-Philippe Champagne and soft lumber industry representatives promoted trade with China in Beijing in response to what is perceived as U.S. protectionist policies.

==== China ====
The Mar-a-Lago summit meeting on April 6 and 7 between Trump and General Secretary of the Chinese Communist Party Xi Jinping of China, during the first 100 days of the new US administration, was heralded by The Telegraph as the "most significant bilateral summit in decades". In spite of differences regarding Taiwan, the South China Sea and the most urgent issue—North Korea's nuclear programme—"the summit between the US and Chinese presidents had both symbolic and tangible successes," according to the South China Morning Post. During the April 7–8 visit with CCP general secretary Xi Jinping, Trump acknowledged that international relations are much more complicated than he had imagined. In regards to North Korea, he had hoped to negotiate better trade deals with China in exchange for China dealing with the nuclear threat from North Korea. In an interview with Wall Street Journal's Gerald F. Seib Trump said, "After listening for 10 minutes, I realized it's not so easy. I felt pretty strongly that they had a tremendous power [over] North Korea. ... But it's not what you would think." Trump also affirmed that North Korea was the United States' "biggest international threat".

The BBC reported on April 19 that China "was 'seriously concerned" about nuclear threats" as tensions between North Korea and the United States escalated with a "war of words" between North Korea's leader Kim Jong-un and the Trump administration. Recent threats included Vice President Mike Pence's statement that the period of "strategic patience" was over and his April 19 statement that the US "would meet any attack with an 'overwhelming response'". North Korea recently warned of "full-out nuclear war if Washington takes military action against it." Trump has called for China to rein in North Korea, but state media outlet China Daily opined that "Washington must be aware of the limitations to Beijing's abilities, and refrain from assuming that the matter can be consigned entirely to Beijing alone." China Daily considered the U.N. Security Council statement adopted on April 20 condemning North Korea's recent attempted missile launch, as an indication that the Trump administration is considering a "diplomatic solution".

In an April 12 interview with Wall Street Journal, Trump said he had changed his mind and he would not label China a currency manipulator, which had been one of his 100-day pledges. By April he believed that China had not been manipulating its currency for months. He did not want to "jeopardize" talks with the Chinese "on confronting the threat of North Korea". Early in Trump's presidency, the world's largest financial newspaper, Nikkei Asian Review, had reported on February 1, that Trump had labelled China and Japan as currency manipulators.

The Trump administration confirmed its commitment to defend Japan against China's claims to the Senkaku Islands in the East China Sea through the Treaty of Mutual Cooperation and Security between the United States and Japan during a U.S. Defense Secretary James Mattis's visit to Japan on February 4. By February 9, US-Chinese relations—the most important bilateral relationship—had remained strained, President Xi Jinping and Trump had not spoken and this had "drawn increasing scrutiny". Xi was concerned by the December 2, 2016, phone call from Taiwan President Tsai Ing-wen to Trump and Trump's questioning of the One China policy. On February 10, Trump and Xi Jinping spoke on the phone for the first time since Donald Trump took office, during which Donald Trump committed to honoring the One China policy at Xi's request.

During the World Economic Forum annual meeting in Davos on January 17–20, China's President Xi Jinping, as keynote speaker, "vigorously" defended globalization in a speech that the Financial Times described as "one would have expected to come from a US president". Mr. Xi observed that "blaming economic globalisation for the world's problems is inconsistent with reality ... globalisation has powered global growth and facilitated movement of goods and capital, advances in science, technology and civilisation, and interactions among people In 2015, China became the United States' largest trade partner, placing Canada second. The Times 2017 article, citing an analysis by Peterson Institute for International Economics, noted that "China and Mexico together account for a quarter of US trade". Concerns have been raised about Trump's proposed imposition of a 45 percent tariff on imports from China. On January 23, The U.S. Commerce Department announced new countervailing duties (CVDs) ranging from 38.61 to 65.46 percent on Chinese vehicles in the antidumping case. In 2015, over 8.9 million Chinese truck and bus tires worth $1.07 billion were imported to the United States.

At his Senate confirmation hearing as Secretary of State, in mid-January, Rex Tillerson's statements about the South China Sea, "set the stage for a possible crisis between the world's two biggest economies should his comments become official American policy" and "put further strains on one of the world's most important bilateral relationships." According to an article on January 28, in the South China Morning Post, an official from China's Central Military Commission's Defence Mobilisation Department, ranking Chinese military official considers war between China and the United States a real possibility during Trump's term as president. An article in The Guardian claims, "The bad news is that if in the coming months or years Trump faces an ignominious end to his presidency through scandal or mismanagement, a national crisis—involving China, or ISIS or another foreign actor—could allow him to cling to power."

==== Egypt ====
On April 3, Trump hosted a formal visit with Egyptian president Abdel Fattah el-Sisi, in an effort to "reset" relations between the two countries, offering the U.S. government's "strong backing". Ties between the two countries were strained since Sisi deposed Egyptian president Mohamed Morsi during the July 2013 military coup. Trump publicly stated that Sisi's autocratic leadership was 'fantastic'. Sisi, who is seeking "billions of dollars in financing" from the Export-Import Bank for large investments in infrastructure investments, also met with the representatives from the IMF, the World Bank, Lockheed Martin and General Electric. Trump nominated a new head of ExIm which facilitates its operation—the ExIm had been hamstrung since 2014 because of opposition by Republicans. During his talks with Sisi in April, Senate Foreign Relations Committee Chairman Bob Corker (R-Tenn.) had advocated for the release of six humanitarian workers, including a U.S. citizen—30-year-old Aya Hijazi and her husband, who had been imprisoned in Egypt since May 1, 2014. A court in Egypt dropped all charges against them on April 16.

==== European Union ====
In a 60-minute interview at Trump Tower in mid-January, with Michael Gove of the Times of London and Kai Diekmann of Bild, Trump praised Brexit, criticized NATO as "obsolete", and the European Union as "basically a vehicle for Germany". He said it was a "very catastrophic mistake" on Angela Merkel's part to admit a million refugees—whom he refers to as "illegals". These "worrying declarations", among others, compelled the President of the European Council, Donald Tusk, to raise concerns in a letter to 27 European leaders, that the Trump administration seemed to "question the last 70 years of American foreign policy", placing the European Union in a "difficult situation".

==== Iran ====
There are no formal diplomatic relations between Iran and the United States. Iranian citizens were temporary banned from entering the United States by the executive order "Protecting the Nation From Foreign Terrorist Entry Into the United States." Late on April 18, 2017, the Trump Administration certified that Iran had continued to comply with the 2015 nuclear framework agreement. During his campaign, Trump had denounced the agreement as 'the worst deal ever' but was frustrated in his plans to renegotiate the nuclear deal as "canceling the deal would likely cause significant problems."

==== Israel ====
Israel's prime minister Benjamin Netanyahu and Trump held their first official visit at the White House on February 15. At the press conference, Trump urged Netanyahu to "'hold back' on building Jewish settlements on territories occupied by Israel in 1967 'for a little bit'". According to The Economist, Trump appeared to step back from the "long-standing, bipartisan American insistence that peace can be reached only through the establishment of a sovereign Palestinian state alongside the Jewish one", the two-state solution. Trump's priority of destroying the Muslim radicals of Islamic State (IS)" differs from Netanyahu's. Israel is more concerned about "containing Iran, the largest power in the Shia Muslim world. Given that Iran is itself fighting IS in Syria and Iraq, the two goals could even be in conflict." In a marked change from his visit to the White House under the Obama administration, Netanyahu blurred the distinction by "denouncing both IS and Iran in the same attack on 'militant Islam' and hailing Mr Trump's 'great courage' in tackling 'radical Islamic terror'".

==== Mexico ====
Since early in Trump's presidency, Mexico and United States faced a diplomatic crisis. Mexican President Enrique Peña Nieto opposes Trump's approach to the renegotiation of NAFTA and the implications of Trump's Executive Order 13767. After decades of cooperation between the two nations relations between the US and Mexico are seriously weakened.

==== North Korea ====
On February 12, North Korea tested a ballistic solid-fuel missile, the Pukkuksong-2, which is part of a series of missile tests that have largely defined the hostile North Korea–United States relations over recent years. According to The Economist, on February 13, while Trump promised "to deal with the 'big, big' problem of North Korea 'very strongly'", he has few options. Trump received the news of the launch during the first official visit of Japan's prime minister, Shinzo Abe. They were dining at Mar-a-Lago, Trump's Florida resort.

==== Russia ====
According to a Reuters report on February 9, 2017, in his first 60-minute telephone call with Putin, Putin inquired about extending New START (Strategic Arms Reduction Treaty) a nuclear arms reduction treaty between the United States and the Russia signed in 2010, which was expected to last until 2021. and, after ratification, Trump denounced the treaty claiming that it favored Russia and was "one of several bad deals negotiated by the Obama administration". The New York Times reported that on February 14, Russia deployed a new type of fully operational ground-launched intermediate-range cruise missile that "violates a landmark arms control treaty". The Americans have changed its name from SSC-X-8 to SSC-8, reflecting its status as "operational" not "X" referring to "in development".

On February 16, 2017, President Trump's Secretary of Defense, James Mattis, declared that the United States was not currently prepared to collaborate with Russia on military matters—including future anti-ISIL US operations.

On February 24, Trump "risked triggering a new Cold War-style arms race between Washington and Moscow. In an interview with Reuters, Trump said that the "treaty limiting Russian and U.S. nuclear arsenals was a bad deal for Washington" and he "would put the U.S. nuclear arsenal "at the top of the pack". In response, Russia's Konstantin Kosachev wrote on his Facebook page, "arguably Trump's most alarming statement on the subject of relations with Russia".

Trump's campaign slogan 'Make America great again', if that means nuclear supremacy, will return the world to the worst times of the arms race in the '50s and '60s.

— Konstantin Kosachev, Chair of the Foreign Affairs Committee of the Russian Federation Council February 24, 2017

Trump had "promised one of the 'greatest military buildups in American history' in a feisty, campaign-style speech extolling robust nationalism" at the annual Conservative Political Action Conference on February 24 at National Harbor.

==== Syria ====
On April 5, 2017, Trump responded to the April 4 chemical attack allegedly by Syrian Armed Forces on rebel-held Khan Shaykhun in Idlib Province, which enveloped men, women, and children in a suffocating fog of sarin gas, leaving more than eighty people dead and over three hundred more injured, saying that "... my attitude towards Syria and Assad has changed very much." Both Tillerson and Nikki Haley had previously stated that the Trump administration had no intention of interfering in President Bashar al-Assad's leadership in the Syrian Civil War, as the US focused on eliminating ISIS.

==== United Kingdom ====
In January 2017, the Prime Minister Theresa May invited Trump to a state visit to the UK when she met Trump in Washington DC. The visit was planned to occur in June, although it may be delayed to July to coincide with the upcoming G20 summit in Hamburg. Some sources have suggested that the UK government may delay the visit until after the House of Commons is in recess for the summer to avoid criticism from MPs. The Speaker of the House of Commons, John Bercow, stated on February 6, 2017, that Trump would not be welcome to address parliament during any future state visit, drawing applause and cheering from some Members of Parliament.

More than 1,860,000 people signed a petition to prevent Trump from making an official state visit, which states that such a visit "would cause embarrassment to Her Majesty the Queen". The FCO responded to this petition by stating that HM Government recognises the strong views expressed by the many signatories of this petition, but does not support this petition." Lord Ricketts, former Permanent Under-Secretary of State for Foreign Affairs, said that the unprecedented speed of May's invitation has put the Queen in a "very difficult situation". He questioned whether Trump was "specially deserving of this exceptional honour", given that US presidents are usually only invited to such visits after at least a year in office. Writing to May, opposition leader Jeremy Corbyn stated that the "invite should be withdrawn until the executive orders are gone".

It was suggested that Trump's visit would have to take place outside London, after Sir Bernard Hogan-Howe, the chief of the Metropolitan Police, said that he had concerns about the visit given the number of protests expected. One suggestion considered was for Trump to address a rally at the National Exhibition Centre in Birmingham, a city where 50.4% of voters voted to leave the EU, rather than London, which saw 59.9% voting to remain. Local politicians and activists in Birmingham promised to stage protests if the visit is moved, with Shabana Mahmood, Labour MP for the Birmingham Ladywood constituency, saying that "President Trump with his hateful and divisive rhetoric, policies and Muslim ban is not welcome here."

During a March 14 Fox & Friends interview, Andrew Napolitano said, "Three intelligence sources have informed Fox News that President Obama went outside the chain of command, using the British GCHQ to implement surveillance on Donald Trump to avoid leaving 'American fingerprints'." On March 16, Press Secretary Sean Spicer repeated Napolitano's claim at a White House press briefing. The following day, a GCHQ spokesperson called Napolitano's claim "utterly ridiculous". The White House denied reports that it had apologized to the British government for the accusation.

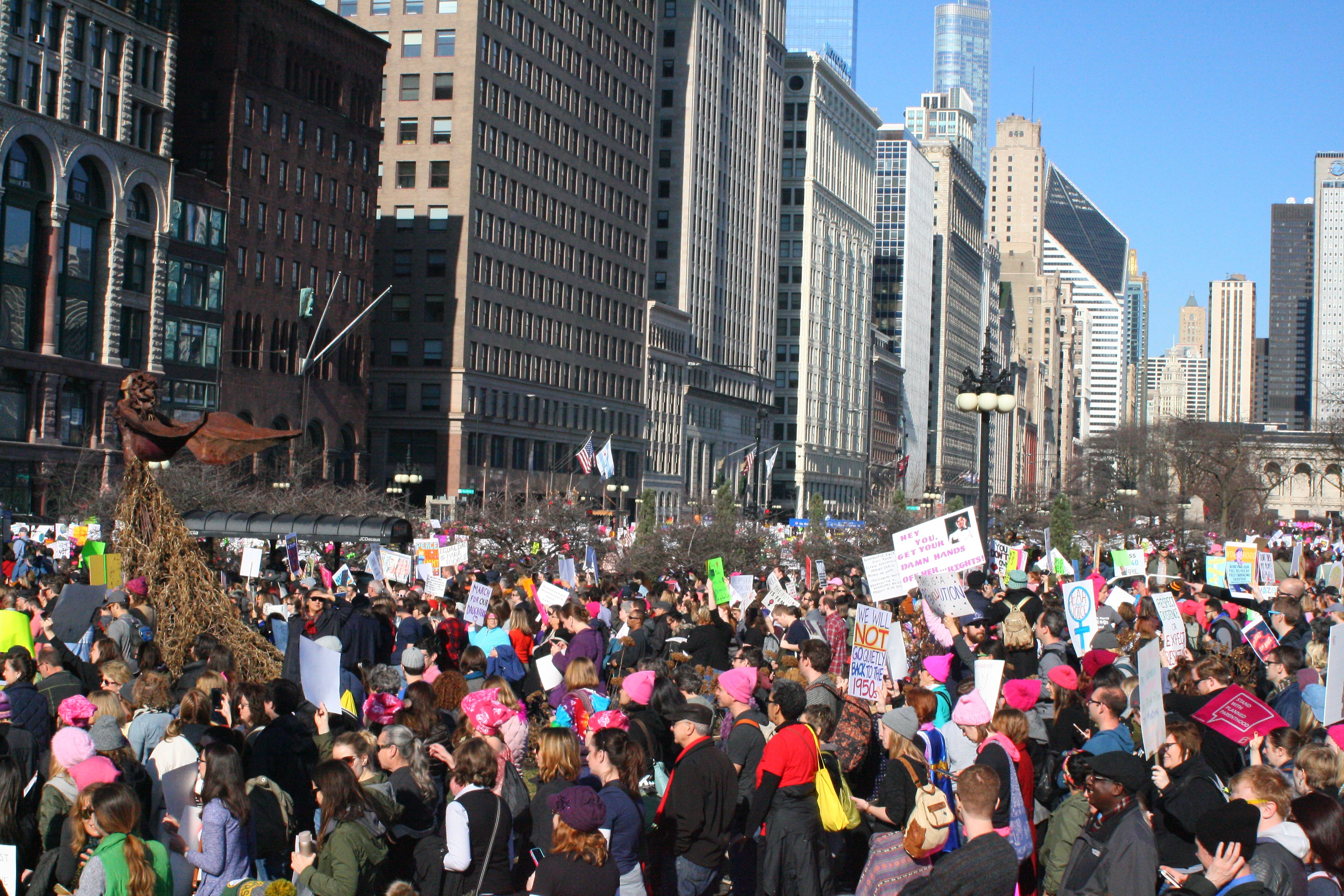
The 2017 Women's March in Chicago

== Government and Finance (G&F) ==
The G&F Division focuses on issues related to Congress, the executive and the judicial branches, the budget and appropriations, legislative process, homeland security, elections and certain financial issues such as public debt, inflation, savings, GDP, taxation and interest rates, banking, financial institutions, insurance and securities, public finance, fiscal and monetary policy, public debt, interest rates, gross domestic product, inflation and savings.

=== Supreme Court nomination ===
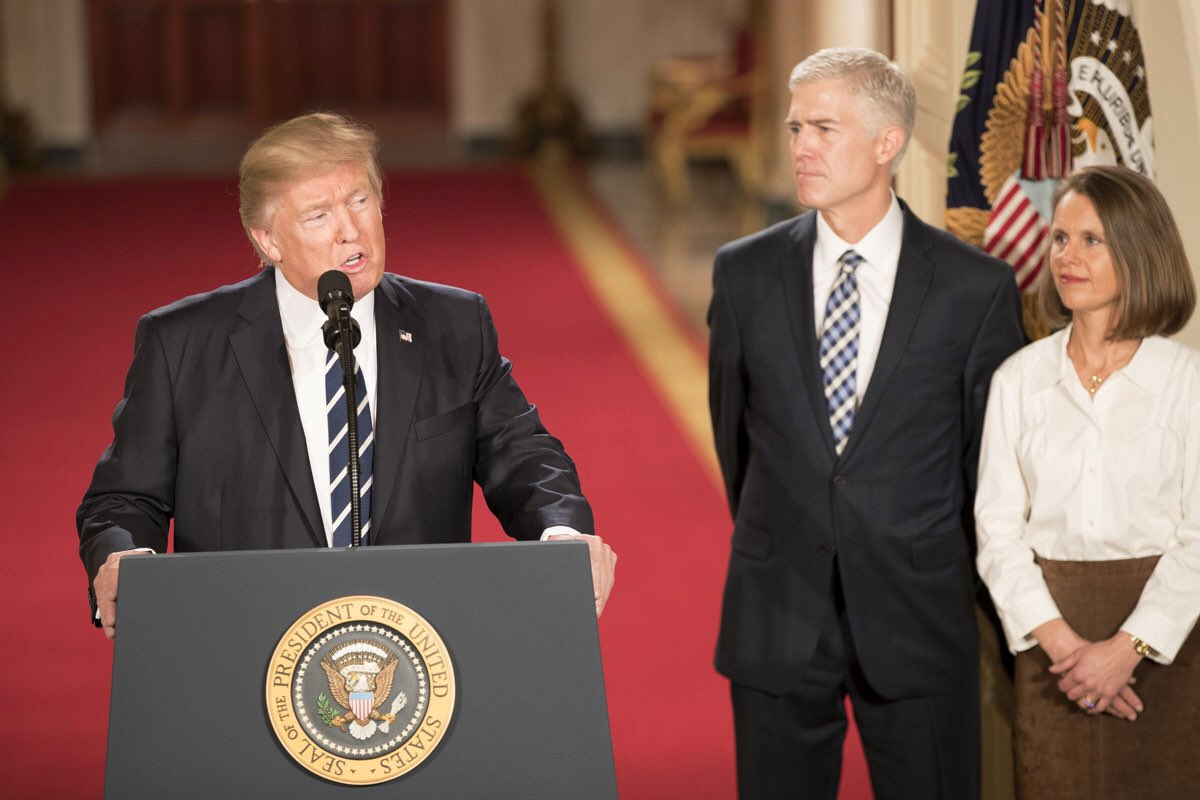
Judge Neil Gorsuch, his wife Louise, and President Donald Trump during the announcement in the East Room of the White House

On the evening of January 30, Trump announced his nomination of U.S. Appeals Court judge Neil Gorsuch for the Supreme Court fulfilling his campaign pledge that he would choose someone 'in the mold' of the late Justice Antonin Scalia.

Following the February 3 ruling by federal judge James Robart, which temporarily blocked Trump's travel ban on people from seven Muslim countries, Trump has been openly critical of the Federal judiciary. According to CNN and Washington Post, on February 8, Gorsuch expressed concern that Trump's remarks on the judiciary were 'demoralizing' and 'disheartening' to the independence of the judiciary.

Gorsuch was approved by the Senate Judiciary committee on April 3. Senate Republicans invoked the "nuclear option" after the April 6 filibuster that prevented cloture. After a year-long Republican block on nominations, the Senate confirmed Gorsuch's nomination with a 54–45 vote, mainly along party lines. Gorsuch took office in a private ceremony on April 10.

Hours after Gorsuch and four other Supreme Court conservatives justices voted on April 20 to deny a stay of execution request from eight inmates on Arkansas death-row, Ledell Lee was put to death with a lethal injection, the first in Arkansas since 2005. Two inmates—Jack Jones and Marcel Williams—received lethal injections on April 24.

=== Monetary policy ===
On April 19, in an interview with The Wall Street Journal—in a reversal of previous statements—Trump said he was considering keeping Janet Yellen as chair of the Federal Reserve System, which oversees the U.S. monetary policy. He explained that, "I do like a low-interest rate policy, I must be honest with you." In the same interview, Trump said he would not label China a currency manipulator, which had been one of his 100-day pledges. Trump expressed concerns in that interview that, "I think our dollar is getting too strong, and partially that's my fault because people have confidence in me. But that's hurting—that will hurt ultimately." He believes a low dollar favors the U.S. in international trade. From November 8, 2016—when Trump was elected—to December 30, 2016, the trade-weighted average of the foreign exchange value of the U.S. dollar (TWEXB) increased 4.4 percent. Towards the end of the first 100 days, the TWEXB had dropped two percent. This table shows some highs and lows of the Trade Weighted U.S. Dollar Index: Broad [TWEXB] from 2002 to April 2017.

Sample of trade weighted averages of foreign exchange value USD (highs/lows ) DMY
| February 20, 2002 | April 9, 2008 | July 23, 2011 | July 27, 2011 | March 18, 2015 | June 3, 2015 | February 17, 2016 | May 4, 2016 | 26-08-2016 | November 23, 2016 | 04-01-2017 | 19-04-2017 |
|---|---|---|---|---|---|---|---|---|---|---|---|
| 129.3639 | 95.6084 | 102.1682 | 94.0323 | 117.4927 | 115.5347 | 123.7823 | 118.6478 | 120.2955 | 127.2899 | 128.5246 | 124.0479 |

=== Small government ===
On January 23, President Trump signed an executive order that froze all federal hiring except for the military. The order specified that no new positions can be created and no currently vacant positions may be filled unless an agency head believes that the position is "necessary to meet national security or public safety responsibilities". The order is due to expire once the head of the Office of Management and Budget, Mick Mulvaney, creates a "long-term plan to reduce the size of the Federal Government's workforce through attrition".

On January 24, the Associated Press reported on emails from the Administration to some government agencies sent shortly after the inauguration, which "detailed specific prohibitions" banning certain government agencies, such as the Agricultural Research Service Agriculture Department from issuing "press releases, blog updates or posts to the agency's social media accounts". In what the Associated Press described as a "broader communications clampdown within the executive branch", the Administration "instituted a media blackout". In his January 25 press briefing, White House press secretary Sean Spicer claimed that the emails did not come from the Administration: "They haven't been directed by us to do anything ... That directive did not come from here."

On January 23, in a Presidential Memorandum, the president ordered a temporary government-wide hiring freeze of the civilian work force in the executive branch, which is managed by the Office of Personnel Management. This will prevent federal agencies, except for the offices of the new presidential appointees, national security, the military and public safety, from filling vacant positions. The Brookings Institution questioned whether this freeze would include financial regulators who exercise independence from the executive branch—such as the Federal Reserve Board of Governors (Fed), Office of the Comptroller of the Currency (OCC), the Securities and Exchange Commission (SEC) among others. In a Fox News report, based on statistics from the Office of Personnel Management, the number of executive branch employees "hasn't been this low since 1965" and has been "more or less steady" since 2001.

=== Economic policy of Donald Trump ===
Trump's key economic policies included the dismantling of the Dodd–Frank Wall Street Reform and Consumer Protection Act, and the repeal of the Patient Protection and Affordable Care Act (ACA).

According to the April 28, 2017, Commerce Department report, in the first quarter of 2017, there was a "sharp decline from the 2.1% in Q1 2016 to 0.7% in Q1 2017—representing the weakest quarterly economic growth in three years. The report presents a statistical analysis of the American economy in the 2017 Q1—the gross domestic product (GDP). In spite of the soft GDP, by the end of Q1 2017, the S&P 500 was near an all-time high, representing a 12% rise from the first quarter of 2016, as investor confidence remained elevated based on Trump's promise to cut taxes, deregulate and spend heavily on infrastructure such as roads and bridges.

Unemployment in the United States 2009–2016. Jobless rate was 4.5 in March 2017.

In March 2017, the unemployment rate fell to 4.5 percent and the Consumer Sentiment Index reached 125.6, a level of consumer confidence in the United States last seen in December 2000. It fell to 120.3 in April. Consumer confidence or soft data contrasted with real consumer spending or hard data, with a "big drop-off" in the amount Americans actually spent during Trump's first 100 days.

Consumer confidence index
| 04-2016 | 05-2016 | 06-2016 | 07-2016 | 08-2016 | 09-2016 | 10-2016 | 11-2016 | 12-2016 | 01-2017 | 02-2017 | 03-2017 | 04-2017 |
|---|---|---|---|---|---|---|---|---|---|---|---|---|
| 94.7 | 92.4 | 97.4 | 96.7 | 101.8 | 103.5 | 100.8 | 109.4 | 113.3 | 111.6 | 116.1 | 124.9 | 120.3 |

Real Personal Consumption Expenditures
| 06-2009 | 06-2010 | 06-2011 | 06-2012 | 06-2013 | 06-2014 | 06-2015 | 06-2016 | 12-2016 | 01-2017 | 02-2017 |
|---|---|---|---|---|---|---|---|---|---|---|
| 9,801.1 | 10,021.2 | 10,248.3 | 10,390.3 | 10,543.8 | 10,851.8 | 11,199.2 | 11,522.2 | 11,709.4 | 11,684.8 | 11,676.1 |

==== Changes to Dodd–Frank Wall Street Reform and Consumer Protection Act ====
On February 3, after a meeting with his strategic and policy forum, which included Jamie Dimon, Chairman and CEO JPMorgan Chase, Trump issued an Executive Order, Core Principles for Regulating the United States Financial System, which directed the "Treasury secretary to submit a report on recommended changes to bank regulations in 120 days." Trump wants to get "banks to lend money more aggressively" and wants to make changes to the Dodd–Frank Wall Street Reform and Consumer Protection Act (2010) which was enacted in response to the Great Recession, bringing significant changes to U. S. financial regulation.

We expect to be cutting a lot out of Dodd-Frank ... Frankly, I have so many people, friends of mine, that have nice businesses that can't borrow money. They just can't get any money because the banks won't let them borrow because of rules and regulations in Dodd-Frank.

— Trump in meeting with his business advisory council, February 3

In an interview on February 3, with The Wall Street Journal, Trump's National Economic Council Director, Gary Cohn, announced the planned rollback of the fiduciary rule, which stated that brokers and advisers who work with tax-advantaged retirement savings "must work in the best interest of their clients" even at the expense of their own profits.

=== Deregulation ===
One of the first acts by the Trump administration was an order signed by Chief of Staff Reince Priebus on January 20, under the subject "Regulatory Freeze Pending Review" to all Heads of Executive Departments and Agencies ordering agencies to immediately suspend all pending regulations and to "send no regulation" to the Office of Information and Regulatory Affairs (OFR) until the Trump administration can review them except for "emergency situations" or "urgent circumstances" allowed by the Director or Acting Director, Mark Sandy, of the Office of Management and Budget (OMB). This was comparable to prior moves by the Obama and Bush administrations shortly after their inaugurations to revert executive orders by outgoing presidents, signed in their final days in office.

On January 30, Trump signed his seventh Executive Order "Reducing Regulation and Controlling Regulatory Costs".

==== Deregulation and corporations ====
At a January 23 meeting with leaders of the United States' largest corporations, including Ford's Mark Fields, Dell Technologies' Michael Dell, Lockheed Martin's Marillyn Hewson, Under Armour's Kevin Plank, Arconic's Klaus Kleinfeld, Whirlpool's Jeff Fettig, Johnson & Johnson's Alex Gorsky, Dow Chemical's Andrew Liveris, U.S. Steel's Mario Longhi, SpaceX's Elon Musk, International Paper's Mark Sutton, and Corning's Wendell Weeks promised to reward the companies who stay in the United States with aggressive cuts on U.S. federal regulations governing their companies by "75 percent or more".

===== Trump meets with CEOs of pharmaceutical companies =====
On January 31, Trump met with CEOs of pharmaceutical firms, including Novartis's Joseph Jimenez who also represented the Pharmaceutical Research and Manufacturers of America—the pharmaceutical industry's powerful lobbying group, Merck & Co.'s Kenneth Frazier, Johnson & Johnson, Celgene's Robert Hugin, Eli Lilly, Amgen's Robert Bradway. Trump called for lower prices, "We have no choice. For Medicare, for Medicaid. We have to get the prices way down." In return, he promised to boost the pharmaceutical companies competitiveness by curbing regulations "from 9,000 pages" to "100 pages", and by lowering pharmaceutical companies' tax rates. Trump noted that Food and Drug Administration (FDA) approvals "force pharmaceutical companies to spend years and billions of dollars developing drugs". He promised his nomination for FDA Commissioner would oversee an FDA overhaul. In the listening session with pharmaceutical industry leaders, Trump noted that, "it costs sometimes $2.5 billion on average, actually, to come up with a new product. ... 15 years, $2.5 billion to come up with a product where there's not even a safety problem. So it's crazy. I'm surprised you can't get them to move faster than that."

Trump had promised in March 2016, to reform the pharmaceutical industry, including the removal of existing free market barriers to allow imported, dependable, safe, reliable, and cheaper drugs from overseas, bringing more options to American consumers. Following Trump's press conference on January 11, Fortune claimed that the largest pharmaceutical companies had lost over $20 billion in 20 minutes. The Medicare Prescription Drug, Improvement, and Modernization Act (2003) expressly prohibited Medicare from negotiating bulk prescription drug prices and Trump had pledged to revert this. Following the morning meeting with CEOs on January 31, Trump abandoned his pledge to allow "Medicare negotiate bulk discounts in the price it pays for prescription drugs."

=== Limitations on executive agency members lobbying ===
On January 28, Trump signed an Executive Order to fulfilling his campaign pledge to limit lobbying of executive agency members.

=== Department of Justice ===
On February 8, Alabama Senator Jeff Sessions, who was nominated by Trump in January, was confirmed as United States Attorney General (A.G.), the head of the Justice Department per 28 U.S.C. § 503. He is the United States government's chief law enforcement officer and lawyer with 113,000 employees working under his leadership. According to The Washington Post, Sessions' "conservative, populist views have shaped many" of Trump's "early policies, including on immigration". The nomination battle was described by The New York Times, as "a bitter and racially charged". The confirmation process for Trump's nominee Senator Jeff Sessions was described as " strikingly contentious" by The New York Times; with Fox News calling it a "wild night", and CNN calling the "rare rebuke" a "stunning moment" as Senator Mitch McConnell invoked Rule XIX to silence Senator Elizabeth Warren for the rest of the hearing. McConnell interrupted Warren as she read several pages by Coretta Scott King and Senator Ted Kennedy regarding Session's alleged racial bias from the 500-plus page transcript submitted in 1986, that contributed to the decision by the then-Republican-led Judiciary Committee to reject his nomination to a federal judgeship. Warren immediately live-streamed her reading of the letter, critical of Sessions, that the widow of Martin Luther King Jr. had written to Senator Strom Thurmond in 1986. and numerous media outlets made the full-text available.

Trump appointed Dana J. Boente to serve as acting Attorney General until Session's Senate Confirmation. After firing Yates, Trumped signed his eleventh Executive Order 13775 on February 9, specifically reversing the DOJ's line of succession in Obama's EO 13762 in order to appoint the United States Attorney for the Eastern District of Virginia—Dana J. Boente—as Acting Attorney General. Trump revoked EO 13775 on March 31 with "Presidential Executive Order on Providing an Order of Succession Within the Department of Justice.

Boente had replaced Acting Attorney General Sally Yates who was fired by Trump for ordering the Justice Department to not defend Trump's Executive Order 13769 which restricted entry to the United States. Yates claimed that, "At present, I am not convinced that the defense of the executive order is consistent with these responsibilities [of the Department of Justice], nor am I convinced that the executive order is lawful".

=== Voter fraud claims ===
Since November 2016, and during his presidency, Trump has repeated voter fraud allegations that between three and five million people voted illegally and cost him the popular vote to Hillary Clinton, and also that thousands of voters were illegally bused from Massachusetts into New Hampshire where former Senator Kelly Ayotte was defeated, and where Trump narrowly lost to Clinton in 2016.

Trump had announced on January 25 that he was conducting an investigation into voter fraud. He repeated unsubstantiated claims about the number of fraudulent voters and referred to VoteStand founder Gregg Phillips, who could not produce any evidence of voter fraud. In January, US News reported that members of Trump's cabinet and family were registered to vote in multiple states. On February 10, Federal Election Commission (FEC) Commissioner Ellen L. Weintraub issued a statement calling on Trump to provide the evidence of what would "constitute thousands of felony criminal offenses under New Hampshire law." By February 12, Stephen Miller was still unable to provide concrete evidence to support claims of voter fraud in an interview with Stephanopoulos, but he seemed to direct Stephanopoulos to the often-cited 2012 Pew Research Center study. In fact, the 2012 Pew report entitled "Inaccurate, Costly, and Inefficient Evidence That America's Voter Registration System Needs an Upgrade," which was based on 2008 data, was about "outdated voter rolls, not fraudulent votes" and "makes no mention of noncitizens voting or registering to vote." The report showed that because of inefficiencies in the voter system, 24 percent of eligible citizens were not able to be registered, representing "51 million citizens." Problems related to voter registration often affected "military personnel—especially those deployed overseas and their families—who were almost twice as likely to report registration problems as was the general public in 2008." In November, "the former director of Pew's election program" explained, "We found millions of out of date registration records due to people moving or dying, but found no evidence that voter fraud resulted." On January 25, Spicer confirmed in a press briefing that Trump continued to believe that "millions voted illegally in the election" based on "studies and evidence that people have presented him." This included an often-cited and contested 2014 Old Dominion University study entitled "Do non-citizens vote in U.S. elections?" Using Cooperative Congressional Election Study data from 2008 and 2010, the researchers had argued that more than 14% of non-citizens "indicated that they were registered to vote."

=== 2018 United States federal budget ===
Trump submitted his first budget request which recommends funding levels for the next fiscal year 2018—covering the period from October 1, 2017, to September 30, 2018—to the 115th Congress. Trump's request including a $639 billion defense budget and corresponding major cuts to other federal departments.

To avert a possible government shutdown, the Trump administration face an April 28 deadline—the expiration of the December 10, 2016, continuing resolution (H.R. 2028) (Public Law 114-254). (Note: The President's budget is formulated with the Office of Management and Budget (OMB), currently led by Mick Mulvaney. According to the rules and legislation governing the federal budget process, annual funding bills—appropriations bill—are submitted annually and have to be passed through Congress and the Senate and then signed by the President. Budget resolutions are under the jurisdiction of the United States House Committee on Appropriations and the United States Senate Committee on Appropriations) Discussion time on controversial issues, such as funding for a border wall and defunding Planned Parenthood, was limited by the two-week Easter recess that began on April 7. The government was shut down during the Clinton and Obama administrations as a result of clashes between Republicans in Congress and Democrats in the White House. In late April 2017, Republicans have control of both Congress and the White House. A shutdown would result in "government agencies [locking] their doors, national parks [refusing] visitors and federal workers [being] told not to report to work". The appropriations process cannot be accomplished without consulting the Democrats—unlike rolling back federal regulations with Congressional Review Acts and attempts to repeal Obamacare.

=== Tax reform ===
The White House memo entitled "2017 Tax Reform for Economic Growth and American Jobs" was presented on April 26 in what The Wall Street Journal described as his "finest moment" in the first 100 days and a policy and political success. Individual reform includes "reducing the 7 tax brackets to 3 tax brackets for 10%, 25% and 35%, doubling the standard deduction, providing tax relief for families with child and dependent care expenses." The taxation system will be simplified to "eliminate targeted tax breaks that mainly benefit the wealthiest taxpayers, protect the home ownership and charitable gift tax deductions, repeal the Alternative Minimum Tax, repeal the death tax and repeal the 3.8% Obamacare tax that hits small businesses and investment income." Business reform includes "15% business tax rate, territorial tax system to level the playing field for American companies, one-time tax on trillions of dollars held overseas and elimination of tax breaks for special interests." The memo did not provide legislative content but rather broad outlines that will be developed in Congress but may face some opposition from both sides.

== Energy, environmental, and science policy ==
=== Climate change ===
Trump rescinded many Obama-era regulations aimed at cutting the volume of greenhouse gas emissions, which faced strong opposition and legal challenges. The key focus of his deregulatory efforts was the Clean Power Plan created under the Obama administration, which restricted GHG emissions at coal-fired plants. Trump proposed defunding the Clean Power Plan in his FY2018 budget, and his March 28 executive order directed Environmental Protection Agency administrator Scott Pruitt to review the Clean Power Plan. He also lifted a 14-month-old halt on new coal leases on federal lands.

=== Dakota Access and Keystone XL pipelines ===
On January 24, Trump signed three Presidential Memoranda regarding construction of pipelines; "Regarding Construction of American Pipelines" was his fifth memoranda, "Regarding Construction of the Dakota Access Pipeline" was his sixth and the seventh was "Regarding Construction of the Keystone XL Pipeline". These were intended to "clear the way to government approval" of the Dakota Access and the Keystone XL pipelines. In a meeting with small business leaders on January 30, Trump clarified that one of the reasons for approving the pipelines was to insist that pipeline makers implement a made-in-America approach. He revealed how the federal government could exercise eminent domain strategically in the appropriation of private land, to pressure pipeline makers to use American raw steel, for example.

=== Deregulation on environmental policies and programs ===
Then White House Chief of Staff Reince Priebus signed an order on January 24, temporarily delaying the Environmental Protection Agency's (EPA) 30 final regulations that were pending in the Federal Register until March 21, 2017. Employees in the EPA's Office of Acquisition Management, received an email "within hours of President Trump's swearing in", from the new EPA administration, asking "that all contract and grant awards be temporarily suspended, effective immediately" which included "task orders and work assignments" until "further clarification".

On February 1, the Trump administration published a Statement of Administration Policy to allow coal companies to dump mining waste in streams by nullifying the Department of the Interior regulation known as the "Stream Protection Rule", established in the Obama administration. Under the Congressional Review Act Congress passed the resolution to repeal on February 1 and the Senate also approved it on February 2. The Statement nullified the Waste Prevention, Production Subject to Royalties, and Resource Conservation which limited venting, flaring, and leaks during oil and natural gas production. The Repeal of Stream Protection Rule (115-5) was signed into law by Trump on February 16.

Additionally, the February 1 policy statement nullified the rule on Disclosure of Payments by Resource Extraction Issuers, a Securities and Exchange Commission regulation which required resource extraction issuers to report payments "to governments for the commercial development of oil, natural gas or minerals". The Repeal of the Disclosure of Payments by Resource Extraction Issuers Rule (115-4) was signed into law by Trump on February 14, 2017.

On March 29, 2017, EPA Administrator Scott Pruitt overturned the 2015 EPA revocation and denied the 2007 administrative petition by the Natural Resources Defense Council and the Pesticide Action Network North America (PANNA) to ban the widely used Dow Chemical Company's chlorpyrifos. The eight-year delay by the EPA to respond to PANNA, had resulted in a court case, PANNA v. EPA, in which EPA was ordered to respond by October 2015. EPA revoked "all tolerances for the insecticide chlorpyrifos" and Pruitt overturned the 2015 decision.

On March 29, 2017, EPA Administrator Scott Pruitt overturned the 2015 EPA revocation and denied the administrative petition by the Natural Resources Defense Council and the Pesticide Action Network North America to ban chlorpyrifos.

By reversing the previous administration's steps to ban one of the most widely used pesticides in the world, we are returning to using sound science in decision-making—rather than predetermined results.

— Statement by Scott Pruitt, EPA, Administrator March 29, 2017

Accompanied by coal executives and coal miners, Trump signed a "sweeping executive order" on March 28, at the EPA. In his remarks he praised coal miners along with pipelines and U.S. manufacturing and addressed the coal miners directly, "Come on, fellas. Basically, you know what this is? You know what it says, right? You're going back to work." Trump instructed EPA "regulators to rewrite key rules curbing U.S. carbon emissions and other environmental regulations."

== Acts of the 115th United States Congress ==
By April 10, Trump had signed 21 Acts of Congress into law under the 115th United States Congress—laws 115-2 through 115–22. The GAO Access and Oversight Act of 2017 (Pub. L. 115–3 (text) (PDF),H.R. 72) was the second law Trump signed as president. The bill ensures that the Government Accountability Office (GAO) has full access to the database, National Directory of New Hires, to ensure that recipients of federal means-tested programs like Unemployment Insurance, Supplemental Nutrition Assistance Program (SNAP), Earned income tax credit (EITC), and Temporary Assistance for Needy Families (TANF) are eligible, thereby reducing government waste and increasing accountability.

=== Congressional Review Act ===
Beginning in January, the Trump administration used the 1996 Congressional Review Act (CRA) to overturn regulations—some of them major—finalized during the final months of Obama's tenure. By April 6, Trump had signed into law 11 resolutions of disapproval under the CRA, after they were passed by the Republican majority in the House and Senate. Under the Congressional Review Act, Congress can circumvent the Senate's filibuster to overturn legislation issued in the last 60 days of the previous administration.

On February 14, the Repeal of the Disclosure of Payments by Resource Extraction Issuers Rule (Pub. L. 115–4 (text) (PDF), H.J.Res. 41) was signed, nullifying the Securities and Exchange Commission regulation known as the "Disclosure of Payments by Resource Extraction Issuers" rule. The SEC regulation was mandated by the Dodd-Frank Wall Street Reform and Consumer Protection Act, which was similar to transparency initiatives adopted by the European Union and Canada. Advocates argued that "Disclosure of Payments" rule prevented companies from bribing foreign governments and engaging in other forms of corruption. Those who argued for its repeal claimed that rule had placed an excessive burden on American companies and created a competitive disadvantage.

On February 16, Trump signed the Repeal of Stream Protection Rule (H.J.Res. 38 Pub. L. 115–5 (text) (PDF)), which nullified the DOI regulation known as the Stream Protection Rule.

On February 28, the Repeal of the Implementation of the NICS Improvement Amendments Act of 2007 (H.J.Res. 40 Pub. L. 115–8 (text) (PDF)) was signed into law, which overturned the Social Security Administration related to the implementation of the NICS Improvement Amendments Act of 2007, which had amended the National Instant Criminal Background Check System to prohibit those with severe mental illness from possessing firearms.

On March 27, Trump overturned the Bureau of Land Management's (BLM), which nullified the "Waste Prevention, Production Subject to Royalties, and Resource Conservation", also known as "Methane and Waste Prevention" or "methane venting and flaring rule" which "limited venting, flaring, and leaks during oil and natural gas production". with Bill (H.J.Res. 44 Pub. L. 115–11 (text) (PDF)) disapproved the DOI rule relating to Bureau of Land Management "regulations that established the procedures used to prepare, revise, or amend land use plans pursuant to the Federal Land Policy and Management Act of 1976". On the same day, he signed the "H.J.Res.37—Disapproving the rule submitted by the Department of Defense, the General Services Administration, and the National Aeronautics and Space Administration relating to the Federal Acquisition Regulation" (H.J.Res. 37 Pub. L. 115–11 (text) (PDF)), which overturned the Federal Acquisition Regulation (FAR) "Fair Pay and Safe Workplaces"—known by its opponents as the "Blacklisting" Rule. On March 27, he also signed the ED State and Local Education Accountability Rules (H.J.Res. 57 Pub. L. 115–13 (text) (PDF)), which overruled the Department of Education rule relating to accountability and State plans under the Elementary and Secondary Education Act of 1965 and the ED Teacher Preparation Rule (H.J.Res. 58 Pub. L. 115–14 (text) (PDF)), overturning the Department of Education relating to teacher preparation issues.

On March 31, Trump signed the DOL Unemployment Insurance Drug Testing Rule (H.J.Res. 42 Pub. L. 115–17 (text) (PDF)) "disapproving the DOL rule relating to drug testing of unemployment compensation applicants."

Trump also signed the DOL Employee Retirement Income Security Act ERISA Exemption for State-Run Retirement Plans Rule and the DOL ERISA Exemption for Municipality-Run Retirement Plans Rules.

On April 3, Trump signed the Occupational Safety and Health Administration (OSHA) "Volks" Rule measure (115-21 Pub. L. 115–21 (text) (PDF)) which overturned the DOL "Clarification of Employer's Continuing Obligation to Make and Maintain an Accurate Record of Each Recordable Injury and Illness" enacted in December 2016. On the same day he signed Public Law 115-22 which overturned the December 2, 2016 FCC Privacy Rule relating to "Protecting the Privacy of Customers of Broadband and Other Telecommunications Services" and the Fish and Wildlife Service (FWS) Wildlife Management Rule (H.J.Res. 69 Pub. L. 115–20 (text) (PDF)) overturning DOI rule relating to "Non-Subsistence Take of Wildlife, and Public Participation and Closure Procedures, on National Wildlife Refuges in Alaska." Privacy advocates expressed concern that Internet service providers (ISPs)—including the largest ISPs, Comcast, Verizon, AT&T, Time Warner, Cox Communications, and CenturyLink Charter Communications and others— will create and monetize detailed customer data such as Internet search history and without consent. Supporters included Republicans who regarded the rule as executive overreach and trade groups that represent Internet service providers.

On April 13, Trump signed the law which overturned the HHS Title X Funding for Planned Parenthood Rule.

== Speech to a joint session of Congress ==
The 45th President of the United States, Donald Trump, gave his first public address before a joint session of the United States Congress on February 28, 2017. Trump announced the creation of the Office of Victims of Immigration Crime Engagement (VOICE).

== Protests ==
Protests against Donald Trump have occurred both in the United States and worldwide, following Donald Trump's 2016 presidential campaign, his electoral college victory, and through his first inauguration.

On January 21, there were large demonstrations protesting Trump worldwide in 673 cities, with estimates for the global total at approximately five million people. About half a million demonstrated in the Women's March on Washington (in Washington, D.C.).

Day Without Immigrants 2017 and Not My Presidents Day were held on February 16 and 20, respectively. Later protests included the Tax Day March (April 15), March for Science (April 22), and People's Climate Mobilization (April 29).

== Rallies ==
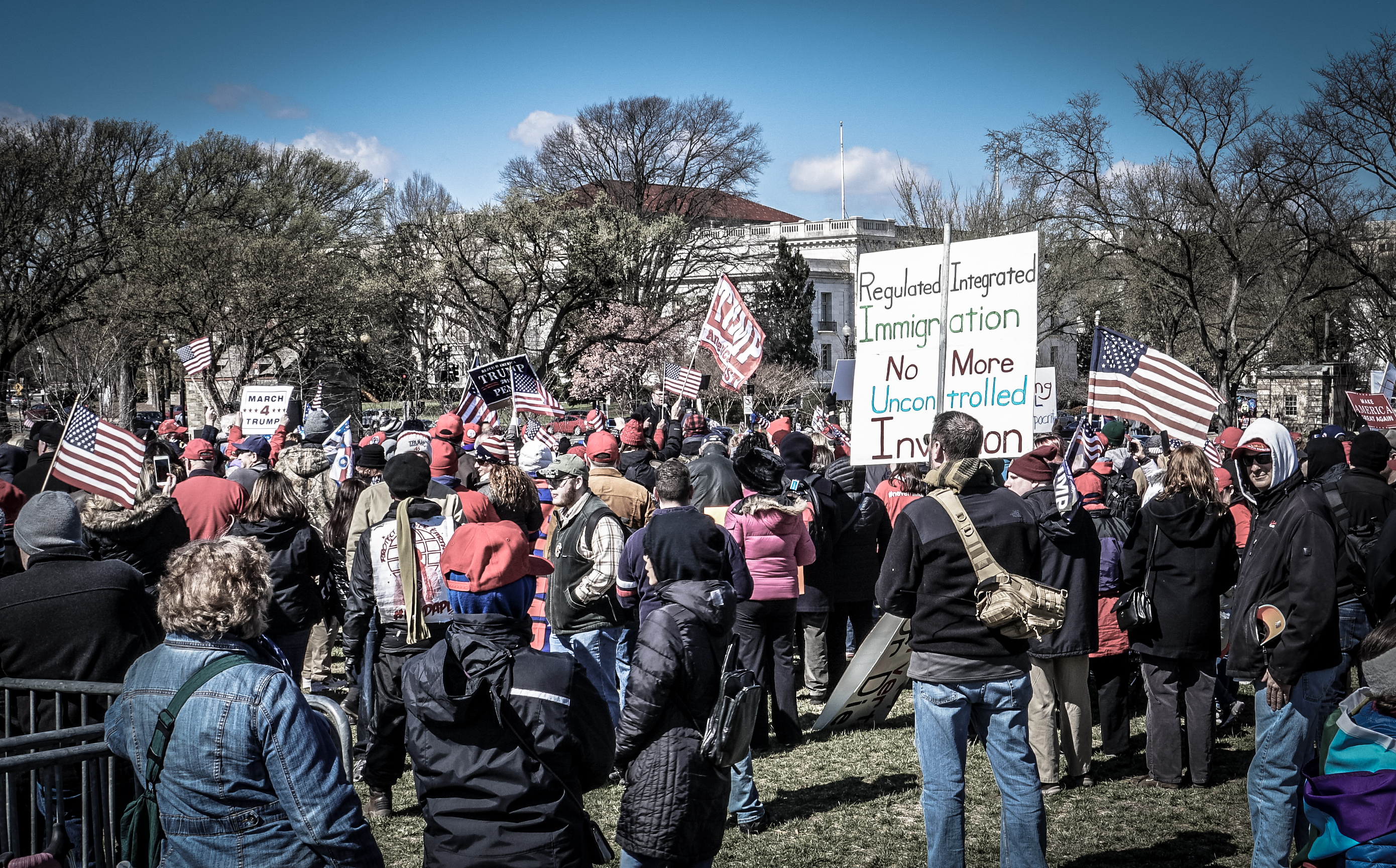
March 4 Trump support rally in Washington, D.C.

March 4 Trump rallies, organized by Trump supporters, were held throughout the United States on March 4.

== Media coverage ==
On February 16, 2017, Trump held an hour-and-a-quarter-long press conference to "update the American people on the incredible progress that has been made in the last four weeks since my inauguration." CNN described it as an "animated and unorthodox" intervention in which Trump appeared to be "deeply frustrated" by the way he was being portrayed by the media. The media has often described the administration as chaotic, while Trump claimed it was "running like a fine-tuned machine". Trump said that "the stock market has hit record numbers ... there has been a tremendous surge of optimism in the business world, and ... a new Rasmussen Reports' poll which put his "approval rating at 55 percent and going up". Trump dismissed polls that gave lower numbers, such as those by Gallup and Pew Research Center, which reported 40% and 39%, respectively. When asked by an Associated Press journalist about Trump's performance at the press conference, Trump's supporters said he came across as the "champion of Middle America ... taking on the establishment and making good on his campaign promises to put the country first."

NBC News, The Huffington Post/YouGov, Gallup, SurveyMonkey, Rasmussen Reports, the Associated Press/NORC, Pew Research Center, Quinnipiac University, The Economist/YouGov,The Wall Street Journal, Reuters/Ipsos, and ABC News/The Washington Post are among the organizations undertaking opinion polls on Trump's approval ratings.

An April meeting of thirty White House staff members—including Communications Director, Mike Dubke, Jessica Ditto, and Kellyanne Conway—brainstormed on how to "repackage" the symbolic First 100 Days—which ends April 29—and to "rebrand Trump" by focusing on three main areas—prosperity, accountability and safety. The first includes "new manufacturing jobs, reduced regulations and pulling out of the Trans-Pacific Partnership trade deal", the second "swamp-draining campaign promises such as lobbying restrictions" and the third "the dramatic reduction in border crossings and the strike in Syria". Politico summarized this period as "marred by legislative stumbles, legal setbacks, senior staff kneecapping one another, the resignation of his national security adviser and near-daily headlines and headaches about links to Russia." CNN called it "largely win-less", The Atlantic described its as a "disaster" marked by "chaos, confusion, and infighting" comparing it to Bill Clinton's in 1993. The Washington Times claimed the numerous mainstream media descriptions of Trump's "worst 100 days" failed to mention the accomplishments: the TPP withdrawal, the Keystone XL and Dakota Access Pipelines approvals, the proposed "streamlined budget" with a "Reagan-era increase to national defense", immigration laws enforcement "which decreased illegal border crossing by 40 percent in his first month", and Gorsuch's "incredibly smooth" nomination to the Supreme Court, the Dow Jones 20,000-point threshold, and rebounding manufacturing and mining jobs".

=== Sean Spicer ===
Sean Spicer was named as Trump's White House Press Secretary on December 22, 2016, and his Communications Director on December 24. after the resignation of Jason Miller. At his first official press conference, on January 21, Spicer criticized the media for underestimating the size of the crowds at the inauguration under Trump's direct orders.

On February 1, Spicer held his sixth press briefing, which for the first time included a number of Skype Seats as Chuck Todd had suggested on January 23. Spicer fielded questions from Kim Kalunian (WPRI) in Rhode Island, Natalie Herbick (Fox 8) in Cleveland, Ohio, Lars Larson of the Lars Larson Show and Jeff Jobe of Jeff Jobe Publishing, South Central Kentucky. CBS NEWS reported that some journalists labelled their questions as "softball", others welcomed them. Spicer had also delivered a tense five-minute post-inauguration news conference on January 21. The Skype solution helped resolve a concern about moving to a larger press room. By February 13, Jim Hoft, from Gateway Pundit and the "freshly minted White House correspondent", 28-year-old artist Lucian Wintrich, were granted White House press credentials and attended the press conference with Trump and the Canadian prime minister, Justin Trudeau.

On February 4, Melissa McCarthy lampooned Spicer on Saturday Night Live. On February 7, CNN reported that "President Donald Trump was disappointed with Spicer and with Priebus, who had recommended him.

On February 24, journalists from The New York Times, The Los Angeles Times, CNN and Politico, The Los Angeles Times, and BuzzFeed were barred from Sean Spicer's small, off-camera press briefing or "gaggle", held in his office. Conservative-leaning Breitbart News, One America News Network, and The Washington Times were invited along with Fox News, Reuters, Bloomberg News, CBS and Hearst Communications. Reporters from the Associated Press and Time walked out of the briefing in protest. Media outlets allowed into the gaggle shared full details of the briefing, including their audio, with the entire press corps. Fox News "joined a complaint by the chair of the five-network television pool", although their journalist was not banned. The White House Communications Agency (WHCA) lodged a complaint. Spicer explained that the White House is fighting against "unfair coverage".

I think we're going to aggressively push back. We're just not going to sit back and let false narratives, false stories, inaccurate facts get out there.

— Sean Spicer on barring media from February 24 "gaggle"

On April 11, while defending President Trump's decision to bomb Syria, Spicer compared President Bashar al-Assad to Adolf Hitler and stated that even Hitler had not used chemical weapons on his own people during World War II, ignoring the Germany's use of gas chambers during the Holocaust. Spicer apologized on the next day, saying, "I got into a topic that I shouldn't have, and I screwed up."

=== Kellyanne Conway ===
By February 3, televised interviews by Kellyanne Conway, Counselor to the President, were dominating the news cycle in the First 100 Days, according to the Washington Post claiming it was partly because of "misconstrued facts" and "falsehoods". Examples include the February 2 interview on Hardball with Chris Matthews, where she cited a fictitious incident involving two Iraqi refugees in Kentucky in 2011, who she claimed were the masterminds behind the Bowling Green massacre, which she claimed was "brand new information" that had "very little [media] coverage".

Conway promoted Ivanka Trump's business On February 9, on Fox & Friends in response to Nordstrom's decision to drop her products. Organizations filed formal ethics complaints against Conway for violating federal law prohibiting use of a federal position "for the endorsement of any product, service or enterprise". Public Citizen asked the Office of Governmental Ethics (OGE) to investigate and Citizens for Responsibility and Ethics in Washington filed a similar complaint.

== Investigations into Russian interference in the election ==
Three separate investigations on Russian interference in the 2016 United States elections include those undertaken by the FBI, the Senate Intelligence Committee and the House Intelligence Committee.

On March 20, in a House Intelligence Committee public hearing FBI Director James Comey confirmed that the FBI has been conducting a broad counter-intelligence investigation of Russian interference in the elections starting in July 2016, which includes investigations into possible links between Trump associates and Russia. Comey stated that the FBI has no evidence that corroborates Trump's March 4 wiretapping claim. On March 22, Devin Nunes, Republican chairman of the committee, held a press conference to reveal that, based on classified reports he had seen, U.S. intelligence agencies had incidentally collected communications of Trump's transition team, and that Trump associates' names were unmasked in the reports.

The next House Intelligence Committee hearings will be closed and will include NSA Director Mike Rogers and Comey. Nunes canceled the public hearing with "former Acting Attorney General Sally Yates, former CIA Director John Brennan, and former Director of National Intelligence James Clapper". On April 6, 2017, Nunes temporarily recused himself from the Russia investigation, as the House Ethics Committee began investigating claims that he improperly disclosed classified information. He called the allegations "entirely false". Mike Conaway (R-TX) replaced Nunes to lead the investigation.

== Re-election campaign ==
Trump filed a form with the Federal Election Commission declaring his eligibility to run for re-election in 2020 within hours of his taking office. The first rally paid for by the campaign took place at the Melbourne Orlando International Airport near Orlando, Florida, on February 18, 2017. The campaign rally was the earliest such event by any incumbent U.S. president in history. During the event, Trump defended his actions as president and criticized the media.

== See also ==
- Political positions of Donald Trump
- First presidential transition of Donald Trump
- Opinion polling on the first Trump presidency
- A Better Way, Speaker of the House Paul Ryan's plan
- Timeline of investigations into Trump and Russia (January–June 2017)
