= Jessica Ditto =

American government official

White House Deputy Director of Communications for Implementation
- In office January 20, 2017 – April 10, 2020
- President: Donald Trump

Personal details
- Party: Republican
- Education: Asbury University (Class of 2004)

Jessica Ditto is the former White House Deputy Director of Communications for Donald Trump. She was a member of Trump's 2016 presidential campaign and transition teams.

== Career ==
Ditto worked for Republican governors of Kentucky Ernie Fletcher (in office 2003–2007) and Matt Bevin (2015–2019) and also the Republican Party of Kentucky.

=== 2016 Trump campaign ===
In September 2016, Ditto was reported to be resigning as Gov. Bevin's spokeswoman to become deputy communications director of the Trump campaign.

Also during October 2016, Ditto was a speaker for the campaign relative to the Donald Trump sexual misconduct allegations including Karena Virginia's allegation of unwanted physical contact and Tasha Dixon's allegation of a pageant dressing room visit.

=== Trump presidential transition ===
Following the November 8 general election, Ditto was a member of Donald Trump's presidential transition team. The transition team was a group of around 100 aides, policy experts, government affairs officials, and former government officials who were tasked with vetting, interviewing, and recommending individuals for top cabinet and staff roles in Trump's administration. She was part of the leadership staff.

=== Trump administration ===
Ditto was named to her White House position in early January before the inauguration and assumed it officially at the time of the inauguration.

In early April 2017, Ditto joined her boss Mike Dubke in a gathering of more than thirty staffers including also Kellyanne Conway to consider ways to "brand" the first 100 days of Donald Trump's presidency.

In December 2018, Ditto was found to have violated the Hatch Act by the Office of the Special Counsel for using her official government social media account to engage in political activity. The alleged violation was deemed minor.

In March 2020, Ditto left her position as deputy communications director to enter the private sector.
