= Repeal of Stream Protection Rule =

Repeal of the Stream Protection Rule
- Long title: Disapproving the rule submitted by the Department of the Interior known as the Stream Protection Rule.
- Enacted by: the 115th United States Congress
- Effective: 02/16/2017

Citations
- Public law: Pub. L. 115–5 (text) (PDF)

Legislative history
- Introduced in the House as H.J.R. 38 by Bill Johnson (R-OH) on 01/30/2017; Passed the House on 02/01/2017 (228-194); Passed the Senate on 02/02/2017 (54-45); Signed into law by President Donald Trump on 02/16/2017

The Repeal of the Stream Protection Rule (formally known as Disapproving the rule submitted by the Department of the Interior known as the Stream Protection Rule Pub. L. 115–5 (text) (PDF), H.J.Res. 38) was a House Joint Resolution introduced in the United States House of Representatives by Bill Johnson of Ohio on January 30, 2017. The resolution nullifies the Department of the Interior regulation known as the "Stream Protection Rule", which was established in the Obama Administration. The regulation was scheduled to go into effect on January 19, 2017. The resolution to repeal was signed into law by President Donald Trump on February 16, 2017.

The Congress used its powers under the Congressional Review Act to pass this resolution.
