= Repeal of the Disclosure of Payments by Resource Extraction Issuers Rule =

- Long title: Providing for congressional disapproval under chapter 8 of title 5, United States Code, of a rule submitted by the Securities and Exchange Commission relating to "Disclosure of Payments by Resource Extraction Issuers".
- Enacted by: the 115th United States Congress
- Effective: 02/14/2017

Citations
- Public law: Pub. L. 115–4 (text) (PDF)

Codification
- U.S.C. sections amended: 5 U.S.C. ch. 8

Legislative history
- Introduced in the House as H.J.Res. 41 by Rep. Bill Huizenga (R-MI) on 01/30/2017; Passed the House on 02/01/2017 (235-187); Passed the Senate on 02/03/2017 (52-47); Signed into law by President Donald Trump on 02/14/2017

The Repeal of the Disclosure of Payments by Resource Extraction Issuers Rule (Pub. L. 115–4 (text) (PDF), H.J.Res. 41) is an Act of Congress that nullifies the Securities and Exchange Commission regulation known as the "Disclosure of Payments by Resource Extraction Issuers" rule. This was the first use of the Congressional Review Act during the Trump administration to overrule a federal regulation.

== Regulatory effect ==
The "Disclosure of Payments by Resource Extraction Issuers" regulation mandated that resource extraction issuers disclose payments made to governments for the purposes of developing commercial oil, natural gas, or minerals. The regulation had been mandated by the Dodd–Frank Wall Street Reform and Consumer Protection Act. Advocates of the regulation lobbied that it prevented companies from bribing foreign governments and engaging in other forms of corruption, while detractors argued that the rule placed an excessive burden on American companies and created a competitive disadvantage.

== Legislative history ==
The Joint Resolution was introduced in the United States House of Representatives by Rep. Bill Huizenga on January 30, 2017, and signed into law by President Donald Trump on February 14, 2017.
