= List of protests against Executive Order 13769 =

From January 28 through February 4, 2017, a large number of protests at international airports and other locations were held across the United States and abroad, in opposition to Donald Trump's Executive Order 13769, known as Protecting the Nation from Foreign Terrorist Entry into the United States.

== United States ==
San Francisco International Airport

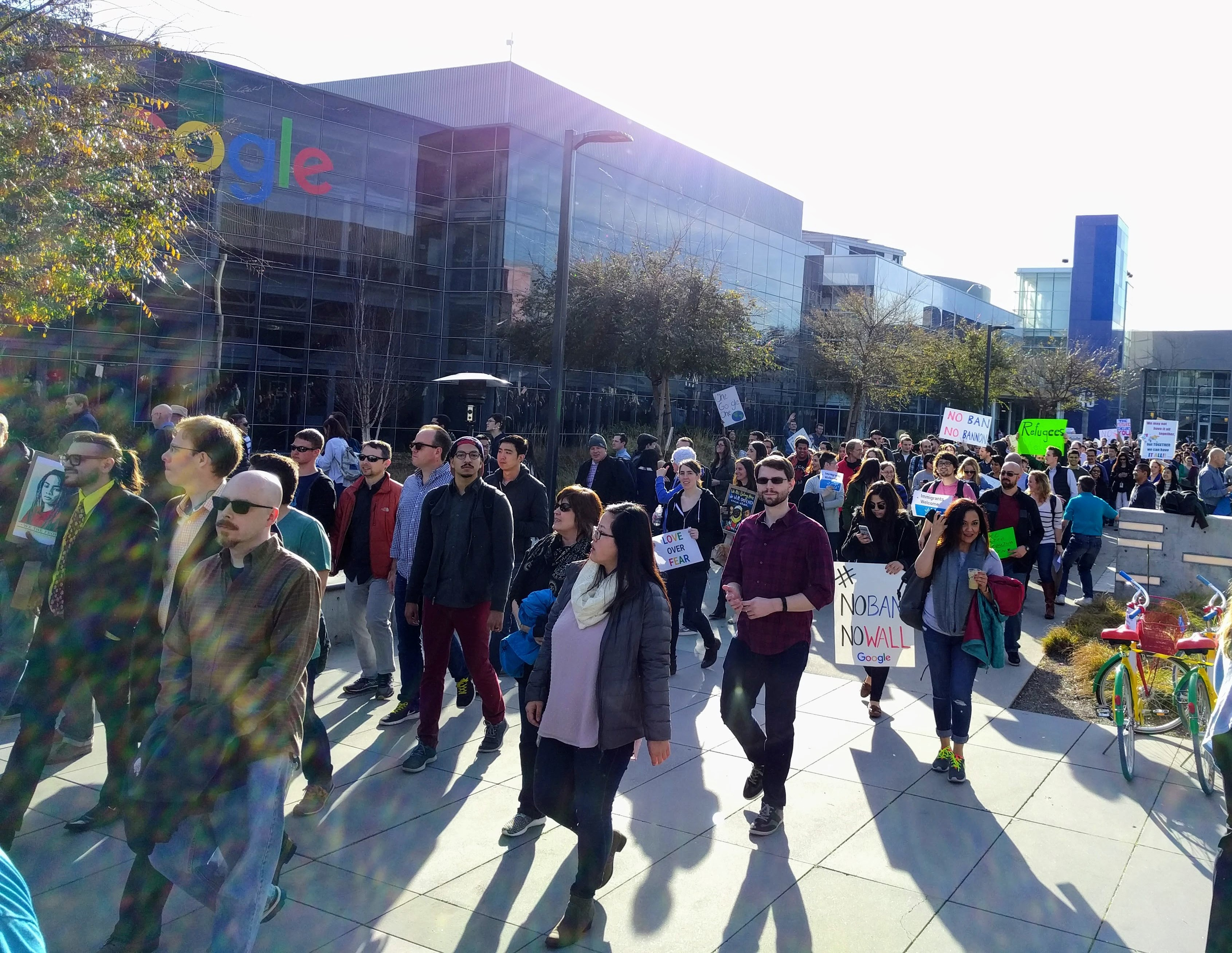
Googleplex, Mountain View

Outside of O'Hare International Airport

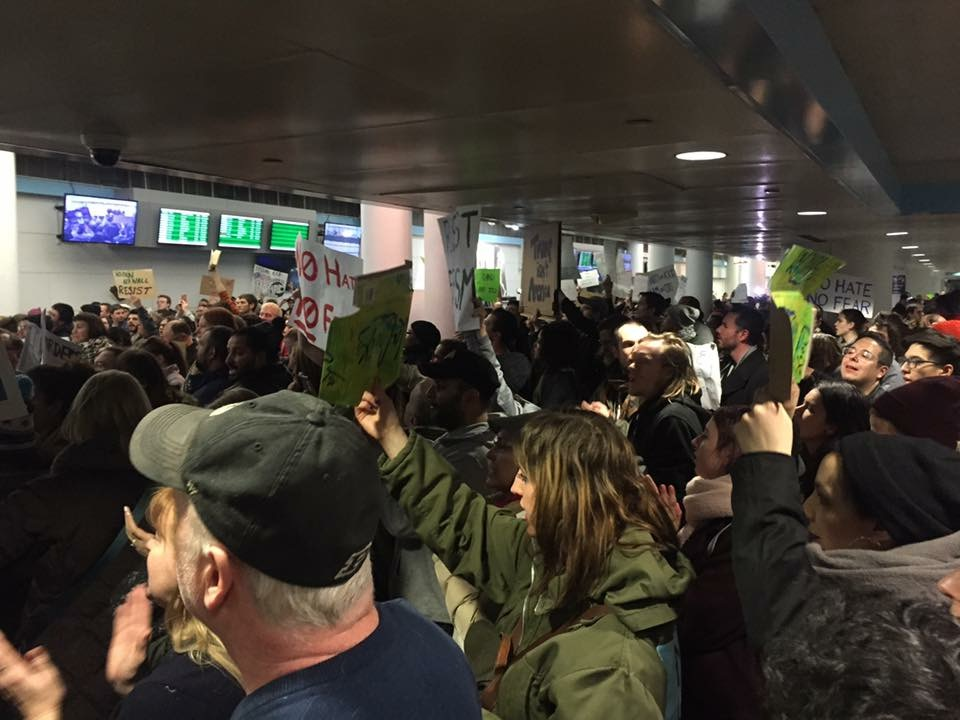
O'Hare International Airport

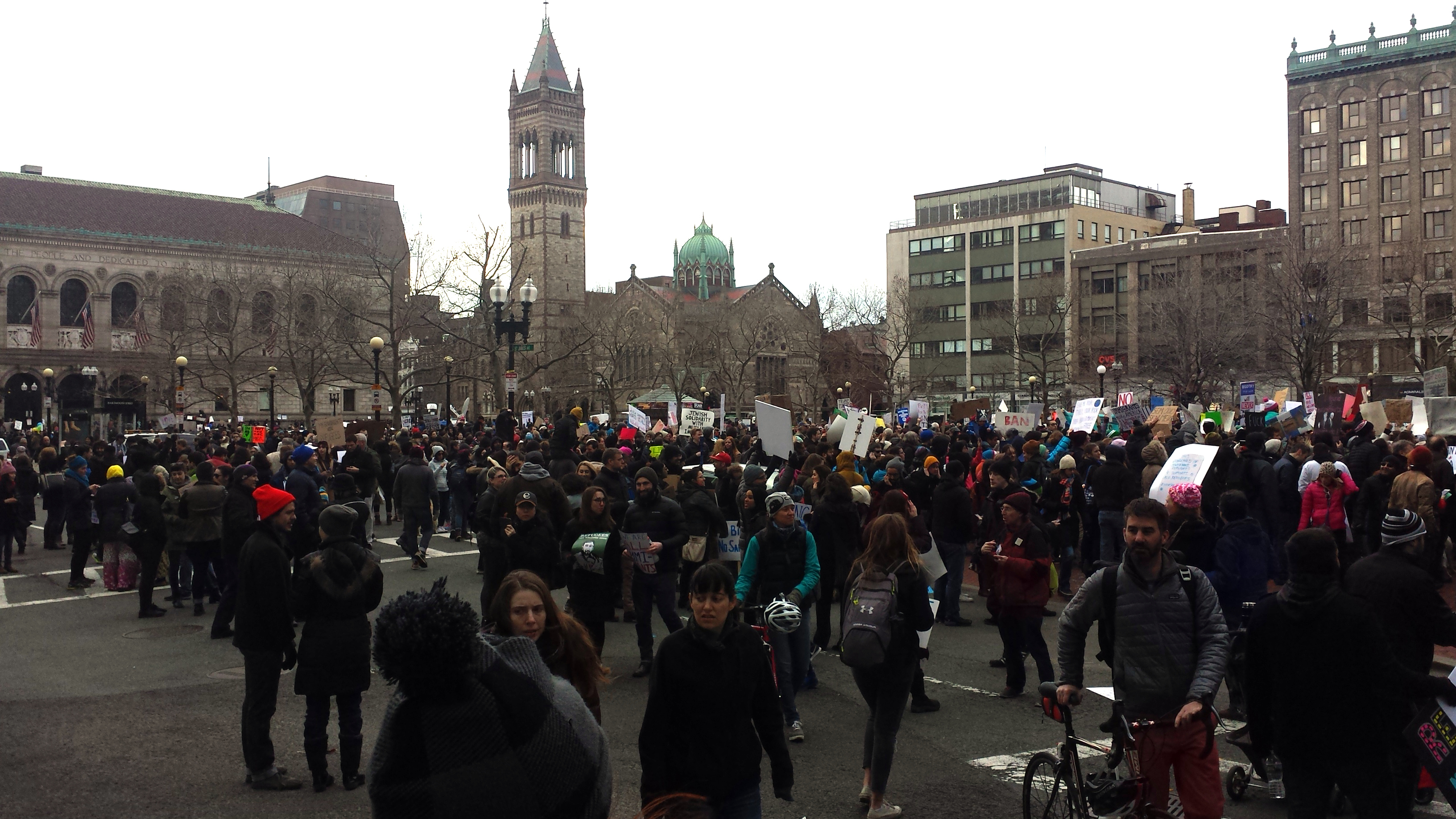
Copley Square, Boston

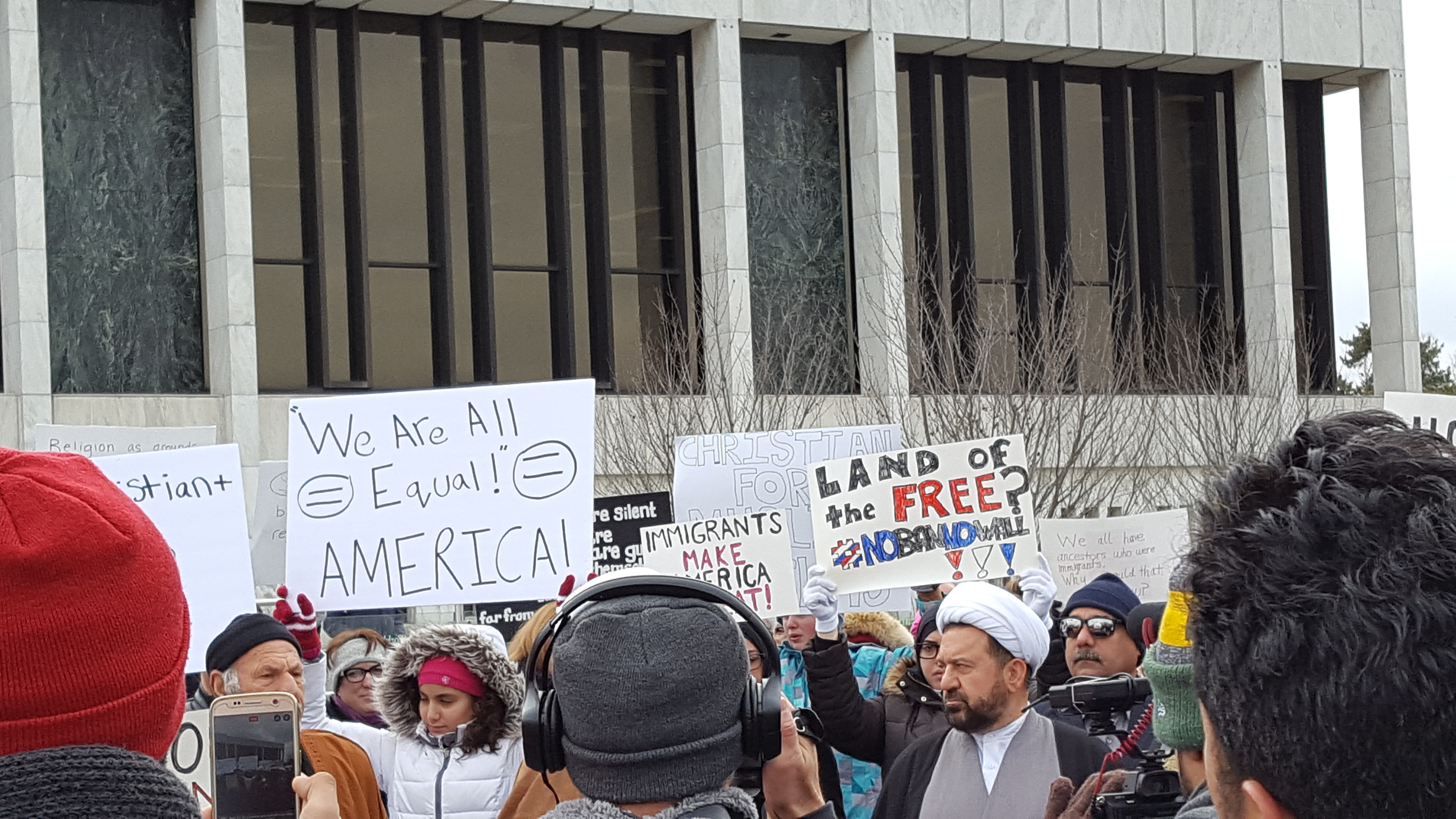
Dearborn, Michigan

Detroit Metropolitan Airport

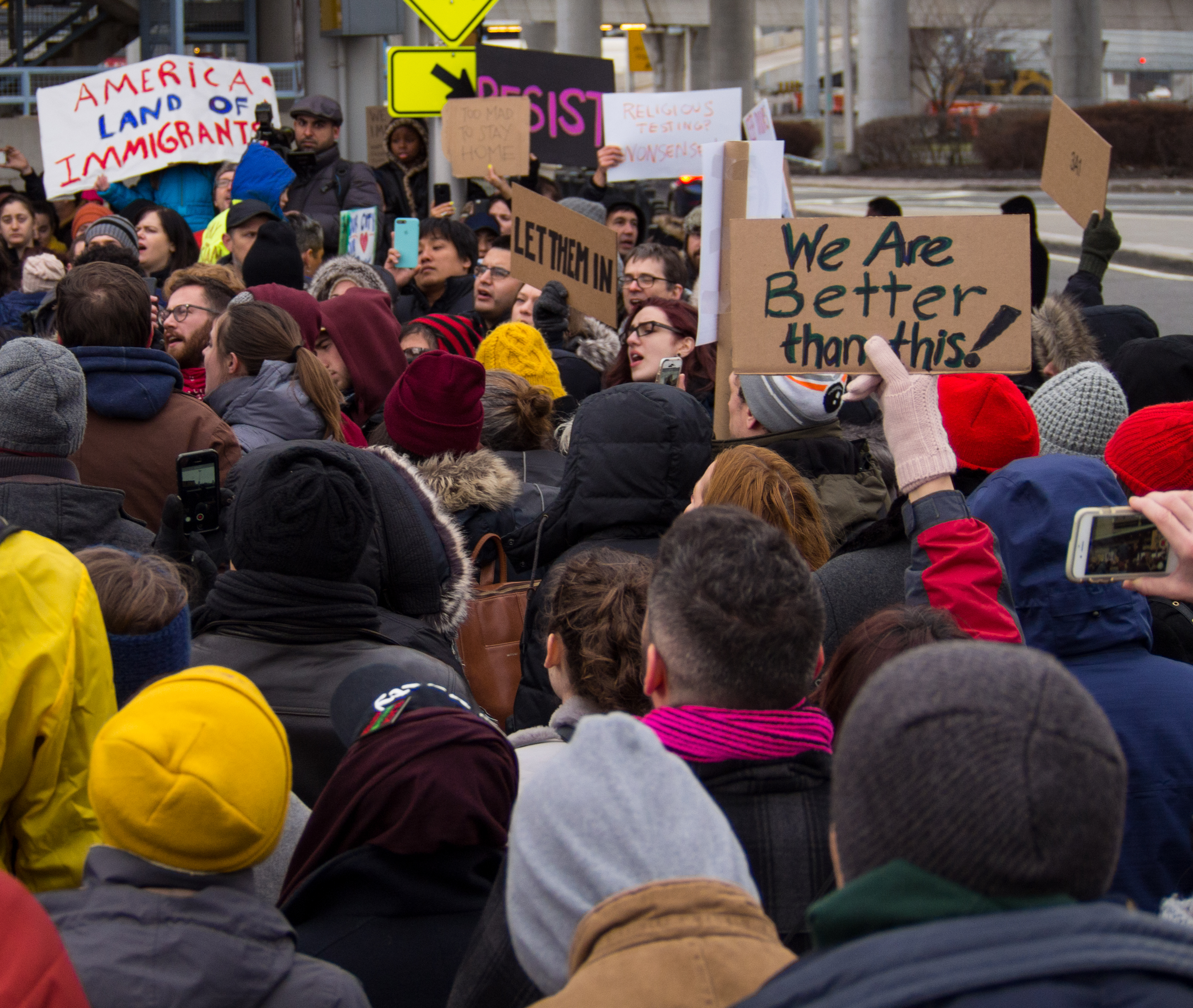
John F. Kennedy International Airport

State	Locations
Alabama	Birmingham-Shuttlesworth International Airport; Huntsville; Montgomery Regional Airport; University of Alabama
Alaska	Anchorage
Arkansas	Arkansas State University; Little Rock, Capitol
Arizona	Flagstaff, Pulliam Airport; Phoenix Sky Harbor International Airport; Tucson, outside Senator John McCain's office
California	Fresno Yosemite International Airport; Googleplex (Google headquarters), Mountain View; Los Angeles International Airport; Ontario International Airport; Sacramento International Airport; San Diego International Airport; San Diego Lindbergh Field; San Francisco Civic Center; San Francisco International Airport; San Jose City Hall; Sunnyvale
Connecticut	Bradley International Airport
Colorado	Boulder: Denver International Airport
Florida	Bradenton; Fort Lauderdale-Hollywood International Airport; Miami International Airport; Orlando International Airport; Palm Beach International Airport; Pensacola International Airport; Sarasota; University of Florida
Georgia	Hartsfield–Jackson Atlanta International Airport
Idaho	Boise Airport
Illinois	Chicago, O'Hare International Airport and the Department of Homeland Security; Champaign-Urbana, Willard Airport
Indiana	Bloomington; Indianapolis International Airport; South Bend
Iowa	Cedar Rapids, Eastern Iowa Airport
Kentucky	Cincinnati/Northern Kentucky International Airport; Louisville International Airport
Louisiana	New Orleans, City Hall; New Orleans, outside Uber office
Maine	Bangor International Airport; Portland International Jetport; Portland City Hall
Massachusetts	Amherst; Boston, Copley Square; Boston, Logan International Airport; Cambridge, Massachusetts Institute of Technology
Maryland	Baltimore–Washington International Airport
Michigan	Central Michigan University; Dearborn; Detroit Metropolitan Airport; Grand Rapids; Hamtramck; Traverse City; Wayne State University
Minnesota	Minneapolis–Saint Paul International Airport
Mississippi	University of Southern Mississippi
Missouri	Kansas City International Airport; Lambert–St. Louis International Airport
Montana	Missoula
Nebraska	Omaha, Turner Park
Nevada	Reno-Tahoe International Airport; Reno, Virginia Street Bridge
New Hampshire	Keene, Central Square
New Jersey	Newark Liberty International Airport; Jersey City; Paterson; Hackensack
New Mexico	Albuquerque; Las Cruces
New York	Albany International Airport; Canton; New York City; Brooklyn Borough Hall; Brooklyn, Federal District Courthouse; Columbia University; Manhattan, Battery Park; Queens, John F. Kennedy International Airport; Staten Island, Port Richmond; Stonewall Inn; Rochester; Sleepy Hollow, Patriots Park
North Carolina	Chapel Hill at Peace and Justice Plaza; Charlotte Douglas International Airport; Raleigh-Durham International Airport
Ohio	Akron, Federal Building; Ashland University; Cincinnati, City Hall; Cleveland Hopkins International Airport; John Glenn Columbus International Airport; Columbus Statehouse; Dayton, Federal Court Building; Mason, Mason Community Center; University of Toledo
Oklahoma	Tulsa
Oregon	Eugene Federal Courthouse; Portland International Airport; Portland at Terry Schrunk Plaza
Pennsylvania	Philadelphia International Airport; Pennsylvania State University; Pittsburgh
Rhode Island	Providence, Rhode Island State House
South Dakota	Rapid City Regional Airport
Tennessee	Knoxville; Nashville, outside Senators' offices
Texas	Austin Bergstrom International Airport; Dallas/Fort Worth International Airport; El Paso International Airport; Houston; George Bush Intercontinental Airport; Discovery Green (near Super Bowl LI festivities); San Antonio, Main Plaza; Texas A&M University Easterwood Airport
Utah	Salt Lake City International Airport
Vermont	Burlington, City Hall Park; Rutland
Virginia	Harrisonburg, Court Square; Richmond, Virginia Commonwealth University; Washington Dulles International Airport
Washington, D.C.	Capitol Hill; Supreme Court; Trump International Hotel.; White House
Washington	Seattle–Tacoma International Airport
Wisconsin	Milwaukee, federal courthouse

== International ==
Country	Locations
Australia	Brisbane; Canberra; Hobart; Melbourne; Newcastle; Sydney
Belgium	Brussels at the Place de la Bourse/Beursplein
Canada	Calgary; Hamilton; Montreal; Ottawa; Toronto; Vancouver; Winnipeg
China	Hong Kong
France	Paris
Germany	Berlin in front of the U.S. Embassy and Brandenburg Gate
Indonesia	Jakarta
Ireland	Cork; Dublin; Shannon Airport
Malaysia	Kuala Lumpur in front of the U.S. Embassy
Mexico	Mexico City
The Netherlands	Amsterdam Airport Schiphol; The Hague
New Zealand	Wellington
Philippines	Manila, outside U.S. Embassy
Spain	Barcelona
United Kingdom	Aberystwyth; Aberdeen; Ashburton; Barnsley; Bangor; Bedford; Belfast; Birmingham; Brighton; Bristol; Broadstairs; Cambridge; Cardiff; Cheltenham; Colchester; Coventry; Derby; Dundee; Edinburgh; Exeter; Glasgow; Hanley; Hastings; Hull; Ipswich; Leamington Spa; Leeds; Leicester; Liverpool; London; Manchester; Middlesbrough; Newcastle; Newport, Isle of Wight; Nottingham; Oxford; Plymouth; Portsmouth; Preston; Scarborough; Reading; Sheffield; Southampton; Southend; Swansea; Swindon; Telford; Totnes; Witney; Worcester; Wolverhampton; York

== See also ==
- Day Without Immigrants 2017
