= A Better Way =

Conservative agenda for U.S. governance

A Better Way was a conservative agenda for U.S. governance, crafted by former Speaker of the House Paul Ryan as well as Kevin Brady, former chairman of the House Ways and Means Committee. Ryan called the six-point plan "a complete alternative to the Left's agenda". Shortly after the 2016 United States elections, Speaker Ryan said that the plan, described by Reuters as an "aggressive Republican legislative agenda", provides a blueprint for laws he expected to spearhead in the Republican congress in cooperation with the Republican Trump administration. For someone other than the party's nominee to direct the party's agenda in a presidential election year was termed "a rare move".

== Six-point plan ==
The plan covers six points: poverty, national security, economy, Constitution, health care, and tax reform. The points in the plan, which Speaker Ryan intended to press forward in the 2017–2018 115th Congress, had been described as "mostly ignor[ing] the areas where Trump's agenda clash with tenets of conservative doctrine" such as trade policy, immigration reform and entitlement cuts. It did not cover some points that were major issues in the presidential campaign, such as a border wall with Mexico and banning immigrants who are Muslims.

1. Poverty
  Proponents of the plan believe that welfare reform can address systemic problems of poverty in America. Critics say the plan will "cut the social safety net".
2. National Security
  The national security plan contains four sub-points: "defeat the terrorists," "protect the homeland," "tackle new threats" and "defend freedom". It further addresses border security with a plan to "accelerate the deployment of fencing, technology, air assets, and personnel at the border". The plan was said to "push back" on Trump's "America First" agenda enunciated during the presidential campaign.
3. U.S. economy
4. Constitutional rule
  The constitution plan contains four sub-points: stopping executive overreach, reining in regulators, imposing new limits on spending, and increasing transparency.
5. Healthcare
  House Republicans plan to repeal and replace the Affordable Care Act ("Obamacare")
6. Tax reform
  A number of proposed changes to the United States tax code have been announced by the United States House Committee on Ways and Means. The proposal would reduce the federal corporate tax rate from 35 percent to 20 percent as well as repealing the corporate alternative minimum tax ("AMT"). Depreciation rules would be replaced with expensing new investment in equipment, structures, and intellectual property. Depreciation or expensing deduction would not be allowed for land, and inventories would be subject to last-in-first-out (LIFO) accounting. In addition, the deductibility of net interest expense would be eliminated. Additionally, corporate tax would be "border adjusted", which would mean that exports would be exempt from the tax and imports subject to it.

== Border adjustment ==
One of the largest revenue increasing proposals of the plan is reform of corporate tax which is "border adjusted." This would mean that exports would be exempt from tax and imports would be subject to it. The Economist and others note that this may fall foul of World Trade Organization (WTO) rules. Bloomberg View noted that the proposed tax would favour domestically produced goods as they would be taxed less than imports, to a degree varying across sectors. For example, the wage component of the cost of domestically produced goods would not be taxed. Because the United States imports more than it exports, border adjustability would raise $1.2trn over a decade, covering almost two-thirds of the cost of cutting the tax rate to 20%, according to the Tax Policy Centre.

On January 16, Donald Trump commented that a border adjustment tax would be "too complicated" in a Wall Street Journal article. White House Press Secretary Sean Spicer stated on January 26 said that the proposal was "one idea" of the administration in regards to tax policy.

== Proposed ==
1. American Health Care Act (H.R. 1628), passed House May 4, 2017
2. Financial CHOICE Act (H.R. 10), passed House June 8, 2017

== Results ==
1. Consolidated Appropriations Act, 2017, H.R. 244, Pub. L. 115–31 (text) (PDF)
2. Countering America's Adversaries Through Sanctions Act, H.R. 3364, Pub. L. 115–44 (text) (PDF)
3. National Defense Authorization Act for Fiscal Year 2018, H.R. 2810, Pub. L. 115–91 (text) (PDF)
4. Tax Cuts and Jobs Act of 2017, H.R. 1, Pub. L. 115–97 (text) (PDF)
5. Bipartisan Budget Act of 2018, H.R. 1892, Pub. L. 115–123 (text) (PDF)
6. Consolidated Appropriations Act, 2018 (including the CLOUD Act), H.R. 1625, Pub. L. 115–141 (text) (PDF)
7. Stop Enabling Sex Traffickers Act, H.R. 1865, Pub. L. 115–164 (text) (PDF)
8. Economic Growth, Regulatory Relief and Consumer Protection Act, S. 2155, Pub. L. 115–174 (text) (PDF)
9. Trickett Wendler, Frank Mongiello, Jordan McLinn, and Matthew Bellina Right to Try Act of 2017, S. 204, Pub. L. 115–176 (text) (PDF)
10. National Defense Authorization Act for Fiscal Year 2019, H.R. 5515, Pub. L. 115–232 (text) (PDF)
11. FAA Reauthorization Act of 2018, H.R. 302, Pub. L. 115–254 (text) (PDF)
12. Music Modernization Act, H.R. 1551, Pub. L. 115–264 (text) (PDF)
13. America's Water Infrastructure Act of 2018, S. 3021, Pub. L. 115–270 (text) (PDF)
14. SUPPORT for Patients and Communities Act, H.R. 6, Pub. L. 115–271 (text) (PDF)
15. Agriculture Improvement Act of 2018, H.R. 2, Pub. L. 115–334 (text) (PDF)
16. FIRST STEP Act, S. 756, Pub. L. 115–391 (text) (PDF)
