= List of acts of the 115th United States Congress =

The list of acts of the 115th United States Congress includes all Acts of Congress and ratified treaties by the 115th United States Congress, which began on January 3, 2017, and ended on January 3, 2019.

Acts include public and private laws, which are enacted after being passed by Congress and signed by the President; however, if the President vetoes a bill it can still be enacted by a two-thirds vote in both houses. The Senate alone considers treaties, which are ratified by a two-thirds vote.

The first public law enacted in the 115th Congress (Pub. L. 115–1 (text) (PDF)) was the last law signed by President Barack Obama, and he signed it into law in the Capitol in the last hour of his presidency on January 20, 2017, shortly before the inauguration of his successor. All subsequent acts of this Congress signed into law (beginning with Pub. L. 115–2 (text) (PDF) which was signed later the same day) were signed by President Donald Trump. The 115th Congress enacted 442 statutes and ratified 6 treaties.

== Public laws ==
Public law number (Linked to Wikisource)	Date of enactment	Official short title(s)	Official title	Link to GPO
115-1	January 20, 2017	Tested Ability to Leverage Exceptional National Talent Act of 2017 or the TALENT Act of 2017	To amend title 5, United States Code, to codify the Presidential Innovation Fellows Program, and for other purposes.	Pub. L. 115–1 (text) (PDF)
115-2	January 20, 2017	(No short title)	To provide for an exception to a limitation against appointment of persons as Secretary of Defense within seven years of relief from active duty as a regular commissioned officer of the Armed Forces.	Pub. L. 115–2 (text) (PDF)
115-3	January 31, 2017	GAO Access and Oversight Act of 2017	To ensure the Government Accountability Office has adequate access to information.	Pub. L. 115–3 (text) (PDF)
115-4	February 14, 2017	(No short title) unofficially known as the Repeal of the Disclosure of Payments by Resource Extraction Issuers Rule	Providing for congressional disapproval under chapter 8 of title 5, United States Code, of a rule submitted by the Securities and Exchange Commission relating to Disclosure of Payments by Resource Extraction Issuers.	Pub. L. 115–4 (text) (PDF)
115-5	February 16, 2017	(No short title) unofficially known as the Repeal of Stream Protection Rule	Disapproving the rule submitted by the Department of the Interior known as the Stream Protection Rule.	Pub. L. 115–5 (text) (PDF)
115-6	February 28, 2017	Promoting Women in Entrepreneurship Act	To authorize the National Science Foundation to support entrepreneurial programs for women.	Pub. L. 115–6 (text) (PDF)
115-7	February 28, 2017	INSPIRE Women Act	To inspire women to enter the aerospace field, including science, technology, engineering, and mathematics, through mentorship and outreach.	Pub. L. 115–7 (text) (PDF)
115-8	February 28, 2017	(No short title) unofficially known as the Repeal of the Implementation of the NICS Improvement Amendments Act of 2007	Providing for congressional disapproval under chapter 8 of title 5, United States Code, of the rule submitted by the Social Security Administration relating to Implementation of the NICS Improvement Amendments Act of 2007.	Pub. L. 115–8 (text) (PDF)
115-9	March 13, 2017	(No short title)	To designate the United States Department of Veterans Affairs health care center in Center Township, Butler County, Pennsylvania, as the "Abie Abraham VA Clinic."	Pub. L. 115–9 (text) (PDF)
115-10	March 21, 2017	National Aeronautics and Space Administration Transition Authorization Act of 2017, with: To Research, Evaluate, Assess, and Treat Astronauts Act or the TREAT Astronauts Act	To authorize the programs of the National Aeronautics and Space Administration, and for other purposes.	Pub. L. 115–10 (text) (PDF)
115-11	March 27, 2017	(No short title)	Disapproving the rule submitted by the Department of Defense, the General Services Administration, and the National Aeronautics and Space Administration relating to the Federal Acquisition Regulation.	Pub. L. 115–11 (text) (PDF)
115-12	March 27, 2017	(No short title)	Disapproving the rule submitted by the Department of the Interior relating to Bureau of Land Management regulations that establish the procedures used to prepare, revise, or amend land use plans pursuant to the Federal Land Policy and Management Act of 1976.	Pub. L. 115–12 (text) (PDF)
115-13	March 27, 2017	(No short title)	Providing for congressional disapproval under chapter 8 of title 5, United States Code, of the rule submitted by the Department of Education relating to accountability and State plans under the Elementary and Secondary Education Act of 1965.	Pub. L. 115–13 (text) (PDF)
115-14	March 27, 2017	(No short title)	Providing for congressional disapproval under chapter 8 of title 5, United States Code, of the rule submitted by the Department of Education relating to teacher preparation issues.	Pub. L. 115–14 (text) (PDF)
115-15	March 28, 2017	Vietnam War Veterans Recognition Act of 2017	To amend title 4, United States Code, to encourage the display of the flag of the United States on National Vietnam War Veterans Day.	Pub. L. 115–15 (text) (PDF)
115-16	March 31, 2017	(No short title)	To name the United States Department of Veterans Affairs community-based outpatient clinic in Pago Pago, American Samoa, the Faleomavaega Eni Fa'aua'a Hunkin VA Clinic.	Pub. L. 115–16 (text) (PDF)
115-17	March 31, 2017	(No short title)	Disapproving the rule submitted by the Department of Labor relating to drug testing of unemployment compensation applicants.	Pub. L. 115–17 (text) (PDF)
115-18	March 31, 2017	(No short title)	Approving the location of a memorial to commemorate and honor the members of the Armed Forces who served on active duty in support of Operation Desert Storm or Operation Desert Shield.	Pub. L. 115–18 (text) (PDF)
115-19	April 3, 2017	(No short title)	To provide for the appointment of members of the Board of Directors of the Office of Compliance to replace members whose terms expire during 2017, and for other purposes.	Pub. L. 115–19 (text) (PDF)
115-20	April 3, 2017	(No short title)	Providing for congressional disapproval under chapter 8 of title 5, United States Code, of the final rule of the Department of the Interior relating to "Non-Subsistence Take of Wildlife, and Public Participation and Closure Procedures, on National Wildlife Refuges in Alaska".	Pub. L. 115–20 (text) (PDF)
115-21	April 3, 2017	(No short title)	Disapproving the rule submitted by the Department of Labor relating to "Clarification of Employer's Continuing Obligation to Make and Maintain an Accurate Record of Each Recordable Injury and Illness".	Pub. L. 115–21 (text) (PDF)
115-22	April 3, 2017	(No short title)	A joint resolution providing for congressional disapproval under chapter 8 of title 5, United States Code, of the rule submitted by the Federal Communications Commission relating to "Protecting the Privacy of Customers of Broadband and Other Telecommunications Services".	Pub. L. 115–22 (text) (PDF)
115-23	April 13, 2017	(No short title)	Providing for congressional disapproval under chapter 8 of title 5, United States Code, of the final rule submitted by Secretary of Health and Human Services relating to compliance with title X requirements by project requirements by project recipients in selecting subrecipients.	Pub. L. 115–23 (text) (PDF)
115-24	April 13, 2017	(No short title)	Disapproving the rule submitted by the Department of Labor relating to savings arrangements established by qualified State political subdivisions for non-governmental employees.	Pub. L. 115–24 (text) (PDF)
115-25	April 18, 2017	Weather Research and Forecasting Innovation Act of 2017	To improve the National Oceanic and Atmospheric Administration's weather research through a focused program of investment on affordable and attainable advances in observational, computing, and modeling capabilities to support substantial improvement in weather forecasting and prediction of high impact weather events, to expand commercial opportunities for the provision of weather data, and for other purposes.	Pub. L. 115–25 (text) (PDF)
115-26	April 19, 2017	(No short title)	To amend the Veterans Access, Choice, and Accountability Act of 2014 to modify the termination date for the Veterans Choice Program, and for other purposes.	Pub. L. 115–26 (text) (PDF)
115-27	April 19, 2017	(No short title)	A joint resolution providing for the reappointment of Steve Case as a citizen regent of the Board of Regents of the Smithsonian Institution.	Pub. L. 115–27 (text) (PDF)
115-28	April 19, 2017	(No short title)	A joint resolution providing for the appointment of Michael Govan as a citizen regent of the Board of Regents of the Smithsonian Institution.	Pub. L. 115–28 (text) (PDF)
115-29	April 19, 2017	(No short title)	A joint resolution providing for the appointment of Roger W. Ferguson as a citizen regent of the Board of Regents of the Smithsonian Institution.	Pub. L. 115–29 (text) (PDF)
115-30	April 28, 2017	(No short title)	Making further continuing appropriations for fiscal year 2017, and for other purposes.	Pub. L. 115–30 (text) (PDF)
115-31	May 5, 2017	Consolidated Appropriations Act, 2017	Making appropriations for the fiscal year ending September 30, 2017, and for other purposes.	Pub. L. 115–31 (text) (PDF)
115-32	May 8, 2017	U.S. Wants to Compete for a World Expo Act	To require the Secretary of State to take such actions as may be necessary for the United States to rejoin the Bureau of International Expositions, and for other purposes.	Pub. L. 115–32 (text) (PDF)
115-33	May 12, 2017	(No short title)	To repeal the rule issued by the Federal Highway Administration and the Federal Transit Administration entitled "Metropolitan Planning Organization Coordination and Planning Area Reform".	Pub. L. 115–33 (text) (PDF)
115-34	May 16, 2017	Modernizing Government Travel Act	To provide for reimbursement for the use of modern travel services by Federal employees traveling on official Government business, and for other purposes.	Pub. L. 115–34 (text) (PDF)
115-35	May 17, 2017	(No short title)	Disapproving the rule submitted by the Department of Labor relating to savings arrangements established by States for non-governmental employees.	Pub. L. 115–35 (text) (PDF)
115-36	June 2, 2017	Public Safety Officers' Benefits Improvement Act of 2017	To require adequate reporting on the Public Safety Officers' Benefits program, and for other purposes.	Pub. L. 115–36 (text) (PDF)
115-37	June 2, 2017	American Law Enforcement Heroes Act of 2017	To amend the Omnibus Crime Control and Safe Streets Act of 1968 to authorize COPS grantees to use grant funds to hire veterans as career law enforcement officers, and for other purposes.	Pub. L. 115–37 (text) (PDF)
115-38	June 6, 2017	DHS Stop Asset and Vehicle Excess Act	To amend the Homeland Security Act of 2002 to direct the Under Secretary for Management of the Department of Homeland Security to make certain improvements in managing the Department's vehicle fleet, and for other purposes.	Pub. L. 115–38 (text) (PDF)
115-39	June 6, 2017	(No short title)	To designate the Federal building and United States courthouse located at 719 Church Street in Nashville, Tennessee, as the "Fred D. Thompson Federal Building and United States Courthouse".	Pub. L. 115–39 (text) (PDF)
115-40	June 14, 2017	Follow the Rules Act	To amend title 5, United States Code, to extend certain protections against prohibited personnel practices, and for other purposes.	Pub. L. 115–40 (text) (PDF)
115-41	June 23, 2017	Department of Veterans Affairs Accountability and Whistleblower Protection Act of 2017	To amend title 38, United States Code, to improve the accountability of employees of the United States Department of Veterans Affairs, and for other purposes.	Pub. L. 115–41 (text) (PDF)
115-42	June 27, 2017	(No short title)	To amend section 1214 of title 5, United States Code, to provide for stays during a period that the Merit Systems Protection Board lacks a quorum.	Pub. L. 115–42 (text) (PDF)
115-43	June 30, 2017	Securing our Agriculture and Food Act	To amend the Homeland Security Act of 2002 to make the Assistant Secretary of Homeland Security for Health Affairs responsible for coordinating the efforts of the Department of Homeland Security related to food, agriculture, and veterinary defense against terrorism, and for other purposes.	Pub. L. 115–43 (text) (PDF)
115-44	August 2, 2017	Countering America's Adversaries Through Sanctions Act	To provide congressional review and to counter aggression by the Governments of Iran, the Russian Federation, and North Korea, and for other purposes.	Pub. L. 115–44 (text) (PDF)
115-45	August 4, 2017	Wounded Officers Recovery Act of 2017	To authorize the Capitol Police Board to make payments from the United States Capitol Police Memorial Fund to employees of the United States Capitol Police who have sustained serious line-of-duty injuries, and for other purposes.	Pub. L. 115–45 (text) (PDF)
115-46	August 12, 2017	(No short title)	To authorize appropriations and to appropriate amounts for the Veterans Choice Program of the United States Department of Veterans Affairs, to improve hiring authorities of the Department, to authorize major medical facility leases, and for other purposes.	Pub. L. 115–46 (text) (PDF)
115-47	August 16, 2017	(No short title)	To designate the community living center of the United States Department of Veterans Affairs in Butler Township, Butler County, Pennsylvania, as the "Sergeant Joseph George Kusick VA Community Living Center".	Pub. L. 115–47 (text) (PDF)
115-48	August 16, 2017	Harry W. Colmery Veterans Educational Assistance Act of 2017	To amend title 38, United States Code, to make certain improvements in the laws administered by the Secretary of Veterans Affairs, and for other purposes.	Pub. L. 115–48 (text) (PDF)
115-49	August 18, 2017	(No short title)	To remove the sunset provision of section 203 of Public Law 105-384, and for other purposes.	Pub. L. 115–49 (text) (PDF)
115-50	August 18, 2017	Rapid DNA Act of 2017	To establish a system for integration of Rapid DNA instruments for use by law enforcement to reduce violent crime and reduce the current DNA analysis backlog.	Pub. L. 115–50 (text) (PDF)
115-51	August 18, 2017	Global War on Terrorism War Memorial Act	To authorize the Global War on Terror Memorial Foundation to establish the National Global War on Terrorism Memorial as a commemorative work in the District of Columbia, and for other purposes.	Pub. L. 115–51 (text) (PDF)
115-52	August 18, 2017	FDA Reauthorization Act of 2017	To amend the Federal Food, Drug, and Cosmetic Act to revise and extend the user-fee programs for prescription drugs, medical devices, generic drugs, and biosimilar biological products, and for other purposes.	Pub. L. 115–52 (text) (PDF)
115-53	August 22, 2017	Northern Mariana Islands Economic Expansion Act	To amend Public Law 94-241 with respect to the Northern Mariana Islands.	Pub. L. 115–53 (text) (PDF)
115-54	August 22, 2017	(No short title)	Granting the consent and approval of Congress for the Commonwealth of Virginia, the State of Maryland, and the District of Columbia to enter into a compact relating to the establishment of the Washington Metrorail Safety Commission.	Pub. L. 115–54 (text) (PDF)
115-55	August 23, 2017	Veterans Appeals Improvement and Modernization Act of 2017	To amend title 38, United States Code, to reform the rights and processes relating to appeals of decisions regarding claims for benefits under the laws administered by the Secretary of Veterans Affairs, and for other purposes.	Pub. L. 115–55 (text) (PDF)
115-56	September 8, 2017	Continuing Appropriations Act, 2018 and Supplemental Appropriations for Disaster Relief Requirements Act, 2017	To enhance the transparency and accelerate the impact of assistance provided under the Foreign Assistance Act of 1961 to promote quality basic education in developing countries, to better enable such countries to achieve universal access to quality basic education and improved learning outcomes, to eliminate duplication and waste, and for other purposes.	Pub. L. 115–56 (text) (PDF)
115-57	September 12, 2017	Emergency Aid to American Survivors of Hurricanes Irma and Jose Overseas Act	To amend section 1113 of the Social Security Act to provide authority for increased fiscal year 2017 and 2018 payments for temporary assistance to United States citizens returned from foreign countries.	Pub. L. 115–57 (text) (PDF)
115-58	September 14, 2017	(No short title)	A joint resolution condemning the violence and domestic terrorist attack that took place during events between August 11 and 12, 2017, in Charlottesville, Virginia, recognizing the first responders who lost their lives while monitoring the events, offering deepest condolences to the families and friends of those individuals who were killed and deepest sympathies and support to those individuals who were injured by the violence, expressing support for the Charlottesville community, rejecting White nationalists, White supremacists, the Ku Klux Klan, neo-Nazis, and other hate groups, and urging the President and the President's Cabinet to use all available resources to address the threats posed by those groups.	Pub. L. 115–58 (text) (PDF)
115-59	September 15, 2017	Social Security Number Fraud Prevention Act of 2017	To restrict the inclusion of social security account numbers on Federal documents sent by mail, and for other purposes.	Pub. L. 115–59 (text) (PDF)
115-60	September 15, 2017	Bob Dole Congressional Gold Medal Act	To award the Congressional Gold Medal to Bob Dole, in recognition for his service to the nation as a soldier, legislator, and statesman.	Pub. L. 115–60 (text) (PDF)
115-61	September 27, 2017	Financial Stability Oversight Council Insurance Member Continuity Act	To amend the Financial Stability Act of 2010 to modify the term of the independent member of the Financial Stability Oversight Council.	Pub. L. 115–61 (text) (PDF)
115-62	September 29, 2017	Department of Veterans Affairs Expiring Authorities Act of 2017	To amend title 38, United States Code, to extend certain expiring provisions of law administered by the Secretary of Veterans Affairs, and for other purposes.	Pub. L. 115–62 (text) (PDF)
115-63	September 29, 2017	Disaster Tax Relief and Airport and Airway Extension Act of 2017	To amend title 49, United States Code, to extend authorizations for the airport improvement program, to amend the Internal Revenue Code of 1986 to extend the funding and expenditure authority of the Airport and Airway Trust Fund, to provide disaster tax relief, and for other purposes.	Pub. L. 115–63 (text) (PDF)
115-64	September 29, 2017	Hurricanes Harvey, Irma, and Maria Education Relief Act of 2017	To provide the Secretary of Education with waiver authority for the reallocation rules and authority to extend the deadline by which funds have to be reallocated in the campus-based aid programs under the Higher Education Act of 1965 due to Hurricane Harvey, Hurricane Irma, and Hurricane Maria, to provide equitable services to children and teachers in private schools, and for other purposes.	Pub. L. 115–64 (text) (PDF)
115-65	October 6, 2017	The American Legion 100th Anniversary Commemorative Coin Act	To require the Secretary of the Treasury to mint commemorative coins in recognition of the 100th anniversary of The American Legion.	Pub. L. 115–65 (text) (PDF)
115-66	October 6, 2017	Fair Access to Investment Research Act of 2017	To direct the Securities and Exchange Commission to provide a safe harbor related to certain investment fund research reports, and for other purposes.	Pub. L. 115–66 (text) (PDF)
115-67	October 6, 2017	(No short title)	To facilitate construction of a bridge on certain property in Christian County, Missouri, and for other purposes.	Pub. L. 115–67 (text) (PDF)
115-68	October 6, 2017	Women, Peace, and Security Act of 2017	To ensure that the United States promotes the meaningful participation of women in mediation and negotiation processes seeking to prevent, mitigate, or resolve violent conflict.	Pub. L. 115–68 (text) (PDF)
115-69	October 18, 2017	(No short title)	To require the Administrator of the Federal Emergency Management Agency to submit a report regarding certain plans regarding assistance to applicants and grantees during the response to an emergency or disaster.	Pub. L. 115–69 (text) (PDF)
115-70	October 18, 2017	Elder Abuse Prevention and Prosecution Act	To prevent elder abuse and exploitation and improve the justice system's response to victims in elder abuse and exploitation cases.	Pub. L. 115–70 (text) (PDF)
115-71	October 18, 2017	Early Hearing Detection and Intervention Act of 2017	To amend the Public Health Service Act to reauthorize a program for early detection, diagnosis, and treatment regarding deaf and hard-of-hearing newborns, infants, and young children.	Pub. L. 115–71 (text) (PDF)
115-72	October 26, 2017	Additional Supplemental Appropriations for Disaster Relief Requirements Act, 2017	To amend title 28 of the United States Code to authorize the appointment of additional bankruptcy judges; and for other purposes.	Pub. L. 115–72 (text) (PDF)
115-73	October 26, 2017	Dr. Chris Kirkpatrick Whistleblower Protection Act of 2017	To provide greater whistleblower protections for Federal employees, increased awareness of Federal whistleblower protections, and increased accountability and required discipline for Federal supervisors who retaliate against whistleblowers, and for other purposes.	Pub. L. 115–73 (text) (PDF)
115-74	November 1, 2017	(No short title)	Providing for congressional disapproval under chapter 8 of title 5, United States Code, of the rule submitted by Bureau of Consumer Financial Protection relating to "Arbitration Agreements".	Pub. L. 115–74 (text) (PDF)
115-75	November 2, 2017	Veterans' Compensation Cost-of-Living Adjustment Act of 2017	To increase, effective as of December 1, 2017, the rates of compensation for veterans with service-connected disabilities and the rates of dependency and indemnity compensation for the survivors of certain disabled veterans, to amend title 38, United States Code, to improve the United States Court of Appeals for Veterans Claims, to improve the processing of claims by the Secretary of Veterans Affairs, and for other purposes.	Pub. L. 115–75 (text) (PDF)
115-76	November 2, 2017	Strengthening State and Local Cyber Crime Fighting Act of 2017	To amend the Homeland Security Act of 2002 to authorize the National Computer Forensics Institute, and for other purposes.	Pub. L. 115–76 (text) (PDF)
115-77	November 2, 2017	Frederick Douglass Bicentennial Commission Act	To establish the Frederick Douglass Bicentennial Commission.	Pub. L. 115–77 (text) (PDF)
115-78	November 2, 2017	Power and Security Systems (PASS) Act	To provide for consideration of the extension under the Energy Policy and Conservation Act of nonapplication of No-Load Mode energy efficiency standards to certain security or life safety alarms or surveillance systems, and for other purposes.	Pub. L. 115–78 (text) (PDF)
115-79	November 2, 2017	Asia-Pacific Economic Cooperation Business Travel Cards Act of 2017	To permanently authorize the Asia-Pacific Economic Cooperation Business Travel Card Program.	Pub. L. 115–79 (text) (PDF)
115-80	November 2, 2017	National Clinical Care Commission Act	To establish a National Clinical Care Commission.	Pub. L. 115–80 (text) (PDF)
115-81	November 2, 2017	Javier Vega, Jr. Memorial Act of 2017	To designate the checkpoint of the United States Border Patrol located on United States Highway 77 North in Sarita, Texas, as the "Javier Vega, Jr. Border Patrol Checkpoint".	Pub. L. 115–81 (text) (PDF)
115-82	November 2, 2017	PROTECT Our Children Act of 2017	To reauthorize the National Internet Crimes Against Children Task Force Program, and for other purposes.	Pub. L. 115–82 (text) (PDF)
115-83	November 17, 2017	Protecting Patient Access to Emergency Medications Act of 2017	To amend the Controlled Substances Act with regard to the provision of emergency medical services.	Pub. L. 115–83 (text) (PDF)
115-84	November 17, 2017	TSP Modernization Act of 2017	To amend title 5, United States Code, to provide for flexibility in making withdrawals from a Thrift Savings Plan account, and for other purposes.	Pub. L. 115–84 (text) (PDF)
115-85	November 21, 2017	Federal Agency Mail Management Act of 2017	To ensure the effective processing of mail by Federal agencies, and for other purposes.	Pub. L. 115–85 (text) (PDF)
115-86	November 21, 2017	VA Prescription Data Accountability Act 2017	To amend title 38, United States Code, to clarify the authority of the Secretary of Veterans Affairs to disclose certain patient information to State controlled substance monitoring programs, and for other purposes.	Pub. L. 115–86 (text) (PDF)
115-87	November 21, 2017	FEMA Accountability, Modernization and Transparency Act of 2017	To ensure that the Federal Emergency Management Agency's current efforts to modernize its grant management system includes applicant accessibility and transparency, and for other purposes.	Pub. L. 115–87 (text) (PDF)
115-88	November 21, 2017	FITARA Enhancement Act of 2017	To amend title 40, United States Code, to eliminate the sunset of certain provisions relating to information technology, to amend the National Defense Authorization Act for Fiscal Year 2015 to extend the sunset relating to the Federal Data Center Consolidation Initiative, and for other purposes.	Pub. L. 115–88 (text) (PDF)
115-89	November 21, 2017	VALOR Act	To amend title 38, United States Code, to provide for the designation of State approving agencies for multi-State apprenticeship programs for purposes of the educational assistance programs of the Department of Veterans Affairs.	Pub. L. 115–89 (text) (PDF)
115-90	December 8, 2017	(No short title)	Making further continuing appropriations for fiscal year 2018, and for other purposes.	Pub. L. 115–90 (text) (PDF)
115-91	December 12, 2017	National Defense Authorization Act for Fiscal Year 2018, including: Intermediate-Range Nuclear Forces (INF) Treaty Preservation Act of 2017; Military Construction Authorization Act for Fiscal Year 2018; Foreign Spill Protection Act of 2017; Saving Federal Dollars Through Better Use of Government Purchase and Travel Cards Act of 2017	To authorize appropriations for fiscal year 2018 for military activities of the Department of Defense, for military construction, and for defense activities of the Department of Energy, to prescribe military personnel strengths for such fiscal year, and for other purposes.	Pub. L. 115–91 (text) (PDF)
115-92	December 12, 2017	(No short title)	To amend the Federal Food, Drug, and Cosmetic Act to authorize additional emergency uses for medical products to reduce deaths and severity of injuries caused by agents of war, and for other purposes.	Pub. L. 115–92 (text) (PDF)
115-93	December 18, 2017	Indian Employment, Training and Related Services Consolidation Act of 2017	To amend the Indian Employment, Training and Related Services Demonstration Act of 1992 to facilitate the ability of Indian tribes to integrate the employment, training, and related services from diverse Federal sources, and for other purposes.	Pub. L. 115–93 (text) (PDF)
115-94	December 18, 2017	Department of State Authorities Act, Fiscal Year 2017, Improvements Act	To make technical changes and other improvements to the Department of State Authorities Act, Fiscal Year 2017.	Pub. L. 115–94 (text) (PDF)
115-95	December 20, 2017	Enhancing Veteran Care Act	To authorize the Secretary of Veterans Affairs to enter into contracts with nonprofit organizations to investigate medical centers of the Department of Veterans Affairs.	Pub. L. 115–95 (text) (PDF)
115-96	December 22, 2017	(No short title)	To amend the Homeland Security Act of 2002 to require the Secretary of Homeland Security to issue Department of Homeland Security-wide guidance and develop training programs as part of the Department of Homeland Security Blue Campaign, and for other purposes.	Pub. L. 115–96 (text) (PDF)
115-97	December 22, 2017	Tax Cuts and Jobs Act of 2017	To provide for reconciliation pursuant to titles II and V of the concurrent resolution on the budget for fiscal year 2018.	Pub. L. 115–97 (text) (PDF)
115-98	January 3, 2018	United States Fire Administration, AFG, and SAFER Program Reauthorization Act of 2017	To reauthorize the United States Fire Administration, the Assistance to Firefighters Grants program, the Fire Prevention and Safety Grants program, and the Staffing for Adequate Fire and Emergency Response grant program, and for other purposes.	Pub. L. 115–98 (text) (PDF)
115-99	January 3, 2018	Combating Human Trafficking in Commercial Vehicles Act	To designate a human trafficking prevention coordinator and to expand the scope of activities authorized under the Federal Motor Carrier Safety Administration's outreach and education program to include human trafficking prevention activities, and for other purposes.	Pub. L. 115–99 (text) (PDF)
115-100	January 3, 2018	(No short title)	To extend the period during which vessels that are shorter than 79 feet in length and fishing vessels are not required to have a permit for discharges incidental to the normal operation of the vessel.	Pub. L. 115–100 (text) (PDF)
115-101	January 8, 2018	(No short title)	To amend the Delaware Water Gap National Recreation Area Improvement Act to provide access to certain vehicles serving residents of municipalities adjacent to the Delaware Water Gap National Recreation Area, and for other purposes.	Pub. L. 115–101 (text) (PDF)
115-102	January 8, 2018	400 Years of African-American History Commission Act	To establish the 400 Years of African-American History Commission, and for other purposes.	Pub. L. 115–102 (text) (PDF)
115-103	January 8, 2018	Western Oregon Tribal Fairness Act	To provide for the conveyance of certain Federal land in the State of Oregon, and for other purposes.	Pub. L. 115–103 (text) (PDF)
115-104	January 8, 2018	African American Civil Rights Network Act of 2017	To amend title 54, United States Code, to establish within the National Park Service the African American Civil Rights Network, and for other purposes.	Pub. L. 115–104 (text) (PDF)
115-105	January 8, 2018	Jobs for Our Heroes Act	To streamline the process by which active duty military, reservists, and veterans receive commercial driver's licenses.	Pub. L. 115–105 (text) (PDF)
115-106	January 8, 2018	No Human Trafficking on Our Roads Act	To disqualify from operating a commercial motor vehicle for life an individual who uses a commercial motor vehicle in committing a felony involving human trafficking.	Pub. L. 115–106 (text) (PDF)
115-107	January 8, 2018	Sexual Assault Forensic Evidence Reporting Act of 2017 (or SAFER Act of 2017)	To reauthorize the SAFER Act of 2013, and for other purposes.	Pub. L. 115–107 (text) (PDF)
115-108	January 8, 2018	Martin Luther King, Jr. National Historical Park Act of 2017	To redesignate the Martin Luther King, Junior, National Historic Site in the State of Georgia, and for other purposes.	Pub. L. 115–108 (text) (PDF)
115-109	January 10, 2018	(No short title)	To designate a mountain in the John Muir Wilderness of the Sierra National Forest as "Sky Point".	Pub. L. 115–109 (text) (PDF)
115-110	January 10, 2018	Mount Hood Cooper Spur Land Exchange Clarification Act	To amend the Omnibus Public Land Management Act of 2009 to modify provisions relating to certain land exchanges in the Mt. Hood Wilderness in the State of Oregon.	Pub. L. 115–110 (text) (PDF)
115-111	January 10, 2018	(No short title)	To facilitate the addition of park administration at the Coltsville National Historical Park, and for other purposes.	Pub. L. 115–111 (text) (PDF)
115-112	January 10, 2018	International Narcotics Trafficking Emergency Response by Detecting Incoming Contraband with Technology Act (or INTERDICT Act)	To improve the ability of U.S. Customs and Border Protection to interdict fentanyl, other synthetic opioids, and other narcotics and psychoactive substances that are illegally imported into the United States, and for other purposes.	Pub. L. 115–112 (text) (PDF)
115-113	January 10, 2018	Law Enforcement Mental Health and Wellness Act of 2017	To provide support for law enforcement agency efforts to protect the mental health and well-being of law enforcement officers, and for other purposes.	Pub. L. 115–113 (text) (PDF)
115-114	January 10, 2018	Connected Government Act	To require a new or updated Federal website that is intended for use by the public to be mobile friendly, and for other purposes.	Pub. L. 115–114 (text) (PDF)
115-115	January 12, 2018	EPS Improvement Act of 2017	To amend the Energy Policy and Conservation Act to exclude power supply circuits, drivers, and devices designed to be connected to, and power, light-emitting diodes or organic light-emitting diodes providing illumination from energy conservation standards for external power supplies, and for other purposes.	Pub. L. 115–115 (text) (PDF)
115-116	January 12, 2018	(No short title)	To remove the use restrictions on certain land transferred to Rockingham County, Virginia, and for other purposes.	Pub. L. 115–116 (text) (PDF)
115-117	January 12, 2018	Little Rock Central High School National Historic Site Boundary Modification Act	To modify the boundary of the Little Rock Central High School National Historic Site, and for other purposes.	Pub. L. 115–117 (text) (PDF)
115-118	January 19, 2018	(No short title)	To amend the Foreign Intelligence Surveillance Act of 1978 to improve foreign intelligence collection and the safeguards, accountability, and oversight of acquisitions of foreign intelligence, to extend title VII of such Act, and for other purposes.	Pub. L. 115–118 (text) (PDF)
115-119	January 22, 2018	RAISE Family Caregivers Act	To provide for the establishment and maintenance of a Family Caregiving Strategy, and for other purposes.	Pub. L. 115–119 (text) (PDF)
115-120	January 22, 2018	(No short title)	Making further continuing appropriations for the fiscal year ending September 30, 2018, and for other purposes.	Pub. L. 115–120 (text) (PDF)
115-121	January 29, 2018	Thomasina E. Jordan Indian Tribes of Virginia Federal Recognition Act of 2017	To extend Federal recognition to the Chickahominy Indian Tribe, the Chickahominy Indian Tribe—Eastern Division, the Upper Mattaponi Tribe, the Rappahannock Tribe, Inc., the Monacan Indian Nation, and the Nansemond Indian Tribe.	Pub. L. 115–121 (text) (PDF)
115-122	January 31, 2018	Alex Diekmann Peak Designation Act of 2017	To designate a mountain peak in the State of Montana as Alex Diekmann Peak.	Pub. L. 115–122 (text) (PDF)
115-123	February 9, 2018	Bipartisan Budget Act of 2018, containing: Further Additional Supplemental Appropriations for Disaster Relief Requirements Act, 2018; Advancing Chronic Care, Extenders, and Social Services (ACCESS) Act; Honoring Hometown Heroes Act; Social Impact Partnerships to Pay for Results Act	To amend title 4, United States Code, to provide for the flying of the flag at half-staff in the event of the death of a first responder in the line of duty.	Pub. L. 115–123 (text) (PDF)
115-124	February 9, 2018	Continuing Appropriations Amendments Act, 2018	Making appropriations for the Department of Defense for the fiscal year ending September 30, 2017, and for other purposes.	Pub. L. 115–124 (text) (PDF)
115-125	February 14, 2018	Department of Homeland Security Blue Campaign Authorization Act	To amend the Homeland Security Act of 2002 to require the Secretary of Homeland Security to issue Department of Homeland Security-wide guidance and develop training programs as part of the Department of Homeland Security Blue Campaign, and for other purposes.	Pub. L. 115–125 (text) (PDF)
115-126	February 14, 2018	Protecting Young Victims from Sexual Abuse and Safe Sport Authorization Act of 2017	To prevent the sexual abuse of minors and amateur athletes by requiring the prompt reporting of sexual abuse to law enforcement authorities, and for other purposes.	Pub. L. 115–126 (text) (PDF)
115-127	February 16, 2018	Kari's Law Act of 2017	To amend the Communications Act of 1934 to require multi-line telephone systems to have a configuration that permits users to directly initiate a call to 9-1-1 without dialing any additional digit, code, prefix, or post-fix, and for other purposes.	Pub. L. 115–127 (text) (PDF)
115-128	February 22, 2018	Gateway Arch National Park Designation Act	To redesignate the Jefferson National Expansion Memorial in the State of Missouri as the "Gateway Arch National Park".	Pub. L. 115–128 (text) (PDF)
115-129	February 26, 2018	Improving Rural Call Quality and Reliability Act of 2017	To amend the Communications Act of 1934 to ensure the integrity of voice communications and to prevent unjust or unreasonable discrimination among areas of the United States in the delivery of such communications.	Pub. L. 115–129 (text) (PDF)
115-130	March 9, 2018	(No short title)	To direct the Secretary of Veterans Affairs to submit certain reports relating to medical evidence submitted in support of claims for benefits under the laws administered by the Secretary.	Pub. L. 115–130 (text) (PDF)
115-131	March 9, 2018	Veterans Care Financial Protection Act of 2017	To direct the Secretary of Veterans Affairs to include on the internet website of the Department of Veterans Affairs a warning regarding dishonest, predatory, or otherwise unlawful practices targeting individuals who are eligible for increased pension on the basis of need for regular aid and attendance, and for other purposes.	Pub. L. 115–131 (text) (PDF)
115-132	March 9, 2018	(No short title)	To designate the health care system of the Department of Veterans Affairs in Lexington, Kentucky, as the "Lexington VA Health Care System" and to make certain other designations.	Pub. L. 115–132 (text) (PDF)
115-133	March 16, 2018	(No short title)	To designate the facility of the United States Postal Service located at 2700 Cullen Boulevard in Pearland, Texas, as the "Endy Nddiobong Ekpanya Post Office Building".	Pub. L. 115–133 (text) (PDF)
115-134	March 16, 2018	(No short title)	To designate the facility of the United States Postal Service located at 324 West Saint Louis Street in Pacific, Missouri, as the "Specialist Jeffrey L. White, Jr. Post Office".	Pub. L. 115–134 (text) (PDF)
115-135	March 16, 2018	Taiwan Travel Act	To encourage visits between the United States and Taiwan at all levels, and for other purposes.	Pub. L. 115–135 (text) (PDF)
115-136	March 16, 2018	(No short title)	To amend title 38, United States Code, to provide for a consistent eligibility date for provision of Department of Veterans Affairs memorial headstones and markers for eligible spouses and dependent children of veterans whose remains are unavailable.	Pub. L. 115–136 (text) (PDF)
115-137	March 16, 2018	(No short title)	To designate the facility of the United States Postal Service located at 120 West Pike Street in Canonsburg, Pennsylvania, as the "Police Officer Scott Bashioum Post Office Building".	Pub. L. 115–137 (text) (PDF)
115-138	March 20, 2018	(No short title)	To designate the facility of the United States Postal Service located at 9155 Schaefer Road, Converse, Texas, as the "Converse Veterans Post Office Building".	Pub. L. 115–138 (text) (PDF)
115-139	March 20, 2018	(No short title)	To designate the facility of the United States Postal Service located at 4514 Williamson Trail in Liberty, Pennsylvania, as the "Staff Sergeant Ryan Scott Ostrom Post Office".	Pub. L. 115–139 (text) (PDF)
115-140	March 20, 2018	(No short title)	To designate the facility of the United States Postal Service located at 1730 18th Street in Bakersfield, California, as the "Merle Haggard Post Office Building".	Pub. L. 115–140 (text) (PDF)
115-141	March 23, 2018	Consolidated Appropriations Act, 2018	To amend the State Department Basic Authorities Act of 1956 to include severe forms of trafficking in persons within the definition of transnational organized crime for purposes of the rewards program of the Department of State, and for other purposes.	Pub. L. 115–141 (text) (PDF)
115-142	March 23, 2018	(No short title)	To designate the facility of the United States Postal Service located at 2635 Napa Street in Vallejo, California, as the "Janet Capello Post Office Building".	Pub. L. 115–142 (text) (PDF)
115-143	March 23, 2018	(No short title)	To designate the facility of the United States Postal Service located at 259 Nassau Street, Suite 2 in Princeton, New Jersey, as the "Dr. John F. Nash, Jr. Post Office".	Pub. L. 115–143 (text) (PDF)
115-144	March 23, 2018	(No short title)	To designate the facility of the United States Postal Service located at 25 New Chardon Street Lobby in Boston, Massachusetts, as the "John Fitzgerald Kennedy Post Office".	Pub. L. 115–144 (text) (PDF)
115-145	March 23, 2018	(No short title)	To designate the facility of the United States Postal Service located at 520 Carter Street in Fairview, Illinois, as the "Sgt. Douglas J. Riney Post Office".	Pub. L. 115–145 (text) (PDF)
115-146	March 23, 2018	(No short title)	To designate the facility of the United States Postal Service located at 30 East Somerset Street in Raritan, New Jersey, as the "Gunnery Sergeant John Basilone Post Office".	Pub. L. 115–146 (text) (PDF)
115-147	March 23, 2018	(No short title)	To designate the facility of the United States Postal Service located at 207 Glenside Avenue in Wyncote, Pennsylvania, as the "Staff Sergeant Peter Taub Post Office Building".	Pub. L. 115–147 (text) (PDF)
115-148	March 23, 2018	(No short title)	To designate the facility of the United States Postal Service located at 1114 North 2nd Street in Chillicothe, Illinois, as the "Sr. Chief Ryan Owens Post Office Building".	Pub. L. 115–148 (text) (PDF)
115-149	March 23, 2018	(No short title)	To designate the facility of the United States Postal Service located at 225 North Main Street in Spring Lake, North Carolina, as the "Howard B. Pate, Jr. Post Office".	Pub. L. 115–149 (text) (PDF)
115-150	March 23, 2018	(No short title)	To designate the facility of the United States Postal Service located at 1100 Kings Road in Jacksonville, Florida, as the "Rutledge Pearson Post Office Building".	Pub. L. 115–150 (text) (PDF)
115-151	March 23, 2018	(No short title)	To designate the facility of the United States Postal Service located at 1300 Main Street in Belmar, New Jersey, as the "Dr. Walter S. McAfee Post Office Building".	Pub. L. 115–151 (text) (PDF)
115-152	March 23, 2018	(No short title)	To designate the facility of the United States Postal Service located at 430 Main Street in Clermont, Georgia, as the "Zack T. Addington Post Office".	Pub. L. 115–152 (text) (PDF)
115-153	March 23, 2018	(No short title)	To designate the facility of the United States Postal Service located at 100 Mathe Avenue in Interlachen, Florida, as the "Robert H. Jenkins, Jr. Post Office".	Pub. L. 115–153 (text) (PDF)
115-154	March 23, 2018	(No short title)	To designate the facility of the United States Postal Service located at 1415 West Oak Street, in Kissimmee, Florida, as the "Borinqueneers Post Office Building".	Pub. L. 115–154 (text) (PDF)
115-155	March 23, 2018	(No short title)	To designate the facility of the United States Postal Service located at 123 Bridgeton Pike in Mullica Hill, New Jersey, as the "James C. 'Billy' Johnson Post Office Building".	Pub. L. 115–155 (text) (PDF)
115-156	March 26, 2018	Removing Outdated Restrictions to Allow for Job Growth Act	To direct the Secretary of Agriculture to release on behalf of the United States the condition that certain lands conveyed to the City of Old Town, Maine, be used for a municipal airport, and for other purposes.	Pub. L. 115–156 (text) (PDF)
115-157	March 27, 2018	(No short title)	To rename the Red River Valley Agricultural Research Center in Fargo, North Dakota, as the Edward T. Schafer Agricultural Research Center.	Pub. L. 115–157 (text) (PDF)
115-158	March 27, 2018	EGO Act	To amend title 31, United States Code, to prohibit the use of Federal funds for the costs of painting portraits of officers and employees of the Federal Government, and for other purposes.	Pub. L. 115–158 (text) (PDF)
115-159	March 27, 2018	State Veterans Home Adult Day Health Care Improvement Act of 2017	To amend title 38, United States Code, to improve the provision of adult day health care services for veterans.	Pub. L. 115–159 (text) (PDF)
115-160	April 3, 2018	Secret Service Recruitment and Retention Act of 2018	To provide overtime pay for employees of the United States Secret Service, and for other purposes.	Pub. L. 115–160 (text) (PDF)
115-161	April 3, 2018	Ceiling Fan Energy Conservation Harmonization Act	To deem the compliance date for amended energy conservation standards for ceiling fan light kits to be January 21, 2020, and for other purposes.	Pub. L. 115–161 (text) (PDF)
115-162	April 3, 2018	(No short title)	To designate the facility of the United States Postal Service located at 621 Kansas Avenue in Atchison, Kansas, as the "Amelia Earhart Post Office Building".	Pub. L. 115–162 (text) (PDF)
115-163	April 4, 2018	Kennedy-King National Commemorative Site Act	To establish the Kennedy-King National Commemorative Site in the State of Indiana, and for other purposes.	Pub. L. 115–163 (text) (PDF)
115-164	April 11, 2018	Allow States and Victims to Fight Online Sex Trafficking Act of 2017	To amend the Communications Act of 1934 to clarify that section 230 of such Act does not prohibit the enforcement against providers and users of interactive computer services of Federal and State criminal and civil law relating to sexual exploitation of children or sex trafficking, and for other purposes.	Pub. L. 115–164 (text) (PDF)
115-165	April 13, 2018	Strengthening Protections for Social Security Beneficiaries Act of 2018	To amend titles II, VIII, and XVI of the Social Security Act to improve and strengthen the representative payment program.	Pub. L. 115–165 (text) (PDF)
115-166	April 13, 2018	Ashlynne Mike AMBER Alert in Indian Country Act	To amend the PROTECT Act to make Indian tribes eligible for AMBER Alert grants.	Pub. L. 115–166 (text) (PDF)
115-167	April 23, 2018	AGOA and MCA Modernization Act	To enhance the transparency and accelerate the impact of programs under the African Growth and Opportunity Act and the Millennium Challenge Corporation, and for other purposes.	Pub. L. 115–167 (text) (PDF)
115-168	April 23, 2018	Keep America's Refuges Operational Act	To amend the Fish and Wildlife Act of 1956 to reauthorize the volunteer services, community partnership, and refuge education programs of the National Wildlife Refuge System, and for other purposes.	Pub. L. 115–168 (text) (PDF)
115-169	April 30, 2018	National Memorial to Fallen Educators Act	To designate a National Memorial to Fallen Educators at the National Teachers Hall of Fame in Emporia, Kansas.	Pub. L. 115–169 (text) (PDF)
115-170	May 7, 2018	Admiral Lloyd R. "Joe" Vasey Pacific War Commemorative Display Establishment Act	To authorize Pacific Historic Parks to establish a commemorative display to honor members of the United States Armed Forces who served in the Pacific Theater of World War II, and for other purposes.	Pub. L. 115–170 (text) (PDF)
115-171	May 9, 2018	Justice for Uncompensated Survivors Today (JUST) Act of 2017	To require reporting on acts of certain foreign countries on Holocaust era assets and related issues.	Pub. L. 115–171 (text) (PDF)
115-172	May 21, 2018	(No short title)	A joint resolution providing for congressional disapproval under chapter 8 of title 5, United States Code, of the rule submitted by Bureau of Consumer Financial Protection relating to "Indirect Auto Lending and Compliance with the Equal Credit Opportunity Act".	Pub. L. 115–172 (text) (PDF)
115-173	May 22, 2018	Securely Expediting Clearances Through Reporting Transparency Act of 2018	To require the Director of the National Background Investigations Bureau to submit a report on the backlog of personnel security clearance investigations, and for other purposes.	Pub. L. 115–173 (text) (PDF)
115-174	May 24, 2018	Economic Growth, Regulatory Relief and Consumer Protection Act	To promote economic growth, provide tailored regulatory relief, and enhance consumer protections, and for other purposes.	Pub. L. 115–174 (text) (PDF)
115-175	May 25, 2018	Black Hills National Cemetery Boundary Expansion Act	To transfer administrative jurisdiction over certain Bureau of Land Management land from the Secretary of the Interior to the Secretary of Veterans Affairs for inclusion in the Black Hills National Cemetery, and for other purposes.	Pub. L. 115–175 (text) (PDF)
115-176	May 30, 2018	Trickett Wendler, Frank Mongiello, Jordan McLinn, and Matthew Bellina Right to Try Act of 2017	To authorize the use of unapproved medical products by patients diagnosed with a terminal illness in accordance with State law, and for other purposes.	Pub. L. 115–176 (text) (PDF)
115-177	June 1, 2018	(No short title)	To amend title 38, United States Code, to authorize the Secretary of Veterans Affairs to furnish assistance for adaptations of residences of veterans in rehabilitation programs under chapter 31 of such title, and for other purposes.	Pub. L. 115–177 (text) (PDF)
115-178	June 1, 2018	Smithsonian National Zoological Park Central Parking Facility Authorization Act	To authorize the Board of Regents of the Smithsonian Institution to plan, design, and construct a central parking facility on National Zoological Park property in the District of Columbia.	Pub. L. 115–178 (text) (PDF)
115-179	June 1, 2018	Oregon Tribal Economic Development Act	To allow the Confederated Tribes of Coos, Lower Umpqua, and Siuslaw Indians, the Confederated Tribes of the Grand Ronde Community of Oregon, the Confederated Tribes of Siletz Indians of Oregon, the Confederated Tribes of Warm Springs, the Cow Creek Band of Umpqua Tribe of Indians, the Klamath Tribes, and the Burns Paiute Tribes to lease or transfer certain lands.	Pub. L. 115–179 (text) (PDF)
115-180	June 5, 2018	Childhood Cancer Survivorship, Treatment, Access, and Research Act of 2018	To maximize discovery, and accelerate development and availability, of promising childhood cancer treatments, and for other purposes.	Pub. L. 115–180 (text) (PDF)
115-181	June 5, 2018	(No short title)	To redesignate certain clinics of the Department of Veterans Affairs located in Montana.	Pub. L. 115–181 (text) (PDF)
115-182	June 6, 2018	VA MISSION Act of 2018	To amend title 38, United States Code, to provide outer burial receptacles for remains buried in National Parks, and for other purposes.	Pub. L. 115–182 (text) (PDF)
115-183	June 15, 2018	(No short title)	To designate the medical center of the Department of Veterans Affairs in Huntington, West Virginia, as the Hershel "Woody" Williams VA Medical Center.	Pub. L. 115–183 (text) (PDF)
115-184	June 15, 2018	Veterans Cemetery Benefit Correction Act	To amend title 38, United States Code, to provide outer burial receptacles for remains buried in National Parks, and for other purposes.	Pub. L. 115–184 (text) (PDF)
115-185	June 18, 2018	Project Safe Neighborhoods Grant Program Authorization Act of 2018	To authorize the Project Safe Neighborhoods Grant Program, and for other purposes.	Pub. L. 115–185 (text) (PDF)
115-186	June 21, 2018	National Veterans Memorial and Museum Act	To designate the Veterans Memorial and Museum in Columbus, Ohio, as the National Veterans Memorial and Museum, and for other purposes.	Pub. L. 115–186 (text) (PDF)
115-187	June 21, 2018	Small Business Investment Opportunity Act of 2017	To amend the Small Business Investment Act of 1958 to increase the amount of leverage made available to small business investment companies.	Pub. L. 115–187 (text) (PDF)
115-188	June 21, 2018	SEA Act of 2018	To amend title 38, United States Code, to provide for requirements relating to the reassignment of Department of Veterans Affairs senior executive employees.	Pub. L. 115–188 (text) (PDF)
115-189	June 21, 2018	Small Business 7(a) Lending Oversight Reform Act of 2018	To amend the Small Business Act to strengthen the Office of Credit Risk Management within the Small Business Administration, and for other purposes.	Pub. L. 115–189 (text) (PDF)
115-190	June 22, 2018	(No short title)	To authorize, direct, facilitate, and expedite the transfer of administrative jurisdiction of certain Federal land, and for other purposes.	Pub. L. 115–190 (text) (PDF)
115-191	June 22, 2018	John Muir National Historic Site Expansion Act	To authorize the Secretary of the Interior to acquire approximately 44 acres of land in Martinez, California, for inclusion in the John Muir National Historic Site, and for other purposes.	Pub. L. 115–191 (text) (PDF)
115-192	June 25, 2018	Whistleblower Protection Coordination Act	To reauthorize and rename the position of Whistleblower Ombudsman to be the Whistleblower Protection Coordinator.	Pub. L. 115–192 (text) (PDF)
115-193	June 25, 2018	(No short title)	To designate the health care center of the Department of Veterans Affairs in Tallahassee, Florida, as the Sergeant Ernest I. "Boots" Thomas VA Clinic, and for other purposes.	Pub. L. 115–193 (text) (PDF)
115-194	July 7, 2018	Firefighter Cancer Registry Act of 2018	To require the Secretary of Health and Human Services to develop a voluntary registry to collect data on cancer incidence among firefighters.	Pub. L. 115–194 (text) (PDF)
115-195	July 7, 2018	All Circuit Review Act	To amend title 5, United States Code, to provide permanent authority for judicial review of certain Merit Systems Protection Board decisions relating to whistleblowers, and for other purposes.	Pub. L. 115–195 (text) (PDF)
115-196	July 7, 2018	Supporting Grandparents Raising Grandchildren Act	To establish a Federal Advisory Council to Support Grandparents Raising Grandchildren.	Pub. L. 115–196 (text) (PDF)
115-197	July 20, 2018	American Innovation $1 Coin Act	To require the Secretary of the Treasury to mint coins in recognition of American innovation and significant innovation and pioneering efforts of individuals or groups from each of the 50 States, the District of Columbia, and the United States territories, to promote the importance of innovation in the United States, the District of Columbia, and the United States territories, and for other purposes.	Pub. L. 115–197 (text) (PDF)
115-198	July 20, 2018	North Korean Human Rights Reauthorization Act of 2017	To reauthorize the North Korean Human Rights Act of 2004, and for other purposes.	Pub. L. 115–198 (text) (PDF)
115-199	July 20, 2018	(No short title)	A joint resolution providing for the reappointment of Barbara M. Barrett as a citizen regent of the Board of Regents of the Smithsonian Institution.	Pub. L. 115–199 (text) (PDF)
115-200	July 20, 2018	Swan Lake Hydroelectric Project Boundary Correction Act	To correct the Swan Lake hydroelectric project survey boundary and to provide for the conveyance of the remaining tract of land within the corrected survey boundary to the State of Alaska.	Pub. L. 115–200 (text) (PDF)
115-201	July 20, 2018	(No short title)	To authorize the expansion of an existing hydroelectric project, and for other purposes.	Pub. L. 115–201 (text) (PDF)
115-202	July 23, 2018	(No short title)	To extend the deadline for commencement of construction of a hydroelectric project.	Pub. L. 115–202 (text) (PDF)
115-203	July 23, 2018	(No short title)	To extend the deadline for commencement of construction of a hydroelectric project.	Pub. L. 115–203 (text) (PDF)
115-204	July 23, 2018	(No short title)	To extend the deadline for commencement of construction of a hydroelectric project.	Pub. L. 115–204 (text) (PDF)
115-205	July 23, 2018	(No short title)	To reinstate and extend the deadline for commencement of construction of a hydroelectric project involving Jennings Randolph Dam.	Pub. L. 115–205 (text) (PDF)
115-206	July 23, 2018	(No short title)	To extend a project of the Federal Energy Regulatory Commission involving the Cannonsville Dam.	Pub. L. 115–206 (text) (PDF)
115-207	July 24, 2018	(No short title)	To designate the facility of the United States Postal Service located at 3585 South Vermont Avenue in Los Angeles, California, as the "Marvin Gaye Post Office".	Pub. L. 115–207 (text) (PDF)
115-208	July 24, 2018	(No short title)	To designate the facility of the United States Postal Service located at 514 Broadway Street in Pekin, Illinois, as the "Lance Corporal Jordan S. Bastean Post Office".	Pub. L. 115–208 (text) (PDF)
115-209	July 24, 2018	(No short title)	To designate the facility of the United States Postal Service located at 13683 James Madison Highway in Palmyra, Virginia, as the "U.S. Navy Seaman Dakota Kyle Rigsby Post Office".	Pub. L. 115–209 (text) (PDF)
115-210	July 24, 2018	(No short title)	To designate the facility of the United States Postal Service located at 201 Tom Hall Street in Fort Mill, South Carolina, as the "J. Elliott Williams Post Office Building".	Pub. L. 115–210 (text) (PDF)
115-211	July 24, 2018	(No short title)	To designate the facility of the United States Postal Service located at 99 Macombs Place in New York, New York, as the "Tuskegee Airmen Post Office Building".	Pub. L. 115–211 (text) (PDF)
115-212	July 24, 2018	(No short title)	To designate the facility of the United States Postal Service located at 6 Doyers Street in New York, New York, as the "Mabel Lee Memorial Post Office".	Pub. L. 115–212 (text) (PDF)
115-213	July 24, 2018	(No short title)	To designate the facility of the United States Postal Service located at 108 West Schick Road in Bloomingdale, Illinois, as the "Bloomingdale Veterans Memorial Post Office Building".	Pub. L. 115–213 (text) (PDF)
115-214	July 24, 2018	(No short title)	To designate the facility of the United States Postal Service located at 1900 Corporate Drive in Birmingham, Alabama, as the "Lance Corporal Thomas E. Rivers, Jr. Post Office Building".	Pub. L. 115–214 (text) (PDF)
115-215	July 24, 2018	(No short title)	To designate the facility of the United States Postal Service located at 515 Hope Street in Bristol, Rhode Island, as the "First Sergeant P. Andrew McKenna Jr. Post Office".	Pub. L. 115–215 (text) (PDF)
115-216	July 24, 2018	(No short title)	To designate the facility of the United States Postal Service located at 111 Market Street in Saugerties, New York, as the "Maurice D. Hinchey Post Office Building".	Pub. L. 115–216 (text) (PDF)
115-217	July 24, 2018	(No short title)	To designate the facility of the United States Postal Service located at 567 East Franklin Street in Oviedo, Florida, as the "Sergeant First Class Alwyn Crendall Cashe Post Office Building".	Pub. L. 115–217 (text) (PDF)
115-218	July 24, 2018	Northern Mariana Islands U.S. Workforce Act of 2018	To incentivize the hiring of United States workers in the Commonwealth of the Northern Mariana Islands, and for other purposes.	Pub. L. 115–218 (text) (PDF)
115-219	July 27, 2018	(No short title)	To reinstate and extend the deadline for commencement of construction of a hydroelectric project involving the Gibson Dam.	Pub. L. 115–219 (text) (PDF)
115-220	July 27, 2018	(No short title)	To designate the facility of the United States Postal Service located at 4910 Brighton Boulevard in Denver, Colorado, as the "George Sakato Post Office".	Pub. L. 115–220 (text) (PDF)
115-221	July 27, 2018	(No short title)	To designate the Federal building and United States courthouse located at 1300 Victoria Street in Laredo, Texas, as the "George P. Kazen Federal Building and United States Courthouse".	Pub. L. 115–221 (text) (PDF)
115-222	July 30, 2018	(No short title)	To amend title XIX of the Social Security Act to delay the reduction in Federal medical assistance percentage for Medicaid personal care services furnished without an electronic visit verification system, and for other purposes.	Pub. L. 115–222 (text) (PDF)
115-223	July 30, 2018	(No short title)	To designate the facility of the United States Postal Service located at 4558 Broadway in New York, New York, as the "Stanley Michels Post Office Building".	Pub. L. 115–223 (text) (PDF)
115-224	July 31, 2018	Strengthening Career and Technical Education for the 21st Century Act	To reauthorize the Carl D. Perkins Career and Technical Education Act of 2006.	Pub. L. 115–224 (text) (PDF)
115-225	July 31, 2018	National Flood Insurance Program Extension Act of 2018	To extend the National Flood Insurance Program, and for other purposes.	Pub. L. 115–225 (text) (PDF)
115-226	August 1, 2018	KIWI Act	To include New Zealand in the list of foreign states whose nationals are eligible for admission into the United States as E-1 and E-2 nonimmigrants if United States nationals are treated similarly by the Government of New Zealand.	Pub. L. 115–226 (text) (PDF)
115-227	August 1, 2018	(No short title)	To amend the White Mountain Apache Tribe Water Rights Quantification Act of 2010 to clarify the use of amounts in the WMAT Settlement Fund.	Pub. L. 115–227 (text) (PDF)
115-228	August 2, 2018	(No short title)	To make technical amendments to certain marine fish conservation statutes, and for other purposes.	Pub. L. 115–228 (text) (PDF)
115-229	August 2, 2018	East Rosebud Wild and Scenic Rivers Act	To amend the Wild and Scenic Rivers Act to designate certain segments of East Rosebud Creek in Carbon County, Montana, as components of the Wild and Scenic Rivers System.	Pub. L. 115–229 (text) (PDF)
115-230	August 2, 2018	Transportation Worker Identification Credential Accountability Act of 2018	To restrict the department in which the Coast Guard is operating from implementing any rule requiring the use of biometric readers for biometric transportation security cards until after submission to Congress of the results of an assessment of the effectiveness of the transportation security card program.	Pub. L. 115–230 (text) (PDF)
115-231	August 8, 2018	Zimbabwe Democracy and Economic Recovery Amendment Act of 2018	To amend the Zimbabwe Democracy and Economic Recovery Act of 2001.	Pub. L. 115–231 (text) (PDF)
115-232	August 13, 2018	John S. McCain National Defense Authorization Act for Fiscal Year 2019	To authorize appropriations for fiscal year 2019 for military activities of the Department of Defense, for military construction, and for defense activities of the Department of Energy, to prescribe military personnel strengths for such fiscal year, and for other purposes.	Pub. L. 115–232 (text) (PDF)
115-233	August 14, 2018	National Suicide Hotline Improvement Act of 2018	To require the Federal Communications Commission to study the feasibility of designating a simple, easy-to-remember dialing code to be used for a national suicide prevention and mental health crisis hotline system.	Pub. L. 115–233 (text) (PDF)
115-234	August 14, 2018	Animal Drug and Animal Generic Drug User Fee Amendments of 2018	To amend the Federal Food, Drug, and Cosmetic Act to reauthorize user fee programs relating to new animal drugs and generic new animal drugs.	Pub. L. 115–234 (text) (PDF)
115-235	August 14, 2018	(No short title)	To amend title 23, United States Code, to extend the deadline for promulgation of regulations under the tribal transportation self-governance program.	Pub. L. 115–235 (text) (PDF)
115-236	August 14, 2018	NIST Small Business Cybersecurity Act	To require the Director of the National Institute of Standards and Technology to disseminate guidance to help reduce small business cybersecurity risks, and for other purposes.	Pub. L. 115–236 (text) (PDF)
115-237	September 4, 2018	Pro bono Work to Empower and Represent Act of 2018 (or POWER Act)	To promote pro bono legal services as a critical way in which to empower survivors of domestic violence.	Pub. L. 115–237 (text) (PDF)
115-238	September 7, 2018	Veterans Providing Healthcare Transition Improvement Act	To amend title 5, United States Code, to ensure that the requirements that new Federal employees who are veterans with service-connected disabilities are provided leave for purposes of undergoing medical treatment for such disabilities apply to certain employees of the Veterans Health Administration.	Pub. L. 115–238 (text) (PDF)
115-239	September 13, 2018	Miscellaneous Tariff Bill Act of 2018	To amend the Harmonized Tariff Schedule of the United States to modify temporarily certain rates of duty.	Pub. L. 115–239 (text) (PDF)
115-240	September 17, 2018	Veterans Treatment Court Improvement Act of 2018	To require the Secretary of Veterans Affairs to hire additional Veterans Justice Outreach Specialists to provide treatment court services to justice-involved veterans, and for other purposes.	Pub. L. 115–240 (text) (PDF)
115-241	September 18, 2018	Dr. Benjy Frances Brooks Children's Hospital GME Support Reauthorization Act of 2018	To amend the Public Health Service Act to reauthorize the program of payments to children's hospitals that operate graduate medical education programs, and for other purposes.	Pub. L. 115–241 (text) (PDF)
115-242	September 18, 2018	(No short title)	To designate the J. Marvin Jones Federal Building and Courthouse in Amarillo, Texas, as the "J. Marvin Jones Federal Building and Mary Lou Robinson United States Courthouse".	Pub. L. 115–242 (text) (PDF)
115-243	September 20, 2018	Tribal Social Security Fairness Act of 2018	To amend title II of the Social Security Act to authorize voluntary agreements for coverage of Indian tribal council members, and for other purposes.	Pub. L. 115–243 (text) (PDF)
115-244	September 21, 2018	Energy and Water, Legislative Branch, and Military Construction and Veterans Affairs Appropriations Act, 2019	Making appropriations for energy and water development and related agencies for the fiscal year ending September 30, 2019, and for other purposes.	Pub. L. 115–244 (text) (PDF)
115-245	September 28, 2018	Department of Defense and Labor, Health and Human Services, and Education Appropriations Act, 2019 and Continuing Appropriations Act, 2019	Making appropriations for the Department of Defense for the fiscal year ending September 30, 2019, and for other purposes.	Pub. L. 115–245 (text) (PDF)
115-246	September 28, 2018	Department of Energy Research and Innovation Act	To establish Department of Energy policy for science and energy research and development programs, and reform National Laboratory management and technology transfer programs, and for other purposes.	Pub. L. 115–246 (text) (PDF)
115-247	September 28, 2018	(No short title)	To amend section 203 of the Federal Power Act.	Pub. L. 115–247 (text) (PDF)
115-248	September 28, 2018	Nuclear Energy Innovation Capabilities Act of 2017	To enable civilian research and development of advanced nuclear energy technologies by private and public institutions, to expand theoretical and practical knowledge of nuclear physics, chemistry, and materials science, and for other purposes.	Pub. L. 115–248 (text) (PDF)
115-249	September 28, 2018	Protecting Religiously Affiliated Institutions Act of 2018	To amend title 18, United States Code, to provide for the protection of community centers with religious affiliation, and for other purposes.	Pub. L. 115–249 (text) (PDF)
115-250	September 29, 2018	Airport and Airway Extension Act of 2018, Part II	To extend the authorizations of Federal aviation programs, to extend the funding and expenditure authority of the Airport and Airway Trust Fund, and for other purposes.	Pub. L. 115–250 (text) (PDF)
115-251	September 29, 2018	Department of Veterans Affairs Expiring Authorities Act of 2018	To amend title 38, United States Code, to extend certain expiring provisions of law administered by the U.S. Secretary of Veterans Affairs, and for other purposes.	Pub. L. 115–251 (text) (PDF)
115-252	October 3, 2018	Elkhorn Ranch and White River National Forest Conveyance Act of 2017	To require a land conveyance involving the Elkhorn Ranch and the White River National Forest in the State of Colorado, and for other purposes.	Pub. L. 115–252 (text) (PDF)
115-253	October 3, 2018	Anti-Terrorism Clarification Act of 2018	To amend title 18, United States Code, to clarify the meaning of the terms "act of war" and "blocked asset", and for other purposes.	Pub. L. 115–253 (text) (PDF)
115-254	October 5, 2018	FAA Reauthorization Act of 2018	To provide protections for certain sports medicine professionals who provide certain medical services in a secondary State.	Pub. L. 115–254 (text) (PDF)
115-255	October 9, 2018	Fort Ontario Study Act	To authorize the U.S. Secretary of the Interior to conduct a special resource study of Fort Ontario in the State of New York.	Pub. L. 115–255 (text) (PDF)
115-256	October 9, 2018	Sam Farr and Nick Castle Peace Corps Reform Act of 2018	To amend the Peace Corps Act to expand services and benefits for volunteers, and for other purposes.	Pub. L. 115–256 (text) (PDF)
115-257	October 9, 2018	Justice Served Act of 2018	To amend the DNA Analysis Backlog Elimination Act of 2000 to provide additional resources to State and local prosecutors, and for other purposes.	Pub. L. 115–257 (text) (PDF)
115-258	October 9, 2018	Veterans' Compensation Cost-of-Living Adjustment Act of 2018	To increase, effective as of December 1, 2018, the rates of compensation for veterans with service-connected disabilities and the rates of dependency and indemnity compensation for the survivors of certain disabled veterans, and for other purposes.	Pub. L. 115–258 (text) (PDF)
115-259	October 9, 2018	Small Business Innovation Protection Act of 2017	To amend the Small Business Act to expand intellectual property education and training for small businesses, and for other purposes.	Pub. L. 115–259 (text) (PDF)
115-260	October 9, 2018	(No short title)	To rename a waterway in the State of New York as the "Joseph Sanford Jr. Channel".	Pub. L. 115–260 (text) (PDF)
115-261	October 9, 2018	Marrakesh Treaty Implementation Act	To amend title 17, United States Code, to implement the Marrakesh Treaty, and for other purposes.	Pub. L. 115–261 (text) (PDF)
115-262	October 10, 2018	Know the Lowest Price Act of 2018	To amend title XVIII of the Social Security Act to prohibit Medicare Part D plans from restricting pharmacies from informing individuals regarding the prices for certain drugs and biologicals.	Pub. L. 115–262 (text) (PDF)
115-263	October 10, 2018	Patient Right to Know Drug Prices Act	To ensure that health insurance issuers and group health plans do not prohibit pharmacy providers from providing certain information to enrollees.	Pub. L. 115–263 (text) (PDF)
115-264	October 11, 2018	Orrin G. Hatch-Bob Goodlatte Music Modernization Act	To amend the Internal Revenue Code of 1986 to modify the credit for production from advanced nuclear power facilities.	Pub. L. 115–264 (text) (PDF)
115-265	October 11, 2018	Save Our Seas Act of 2018	To reauthorize and amend the Marine Debris Act to promote international action to reduce marine debris, and for other purposes.	Pub. L. 115–265 (text) (PDF)
115-266	October 11, 2018	Global Food Security Reauthorization Act of 2017	To reauthorize the Global Food Security Act of 2016 for 5 additional years.	Pub. L. 115–266 (text) (PDF)
115-267	October 11, 2018	Missing Children's Assistance Act of 2018	To amend the Missing Children's Assistance Act, and for other purposes.	Pub. L. 115–267 (text) (PDF)
115-268	October 11, 2018	Congressional Award Program Reauthorization Act of 2018	To reauthorize the Congressional Award Act.	Pub. L. 115–268 (text) (PDF)
115-269	October 16, 2018	STB Information Security Improvement Act	To require the Surface Transportation Board to implement certain recommendations of the Inspector General of the Department of Transportation.	Pub. L. 115–269 (text) (PDF)
115-270	October 23, 2018	America's Water Infrastructure Act of 2018	To provide for improvements to the rivers and harbors of the United States, to provide for the conservation and development of water and related resources, to provide for water pollution control activities, and for other purposes.	Pub. L. 115–270 (text) (PDF)
115-271	October 24, 2018	SUPPORT for Patients and Communities Act	To provide for opioid use disorder prevention, recovery, and treatment, and for other purposes.	Pub. L. 115–271 (text) (PDF)
115-272	October 25, 2018	Hizballah International Financing Prevention Amendments Act of 2018	To amend the Hizballah International Financing Prevention Act of 2015 to impose additional sanctions with respect to Hizballah, and for other purposes.	Pub. L. 115–272 (text) (PDF)
115-273	October 31, 2018	SUCCESS Act	To direct the Under Secretary of Commerce for Intellectual Property and Director of the United States Patent and Trademark Office, in consultation with the Administrator of the Small Business Administration, to study and provide recommendations to promote the participation of women, minorities, and veterans in entrepreneurship activities and the patent system, to extend by 8 years the Patent and Trademark Office's authority to set the amounts for the fees it charges, and for other purposes.	Pub. L. 115–273 (text) (PDF)
115-274	October 31, 2018	United States Parole Commission Extension Act of 2018	To provide for the continued performance of the functions of the United States Parole Commission, and for other purposes.	Pub. L. 115–274 (text) (PDF)
115-275	November 3, 2018	(No short title)	To authorize the National Emergency Medical Services Memorial Foundation to establish a commemorative work in the District of Columbia and its environs, and for other purposes.	Pub. L. 115–275 (text) (PDF)
115-276	November 3, 2018	9/11 Heroes Medal of Valor Act of 2017	To provide that members of public safety agencies who died of 9/11-related health conditions are eligible for the Presidential 9/11 Heroes Medal of Valor, and for other purposes.	Pub. L. 115–276 (text) (PDF)
115-277	November 3, 2018	(No short title)	To rename the Stop Trading on Congressional Knowledge Act of 2012 in honor of Representative Louise McIntosh Slaughter.	Pub. L. 115–277 (text) (PDF)
115-278	November 16, 2018	Cybersecurity and Infrastructure Security Agency Act of 2018	To amend the Homeland Security Act of 2002 to authorize the Cybersecurity and Infrastructure Security Agency of the U.S. Department of Homeland Security, and for other purposes.	Pub. L. 115–278 (text) (PDF)
115-279	November 20, 2018	Gulf Islands National Seashore Land Exchange Act	To authorize the exchange of certain land located in Gulf Islands National Seashore, Jackson County, Mississippi, between the National Park Service and the Veterans of Foreign Wars, and for other purposes.	Pub. L. 115–279 (text) (PDF)
115-280	November 29, 2018	(No short title)	To extend the effective date for the sunset for collateral requirements for Small Business Administration disaster loans.	Pub. L. 115–280 (text) (PDF)
115-281	December 1, 2018	National Flood Insurance Program Further Extension Act of 2018	To extend the National Flood Insurance Program until December 7, 2018.	Pub. L. 115–281 (text) (PDF)
115-282	December 4, 2018	Frank LoBiondo Coast Guard Authorization Act of 2018	To amend the White Mountain Apache Tribe Water Rights Quantification Act of 2010 to clarify the use of amounts in the WMAT Settlement Fund.	Pub. L. 115–282 (text) (PDF)
115-283	December 6, 2018	(No short title)	To designate the facility of the United States Postal Service located at 1025 Nevin Avenue in Richmond, California, as the "Harold D. McCraw, Sr., Post Office Building".	Pub. L. 115–283 (text) (PDF)
115-284	December 6, 2018	(No short title)	To designate the facility of the United States Postal Service located at 901 N. Francisco Avenue, Mission, Texas, as the "Mission Veterans Post Office Building".	Pub. L. 115–284 (text) (PDF)
115-285	December 6, 2018	(No short title)	To designate the facility of the United States Postal Service located at 390 West 5th Street in San Bernardino, California, as the "Jack H. Brown Post Office Building".	Pub. L. 115–285 (text) (PDF)
115-286	December 6, 2018	(No short title)	To designate the facility of the United States Postal Service located at 915 Center Avenue in Payette, Idaho, as the "Harmon Killebrew Post Office Building".	Pub. L. 115–286 (text) (PDF)
115-287	December 6, 2018	(No short title)	To designate the facility of the United States Postal Service located at 9801 Apollo Drive in Upper Marlboro, Maryland, as the "Wayne K. Curry Post Office Building".	Pub. L. 115–287 (text) (PDF)
115-288	December 6, 2018	(No short title)	To designate the facility of the United States Postal Service located at 816 East Salisbury Parkway in Salisbury, Maryland, as the "Sgt. Maj. Wardell B. Turner Post Office Building".	Pub. L. 115–288 (text) (PDF)
115-289	December 6, 2018	(No short title)	To designate the facility of the United States Postal Service located at 1075 North Tustin Street in Orange, California, as the "Specialist Trevor A. Win'E Post Office".	Pub. L. 115–289 (text) (PDF)
115-290	December 6, 2018	(No short title)	To designate the facility of the United States Postal Service located at 511 East Walnut Street in Columbia, Missouri, as the "Spc. Sterling William Wyatt Post Office Building".	Pub. L. 115–290 (text) (PDF)
115-291	December 6, 2018	(No short title)	To designate the facility of the United States Postal Service located at 1325 Autumn Avenue in Memphis, Tennessee, as the "Judge Russell B. Sugarmon Post Office Building".	Pub. L. 115–291 (text) (PDF)
115-292	December 6, 2018	(No short title)	To designate the facility of the United States Postal Service located at 4801 West Van Giesen Street in West Richland, Washington, as the "Sergeant Dietrich Schmieman Post Office Building".	Pub. L. 115–292 (text) (PDF)
115-293	December 6, 2018	(No short title)	To designate the facility of the United States Postal Service located at 108 West D Street in Alpha, Illinois, as the "Captain Joshua E. Steele Post Office".	Pub. L. 115–293 (text) (PDF)
115-294	December 6, 2018	(No short title)	To designate the facility of the United States Postal Service located at 2650 North Doctor Martin Luther King Jr. Drive in Milwaukee, Wisconsin, shall be known and designated as the "Vel R. Phillips Post Office Building".	Pub. L. 115–294 (text) (PDF)
115-295	December 6, 2018	(No short title)	To designate the facility of the United States Postal Service located at 530 Claremont Avenue in Ashland, Ohio, as the "Bill Harris Post Office".	Pub. L. 115–295 (text) (PDF)
115-296	December 6, 2018	(No short title)	To designate the facility of the United States Postal Service located at 1355 North Meridian Road in Harristown, Illinois, as the "Logan S. Palmer Post Office".	Pub. L. 115–296 (text) (PDF)
115-297	December 6, 2018	(No short title)	To designate the facility of the United States Postal Service located at 362 North Ross Street in Beaverton, Michigan, as the "Colonel Alfred Asch Post Office".	Pub. L. 115–297 (text) (PDF)
115-298	December 7, 2018	(No short title)	Making further continuing appropriations for fiscal year 2019, and for other purposes.	Pub. L. 115–298 (text) (PDF)
115-299	December 7, 2018	Amy, Vicky, and Andy Child Pornography Victim Assistance Act of 2018	To amend title 18, United States Code, to provide for assistance for victims of child pornography, and for other purposes.	Pub. L. 115–299 (text) (PDF)
115-300	December 11, 2018	Iraq and Syria Genocide Relief and Accountability Act of 2018	To provide relief for victims of genocide, crimes against humanity, and war crimes who are members of religious and ethnic minority groups in Iraq and Syria, for accountability for perpetrators of these crimes, and for other purposes.	Pub. L. 115–300 (text) (PDF)
115-301	December 11, 2018	(No short title)	To repeal the Act entitled "To confer jurisdiction on the State of Iowa over offenses committed by or against Indians on the Sac and Fox Indian Reservation".	Pub. L. 115–301 (text) (PDF)
115-302	December 11, 2018	Action for Dental Health Act of 2018	To amend the Public Health Service Act to improve essential oral health care for low-income and other underserved individuals by breaking down barriers to care, and for other purposes.	Pub. L. 115–302 (text) (PDF)
115-303	December 11, 2018	Women in Aerospace Education Act	To amend the National Science Foundation Authorization Act of 2002 to strengthen the aerospace workforce pipeline by the promotion of Robert Noyce Teacher Scholarship Program and National Aeronautics and Space Administration internship and fellowship opportunities to women, and for other purposes.	Pub. L. 115–303 (text) (PDF)
115-304	December 11, 2018	(No short title)	To repeal section 2141 of the Revised Statutes to remove the prohibition on certain alcohol manufacturing on Indian lands.	Pub. L. 115–304 (text) (PDF)
115-305	December 11, 2018	PEPFAR Extension Act of 2018	To extend certain authorities relating to United States efforts to combat HIV/AIDS, tuberculosis, and malaria globally, and for other purposes.	Pub. L. 115–305 (text) (PDF)
115-306	December 11, 2018	(No short title)	To establish a procedure for the conveyance of certain Federal property around the Dickinson Reservoir in the State of North Dakota.	Pub. L. 115–306 (text) (PDF)
115-307	December 11, 2018	National Earthquake Hazards Reduction Program Reauthorization Act of 2018	To reauthorize and amend the National Earthquake Hazards Reduction Program, and for other purposes.	Pub. L. 115–307 (text) (PDF)
115-308	December 11, 2018	(No short title)	To establish a procedure for the conveyance of certain Federal property around the Jamestown Reservoir in the State of North Dakota.	Pub. L. 115–306 (text) (PDF)
115-309	December 11, 2018	(No short title)	To redesignate a facility of the National Aeronautics and Space Administration.	Pub. L. 115–309 (text) (PDF)
115-310	December 13, 2018	Anwar Sadat Centennial Celebration Act	To award the Congressional Gold Medal to Anwar Sadat in recognition of his heroic achievements and courageous contributions to peace in the Middle East.	Pub. L. 115–310 (text) (PDF)
115-311	December 13, 2018	(No short title)	To designate the facility of the United States Postal Service located at 306 River Street in Tilden, Texas, as the "Tilden Veterans Post Office".	Pub. L. 115–311 (text) (PDF)
115-312	December 13, 2018	(No short title)	To designate the Federal building and United States courthouse located at 200 West 2nd Street in Dayton, Ohio, as the "Walter H. Rice Federal Building and United States Courthouse".	Pub. L. 115–312 (text) (PDF)
115-313	December 13, 2018	(No short title)	To designate the facility of the United States Postal Service located at 20 Ferry Road in Saunderstown, Rhode Island, as the "Captain Matthew J. August Post Office".	Pub. L. 115–313 (text) (PDF)
115-314	December 13, 2018	(No short title)	To designate the facility of the United States Postal Service located at 105 Duff Street in Macon, Missouri, as the "Arla W. Harrell Post Office".	Pub. L. 115–314 (text) (PDF)
115-315	December 13, 2018	(No short title)	To name the Department of Veterans Affairs community-based outpatient clinic in Statesboro, Georgia, the Ray Hendrix Department of Veterans Affairs Clinic.	Pub. L. 115–315 (text) (PDF)
115-316	December 13, 2018	(No short title)	An act to designate the facility of the United States Postal Service located at 3s101 Rockwell Street in Warrenville, Illinois, as the "Corporal Jeffrey Allen Williams Post Office Building".	Pub. L. 115–316 (text) (PDF)
115-317	December 13, 2018	(No short title)	To designate the facility of the United States Postal Service located at 1234 Saint Johns Place in Brooklyn, New York, as the "Major Robert Odell Owens Post Office".	Pub. L. 115–317 (text) (PDF)
115-318	December 13, 2018	(No short title)	To designate the facility of the United States Postal Service located at 413 Washington Avenue in Belleville, New Jersey, as the "Private Henry Svehla Post Office Building".	Pub. L. 115–318 (text) (PDF)
115-319	December 13, 2018	(No short title)	To designate the facility of the United States Postal Service located at 120 12th Street Lobby in Columbus, Georgia, as the "Richard W. Williams, Jr., Chapter of the Triple Nickles (555th P.I.A.) Post Office".	Pub. L. 115–319 (text) (PDF)
115-320	December 17, 2018	Improving Access to Maternity Care Act	To amend the Public Health Service Act to distribute maternity care health professionals to health professional shortage areas identified as in need of maternity care health services.	Pub. L. 115–320 (text) (PDF)
115-321	December 17, 2018	National Law Enforcement Museum Exhibits Act	To amend the National Law Enforcement Museum Act to allow the Museum to acquire, receive, possess, collect, ship, transport, import, and display firearms, and for other purposes.	Pub. L. 115–321 (text) (PDF)
115-322	December 17, 2018	Larry Doby Congressional Gold Medal Act	To award a Congressional Gold Medal in honor of Lawrence Eugene "Larry" Doby in recognition of his achievements and contributions to American major league athletics, civil rights, and the Armed Forces during World War II.	Pub. L. 115–322 (text) (PDF)
115-323	December 17, 2018	REAL ID Act Modification for Freely Associated States Act	To amend the Real ID Act of 2005 to permit Freely Associated States to meet identification requirements under such Act, and for other purposes.	Pub. L. 115–323 (text) (PDF)
115-324	December 17, 2018	Spurring Business in Communities Act of 2018	To amend the Small Business Act to modify the method for prescribing size standards for business concerns.	Pub. L. 115–324 (text) (PDF)
115-325	December 18, 2018	Indian Tribal Energy Development and Self-Determination Act Amendments of 2017	To amend the Indian Tribal Energy Development and Self Determination Act of 2005, and for other purposes.	Pub. L. 115–325 (text) (PDF)
115-326	December 18, 2018	Southeast Alaska Regional Health Consortium Land Transfer Act of 2017	To provide for the conveyance of certain property to the Southeast Alaska Regional Health Consortium located in Sitka, Alaska, and for other purposes.	Pub. L. 115–326 (text) (PDF)
115-327	December 18, 2018	Sickle Cell Disease and Other Heritable Blood Disorders Research, Surveillance, Prevention, and Treatment Act of 2018	To amend the Public Health Service Act to reauthorize a sickle cell disease prevention and treatment demonstration program and to provide for sickle cell disease research, surveillance, prevention, and treatment.	Pub. L. 115–327 (text) (PDF)
115-328	December 18, 2018	PREEMIE Reauthorization Act of 2018	To revise and extend the Prematurity Research Expansion and Education for Mothers who deliver Infants Early Act (PREEMIE Act).	Pub. L. 115–328 (text) (PDF)
115-329	December 18, 2018	Endangered Salmon Predation Prevention Act	To allow for the taking of sea lions on the Columbia River and its tributaries to protect endangered and threatened species of salmon and other nonlisted fish species.	Pub. L. 115–329 (text) (PDF)
115-330	December 19, 2018	Reciprocal Access to Tibet Act of 2018	To promote access for United States diplomats and other officials, journalists, and other citizens to Tibetan areas of the People's Republic of China, and for other purposes.	Pub. L. 115–330 (text) (PDF)
115-331	December 19, 2018	Department of Homeland Security Data Framework Act of 2018	To direct the U.S. Secretary of Homeland Security to establish a data framework to provide access for appropriate personnel to law enforcement and other information of the Department, and for other purposes.	Pub. L. 115–331 (text) (PDF)
115-332	December 19, 2018	Protecting Access to the Courts for Taxpayers Act	To amend title 28, United States Code, to permit other courts to transfer certain cases to United States Tax Court.	Pub. L. 115–332 (text) (PDF)
115-333	December 19, 2018	Spurring Business in Communities Act of 2017	To amend the Small Business Investment Act of 1958 to improve the number of small business investment companies in underlicensed States, and for other purposes.	Pub. L. 115–333 (text) (PDF)
115-334	December 20, 2018	Agriculture Improvement Act of 2018	To provide for the reform and continuation of agricultural and other programs of the U.S. Department of Agriculture through fiscal year 2023, and for other purposes.	Pub. L. 115–334 (text) (PDF)
115-335	December 20, 2018	Nicaraguan Investment Conditionality Act (NICA) of 2017	To oppose loans at international financial institutions for the Government of Nicaragua unless the Government of Nicaragua is taking effective steps to hold free, fair, and transparent elections, and for other purposes.	Pub. L. 115–335 (text) (PDF)
115-336	December 20, 2018	21st Century IDEA	To improve executive agency digital services, and for other purposes.	Pub. L. 115–336 (text) (PDF)
115-337	December 20, 2018	Chinese-American World War II Veteran Congressional Gold Medal Act	To award a Congressional Gold Medal, collectively, to the Chinese-American Veterans of World War II, in recognition of their dedicated service during World War II.	Pub. L. 115–337 (text) (PDF)
115-338	December 20, 2018	USS Indianapolis Congressional Gold Medal Act	To award a Congressional Gold Medal, collectively, to the crew of the USS Indianapolis, in recognition of their perseverance, bravery, and service to the United States.	Pub. L. 115–338 (text) (PDF)
115-339	December 21, 2018	No Hero Left Untreated Act	To direct the Secretary of Veterans Affairs to carry out a pilot program to provide access to magnetic EEG/EKG-guided resonance therapy to veterans.	Pub. L. 115–339 (text) (PDF)
115-340	December 21, 2018	(No short title)	To designate the facility of the United States Postal Service located at 122 W. Goodwin Street, Pleasanton, Texas, as the "Pleasanton Veterans Post Office".	Pub. L. 115–340 (text) (PDF)
115-341	December 21, 2018	(No short title)	To designate the facility of the United States Postal Service located at 400 N. Main Street, Encinal, Texas, as the "Encinal Veterans Post Office".	Pub. L. 115–341 (text) (PDF)
115-342	December 21, 2018	Congenital Heart Futures Reauthorization Act of 2017	To amend the Public Health Service Act to coordinate Federal congenital heart disease research efforts and to improve public education and awareness of congenital heart disease, and for other purposes	Pub. L. 115–342 (text) (PDF)
115-343	December 21, 2018	Naismith Memorial Basketball Hall of Fame Commemorative Coin Act	To require the Secretary of the Treasury to mint coins in recognition of the 60th Anniversary of the Naismith Memorial Basketball Hall of Fame.	Pub. L. 115–343 (text) (PDF)
115-344	December 21, 2018	Preventing Maternal Deaths Act of 2018	To support States in their work to save and sustain the health of mothers during pregnancy, childbirth, and in the postpartum period, to eliminate disparities in maternal health outcomes for pregnancy-related and pregnancy-associated deaths, to identify solutions to improve health care quality and health outcomes for mothers, and for other purposes.	Pub. L. 115–344 (text) (PDF)
115-345	December 21, 2018	(No short title)	To direct the Secretary of Energy to review and update a report on the energy and environmental benefits of the re-refining of used lubricating oil.	Pub. L. 115–345 (text) (PDF)
115-346	December 21, 2018	(No short title)	To designate the facility of the United States Postal Service located at 907 Fourth Avenue in Lake Odessa, Michigan, as the "Donna Sauers Besko Post Office".	Pub. L. 115–346 (text) (PDF)
115-347	December 21, 2018	(No short title)	To designate the facility of the United States Postal Service located at 180 McCormick Road in Charlottesville, Virginia, as the "Captain Humayun Khan Post Office".	Pub. L. 115–347 (text) (PDF)
115-348	December 21, 2018	Sanctioning the Use of Civilians as Defenseless Shields Act	To impose sanctions with respect to foreign persons that are responsible for using civilians as human shields, and for other purposes.	Pub. L. 115–348 (text) (PDF)
115-349	December 21, 2018	(No short title)	To designate the flood control project in Sedgwick County, Kansas, commonly known as the Wichita-Valley Center Flood Control Project, as the "M.S. 'Mitch' Mitchell Floodway".	Pub. L. 115–349 (text) (PDF)
115-350	December 21, 2018	Gila River Indian Community Federal Rights-of-Way, Easements and Boundary Clarification Act	To confirm undocumented Federal rights-of-way or easements on the Gila River Indian Reservation, clarify the northern boundary of the Gila River Indian Community's Reservation, to take certain land located in Maricopa County and Pinal County, Arizona, into trust for the benefit of the Gila River Indian Community, and for other purposes.	Pub. L. 115–350 (text) (PDF)
115-351	December 21, 2018	(No short title)	To designate the facility of the United States Postal Service located at 200 West North Street in Normal, Illinois, as the "Sgt. Josh Rodgers Post Office".	Pub. L. 115–351 (text) (PDF)
115-352	December 21, 2018	Correcting Miscalculations in Veterans' Pensions Act	To amend title 5, United States Code, to provide for interest payments by agencies in the case of administrative error in processing certain annuity deposits for prior military service or certain volunteer service, and for other purposes.	Pub. L. 115–352 (text) (PDF)
115-353	December 21, 2018	Defending Economic Livelihoods and Threatened Animals Act (or DELTA Act)	To promote inclusive economic growth through conservation and biodiversity programs that facilitate transboundary cooperation, improve natural resource management, and build local capacity to protect and preserve threatened wildlife species in the greater Okavango River Basin of southern Africa.	Pub. L. 115–353 (text) (PDF)
115-354	December 21, 2018	(No short title)	To designate the facility of the United States Postal Service located at 701 6th Street in Hawthorne, Nevada, as the "Sergeant Kenneth Eric Bostic Post Office".	Pub. L. 115–354 (text) (PDF)
115-355	December 21, 2018	(No short title)	To designate the facility of the United States Postal Service located at 116 Main Street in Dansville, New York, as the "Staff Sergeant Alexandria Gleason-Morrow Post Office Building".	Pub. L. 115–355 (text) (PDF)
115-356	December 21, 2018	(No short title)	To designate the facility of the United States Postal Service located at 25 2nd Avenue in Brentwood, New York, as the "Army Specialist Jose L. Ruiz Post Office Building".	Pub. L. 115–356 (text) (PDF)
115-357	December 21, 2018	(No short title)	To designate the facility of the United States Postal Service located at 108 North Macon Street in Bevier, Missouri, as the "SO2 Navy SEAL Adam Olin Smith Post Office".	Pub. L. 115–357 (text) (PDF)
115-358	December 21, 2018	Strengthening Coastal Communities Act of 2018	To amend the Coastal Barrier Resources Act to give effect to more accurate maps of units of the John H. Chafee Coastal Barrier Resources System that were produced by digital mapping of such units, and for other purposes.	Pub. L. 115–358 (text) (PDF)
115-359	December 21, 2018	(No short title)	To designate the facility of the United States Postal Service located at 9609 South University Boulevard in Highlands Ranch, Colorado, as the "Deputy Sheriff Zackari Spurlock Parrish, III, Post Office Building".	Pub. L. 115–359 (text) (PDF)
115-360	December 21, 2018	(No short title)	To designate the facility of the United States Postal Service located at 90 North 4th Avenue in Brighton, Colorado, as the "Detective Heath McDonald Gumm Post Office".	Pub. L. 115–360 (text) (PDF)
115-361	December 21, 2018	Walnut Grove Land Exchange Act	To direct the Secretary of Agriculture to exchange certain public lands in Ouachita National Forest, and for other purposes.	Pub. L. 115–361 (text) (PDF)
115-362	December 21, 2018	(No short title)	To designate the facility of the United States Postal Service located at 325 South Michigan Avenue in Howell, Michigan, as the "Sergeant Donald Burgett Post Office Building".	Pub. L. 115–362 (text) (PDF)
115-363	December 21, 2018	(No short title)	To designate the facility of the United States Postal Service located at 51 Willow Street in Lynn, Massachusetts, as the "Thomas P. Costin, Jr. Post Office Building".	Pub. L. 115–363 (text) (PDF)
115-364	December 21, 2018	(No short title)	To amend title 5, United States Code, to clarify the sources of the authority to issue regulations regarding certifications and other criteria applicable to legislative branch employees under Wounded Warriors Federal Leave Act.	Pub. L. 115–364 (text) (PDF)
115-365	December 21, 2018	(No short title)	To designate the facility of the United States Postal Service located at 5707 South Cass Avenue in Westmont, Illinois, as the "James William Robinson Jr. Memorial Post Office Building".	Pub. L. 115–365 (text) (PDF)
115-366	December 21, 2018	(No short title)	To designate the facility of the United States Postal Service located at 3025 Woodgate Road in Montrose, Colorado, as the "Sergeant David Kinterknecht Post Office".	Pub. L. 115–366 (text) (PDF)
115-367	December 21, 2018	(No short title)	To designate the facility of the United States Postal Service located at 241 N 4th Street in Grand Junction, Colorado, as the "Deputy Sheriff Derek Geer Post Office Building".	Pub. L. 115–367 (text) (PDF)
115-368	December 21, 2018	National Quantum Initiative Act	To provide for a coordinated Federal program to accelerate quantum research and development for the economic and national security of the United States.	Pub. L. 115–368 (text) (PDF)
115-369	December 21, 2018	(No short title)	To designate the facility of the United States Postal Service located at 322 Main Street in Oakville, Connecticut, as the "Oakville Veterans Memorial Post Office".	Pub. L. 115–369 (text) (PDF)
115-370	December 21, 2018	7(a) Real Estate Appraisal Harmonization Act	To adjust the real estate appraisal thresholds under the 7(a) program to bring them into line with the thresholds used by the Federal banking regulators, and for other purposes.	Pub. L. 115–370 (text) (PDF)
115-371	December 21, 2018	Small Business Access to Capital and Efficiency Act (or Small Business ACE Act)	To adjust the real estate appraisal thresholds under the section 504 program to bring them into line with the thresholds used by the Federal banking regulators, and for other purposes.	Pub. L. 115–371 (text) (PDF)
115-372	December 21, 2018	United States Ports of Entry Threat and Operational Review Act	To require the Secretary of Homeland Security to conduct a threat and operational analysis of ports of entry, and for other purposes.	Pub. L. 115–372 (text) (PDF)
115-373	December 21, 2018	(No short title)	To designate the facility of the United States Postal Service located at 2801 Mitchell Road in Ceres, California, as the "Lance Corporal Juana Navarro Arellano Post Office Building".	Pub. L. 115–373 (text) (PDF)
115-374	December 21, 2018	Frank Leone Post Office Act	To designate the facility of the United States Postal Service located at 332 Ramapo Valley Road in Oakland, New Jersey, as the "Frank Leone Post Office".	Pub. L. 115–374 (text) (PDF)
115-375	December 21, 2018	(No short title)	To designate the facility of the United States Postal Service located at 1110 West Market Street in Athens, Alabama, as the "Judge James E. Horton, Jr. Post Office Building".	Pub. L. 115–375 (text) (PDF)
115-376	December 21, 2018	(No short title)	To designate the facility of the United States Postal Service located at 501 South Kirkman Road in Orlando, Florida, as the "Napoleon 'Nap' Ford Post Office Building".	Pub. L. 115–376 (text) (PDF)
115-377	December 21, 2018	Traumatic Brain Injury Program Reauthorization Act of 2018	To reauthorize the Traumatic Brain Injury program.	Pub. L. 115–377 (text) (PDF)
115-378	December 21, 2018	(No short title)	To designate the facility of the United States Postal Service located at 530 East Main Street in Johnson City, Tennessee, as the "Major Homer L. Pease Post Office".	Pub. L. 115–378 (text) (PDF)
115-379	December 21, 2018	(No short title)	To designate the facility of the United States Postal Service located at 4301 Northeast 4th Street in Renton, Washington, as the "James Marshall 'Jimi' Hendrix Post Office Building".	Pub. L. 115–379 (text) (PDF)
115-380	December 21, 2018	(No short title)	To designate the facility of the United States Postal Service located at 44160 State Highway 299 East Suite 1 in McArthur, California, as the "Janet Lucille Oilar Post Office".	Pub. L. 115–380 (text) (PDF)
115-381	December 21, 2018	(No short title)	To designate the facility of the United States Postal Service located at 7521 Paula Drive in Tampa, Florida, as the "Major Andreas O'Keeffe Post Office Building".	Pub. L. 115–381 (text) (PDF)
115-382	December 21, 2018	(No short title)	To designate the facility of the United States Postal Service located at 35 West Main Street in Frisco, Colorado, as the "Patrick E. Mahany, Jr., Post Office Building".	Pub. L. 115–382 (text) (PDF)
115-383	December 21, 2018	Secret Service Overtime Pay Extension Act	To amend the Overtime Pay for Protective Services Act of 2016 to extend the Secret Service overtime pay exception through 2020, and for other purposes.	Pub. L. 115–383 (text) (PDF)
115-384	December 21, 2018	(No short title)	To designate the facility of the United States Postal Service located at 10 Miller Street in Plattsburgh, New York, as the "Ross Bouyea Post Office Building".	Pub. L. 115–384 (text) (PDF)
115-385	December 21, 2018	Juvenile Justice Reform Act of 2018	To reauthorize and improve the Juvenile Justice and Delinquency Prevention Act of 1974, and for other purposes.	Pub. L. 115–385 (text) (PDF)
115-386	December 21, 2018	(No short title)	To amend the Federal Election Campaign Act of 1971 to extend through 2023 the authority of the Federal Election Commission to impose civil money penalties on the basis of a schedule of penalties established and published by the Commission.	Pub. L. 115–386 (text) (PDF)
115-387	December 21, 2018	Countering Weapons of Mass Destruction Act of 2018	To amend the Homeland Security Act of 2002 to establish the Countering Weapons of Mass Destruction Office, and for other purposes.	Pub. L. 115–387 (text) (PDF)
115-388	December 21, 2018	(No short title)	To designate the facility of the United States Postal Service located at 226 West Main Street in Lake City, South Carolina, as the "Postmaster Frazier B. Baker Post Office".	Pub. L. 115–388 (text) (PDF)
115-389	December 21, 2018	(No short title)	To amend Public Law 115-217 to change the address of the postal facility designated by such Public Law in honor of Sergeant First Class Alwyn Crendall Cashe, and for other purposes.	Pub. L. 115–389 (text) (PDF)
115-390	December 21, 2018	Strengthening and Enhancing Cyber-capabilities by Utilizing Risk Exposure Technology Act (or SECURE Technology Act)	To require the Secretary of Homeland Security to establish a security vulnerability disclosure policy, to establish a bug bounty program for the Department of Homeland Security, to amend title 41, United States Code, to provide for Federal acquisition supply chain security, and for other purposes.	Pub. L. 115–390 (text) (PDF)
115-391	December 21, 2018	First Step Act of 2018	To reauthorize and amend the Marine Debris Act to promote international action to reduce marine debris, and for other purposes.	Pub. L. 115–391 (text) (PDF)
115-392	December 21, 2018	Abolish Human Trafficking Act of 2017	To provide assistance in abolishing human trafficking in the United States.	Pub. L. 115–392 (text) (PDF)
115-393	December 21, 2018	Trafficking Victims Protection Act of 2017	To prioritize the fight against human trafficking in the United States.	Pub. L. 115–393 (text) (PDF)
115-394	December 21, 2018	Commercial Engagement Through Ocean Technology Act of 2018 (or CENOTE Act of 2018)	To require the Under Secretary of Commerce for Oceans and Atmosphere to carry out a program on coordinating the assessment and acquisition by the National Oceanic and Atmospheric Administration of unmanned maritime systems, to make available to the public data collected by the Administration using such systems, and for other purposes.	Pub. L. 115–394 (text) (PDF)
115-395	December 21, 2018	CyberTipline Modernization Act of 2018	To amend title 18, United States Code, to make certain changes to the reporting requirement of certain service providers regarding child sexual exploitation visual depictions, and for other purposes.	Pub. L. 115–395 (text) (PDF)
115-396	December 21, 2018	National Flood Insurance Program Extension Act	To reauthorize the National Flood Insurance Program.	Pub. L. 115–396 (text) (PDF)
115-397	December 21, 2018	Congressional Accountability Act of 1995 Reform Act	To amend the Congressional Accountability Act of 1995 to reform the procedures provided under such Act for the initiation, investigation, and resolution of claims alleging that employing offices of the legislative branch have violated the rights and protections provided to their employees under such Act, including protections against sexual harassment, and for other purposes.	Pub. L. 115–397 (text) (PDF)
115-398	December 31, 2018	SOAR to Health and Wellness Act of 2018	To establish the Stop, Observe, Ask, and Respond to Health and Wellness Training pilot program to address human trafficking in the health care system.	Pub. L. 115–398 (text) (PDF)
115-399	December 31, 2018	Stigler Act Amendments of 2018	To amend the Act of August 4, 1947 (commonly known as the Stigler Act), with respect to restrictions applicable to Indians of the Five Civilized Tribes of Oklahoma, and for other purposes.	Pub. L. 115–399 (text) (PDF)
115-400	December 31, 2018	Vehicular Terrorism Prevention Act of 2018	To require the Secretary of Homeland Security to examine what actions the Department of Homeland Security is undertaking to combat the threat of vehicular terrorism, and for other purposes.	Pub. L. 115–400 (text) (PDF)
115-401	December 31, 2018	Ashanti Alert Act of 2018	To encourage, enhance, and integrate Ashanti Alert plans throughout the United States, and for other purposes	Pub. L. 115–401 (text) (PDF)
115-402	December 31, 2018	Innovations in Mentoring, Training, and Apprenticeships Act	To direct the National Science Foundation to provide grants for research about STEM education approaches and the STEM-related workforce, and for other purposes.	Pub. L. 115–402 (text) (PDF)
115-403	December 31, 2018	NASA Enhanced Use Leasing Extension Act of 2018	To amend title 51, United States Code, to extend the authority of the National Aeronautics and Space Administration to enter into leases of non-excess property of the Administration.	Pub. L. 115–403 (text) (PDF)
115-404	December 31, 2018	Johnson-O'Malley Supplemental Indian Education Program Modernization Act	To direct the Secretary of the Interior to conduct an accurate comprehensive student count for the purposes of calculating formula allocations for programs under the Johnson–O'Malley Act, and for other purposes.	Pub. L. 115–404 (text) (PDF)
115-405	December 31, 2018	Modernizing Recreational Fisheries Management Act of 2018	To expand recreational fishing opportunities through enhanced marine fishery conservation and management, and for other purposes.	Pub. L. 115–405 (text) (PDF)
115-406	December 31, 2018	BOLD Infrastructure for Alzheimer's Act	To amend the Public Health Service Act to authorize the expansion of activities related to Alzheimer's disease, cognitive decline, and brain health under the Alzheimer's Disease and Healthy Aging Program, and for other purposes.	Pub. L. 115–406 (text) (PDF)
115-407	December 31, 2018	Veterans Benefits and Transition Act of 2018	To amend title 38, United States Code, to authorize the Secretary of Veterans Affairs to provide certain burial benefits for spouses and children of veterans who are buried in tribal cemeteries, and for other purposes.	Pub. L. 115–407 (text) (PDF)
115-408	December 31, 2018	State Offices of Rural Health Reauthorization Act of 2018	To amend the Public Health Service Act to provide grants to improve health care in rural areas.	Pub. L. 115–408 (text) (PDF)
115-409	December 31, 2018	Asia Reassurance Initiative Act of 2018	To develop a long-term strategic vision and a comprehensive, multifaceted, and principled United States policy for the Indo-Pacific region, and for other purposes.	Pub. L. 115–409 (text) (PDF)
115-410	December 31, 2018	Museum and Library Services Act of 2018	To reauthorize the Museum and Library Services Act.	Pub. L. 115–410 (text) (PDF)
115-411	January 3, 2019	Global Health Innovation Act of 2017	To direct the Administrator of the United States Agency for International Development to submit to Congress a report on the development and use of global health innovations in the programs, projects, and activities of the Agency.	Pub. L. 115–411 (text) (PDF)
115-412	January 3, 2019	(No short title)	To designate the United States courthouse located at 323 East Chapel Hill Street in Durham, North Carolina, as the "John Hervey Wheeler United States Courthouse".	Pub. L. 115–412 (text) (PDF)
115-413	January 3, 2019	9/11 Memorial Act	To provide competitive grants for the operation, security, and maintenance of certain memorials to victims of the terrorist attacks of September 11, 2001.	Pub. L. 115–413 (text) (PDF)
115-414	January 3, 2019	Good Accounting Obligation in Government Act	To require agencies to submit reports on outstanding recommendations in the annual budget justification submitted to Congress.	Pub. L. 115–414 (text) (PDF)
115-415	January 3, 2019	Stephen Michael Gleason Congressional Gold Medal Act	To award a Congressional Gold Medal to Stephen Michael Gleason.	Pub. L. 115–415 (text) (PDF)
115-416	January 3, 2019	Veterans Small Business Enhancement Act of 2018	To provide access to and manage the distribution of excess or surplus property to veteran-owned small businesses.	Pub. L. 115–416 (text) (PDF)
115-417	January 3, 2019	RBIC Advisers Relief Act of 2018	To amend the Investment Advisers Act of 1940 to exempt investment advisers who solely advise certain rural business investment companies, and for other purposes.	Pub. L. 115–417 (text) (PDF)
115-418	January 3, 2019	Justice Against Corruption on K Street Act of 2018	To require disclosure by lobbyists of convictions for bribery, extortion, embezzlement, illegal kickbacks, tax evasion, fraud, conflicts of interest, making false statements, perjury, or money laundering.	Pub. L. 115–418 (text) (PDF)
115-419	January 3, 2019	Federal Personal Property Management Act of 2018	To amend chapter 5 of title 40, United States Code, to improve the management of Federal personal property.	Pub. L. 115–419 (text) (PDF)
115-420	January 3, 2019	Department of Transportation Reports Harmonization Act	To amend certain transportation-related reporting requirements to improve congressional oversight, reduce reporting burdens, and promote transparency, and for other purposes.	Pub. L. 115–420 (text) (PDF)
115-421	January 3, 2019	(No short title)	To designate the community-based outpatient clinic of the Department of Veterans Affairs in Lake Charles, Louisiana, as the "Douglas Fournet Department of Veterans Affairs Clinic".	Pub. L. 115–421 (text) (PDF)
115-422	January 3, 2019	Forever GI Bill Housing Payment Fulfillment Act of 2018	To require the Secretary of Veterans Affairs to establish a tiger team dedicated to addressing the difficulties encountered by the Department of Veterans Affairs in carrying out section 3313 of title 38, United States Code, after the enactment of sections 107 and 501 of the Harry W. Colmery Veterans Educational Assistance Act of 2017.	Pub. L. 115–422 (text) (PDF)
115-423	January 7, 2019	National Integrated Drought Information System Reauthorization Act of 2018	To reauthorize the National Integrated Drought Information System, and for other purposes.	Pub. L. 115–423 (text) (PDF)
115-424	January 7, 2019	Victims of Child Abuse Act Reauthorization Act of 2018	To reauthorize subtitle A of the Victims of Child Abuse Act of 1990.	Pub. L. 115–424 (text) (PDF)
115-425	January 8, 2019	Frederick Douglass Trafficking Victims Prevention and Protection Reauthorization Act of 2018	To reauthorize the Trafficking Victims Protection Act of 2000, and for other purposes.	Pub. L. 115–425 (text) (PDF)
115-426	January 8, 2019	Civil Rights Cold Case Records Collection Act of 2018	To provide for the expeditious disclosure of records related to civil rights cold cases, and for other purposes.	Pub. L. 115–426 (text) (PDF)
115-427	January 9, 2019	Trafficking Victims Protection Reauthorization Act of 2017	To amend the Trafficking Victims Protection Act of 2000 to modify the criteria for determining whether countries are meeting the minimum standards for the elimination of human trafficking, and for other purposes	Pub. L. 115–427 (text) (PDF)
115-428	January 9, 2019	Women's Entrepreneurship and Economic Empowerment Act of 2018	To improve programs and activities relating to women's entrepreneurship and economic empowerment that are carried out by the United States Agency for International Development, and for other purposes.	Pub. L. 115–428 (text) (PDF)
115-429	January 10, 2019	(No short title)	To authorize early repayment of obligations to the Bureau of Reclamation within the Northport Irrigation District in the State of Nebraska.	Pub. L. 115–429 (text) (PDF)
115-430	January 10, 2019	Flatside Wilderness Enhancement Act	To designate additions to the Flatside Wilderness on the Ouachita National Forest, and for other purposes.	Pub. L. 115–430 (text) (PDF)
115-431	January 10, 2019	(No short title)	To reauthorize the New Jersey Coastal Heritage Trail Route, and for other purposes.	Pub. L. 115–431 (text) (PDF)
115-432	January 10, 2019	(No short title)	To redesignate Hobe Sound National Wildlife Refuge as the Nathaniel P. Reed Hobe Sound National Wildlife Refuge, and for other purposes.	Pub. L. 115–432 (text) (PDF)
115-433	January 10, 2019	75th Anniversary of World War II Commemoration Act	To provide for a program of the Department of Defense to commemorate the 75th anniversary of World War II.	Pub. L. 115–433 (text) (PDF)
115-434	January 14, 2019	Combating European Anti-Semitism Act of 2017	To require continued and enhanced annual reporting to Congress in the Annual Report on International Religious Freedom on anti-Semitic incidents in Europe, the safety and security of European Jewish communities, and the efforts of the United States to partner with European governments, the European Union, and civil society groups, to combat anti-Semitism, and for other purposes.	Pub. L. 115–434 (text) (PDF)
115-435	January 14, 2019	Foundations for Evidence-Based Policymaking Act of 2018	To amend titles 5 and 44, United States Code, to require Federal evaluation activities, improve Federal data management, and for other purposes.	Pub. L. 115–435 (text) (PDF)
115-436	January 14, 2019	Water Infrastructure Improvement Act	To amend the Federal Water Pollution Control Act to provide for an integrated planning process, to promote green infrastructure, and for other purposes.	Pub. L. 115–436 (text) (PDF)
115-437	January 14, 2019	(No short title)	To amend the Federal Assets Sale and Transfer Act of 2016 to ensure that the Public Buildings Reform Board has adequate time to carry out the responsibilities of the Board, and for other purposes.	Pub. L. 115–437 (text) (PDF)
115-438	January 14, 2019	(No short title)	To amend the Federal Assets Sale and Transfer Act of 2016 to provide flexibility with respect to the leaseback of certain Federal real property, and for other purposes.	Pub. L. 115–438 (text) (PDF)
115-439	January 14, 2019	Nuclear Energy Innovation and Modernization Act	To modernize the regulation of nuclear energy.	Pub. L. 115–439 (text) (PDF)
115-440	January 14, 2019	Tropical Forest Conservation Reauthorization Act of 2018	To reauthorize the Tropical Forest Conservation Act of 1998 through fiscal year 2021, and for other purposes.	Pub. L. 115–440 (text) (PDF)
115-441	January 14, 2019	Elie Wiesel Genocide and Atrocities Prevention Act of 2018	To help prevent acts of genocide and other atrocity crimes, which threaten national and international security, by enhancing United States Government capacities to prevent, mitigate, and respond to such crises.	Pub. L. 115–441 (text) (PDF)
115-442	January 14, 2019	Protecting Girls' Access to Education in Vulnerable Settings Act	To enhance the transparency, improve the coordination, and intensify the impact of assistance to support access to primary and secondary education for displaced children and persons, including women and girls, and for other purposes.	Pub. L. 115–442 (text) (PDF)

== Private laws ==
Private law number (Linked to Wikisource)	Date of enactment	Official title	Link to Legislink.org
115-1	January 29, 2018	To authorize the President to award the Medal of Honor to John L. Canley for acts of valor during the Vietnam War while a member of the Marine Corps.	Priv.L. 115-1

== Treaties ==
Treaty number	Date of Ratification	Short title	Description
Treaty 114-12	March 28, 2017	Protocol to the North Atlantic Treaty of 1949 on the Accession of Montenegro	Provides for the Accession of Montenegro to NATO
Treaty 114-6	June 28, 2018	Marrakesh Treaty to Facilitate Access to Published Works for Persons Who Are Blind, Visually Impaired, or Otherwise Print Disabled	To allow for copyright exceptions for the creation of accessible versions books and other copyrighted works for visually impaired persons
Treaty 115-1	July 26, 2018	Extradition Treaty with the Republic of Serbia	To replace the previous extradition treaty signed between the United States and the Kingdom of Serbia, a predecessor state to the Republic of Serbia, in 1901
Treaty 115-2	July 26, 2018	Extradition Treaty with the Republic of Kosovo	To replace the previous extradition treaty signed between the United States and the Kingdom of Serbia, a predecessor state to the Republic of Kosovo, in 1901
Treaty 114-13(A)	July 26, 2018	The Treaty with the Federated States of Micronesia on the Delimitation of a Maritime Boundary	To establish maritime boundaries between unorganized territories of the United States in the Pacific Ocean and the Federated States of Micronesia
Treaty 114-13(B)	July 26, 2018	The Treaty with the Republic of Kiribati on the Delimitation of a Maritime Boundary	To establish maritime boundaries between unorganized territories of the United States in the Pacific Ocean and the Republic of Kiribati

== See also ==
- List of bills in the 115th United States Congress
- List of United States presidential vetoes § Donald Trump
- List of United States federal legislation
- List of acts of the 114th United States Congress
- Lists of acts of the United States Congress
