= Weather Research and Forecasting Innovation Act of 2017 =

- Long title: To improve the National Oceanic and Atmospheric Administration's weather research through a focused program of investment on affordable and attainable advances in observational, computing, and modeling capabilities to support substantial improvement in weather forecasting and prediction of high impact weather events, to expand commercial opportunities for the provision of weather data, and for other purposes.
- Announced in: the 115th United States Congress
- Sponsored by: Frank Lucas (R-OK)
- Number of co-sponsors: 6

Citations
- Public law: Pub. L. 115–25 (text) (PDF)

Legislative history
- Introduced in the House as H.R. 353 by Frank Lucas (R-OK) on January 6, 2017; Committee consideration by United States House Committee on Science, Space, and Technology; Passed the House on January 9, 2017 (voice vote); Passed the Senate on March 29, 2017 (voice vote); Signed into law by President Donald Trump on April 18, 2017

The Weather Research and Forecasting Innovation Act of 2017 (Pub. L. 115–25 (text) (PDF), H.R. 353) is a law providing for weather research and forecasting improvement, weather satellite and data innovation, and federal weather coordination.

The bill was introduced into the United States House of Representatives during the 115th United States Congress. It was signed into law by President Donald Trump on April 18, 2017.

== Provisions of the bill ==
=== Title I - United States Weather Research and Forecasting Improvement ===
Sec. 101 - The National Oceanic and Atmospheric Administration (NOAA) must prioritize weather research to improve weather data, modeling, computing, and forecasting, and warnings to protect life and property.

Sec. 102 - NOAA's Office of Oceanic and Atmospheric Research (OAR) must conduct a program to improve understanding of forecasting capabilities and impacts of atmospheric events. In carrying out the program, the OAR must provide competitive grants, contracts, and agreements to support the nonfederal weather research community.

Sec. 103 - The NOAA must establish a tornado warning improvement and extension program and develop better forecasts, predictions, and warnings.

Sec. 104 - Through the National Weather Service (NWS), the NOAA must maintain a project to improve hurricane forecasting. The program must advance the prediction of rapid intensification and track of hurricanes, the forecast and communication of storm surges from hurricanes, and risk communication research to create more effective watch and warning products.

Sec. 105 - The OAR must issue a research/development operations plan to restore and maintain U.S. leadership in numerical weather prediction and forecasting.

Sec. 106 - The NOAA must prioritize observation data requirements key to ensuring weather forecasting capabilities, evaluating data and information to meet those requirements, identify data gaps, and determine options to address those gaps.

Sec. 107 - The OAR must launch the Observing System Simulation Experiments (OSSE). OSSEs must be conducted before acquisition of any government-owned or government-leased observing systems costing more than $500 million and before buying any new commercially provided data costing over $500 million.

Sec. 108 - The NOAA must provide an annual report on computing priorities and upgrades that relate to weather prediction.

Sec. 109 - The U.S. Weather Research Program must report annually to Congress about on-going research projects related to observations, weather, or subseasonal forecasts closest to operationalization, establish teams with staff from the OAR and the NWS to oversee the research projects, develop mechanisms for research priorities, develop a system to track research goals, provide testing facilities, and facilitate visiting scholars.

Sec. 110 - OAR's weather laboratories, cooperative institutes, and weather and air chemistry research programs and joint technology transfer initiative are authorized through Fiscal Year 2018.

=== Title II - Subseasonal and Seasonal Forecasting Innovation ===
Sec. 201 - The NWS must collect and utilize information to make reliable forecasts of subseasonal and seasonal temperatures and precipitation.

=== Title III - Weather Satellite and Data Innovation ===
Sec. 301 - The NOAA must complete and operationalize the Constellation Observing System for Meteorology, Ionosphere, and Climate.

Sec. 302 - The federal government can purchase weather data through contracts with commercial providers.

Sec. 303 - The NOAA must avoid unnecessary duplication between public and private sources of data.

=== Title IV - Federal Weather Coordination ===
Sec. 401 - The NOAA Science Advisory Board must maintain the Environmental Information Services Working Group.

== Procedural history ==
The Weather Research and Forecasting Innovation Act of 2017 was introduced into the United States House of Representatives on January 6, 2017. The bill was referred to the United States House Committee on Science, Space, and Technology. It was passed without any amendments by voice vote on January 10, 2017. The bill was received in the United States Senate on January 10, 2017. Two amendments to the bill were passed, prior to the Senate passing the bill through unanimous consent. On April 24, 2017, the United States House of Representatives passed the Senate amendments by voice vote. The bill was signed into law by President Donald Trump on April 18, 2017, and became Public Law No: 115-25.

== See also ==
- List of bills in the 115th United States Congress
- List of acts of the 115th United States Congress
