= Vietnam War Veterans Recognition Act of 2017 =

- Long title: A bill to amend title 4, United States Code, to encourage the display of the flag of the United States on National Vietnam War Veterans Day.
- Enacted by: the 115th United States Congress
- Effective: March 28, 2017
- Sponsored by: Sen. Pat Toomey (R-PA)
- Number of co-sponsors: 1

Citations
- Public law: Pub. L. 115–15 (text) (PDF)
- Statutes at Large: 131 Stat. 79

Codification
- Titles affected: Title 4 of the United States Code
- U.S.C. sections affected: 4 U.S.C. § 6

Legislative history
- Introduced in the Senate as S. 305 by Sen. Pat Toomey (R-PA) on February 3, 2017; Passed the Senate on February 3, 2017 (unanimous consent); Passed the House on March 21, 2017 (voice vote); Signed into law by President Donald Trump on March 28, 2017

The Vietnam War Veterans Recognition Act of 2017 (Pub. L. 115–15 (text) (PDF)) is a law that states that the flag of the United States be displayed "especially on Vietnam War Veterans Day."

The bill was introduced into the United States Senate during the 115th United States Congress. It was signed into law by President Donald Trump on March 28, 2017.

== Provisions of the bill ==
The Vietnam War Veterans Recognition Act of 2017 amends title 4 of the United States Code, section 6(d) to include National Vietnam War Veterans Day as an important occasion on which the flag should be raised.

== Procedural history ==
The Vietnam War Veterans Recognition Act of 2017 was introduced into the United States Senate on February 3, 2017. It was passed by unanimous consent the same day without any amendments. The bill was received in the United States House of Representatives and referred to the United States House Committee on the Judiciary and United States House Judiciary Subcommittee on the Constitution and Civil Justice on February 6, 2017. The bill was passed by the House on March 21, 2017 in a voice vote without any amendments. The bill was signed into law by President Donald Trump on March 28, 2017 and became Public Law No: 115-15.

== See also ==
- List of bills in the 115th United States Congress
- List of acts of the 115th United States Congress
