= GAO Access and Oversight Act of 2017 =

2017 U.S. Congressional act

- Long title: An act to ensure the Government Accountability Office has adequate access to information.
- Enacted by: the 115th United States Congress
- Effective: January 31, 2017

Citations
- Public law: Pub. L. 115–3 (text) (PDF)

Legislative history
- Introduced in the House as H.R.72 by Buddy Carter (R–GA) on January 3, 2017; Committee consideration by House Oversight and Government Reform; Passed the House on January 4, 2017 (voice vote); Passed the Senate on January 17, 2017 (99–0); Signed into law by President Donald Trump on January 31, 2017

The GAO Access and Oversight Act of 2017 (Pub. L. 115–3 (text) (PDF),H.R. 72) was one of the first Acts of the 115th United States Congress to be signed into law by President Donald Trump during the first 100 days of his presidency. It was introduced in the United States House of Representatives on January 3, 2017, by Representative Buddy Carter of Georgia. The bill, which was signed by Trump on January 31, 2017, ensures that the Government Accountability Office (GAO) has full access to the National Directory of New Hires, a database created by Congress in 1996 to audit recent job hires mainly to assist agencies at the state level with child support enforcement. According to Congress, 115-3 will enable the GAO to ensure that recipients of federal means-tested programs like Unemployment Insurance, Supplemental Nutrition Assistance Program (SNAP), Earned income tax credit (EITC), and Temporary Assistance for Needy Families (TANF) are eligible.

The bill passed the House on January 4, 2017. It was then considered in the United States Senate Committee on Homeland Security and Governmental Affairs before being passed in the Senate on January 17, 2017.
