= National Vietnam War Veterans Day =

US federal observance

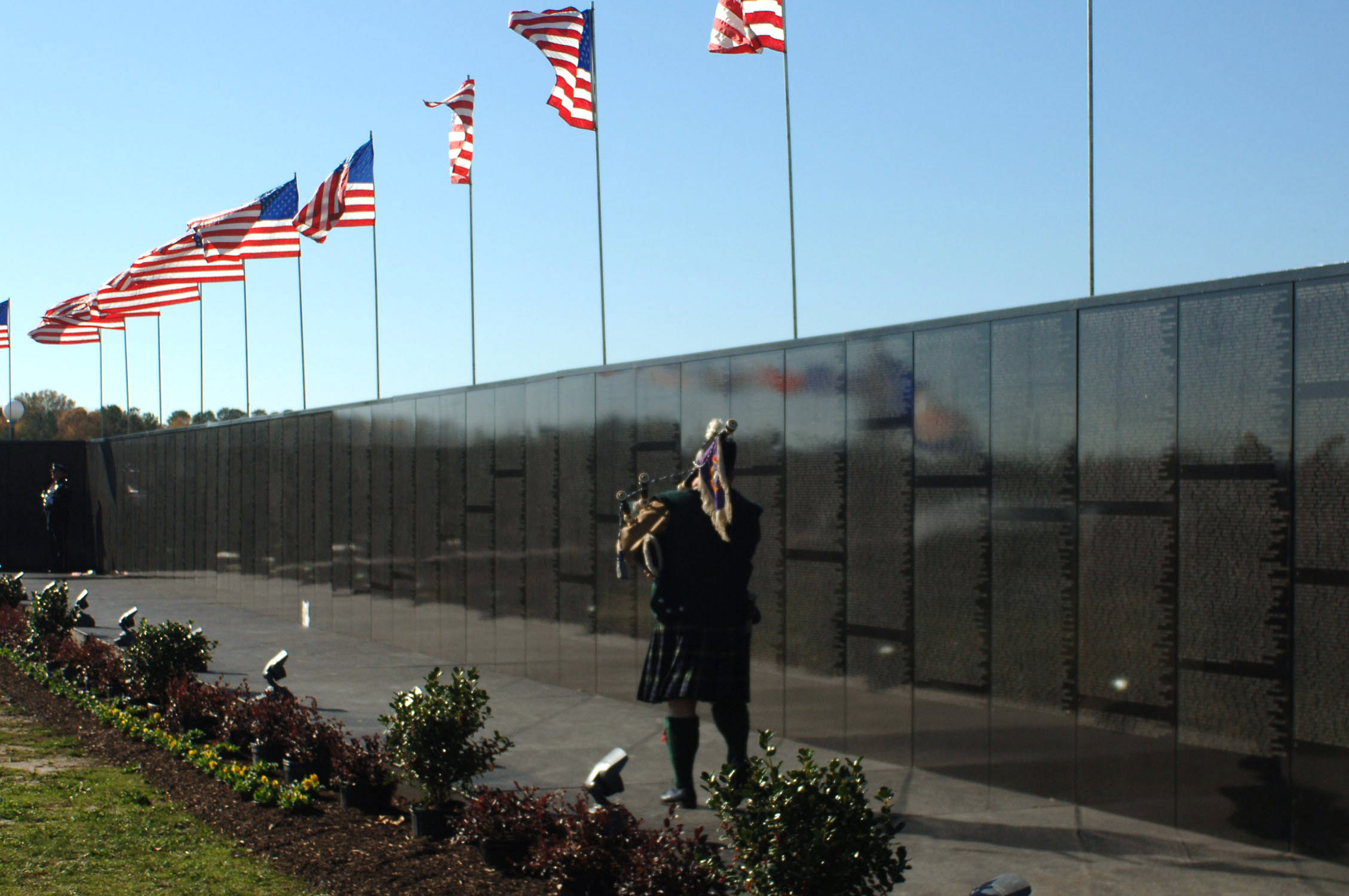
The Vietnam Veterans Memorial in Washington, D.C.

National Vietnam War Veterans Day is observed annually on March 29 in the United States. It is a national observance that recognizes veterans who served in the US military during the Vietnam War.

== History ==
March 29 was chosen as National Vietnam War Veterans Day because on March 29, 1973, Military Assistance Command, Vietnam (MACV) was disbanded and the last U.S. combat troops departed the Republic of Vietnam. The last unit was elements of MACV's Infantry Security Force (Special Guard), actually special couriers.

On March 29, 2012, President Barack Obama proclaimed March 29, 2012, as Vietnam Veterans Day. The proclamation called "upon all Americans to observe this day with appropriate programs, ceremonies, and activities that commemorate the 50 year anniversary of the Vietnam War."

On December 26, 2016, the Vietnam Veterans Day Coalition of States Council presented a letter to President Elect Donald Trump and Congressional leadership outlining the history and timeline of cause to establish March 29 as Vietnam War Veterans Day and requesting that it be one of the first legislations passed and signed into law during the 115 Congress.

On March 28, 2017, President Trump signed the Vietnam War Veterans Recognition Act of 2017. This act officially recognizes March 29 as National Vietnam War Veterans Day. The Act also includes the day among those days on which the US flag should especially be displayed.
