= Claims Resolution Act of 2010 =

United States Law

Claims Resolution Act
- Enacted by: the 111th United States Congress

Citations
- Public law: Pub. L. 111–291 (text) (PDF)

Legislative history
- Introduced in the House as H.R. 4783 by Sander Levin (D–MI) on March 9, 2010; Committee consideration by United States Senate Committee on Finance; Passed the Senate on November 19, 2010 (Unanimous voice vote); Passed the House on November 30, 2010 (256-152); Signed into law by President Barack Obama on December 8, 2010

The Claims Resolution Act of 2010 is a federal law enacted by the 111th Congress and signed into law by President Barack Obama on December 8, 2010. The act is a response to the Pigford v. Glickman case, where black farmers were found to have been discriminated against from 1983 to 1997 by the United States Department of Agriculture when applying for loans and assistance to start and to maintain farms. The case required a $50,000 settlement to every discriminated farmer. However, many potential victims missed the application deadline for a settlement. The bill sets aside $1.5 billion for the estimated 75,000 farmers who are eligible for a settlement.

The bill also includes the settlement of the $3.4 billion Cobell v. Salazar trust fund lawsuit brought forth by Native American representatives against the United States government citing that the U.S. government incorrectly accounted for Indian trust assets.

In the Senate amendments to the bill (H.R. 4783) "to accelerate the income tax benefits for charitable cash contributions for the relief of victims of the earthquake in Chile, and to extend the period from which such contributions for the relief of victims of the earthquake in Haiti may be accelerated." was added.

The final version of the bill was passed by the US Senate by a unanimous voice vote on November 19, 2010, and then approved by the US House of Representatives by a vote of 256 to 152 on November 30. It was signed into law by President Obama on December 8, 2010.
