= SUPPORT for Patients and Communities Act =

United States Law

- Long title: To provide for opioid use disorder prevention, recovery, and treatment, and for other purposes.
- Enacted by: the 115th United States Congress

Citations
- Public law: Pub. L. 115–271 (text) (PDF)

Legislative history
- Introduced in the House of Representatives as H.R. 6 on June 13, 2018; Passed the U.S. House of Representatives on June 22, 2018 (396–14); Passed the U.S. Senate with amendments on October 3, 2018 (98–1); Signed into law by President Donald Trump on October 24, 2018

SUPPORT for Patients and Communities Act, also known as Substance Use–Disorder Prevention that Promotes Opioid Recovery and Treatment for Patients and Communities Act, (H.R. 6, Pub. L. 115–271 (text) (PDF)) is a United States federal law, enacted during the 115th United States Congress, to make medical treatment for opioid addiction more widely available while also cracking down on illicit drugs. This piece of legislation is part of the ongoing conflict to stop and prevent the opioid epidemic in the United States. President Trump signed the bill on October 24, 2018.

President Donald Trump called it the “single largest bill to combat the drug crisis in the history of our country.”

== Provisions and Short Titles ==
=== Eliminating Kickbacks in Recovery Act of 2018 (EKRA) ===
The provision was originally sponsored by senators Marco Rubio and Amy Klobuchar. EKRA targets patient brokers who recruit patients, shopping them to the provider offering the highest kickbacks.

EKRA is codified at 18 U.S.C. § 220. It generally prohibits anyone from paying, receiving, or soliciting, any remuneration in return for referrals to recovery homes, clinical treatment facilities, or laboratories. In this respect, EKRA operates much like the Anti-Kickback Statute, 42 U.S.C. 1320a-7b(b), but focused on substance about recovery. Notably, EKRA prohibits paying for any referrals to clinical laboratories whether or not they perform substance abuse testing.

Like the Anti-Kickback Statute, EKRA contains a number of safe-harbor relationships that do not trigger the statute's prohibition.

In January 2020, the Department of Justice announced what is believed to be its first conviction under EKRA. The target of the prosecution was an office manager of a substance abuse treatment clinic in Kentucky, who admitted to soliciting kickbacks from the CEO of a urine drug testing lab in exchange for the clinic's business.

=== Short Titles ===
- Abuse Deterrent Access Act of 2018
- Access to Increased Drug Disposal Act of 2018
- Advancing High Quality Treatment for Opioid Use Disorders in Medicare Act
- CHIP Mental Health and Substance Use Disorder Parity Act
- COACH Act of 2018
- Combating Opioid Abuse for Care in Hospitals Act of 2018
- Dr. Todd Graham Pain Management, Treatment, and Recovery Act of 2018
- Empowering Pharmacists in the Fight Against Opioid Abuse Act
- Expanding Oversight of Opioid Prescribing and Payment Act of 2018
- Fighting Opioid Abuse in Transportation Act
- IMD CARE Act
- Individuals in Medicaid Deserve Care that is Appropriate and Responsible in its Execution Act
- Medicaid IMD ADDITIONAL INFO Act
- Medicaid Institutes for Mental Disease Are Decisive in Delivering Inpatient Treatment for Individuals but Opportunities for Needed Access are Limited without *Information Needed about Facility Obligations Act
- Medicaid PARTNERSHIP Act
- Medicaid Providers Are Required To Note Experiences in Record Systems to Help In-need Patients Act
- Medicaid Reentry Act
- Opioid Addiction Action Plan Act
- Opioid Addiction Recovery Fraud Prevention Act of 2018
- Opioid Quota Reform Act
- PASS Act of 2018
- PROPER Act of 2018
- Preventing Addiction for Susceptible Seniors Act of 2018
- Preventing Drug Diversion Act of 2018
- Providing Reliable Options for Patients and Educational Resources Act of 2018
- REACH OUT Act of 2018
- REGROUP Act of 2018
- Reauthorizing and Extending Grants for Recovery from Opioid Use Programs Act of 2018
- Responsible Education Achieves Care and Healthy Outcomes for Users' Treatment Act of 2018
- SCREEN Act
- SOUND Disposal and Packaging Act
- STOP Act of 2018
- Safe Disposal of Unused Medication Act
- Securing Opioids and Unused Narcotics with Deliberate Disposal and Packaging Act of 2018
- Special Registration for Telemedicine Clarification Act of 2018
- Stop Counterfeit Drugs by Regulating and Enhancing Enforcement Now Act
- Stop Illicit Drug Importation Act of 2018
- Substance Abuse Prevention Act of 2018
- Synthetics Trafficking and Overdose Prevention Act of 2018
- Treating Barriers to Prosperity Act of 2018
- Using Data To Prevent Opioid Diversion Act of 2018
