= Trickett Wendler, Frank Mongiello, Jordan McLinn, and Matthew Bellina Right to Try Act of 2017 =

United States Law

- Long title: To authorize the use of unapproved medical products by patients diagnosed with a terminal illness in accordance with State law, and for other purposes.
- Nicknames: Right to Try Act
- Enacted by: the 115th United States Congress

Citations
- Public law: Pub. L. 115–176 (text) (PDF)
- Statutes at Large: 132 Stat. 1372

Legislative history
- Introduced in the Senate as S. 204 by Ron Johnson (R–WI) on January 24, 2017; Passed the Senate on August 3, 2017 (Unanimous consent); Passed the House on May 22, 2018 (250-169); Signed into law by President Donald Trump on May 30, 2018

The Trickett Wendler, Frank Mongiello, Jordan McLinn, and Matthew Bellina Right to Try Act of 2017 (S. 204, Pub. L. 115–176 (text) (PDF)), also known as the Right to Try Act, is a United States federal law which allows experimental drugs to be administered to terminally ill patients who have exhausted all approved treatment options and are unable to participate in clinical drug trials. All eligible drugs must have undergone the Food and Drug Administration's (FDA) Phase I (safety) testing. The law seeks to increase access to experimental drugs by allowing patients, through their physicians, to request experimental medicines directly from drug manufacturers without involving the FDA. The FDA's expanded access program exists in parallel to the Right to Try Act. There is no legal obligation for drug manufacturers to provide their investigational products to patient who seek them.
