= America's Water Infrastructure Act of 2018 =

United States Law

- Long title: An Act to provide for improvements to the rivers and harbors of the United States, to provide for the conservation and development of water and related resources, to provide for water pollution control activities, and for other purposes.
- Enacted by: the 115th United States Congress

Citations
- Public law: Pub. L. 115–270 (text) (PDF)

Codification
- Acts amended: Water Resources Development Act of 2016, Water Resources Reform and Development Act of 2014, Water Resources Development Act of 2007, Water Resources Development Act of 2000, Water Resources Development Act of 1996, Clean Water Act, Safe Drinking Water Act, Federal Power Act

Legislative history
- Introduced in the Senate as S. 3021 by Amy Klobuchar (D–MN) on June 7, 2018; Committee consideration by Senate Environment and Public Works, House Transportation and Infrastructure; Passed the House on September 13, 2018 (Voice vote); Passed the Senate on October 10, 2018 (99-1); Signed into law by President Donald Trump on October 23, 2018

America's Water Infrastructure Act of 2018 (AWIA) is a United States federal law, enacted during the 115th United States Congress, which provides for water infrastructure improvements throughout the country in the areas of:

- flood control
- navigable waterways
- water resources development
- maintenance and repair of dams and reservoirs
- ecosystem restoration
- public water systems
- financing of improvements
- hydropower development
- technical assistance to small communities.

The law also reauthorizes the Water Infrastructure Finance and Innovation Act of 2014 (WIFIA) which provides expanded financial assistance to communities under the Clean Water Act and Safe Drinking Water Act. These programs are administered by the U.S. Environmental Protection Agency (EPA).

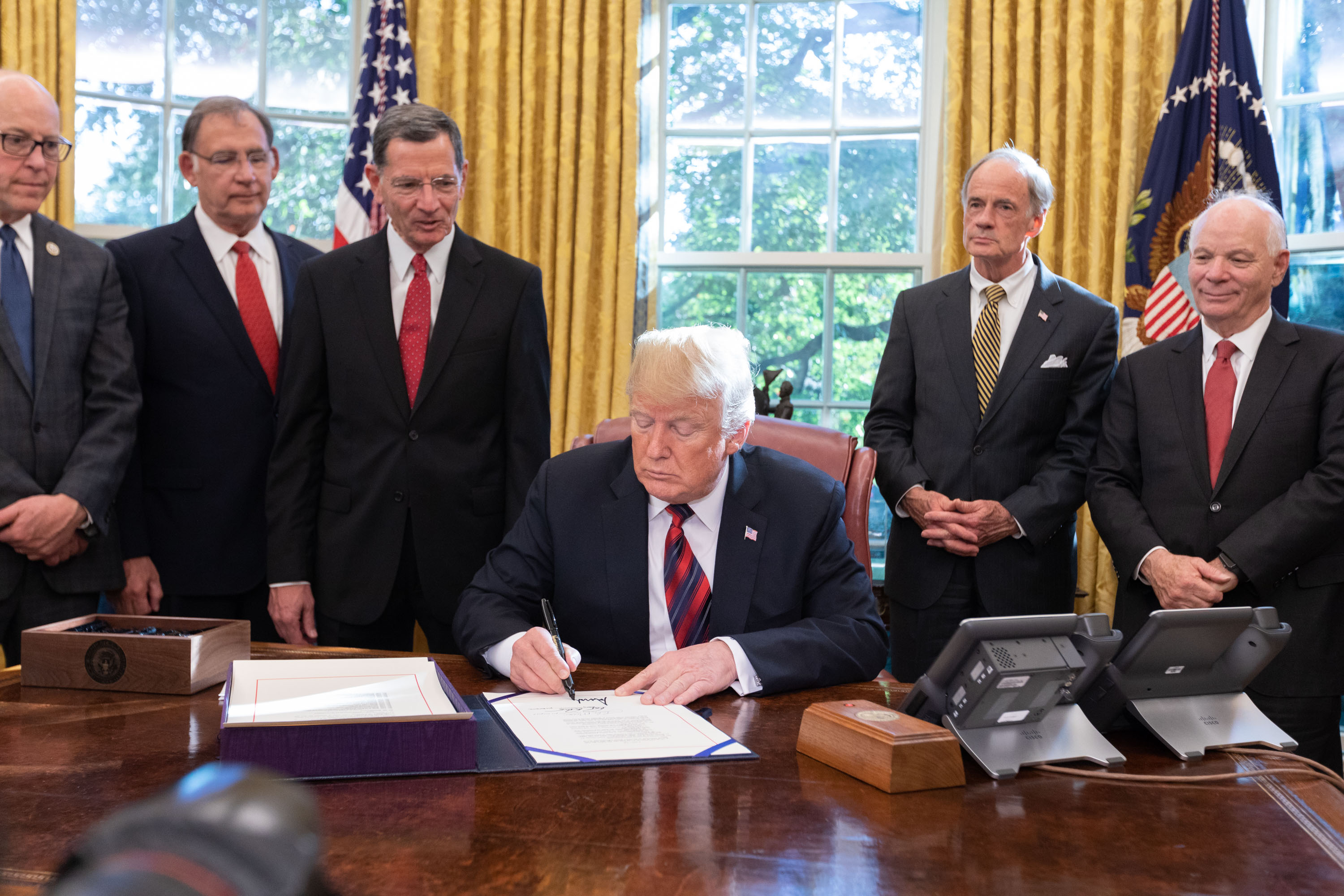
President Trump signs America's Water Infrastructure Act into law.

== Summary of current EPA actions ==
- Modifications to the Drinking Water State Revolving Fund
- Community Water System risk and resilience assessments
- Implementation of amendments to the Emergency Planning and Community Right-to-Know Act
- Administration of funding for the Water Infrastructure Improvements for the Nation (WIIN) Act grant programs
- Development of infrastructure asset management and capacity development strategies for state agencies and public water systems.

== Upcoming EPA actions ==
- Water System Restructuring Rule
- Small System Report to Congress

== SWIFIA ==
Section 4201 of the Act authorised the creation of the state infrastructure financing authority WIFIA (SWIFIA) program. This is a loan program established to support State infrastructure financing authority borrowers, administered by EPA.

== Minneapolis Courthouse ==
Also included in the law is the designation of the United States courthouse located at 300 South Fourth Street in Minneapolis, Minnesota, as the "Diana E. Murphy United States Courthouse".
