= Build Back Better Act =

2021 United States Congress bill

- Long title: To provide for reconciliation pursuant to title II of S. Con. Res. 14.
- Acronyms (colloquial): BBB
- Announced in: the 117th United States Congress

Legislative history
- Introduced in the House of Representatives as H.R. 5376 by John Yarmuth (D–KY) on September 27, 2021; Committee consideration by House Budget Committee; Passed the House on November 19, 2021 (220–213)

The Build Back Better Act was a bill introduced in the 117th Congress to fulfill aspects of President Joe Biden's Build Back Better Plan. It was spun off from the American Jobs Plan, alongside the Infrastructure Investment and Jobs Act, as a $3.5 trillion Democratic reconciliation package that included provisions related to climate change and social policy. Following negotiations, the price was lowered to approximately $2.2 trillion. The bill was passed 220–213 by the House of Representatives on November 19, 2021.

During negotiations, Senator Joe Manchin publicly pulled his support from the bill for not matching his envisioned cost of about $1.75 trillion due to provisions that lasted for less than ten years. After renegotiating the reduction of the Build Back Better Act's size, scope, and cost with Biden and Democratic congressional leaders, Manchin ultimately rejected the bill. Continued negotiations between Manchin and Senate Majority Leader Chuck Schumer eventually resulted in the Inflation Reduction Act of 2022, which incorporated some of the Build Back Better Act's climate change, healthcare, and tax reform proposals while excluding its social safety net proposals.

== Background ==
Before the bill was spun off from the American Jobs Plan (AJP), on April 5, 2021, Senator Joe Manchin proposed raising the corporate tax rate from 21% to 25%, instead of the 28% Biden originally called for. On May 25, Republican senators Pat Toomey and Roger Wicker indicated a lack of support within their caucus to change aspects of the 2017 tax act, and suggested repurposing unspent COVID-19 relief funds. On May 28, Biden released details of a $6 trillion budget proposal for the fiscal year of 2022, which would raise taxes on corporations and millionaires to pay for both the AJP and the American Families Plan (AFP) over 15 years. On June 3, White House press secretary Jen Psaki announced a tweaked AJP proposal that would not increase taxes on corporations, in exchange for closing loopholes and requiring them to pay at least 15%. On June 5, finance ministers from Group of Seven announced that they would support a global 15% corporate tax minimum.

On May 17, seven Democrats on the House Ways and Means Committee signed a letter to the president asking him to prioritize enhanced unemployment insurance (UI) and direct payments (in the style of those included in response to COVID-19 and the related recession) in the AFP. The letter cited Biden's promise to include the former adjusted to "economic conditions", but further that the latter also "served as [a lifeline] to families and workers that have had their lives upended by the pandemic". Previously, on March 31, 21 Senate Democrats sent Biden a letter in favor of further stimulus payments and UI, and in April, the Economic Security Project reported that two additional direct payments could keep 12 million Americans out of poverty.

On May 28, Senate Parliamentarian Elizabeth MacDonough indicated that the current rules dictate that the reconciliation process should not be used more than once during a fiscal year. A majority in the Senate Budget Committee would be needed to change this. On June 3, Senator Manchin advocated against using reconciliation, though other Democrats supported it. On June 16, Senate Majority Leader Charles Schumer met with the Democratic members of the Senate Budget Committee to discuss the option of passing a budget resolution using reconciliation. Democrats were reportedly considering such a bill around $6 trillion. In late June, Manchin said he was open to adjusting the 2017 tax bill and stated his support for a $2 trillion reconciliation bill.

On June 24, a bipartisan group met with the president and reached a $1.2 trillion bipartisan deal focusing on physical infrastructure (such as roads, bridges, railways, water, sewage, broadband, and electric vehicles). Biden stipulated that a separate "human infrastructure" bill (such as child care, home care, and climate change) must also pass, whether through bipartisanship or reconciliation, but later walked back this position. White House officials stated on July 7 that legislative text was nearing completion. On July 14, the Senate Energy and Natural Resources Committee advanced an energy bill expected to be included in the bipartisan package. House Speaker Nancy Pelosi similarly stated that the House would not vote on the physical infrastructure bill until the larger bill passes in the Senate, but later walked back this position as well, as the physical infrastructure package passed the House on November 5 and was signed into law before the larger bill had received a vote.

== Provisions ==
=== Original version ===
The original version of the bill was estimated to cost $3.5 trillion. It may have increased the state and local tax deduction (SALT) deduction limit (which was set at $10,000 in the Tax Cuts and Jobs Act of 2017). It was also expected to include the Protecting the Right to Organize Act labor bill, set a clean electricity standard called the Clean Energy Performance Program, and reform immigration to the extent allowed by reconciliation rules.

On September 9, 2021, Analysis Group published a report commissioned by Evergreen Action and the Natural Resources Defense Council. It found that the plan's Clean Electricity Payment Program was expected to create 7.7 million American jobs over the next decade, generate $907 billion in economic growth, and provide state and local governments over $154 billion in tax revenue.

The House Natural Resources Committee's $25.6 billion portion of the bill included a repeal of a 2017 law requiring the government to lease land at the Arctic National Wildlife Refuge for drilling, and would have banned offshore drilling in both the Atlantic and Pacific oceans, as well as the eastern Gulf of Mexico. A CCC jobs program would have been created. Money was to have been raised via an increase on royalties paid by fossil fuel companies to drill on federal lands and waters, as well as the establishment of a royalty payment for hard-rock mining.

The House Science Committee's $45.51 billion portion included over $4 billion for NASA (although not for human space exploration).

Democrats of the House Transportation Committee proposed $10 billion for transit support, $10 billion for high-speed rail, $4 billion to lower carbon emissions and $4 billion to address the division of communities by highways. Additionally, the bill allotted $2.5 billion to deal with port congestion and $1 billion to reduce aviation-caused carbon emissions.

The bill was expected to generate $1.5 trillion in revenue from corporations and the wealthy. In September, it was reported that House Democrats hoped to increase the corporate tax rate to 26.5% (between Biden's original 28% and Senator Manchin's suggested 25%) as part of the reconciliation bill; the next month, it was reported that the corporate tax rate was unlikely to be increased in the bill due to opposition from Senator Sinema.

Progressive lawmakers pushed in early versions of the bill for funding numerous programs such as the child tax credit, earned income tax credit, and Affordable Care Act subsidies permanently or to 2025, hoping that funding would be renewed.

=== Revised version ===
The revised version of the bill is estimated to cost approximately $2.2 trillion. The White House's legislative framework, the costs of which were disputed by nonpartisan estimates, includes:

- $555 billion for clean energy and climate change provisions
- $400 billion for childcare and preschools
- $200 billion for child tax and earned income tax credits
- $150 billion for home care
- $150 billion for housing
- $130 billion for Affordable Care Act credits
- $90 billion for equity and other investments
- $40 billion for higher education and workforce
- $35 billion to expand Medicare to hearing services

Specifics of the bill include:

- An increase in the SALT deduction limit from $10,000 (expiring in 2026) to $80,000 (expiring in 2030)
- Universal preschool for all three and four-year-olds
- Child-care cost cap of 7% of income for parents earning up to 250% of a state's median income (including faith-based child-care that complies with ideological requirements)
- $35-per-month limit on the cost of insulin under Medicare & limit on out-of-pocket prescription drug costs at $2,000 per year
- Expansion of the maximum pell grant by $550
- Hearing benefits for Medicare beneficiaries, including coverage for a new hearing aid every five years
- One year of expanded child tax credits
- One year of expanded earned income tax credits
- A provision for 4 weeks of paid family and medical leave (included in a package drafted by the House Ways and Means Committee)
- Extended Affordable Care Act subsidies
- More than one million new affordable housing units, and modernizing existing public housing
- Expanded home care for elderly and disabled individuals through Medicaid
- Creation of 1–2 million new apprenticeship slots
- Electric car tax credit of $7,500, plus an extra $4,500 for American-made vehicles built with union labor
- New tax credits for installing solar panels or weatherizing homes

The pending payment methods are:

- $400 billion from IRS reform, including the enforcement of tax payments from taxpayers making over $400,000
- $350 billion by imposing a 15% minimum tax on foreign corporate profits
- $325 billion via a 15% corporate minimum tax (applying to corporations making over $1 billion for three consecutive years)
- $250 billion by closing a Medicare tax loophole benefiting the wealthy
- $230 billion from an adjusted gross income surcharge on the 0.02% most wealthy, applying a 5% rate for those who make $10 million, and an additional 3% surtax above $25 million
- $170 billion by reducing business losses of the wealthy
- $145 billion by repealing the 2017 tax act's rebate rule regarding prescription drugs
- $125 billion via a 1% surcharge on corporate stock buybacks

== Legislative history ==
=== Budget framework negotiations ===
On July 13, the Democrats of the Senate Budget Committee reached a reconciliation budget limit agreement of $3.5 trillion in spending over the next decade. The next day, the Senate released a framework, which included most of the provisions of the AFP. On August 1, Manchin restated his opinion that the bipartisan and reconciliation bills should remain separate, citing concerns about the latter including how it would be paid for and uncertainty regarding whether it would pass. Representative Alexandria Ocasio-Cortez responded by claiming that enough House Democrats would vote to block the passage of the bipartisan bill to force the approval of the incomplete reconciliation bill, citing the possibility of "a lot of corporate lobbyist giveaways" being hidden in the former.

On August 10, the Senate voted along party lines to begin debating a $3.5 trillion budget resolution. Early the next morning, the resolution passed along party lines. In August, a group of several moderate Democratic representatives urged Pelosi to hold a separate House vote on the bipartisan bill, writing, "We will not consider voting for a budget resolution until the bipartisan [bill] passes the House and is signed into law." While reaffirming that the House would not take up the bipartisan bill before the reconciliation bill passes in the Senate, Pelosi announced that she had asked the House Rules Committee to consider the possibility of a rule to advance both packages, though this did not immediately satisfy the group of moderates.

On September 2, Manchin indicated that he only supported between $1–1.5 trillion of the reconciliation package, and called for a "strategic pause". This prompted Biden to state, "I think we can work something out," and Schumer to say, "We're moving full speed ahead." On September 12, Manchin confirmed that he would not yet support the bill, stating, "We don't have the need to rush into this". Biden subsequently held meetings with Senators Manchin and Kyrsten Sinema to discuss their objections to the package. Both House Majority Whip James Clyburn and House Budget Committee chairman John Yarmuth suggested that the bill could be reduced from $3.5 trillion and still meet the president's goals.

On September 23, Schumer announced that the White House and both houses of Congress had reached an agreement concerning a bill payment framework, which he described as a "menu of options". The House Budget Committee advanced the bill in a markup session on September 25; it was next expected be reviewed by the House Rules Committee.

On September 30, Politico reported that Manchin and Schumer secretly signed an agreement proposed by the former in July to limit the total cost of the reconciliation bill to $1.5 trillion. In the text of the agreement, Manchin outlined his conditions for the bill and did not guarantee that he would vote for the final legislation if it exceeded his demands. A spokesperson for Schumer said that he had "merely acknowledged" Manchin's stance on the bill and would try to dissuade him from some of his demands.

=== House passage ===
House speaker Nancy Pelosi in November 2021, summarizing the final House bill

A procedural vote on a House rule concerning the infrastructure and reconciliation bills, as well as the John Lewis Voting Rights Act, passed along party lines on August 24. On September 7, the administration proposed a stopgap spending bill to avoid a government shutdown at the beginning of October. An initial stopgap bill, which included a provision to raise the debt ceiling, was passed by the House along party lines on September 21, but was subsequently blocked along party lines in the Senate. On September 30, a stopgap bill was passed to keep the government open until December 3, prolonging infrastructure negotiations. In early December, a bill was passed to continue funding the government at existing levels through mid-February.

A prospective deadline for the House to advance both the reconciliation and bipartisan bill passed on October 1. On that date, Democratic leaders floated a $2.1 trillion compromise, but Manchin refused to budge above $1.5 trillion. The next day, Pelosi set a new deadline of October 31, having cited Biden's November trip to the 2021 United Nations Climate Change Conference as a hopeful incentive. On October 3, Congressional Progressive Caucus chairwoman Pramila Jayapal rejected Manchin's suggested spending limit, as well as his insistence on including the Hyde Amendment in an expansion to Medicaid. Biden subsequently reaffirmed a target of about $2 trillion, which Manchin signaled being open to. Over the next few weeks, Democratic lawmakers reworked the bill to target the lower cost. Pelosi stated on October 25 that over 90% of its contents had been agreed to. On October 26, legislation for a 15% corporate minimum tax was unveiled; Sinema, a key moderate, stated her support. On October 28, the White House released a framework for the bill. Senate Democrats set a new deadline for around November 19, when the session recessed for Thanksgiving.

On November 1, Manchin stated that he may not support the bill due to it allegedly costing more than claimed in the framework. Senate Budget Committee chairman Bernie Sanders argued that the bipartisan bill, which Manchin helped negotiate, ran up to a $250 billion deficit, while the reconciliation bill was fully paid for. On November 5, the House Rules Committee approved a rule, which if adopted, would kick off debate on the bill. Several moderate Democrats requested a score from the nonpartisan Congressional Budget Office (CBO) before lending their support. The score was released on November 18, finding that the bill would increase the budget deficit by $367 billion over ten years and that an estimated $127 billion would be offset by revenue generated through increased IRS tax enforcement (differing from the Treasury Department's estimate of $400 billion). The same day, the House voted along party lines to advance the bill. On November 19, the bill was passed 220–213 by the House; only one Democrat, Jared Golden of Maine, voted against it, calling an increase in the SALT cap from $10,000 to $80,000 "a $275 billion tax giveaway to millionaires and the wealthy".

Congress	Short title	Bill number(s)	Date introduced	Sponsor(s)	# of cosponsors	Latest status
117th Congress	Build Back Better Act	H.R.5376	September 27, 2021	John Yarmuth (D-KY)	0	Passed in the House.

=== Senate revisions ===
==== Initial negotiations ====
The Senate is expected to revise the bill before sending it back to the House for a final vote. The Senate parliamentarian's review was expected to last through the week of December 7, after which Schumer hopes to bring the bill to a vote—probably the week before Christmas after negotiations with Manchin and Sinema. Manchin has voiced concerns about the bill including its potential effect on inflation and whether it can pass by Christmas; he has called for changes to some of the tax provisions and cutting measures including paid family leave (which costs over $200 billion), a methane fee on energy producer emissions, a Medicare expansion to include hearing costs, and the enhanced child tax credit. Manchin has been negotiating with Tom Carper over methane fees and how it would interact with Environmental Protection Agency methane regulations. Senators Sanders, Jon Tester and Bob Menendez have met to consider options to revise the SALT cap.

On December 10, the CBO released a revised score at the request of senator Lindsey Graham and congressman Jason Smith to view the cost of the bill if certain provisions were extended for the full ten years, although they are not actually set to. The CBO reported that a 10-year extension of the bill would hypothetically increase the bill's gross cost to $4.9 trillion and increase the deficit by $3 trillion over a decade, assuming that the extensions would not be paid for. Republicans rebuked the bill in light of the adjusted score, with Graham later stating that Manchin was "stunned" by it. Democrats quickly denounced the report. National Economic Council Director Brian Deese clarified that the revised score is of a "hypothetical future bill" that Biden would not support, and Treasury Secretary Janet Yellen issued a memo to senators rebutting it as well as a Department of Labor report on the consumer price index indicating that inflation had reached its highest point in 40 years, which the White House attributes to supply-chain issues caused by the pandemic. Biden later said that he did not know if he could secure Manchin's support for the bill; the two held talks on December 13 with plans to continue negotiating. Earlier on that day, Manchin called the modified CBO score "very sobering" and further objected to the bill's reliance on temporary programs amid high inflation as the major reasons he had not yet backed the bill.

Manchin has repeatedly voiced numerous concerns with extending the child tax credit, which is expected to expire. Senate Democrats defended the enhanced child tax credit, arguing that it has greatly reduced child poverty. As of December 2021, the payments reduced child poverty by 30–40% and food insecurity among low-income families by 25%. He has demanded that the child tax credit be narrowly tailored with work requirements, which Biden did not agree to. Manchin argued that Democrats are relying on multiple temporary programs such as the child tax credit that are intended to be extended yearly without funding, and called for the White House to be transparent on its funding in light of the revised CBO score and extend it for 10 years instead of one, which would cost $1.6 trillion. Such an extension would likely force out other priorities in the bill. When Manchin was confronted by reporters on news that he wanted to "zero ... out" the child tax credit from the package, he angrily denied wanting to cut it from the bill, calling them "bullshit". Manchin also privately raised concerns that parents would use their child tax credit payments to buy drugs and abuse paid leave to go hunting during deer season, which shocked his colleagues. He denied he made those concerns and stated through a spokesperson he only objected to the cost. The Census Bureau has published monthly survey data reporting that low-income families that receive the payments have reported using it mostly on necessities like food, utilities, clothing and education.

By mid-December, the Senate Energy and Natural Resources Committee had stripped a ban on all future offshore drilling from the House bill. Manchin, the committee's chairman, also sought to raise onshore drilling royalty rates for the federal oil and gas leasing program to only 16.7% (from 12.5%), instead of the House bill's 18.75%. On December 16, Biden acknowledged that negotiations with Manchin and both parliamentary and procedural steps regarding reconciliation would delay the bill to 2022 but relayed his optimism that it would pass, as well as the competing priority of voting rights legislation.

Following meetings with Parliamentarian Elizabeth MacDonough to make sure all of the provisions comply with the Byrd Rule necessary for passing a bill via reconciliation, Senate Democrats will need to make changes to a negotiated prescription drug pricing provision in the House bill which MacDonough found as violating the rule. MacDonough also ruled against three separate Democratic proposals to reform immigration. According to the CBO, the third effort would have granted temporary amnesty to about 6.5 million non-U.S. nationals, and many of them and others would have become lawful permanent residents. Some Senate Democrats affirmed that they would seek to include immigration measures regardless of the ruling, with Elizabeth Warren arguing that "The reconciliation bill has included immigration provisions multiple times in the past."

On December 14, Manchin quietly presented the White House with an alternate proposal of a scope closer to $1.75 trillion. Manchin's proposal included universal pre-K funded for 10 years, expanded ACA subsidies, and climate change mitigation efforts, but notably excluded an extension of the child tax credit for which he has repeatedly voiced fiscal concerns. It excluded funding for housing and racial equity initiatives, and included proposed tax hikes that Sinema had already opposed.

==== Manchin's standoff ====
On December 19, Manchin announced on both Fox News Sunday and his website that he would not support the bill, citing several factors including the bill's structure, high inflation, the national debt, the severe spread of the COVID-19 Omicron variant, and "geopolitical uncertainty as tensions rise with both Russia and China." He added that many programs, specifically naming the child tax credit, would be extended year after year for a decade, inflating the bill's true cost. The White House, surprised and angered at Manchin's sudden reversal after months of negotiations, unsuccessfully tried to contact him before his announcement. White House Press Secretary Psaki announced a willingness to continue negotiating with Manchin, but said if he was done negotiating this would represent "a sudden and inexplicable reversal in his position" and a "breach of his commitments" to the president and Democratic lawmakers. Biden called Manchin the night of the announcement and discussed reengaging in negotiations in 2022.

Among others, Representatives Ayanna Pressley and Madeleine Dean criticized Manchin for not negotiating in good faith, and both Pressley and Representative Tom Malinowski suggested that he was derailing Biden's agenda before the 2022 midterm elections. Several senators called for a floor vote to force Manchin to publicly vote against the bill. Some Democrats called for a piecemeal approach to the bill's contents to sway Manchin and party leaders back into negotiations. Republicans commended Manchin for rejecting the bill.

On December 20, Manchin said that the bill lacked "accountability" measures to taper its benefits and criticized White House staff for their handling of negotiations; this including being singled out in a December 16 statement by Biden on the stalled negotiations, which Manchin opposed because he thought it would bring unwanted attention to him and his family. He also blamed Democrats and activists for ignoring his point of view since July, specifically that the bill should only cost $1.5 trillion, as they need all 50 Senate votes to pass the bill. Manchin said he would not soon support a less expensive reconciliation bill, saying he would prefer it go through Senate committees, which could take months; he also stated his preference for the standard legislative process, which would require the support of at least 10 Republicans. Pelosi vowed that her caucus would not give up, expressing optimism that Manchin would come around. Schumer announced that the Senate would vote on the bill in January 2022 to make public each senator's position. On December 21, Biden insisted that the bill would fight inflation and address medical costs, expressing optimism he could get Manchin to agree.

One day before the Senate reconvened on January 3, 2022, Axios reported that Manchin was willing to resume negotiations if the enhanced child tax credit was struck or modified to significantly lower the income caps governing eligibility. That day, Schumer said that voting legislation would take immediate precedence. On January 4, Manchin affirmed that "There is no negotiation going on at this time." Some Democrats called to separately pass the climate provisions of the bill after Manchin expressed support on a climate change and clean energy agreement, though he had strong objections to some energy measures he considered punitive to his home state.

Manchin had entered discussions with those seeking to gain his support, among them Counselor to the President Steve Ricchetti, Donald Trump's National Economic Council director Larry Kudlow, and Senator Mitt Romney; they declined to discuss their conversations to reporters. In February 2021 Romney had offered an alternative proposal for the child tax credit, which earned criticism from his GOP colleagues as "welfare assistance".

On January 8, 2022, after a collapse in negotiations, Manchin pulled support for the alternative proposal he had presented to the White House in December 2021. He said he was no longer involved in White House discussions and privately signaled that he was no longer interested in supporting any form of the legislation unless Democrats fundamentally change the bill on his terms. Some Democratic strategists argued in favor of continuing to negotiate with Manchin to craft a new version of the bill. On January 16, Senator Tim Kaine said that although the full package was effectively dead, he still believed that lawmakers would "find the core of the bill and pass it". The White House subsequently touted its accomplishments and support for the bill in a statement and dismissed the dire status of negotiations.

On January 19, Biden acknowledged that it would be better to pass "big chunks" of the bill and try to negotiate other aspects later. He said he thought the provisions for clean energy and early education could pass, but expressed doubt about the child tax credit and college tuition aid. On January 20, Pelosi acknowledged that she expected the bill to be scaled down and rebranded to continue negotiations. She asserted that the bill's provisions related to combatting climate change, expanding health care coverage, and lowering prescription drug costs should remain, but also expressed doubt on universal preschool and the child tax credit. Manchin reiterated that he had pulled support for his compromise bill and that future negotiations would start "from scratch". He maintained that any future bill would have to deal with the pandemic, inflation, the national debt, and prescription drug prices to earn his support. Later in the day, several House Democrats said they would only support a bill if it included an increase to the SALT cap.

On February 1, Manchin said that he was not in discussions over the bill, calling it "dead", and mentioned inflation, COVID-19 and the ongoing Russo-Ukrainian crisis as more important priorities. Sanders strongly criticized his comments.

==== Attempts to salvage and final result ====
After failing to pass the Build Back Better Act earlier in the year, Democrats attempted to pass key provisions of the bill more in line with Manchin's demands. According to Kaine, who is close to Manchin, his party was aiming to pass pieces of the legislation during the spring, preferably by Memorial Day, or before the congressional recess in August 2022. Manchin's spokesperson Sam Runyon said that Manchin had expressed willingness to reengage in negotiations. Progressive Democrats signaled the possibility of a deal with Manchin, but some expressed concern. Manchin said he would not write a partisan bill, believing the White House or Senate Majority Leader Schumer should write it for him to sign off on should it meet his requirements.

After missing the Memorial Day deadline, Senator Ron Wyden said that the new deadline was August 1, 2022, when Congress goes into recess. Manchin said that, besides what he will accept, he wanted efforts to combat inflation as an important priority in the bill. In July, Senate Democrats reached an agreement to end a tax loophole to extend the solvency of Medicare, lower prescription drug prices and raise at least $250 billion in revenue. Manchin opposed sending direct payments to companies that generate clean energy for consumer use and capped energy spending at around $300 billion.

On July 27, Manchin and Schumer announced the Inflation Reduction Act of 2022, the final result of these negotiations, surprising other congressional Democrats. The bill, which includes provisions on tax, health care, and climate and energy spending, was introduced in the Senate as an amendment to the Build Back Better Act. On August 7, the Senate passed the bill on a 50–50 vote with Vice President Harris breaking the tie. On August 12, 2022, the House passed the bill on a 220–207 vote. President Biden signed it into law on August 16.

== Expected impact ==
=== Economic ===
Analysts from the Tax Foundation, Tax Policy Center, Committee for a Responsible Federal Budget and Moody's Analytics all agreed that the bill will cause a modest short-term increase in inflation and have a marginal impact over the long run. In early December, economist Alan Blinder wrote an opinion article for The Wall Street Journal in favor of passing the bill.

Goldman Sachs cut its economic forecast for the U.S. after Manchin rejected the bill, lowering its GDP growth forecasts in the first three quarters of 2022. It further noted that upcoming inflation and the Omicron variant's spread would further discourage support for the bill as a priority. Moody's Analytics was also likely to downgrade its U.S. economic forecast in the days after Manchin's announcement.

=== Energy ===
The bill's clean energy provisions, especially its $320 billion investment in clean energy and electric vehicle tax credits, are expected to fulfill Biden's goal of cutting emissions by 50% by 2030. Princeton professor Jesse Jenkins, who assisted with the bill, estimated it at 40%. Congressional Progressive Caucus chair Pramila Jayapal called for executive action on those provisions in light of Manchin expressing his opposition to the bill.

=== Health ===
The Build Back Better Act included provisions to expand Medicare services for older adults with sensory impairments. The initial version aimed to address gaps in Medicare such as dental, vision, and hearing coverage, but both dental and vision benefits were removed after objections by Senators Joe Manchin and Kyrsten Sinema. At the time, Medicare covered only limited hearing services, such as cochlear implantation. The Build Back Better Act would have added hearing services subject to Medicare Part B deductible and 20% coinsurance from 2023; these services include hearing aids for moderately severe to profound hearing loss and services offered by audiologists. In the US, among older adults who could benefit from hearing aids, only 1 in 3 reported ever using them. This is in part attributable to lack of treatment access and the out-of-pocket cost, which averaged $914. Adding coverage for hearing services would have helped Medicare beneficiaries who otherwise could not afford it receive this kind of care.

== Reactions ==
=== Public opinion ===
According to a Harvard CAPS-Harris Poll survey in early-August, voters narrowly opposed the bill 51%–49%. Shortly after the missed October 1 deadline to pass the reconciliation package, protestors separately confronted Senators Manchin and Sinema. A CBS News poll from October 10 showed support for the bill at 54%, with 46% opposed. A Data for Progress/Fighting Chance for Families poll found that support for making the child tax credit permanent (which the bill is only set to continue for a year) was about 50%. A Monmouth University poll from early December showed 61% support for the legislation. An online poll by the right-leaning pollster Rasmussen Reports in the same month indicated most Americans did not support the bill. The Biden administration faced a decline in approval ratings as it tried to cut portions of the bill to gain Manchin's and Sinema's support.

=== International ===
In a letter sent to eight Senate leaders, Deputy Prime Minister of Canada Chrystia Freeland and International Trade Minister Mary Ng detailed their concerns with the extra $4,500 EV tax credit for American-made (union-manufactured) vehicles and threatened that if it is passed, Canada would retaliate by launching a dispute settlement process under the USMCA along with tariffs targeting various American industries, including the auto sector and dairy.

Mexico also threatened retaliation if the extra $4,500 EV tax credit is passed.

An additional letter expressing concerns over the proposed EV tax credit structure, signed by 29 ambassadors, was sent to Speaker Pelosi, Senator Schumer, Senator McConnell, and Congressman McCarthy on October 29, 2021. The letter was signed by the ambassadors of the EU, Germany, Poland, the Czech Republic, Croatia, Ireland, Cyprus, Sweden, Malta, Spain, Netherlands, France, Austria, South Korea, Greece, Canada, Belgium, Finland, Slovenia, Mexico, Slovakia, Japan, Estonia, Italy, and Romania.

=== Business ===
In a Wall Street Journal conference, Tesla CEO Elon Musk, whose company would not be eligible for the electric vehicle (EV) tax credit, argued that lawmakers should "can" the whole bill over concerns of the federal deficit and the EV tax credit, saying that his company "has made roughly two-thirds of all the electric cars in the United States" and that "we don't need the $7,500 tax credit."
