= Parliamentarian =

Parliamentarian usually refers to a member of parliament. It may also refer to:

- Parliamentarian (consultant), an expert in parliamentary procedure
- Parliamentarian of the United States House of Representatives
- Parliamentarian of the United States Senate
- Roundheads, also known as Parliamentarians during the English Civil War
- A member of the National Association of Parliamentarians
- A member of the American Institute of Parliamentarians
- An official in Congressional Debate, a scholastic debate format

== See also ==
- Parliament
- Parliamentary system
- Parliament of England
- Parliamentary procedure
- Councilor
