= Alan Frumin =

American lawyer and political advisor (born 1946)

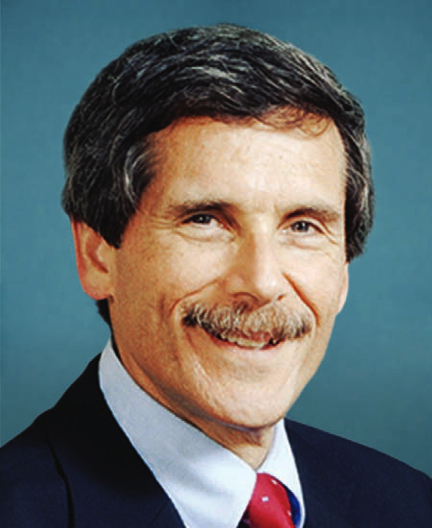

Parliamentarian of the United States Senate
- In office May 9, 2001 – February 2, 2012
- Preceded by: Robert Dove
- Succeeded by: Elizabeth MacDonough
- In office January 1987 – January 1995
- Preceded by: Robert Dove
- Succeeded by: Robert Dove

Personal details
- Born: Alan Scott Frumin; December 26, 1946 (age 78); New York City, New York, U.S.
- Spouse: Jill Brown
- Education: Colgate University (BA); Georgetown University (JD)

Alan Scott Frumin (/ˈfruːmɪn/; born December 26, 1946) is a former parliamentarian of the United States Senate.

== Career ==
A 1968 graduate of Colgate University in Hamilton, New York and Georgetown University Law Center, Frumin's entire career has been spent giving non-partisan procedural advice in the United States Congress. He began his career in 1974 by participating in the editing of Deschler's Precedents of the House of Representatives (the official authoritative compilation of the precedents of the House) before joining the Senate Parliamentarian's Office in 1977. He is the editor of Riddick's Senate Procedure, the official authoritative compilation of Senate precedents.

He was promoted to the position of parliamentarian in 1987 when the Democratic party obtained a majority and control of the Senate, and the incumbent parliamentarian, Robert Dove, was dismissed. In 1995, when the Republican party regained control of the Senate, Dove was reinstated as parliamentarian, and Frumin was returned to his previous position as top assistant. In 1997, while serving as the senior assistant parliamentarian, the Senate honored Frumin by granting him the status of parliamentarian emeritus. In May 2001, Dove was again dismissed, this time by the Republican majority leader, Trent Lott of Mississippi, and Frumin was again promoted to parliamentarian, thus becoming the first person to become parliamentarian under both parties. He was subsequently retained as parliamentarian at each successive change in party control of the Senate: in June 2001; January 2003; and January 2007. His 35-year-and-one-month tenure in the Senate Parliamentarian's Office is the longest such tenure in the history of that office, and his 18-year and 10-month service as parliamentarian is second only to the 29½ years served by Charles L. Watkins, the Senate's first parliamentarian.

Frumin began receiving significant media coverage and notice in his usually quiet role during the 2010 healthcare reform debate for the critical role he played in determining the validity of the reconciliation procedure being employed to apply changes desired by the House to portions of the Patient Protection and Affordable Care Act passed by both houses.

In November 2011, Frumin was included on The New Republic's list of Washington's most powerful, least famous people.

== Family ==
Frumin was born December 26, 1946, to Harry H. and Nanette Frumin in New York, New York. He has one sister, Leslie. On February 15, 1981, he married Federal Trade Commission lawyer Jill Meryl (née Brown); they have one daughter, Allison.

Government offices
Preceded by Robert Dove	Parliamentarian of the United States Senate; 1987–1995	Succeeded by Robert Dove
Preceded by Robert Dove	Parliamentarian of the United States Senate; 2001–2012	Succeeded by Elizabeth MacDonough
