= Floyd M. Riddick =

American Senate parliamentarian (1908–2000)

Floyd Riddick
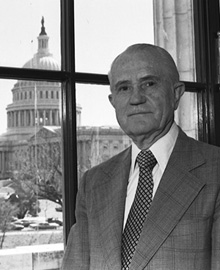

Parliamentarian of the United States Senate
- In office 1964–1974
- Preceded by: Charles L. Watkins
- Succeeded by: Murray Zweben

Personal details
- Born: July 13, 1908 Trotville, North Carolina, U.S.
- Died: January 25, 2000 (aged 91) Santa Fe, New Mexico, U.S.
- Spouse: Marguerite Riddick
- Education: Duke University (BA, PhD); Vanderbilt University (MA)

Floyd Millard Riddick (July 13, 1908 – January 25, 2000) was a Parliamentarian of the United States Senate from 1964 to 1974, and is most famous for developing Riddick's Senate procedure. He sat immediately below the presiding officer in the Senate chamber, providing information on precedents and advising other senators on parliamentary procedure. He is famous for discussions of the censures of Joseph McCarthy and Thomas Dodd, the contested election between John A. Durkin and Louis Wyman, and the preparations for a planned impeachment trial of Richard Nixon. He is also famous for advocating the change in the rules of cloture.

== Early life ==
Floyd M. Riddick was born in Trotville, North Carolina in an agrarian area. His father was a farmer and merchant who did not finish primary school. Floyd Riddick's ancestor, Lemuel Riddick, was one of the signers of the Stamp Act passed by the House of Burgesses of Virginia. Riddick's family lived in a village, Gatesville, North Carolina. After his father became ill, in 1928, Riddick moved to Suffolk, Virginia. After finishing high school, Floyd M. Riddick attended Duke University and received the Bachelor of Arts degree. He was originally majoring in pre-law but then switched his major to political science after a talk with an influential professor, Robert Rankin. He then received a master's degree at Vanderbilt University in 1932, and returned to Duke to receive his Ph.D. in political science in 1935. While researching his doctoral dissertation, he spent a year observing the workings of the United States House of Representatives, a study which he eventually expanded and published as Congressional Procedure in 1941.

== Career and death ==
After moving to Washington, D.C., he first worked as a statistical analyst for the FERA, and then for the Resettlement Administration. He then continued his congressional research interests, as an instructor of political science at American University from 1936 to 1939. He then received a position as an editor of the Congressional Daily for Congressional Intelligence, Inc., from 1939 to 1943. From 1943 to 1947, he edited the Legislative Daily for the U.S. Chamber of Commerce. He was then invited to establish a "Daily Digest," in the Congressional Record. From 1947 to 1951, he was Senate editor of "Daily Digest", a synopsis of Congressional events which continues as a handy guide to the daily Record. He then joined the office of the parliamentarian, where he worked for 24 years. His work has appeared in the American Political Science Review and Western Political Quarterly. From 1951 to 1964, Riddick served as the Assistant Senate Parliamentarian. Floyd M. Riddick succeeded Charles L. Watkins as the Senate Parliamentarian in 1964, and held that position until 1974. During this time, he was also a key player in the development of the first collegiate-level Model United States Senate at Stetson University, serving as their first Parliamentarian who also urged real senators and house representatives he knew from his career to attend as guest speakers. As parliamentarian emeritus, he remained as a consultant to the United States Senate Committee on Rules and Administration. Floyd M. Riddick died in Santa Fe, New Mexico at age 91, on January 25, 2000.

== Bibliography ==
- Riddick's Rules of Procedure: A Modern Guide to Faster and More Efficient Meetings (1991)
- Robert's Rules of Order (1986) [one of the revisors]
- Senate Procedure (1958,1964,1974)
- Congressional Procedure (1941)

Government offices
Preceded by Charles Watkins	Parliamentarian of the United States Senate; 1964–1974	Succeeded by Murray Zweben
