= Riddick's Senate Procedure =

United States Senate document

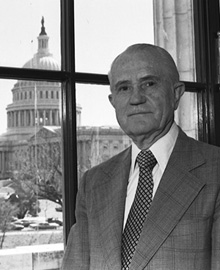
Floyd M. Riddick

In the United States Congress, Riddick's Senate Procedure is a Senate document containing the contemporary precedents and practices of the Senate. It was named after Senate Parliamentarian Emeritus Floyd Riddick, and is updated periodically by the Senate Parliamentarian.

Riddick's Senate Procedure included over ten thousand U.S. Senate precedents as of its latest release in 1992. Senate precedents are created when the presiding officer rules on a point of order raised by a Senator, or alternately, in a majority vote of the Senate if a Senator appeals the presiding officer's ruling.
