= American College of Parliamentary Lawyers =

- Type: Non-profit
- Legal status: Active
- Headquarters: America
- Official language: English
- Website: parliamentarylawyers.org

The American College of Parliamentary Lawyers (ACPL) is a professional association of lawyers from the United States and Canada.

== Objective ==
Founded in 2007, the College states that one of its purposes is "to provide a forum for the exchange of information among experienced legal professionals for the purpose of the advancement of parliamentary law". This organization also advocates the use of parliamentary procedure in voluntary organizations.

== Overview ==
"Parliamentary law" (i.e. the procedures used by deliberative assemblies to make decisions in meetings) is separate from the legal matters that lawyers are trained in. Generally, lawyers are not necessarily also parliamentarians, or experts in meeting procedures. As a result, this association was formed to connect the two fields. Only individuals who are both lawyers and parliamentarians could be members in this organization.

For its meetings, ACPL uses Robert's Rules of Order Newly Revised (RONR) to conduct its business.

== See also ==
- American Institute of Parliamentarians
- National Association of Parliamentarians
