= YMC =

YMC may be an abbreviation for:

- Yale Model Congress, USA
- Young Magicians Club, United Kingdom
- YMC (motorcycles and buggies), vehicle manufacturer from Greece
- Ye Maaya Chesave, a 2010 Telugu film.
