= Yale Model Government Europe =

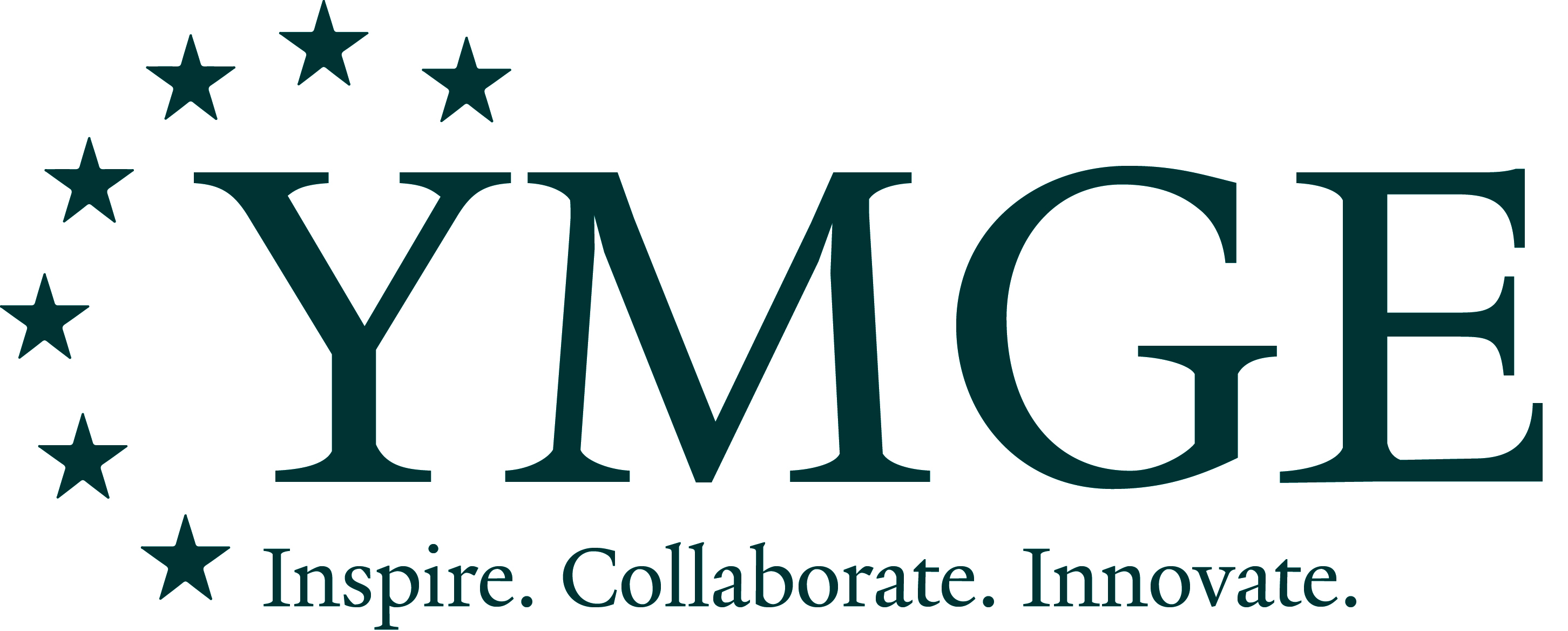
- Abbreviation: YMGE
- Formation: 2010
- Type: Model United Nations Student organization
- Purpose: International politics, International relations, Diplomacy, Education, and Public speaking
- Location: Yale University, New Haven, Connecticut
- Official language: English
- President: Ahmed Alananzeh
- Main organ: Secretariat
- Affiliations: Yale International Relations Association
- Website: ymge.org

Yale Model Government Europe (YMGE) is a constituent program of the Yale International Relations Association (YIRA) at Yale University. Founded in 2010 under the auspices of the YIRA Independent Initiatives Program, YMGE is now a registered civic organization in the Czech Republic. The inaugural conference, YMGE 2011, took place in November 2011 in Prague hosting delegates from around the world. The second annual YMGE in 2012 drew 300 students from 25 countries spanning four continents. From 2013 onwards, YMGE has been hosted in Budapest, Hungary, and has now risen to about 375 attending delegates each year. Beginning in 2019, YMGE has relocated to Lisbon, Portugal, where it has expanded its attendance to include delegates from across the globe.

== Conference information ==
YMGE was created in an effort to reimagine the Model United Nations conference in a way that would be both more educational and more dynamic for delegates. It combines the best of American and European conference styles to create a hybrid, crisis-based format. The conference comprises two types of sessions. In standard committee debate, delegates in YMGE's 12x12 crisis fixture are placed in a Cabinet representing the different ministers of each of 12 European Union nations, where they address pressing issues within (and sometimes across) their nations' borders. When YMGE's unique crisis arc is revealed, delegates shift into Councils, which are 12 E.U. bodies made up of ministers of the same position from all 12 Cabinets. During these crisis sessions, delegates have the urgent responsibility of dealing with the crisis at hand within the bounds of their Council's authority and power. As in the real world, these committees form the framework of an integrated Europe: when something happens in the world that affects one committee, it affects all committees. Every committee will be kept abreast of developments in each of the others; if a new policy passed by the Belgian cabinet has repercussions in Denmark, it will be up to the Danish ministers to react.

== Leadership ==
YMGE's leadership consists of a Secretariat of eight members. At its helm, YMGE's current president is Ahmed Alananzeh. Two Directors General, making up the Senior Secretariat, manage YMGE's Committees and Operations sides. Committees encompasses all of the Cabinets, Councils, and Specialized Bodies that delegates participate in, recruitment of Yale University undergraduates to lead committees, and YMGE's educational mission. Operations leads YMGE's recruitment efforts of European and international delegations, programming during the conference, and all logistical aspects of the conference.

Five Under-Secretaries-General make up YMGE's Core Secretariat, in charge of International Recruitment, European Recruitment, Conference, Branding, and Committees. Sixteen Directors prepare and lead YMGE's Cabinets, Councils, and Specialized Bodies.

== Hosts ==
- 2011 - Prague, Czech Republic
- 2012 - Prague, Czech Republic
- 2013 - Budapest, Hungary
- 2014 - Budapest, Hungary
- 2015 - Budapest, Hungary
- 2016 - Budapest, Hungary
- 2017 - Budapest, Hungary
- 2018 - Budapest, Hungary
- 2019 - Lisbon, Portugal
- 2023 - Athens, Greece

== See also ==
- List of Yale University student organizations
- Model Congress
- Yale Political Union
- Yale International Relations Association
