= American Institute of Parliamentarians =

US educational organization

- Abbreviation: AIP
- Formation: 1958; 68 years ago
- Type: Professional association
- Tax ID no.: 36-6131545
- Legal status: 501(c)(3)
- Headquarters: 1100 E Woodfield Rd, Suite 350, Schaumburg, Illinois 60173, U.S.
- Coordinates: 36.162342°N 86.782563°W
- President: Dr. Robert M. Peskin, CP
- Parliamentarian: Al Gage, CPP-T, PRP, PAP
- Revenue: $142,377
- Website: aipparl.org

The American Institute of Parliamentarians (AIP) is a not-for-profit educational organization founded in 1958. The objectives of AIP are to promote the use and teaching of parliamentary procedure, as well as the training and certification of parliamentarians.

This organization had 48 members in its first year. It has grown to more than 1,200 members throughout the world, with most of the members residing in North America.

AIP uses many parliamentary authorities in its education programs. This diversity allows members and students to be aware of the common parliamentary procedures, understand the history and theory of why certain procedures exist, and advise organizations on the availability of different procedures.

For one of the parliamentary authorities, The Standard Code of Parliamentary Procedure, AIP was involved in its revision following the death of the original author.

Many members of AIP are also members of the National Association of Parliamentarians (NAP), and both organizations have worked together with joint NAP/AIP Chapters, collaboration on a Code of Ethics for Parliamentarians, and joint conferences. One of the main differences between the two organizations is that NAP focuses on Robert's Rules of Order Newly Revised (RONR), while AIP stresses proficiency and familiarity with a variety of parliamentary authorities.

== Levels ==
- Member – Anyone interested in joining completes an application and pays their dues.
- FFA Member – Members of the National FFA Organization are offered free membership until the age of 30 for competing in the National Parliamentary Procedure contest. The contest consists of several exams of parliamentary knowledge, as well as a demonstration of a real-life business meeting, followed by oral questions.
- Certified Parliamentarian (CP) – A member must pass a written examination and provide a certain amount of service as a parliamentarian. The written examination contains multiple choice, short answer, essay questions, and scripting on procedures covered in Robert's Rules of Order Newly Revised, The Standard Code of Parliamentary Procedure. There are approximately 50 active (non-retired) CPs worldwide.
- Certified Professional Parliamentarian (CPP) – A member must be a Certified Parliamentarian in good standing and must pass an oral examination covering the current editions of Robert's Rules of Order Newly Revised, The Standard Code of Parliamentary Procedure, Cannon's Concise Guide to Rules of Order, and Parliamentary Opinions II. Additional suggested reading includes Parliamentary Law, Parliamentary Opinions I, and Riddick's Rules of Procedure. In addition to demonstrating a thorough knowledge of these manuals, the examinee must also demonstrate expertise in presiding and provide additional service as a parliamentarian. There are approximately 50 active (non-retired) CPPs worldwide.
- Designated Teacher of Parliamentary Procedure (CP-T or CPP-T) – A member must complete a teacher education course offered by Education Department of AIP and must show evidence of a certain amount of successful teaching experience.

In order to retain CP or CPP status, the member must participate in continuing education.

== Publications ==
- Parliamentary Journal – a quarterly publication covering aspects of parliamentary procedure.
- The Communicator – a quarterly newsletter covering news and information on the organization.

AIP published works on parliamentary procedure, including Fundamentals of Parliamentary Law and Procedure, Complete Minutes Manual, and How to be a Parliamentarian.

== See also ==
- American College of Parliamentary Lawyers
- National Association of Parliamentarians
