= Jesse Jenkins =

American energy systems engineer and academic

- Born: Forest Grove, Oregon
- Education: University of Oregon; Massachusetts Institute of Technology
- Awards: Time 100 Next (2024); Time 100 Climate (2024)
- Scientific career
- Fields: Engineering; clean energy
- Workplaces: Princeton University

Jesse D. Jenkins is an American energy systems engineer who currently serves as a tenured Associate Professor at Princeton University, holding a joint position in both the Department of Mechanical and Aerospace Engineering and the Andlinger Center for Energy and the Environment. For his work on the US energy transition to green energy, in particular the Inflation Reduction Act, he was made one of the Time 100 Next and the Time 100 Climate, both in 2024.

== Biography ==
Jesse D. Jenkins was born and raised in Forest Grove, Oregon and attended the University of Oregon, where he took an interdisciplinary course of study in philosophy, political science, energy studies, and computer science. He went on to work at the Renewable Northwest Project before becoming Co-Director of Breakthrough Generations and then serving as Director of Energy and Climate Policy at the Breakthrough Institute, where he wrote policy framework around clean energy.

He left the institute to begin his PhD at MIT in the fall of 2012. He also earned a SM from MIT, and worked as a postdoctoral fellow at the Harvard Kennedy School. He then joined the faculty of Princeton in 2019, where he serves as a professor in both the Department of Mechanical and Aerospace Engineering and the Andlinger Center for Energy and the Environment. He also heads the ZERO Lab.

He was heavily involved with the Build Back Better Act. He led a team of climate modelers at his ZERO Lab who modeled the effects on emissions and the economy based on varying versions of the Act, and helped to decide where governmental funding on climate change should go. A year after the passing of the Inflation Reduction Act, which included many of the aspects of the Build Back Better Act, he reflected on the progress, finding that the pace of emissions cuts increased from 2% per year to 4% per year after the Act but that this change was still insufficient to meet the goal, which would require 6%.

He has focused on the United States power grid and how it needs to change to attain net-zero emissions by 2050.

He was named one of the Time 100 Next in 2024: his profile was written by Bill McKibben. He was also named one of the Time 100 Climate in 2024.

He was promoted to a tenured Associate Professor position in 2025.
