= Robert Dove =

Parliamentarian of the United States Senate (1938–2021)

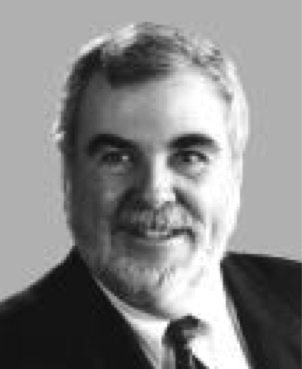

Parliamentarian of the United States Senate
- In office January 1995 – May 2001
- Preceded by: Alan Frumin
- Succeeded by: Alan Frumin
- In office 1981 – January 1987
- Preceded by: Murray Zweben
- Succeeded by: Alan Frumin

Personal details
- Born: October 18, 1938 Hamilton, Ohio, U.S.
- Died: July 28, 2021 (aged 82) Charleston, South Carolina, U.S.
- Children: 2; including Laura Dove
- Education: Ohio State University (BA); Duke University (MA, PhD); Georgetown University (JD)

Robert B. Dove (October 18, 1938 – July 28, 2021) was a parliamentarian of the United States Senate and a professor of political science at George Washington University.

== Early life and education ==
Dove was born in Hamilton, Ohio and attended Ohio State University (BA, 1960), Duke University (MA, 1963; PhD, 1967) and Georgetown University (JD). He was a professor and lecturer at The Citadel and Iowa State University in the early 1960s.

== Career ==
Dove joined the Parliamentarian's office in 1966. He was named Parliamentarian in 1981 and remained in the position until he was dismissed by Democratic Majority Leader Robert Byrd in 1987 after the Democratic Party obtained a majority and control of the Senate. He was replaced by Alan Frumin.

He served on the staff of Senator Robert Dole from 1987 until 1995, when he was again appointed Parliamentarian. In 2001, he determined that Senate rules allow only one budget bill per year related to revenue to be immune from filibuster, a process known as reconciliation.

Provisions in a reconciliation bill, one provided for in section 310 of the Congressional Budget and Impoundment Control Act of 1974, may be deleted if the Parliamentarian finds it has only policy implications and no budgetary implications, and hence be subject to a point of order.

Later that year, Dove ruled against a Republican provision to allocate over $5 billion in the 2002 budget for natural disasters. Following Republican anger about these rulings, he was dismissed by Republican Majority Leader Trent Lott. He was again replaced by Alan Frumin.

Upon leaving the Senate, he became a professor at The George Washington University, specializing in Congressional issues. He also served as a parliamentary consultant to a number of foreign legislatures, including the State Duma of Russia, the National Assembly of Bulgaria, the Assembly of Representatives of Yemen, the National Assembly of Kuwait, and the Parliament of Poland.

On July 28, 2021, Dove died of congestive heart failure in Charleston, South Carolina.

Government offices
Preceded by Murray Zweben	Parliamentarian of the United States Senate; 1981–1987	Succeeded by Alan Frumin
Preceded by Alan Frumin	Parliamentarian of the United States Senate; 1995–2001	Succeeded by Alan Frumin
