= Fundamentals of Parliamentary Law and Procedure =

Study book on parliamentary procedure

Fundamentals of Parliamentary Law and Procedure is a study book on basic parliamentary procedure. It was created by the American Institute of Parliamentarians and published by Kendall-Hunt and is one of the sources of questions for their Certified Parliamentarian examinations.

Editions:

- First
- Second: 1992
- Third: 2005
