= Elizabeth MacDonough =

American lawyer (born 1966)

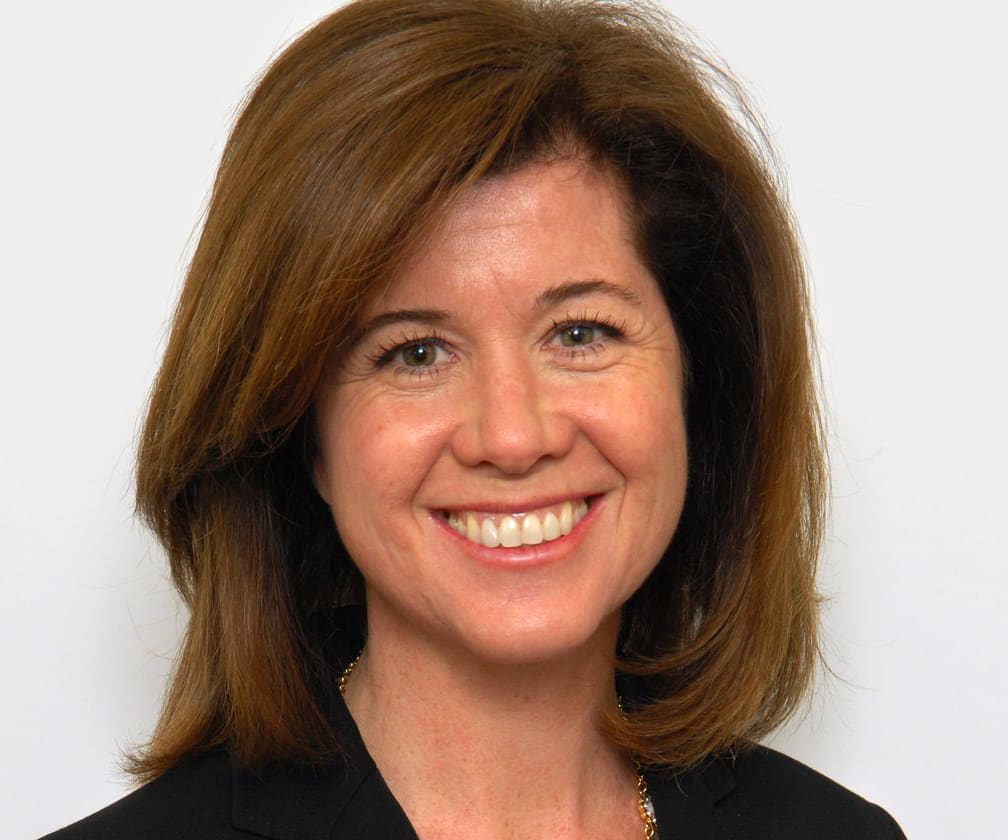

6th Parliamentarian of the United States Senate
- Incumbent
- Assumed office February 2, 2012
- Preceded by: Alan Frumin

Personal details
- Born: Elizabeth Coss MacDonough; February 16, 1966 (age 60)
- Education: George Washington University (BA); Vermont Law School (JD)

Elizabeth Coss MacDonough (born February 16, 1966) is an American lawyer who has been the parliamentarian of the United States Senate since 2012. The first woman to hold the position, MacDonough guided the Senate through the first and second impeachment trials of Donald Trump.

== Early life and education ==
MacDonough grew up near Washington DC, graduating from Greens Farms Academy in 1984 and earning her bachelor's degree from George Washington University in 1988.

MacDonough began her career in 1990 as a legislative reference assistant in the Senate library and later as assistant morning business editor to the Congressional Record. She left in 1995 to attend Vermont Law School, graduating with a JD in 1998. During law school, MacDonough interned with Judge Royce C. Lamberth (United States District Court for the District of Columbia) and the Immigration and Naturalization Service in Burlington, Vermont.

After graduating, MacDonough worked as a trial attorney for the United States Department of Justice handling immigration cases in New Jersey. MacDonough joined the office of the Senate Parliamentarian in May 1999 as an assistant parliamentarian and was promoted to senior assistant parliamentarian in 2002. She advised then-Vice President Al Gore on the procedure for counting ballots following Bush v. Gore.

== Senate Parliamentarian ==
MacDonough delivers her only public address each year to the United States Senate Youth Program.

=== Democratic majority (2012–2015) ===
At her appointment to Parliamentarian in 2012, she was praised by outgoing Parliamentarian Alan Frumin as "down-to-earth," describing her personal knowledge of Capitol staffers; and by Senator Richard Shelby (R-AL) as "smart, diligent ... and she's got integrity." Sen. John Thune (R-SD) said "she's very steeped in the traditions of the Senate and understands how it works here" and Sen. Mark Warner (D-VA) said he had "no question about her ability to read the rules and make the right decisions."

=== Republican majority (2015–2021) ===
During the 2015 congressional effort to partially repeal the Patient Protection and Affordable Care Act (ACA), MacDonough ruled the provision that would roll back the Independent Payment Advisory Board disqualified the 2015 package from consideration as a reconciliation bill in the Senate under the Byrd Rule, which requires that reconciliation bills must have a budgetary effect. Rather than the simple, filibuster-free 51-vote majority required to pass a reconciliation bill, the 2015 package would require a 60-vote threshold to pass in the Senate, which effectively killed the legislation in the Senate, as Republicans did not hold the requisite votes. Sen. Ted Cruz (R-TX) commented MacDonough should be fired or ignored, although since the procedural rulings are officially made by the president of the Senate (in 2015, it was then-Vice President Joe Biden), firing MacDonough would have made no difference, and Sen. John Cornyn (R-TX), the senior senator from Texas, dismissed Cruz's comments, saying ousting MacDonough would be "like firing the judge if you disagree with his ruling."

In January 2017, Speaker of the House of Representatives Paul Ryan (R-WI) said that MacDonough would be the person to "watch" in the Senate, because budget reconciliation would likely again be the tool used to pass amendments to the Affordable Care Act.

During the passage of the Tax Cuts and Jobs Act of 2017 MacDonough ruled the repeal of the Johnson Amendment, which limits the political speech of churches, could not be included in the bill. In January 2017, MacDonough ruled that a provision in the Tax Cuts and Jobs Act that would open the 1002 area of the Arctic National Wildlife Refuge to oil and gas drilling, met the conditions of the Byrd Rule under budget reconciliation.

In 2017, MacDonough read the language of Senate Rule XIX to Senator Steve Daines (R-MT), presiding over a Senate session, which Daines carefully repeated while warning Sen. Elizabeth Warren (D-MA) for reading statements from Ted Kennedy and Coretta Scott King condemning the nomination of Jeff Sessions. The Senate subsequently voted 49 to 43 to uphold Majority Leader Mitch McConnell's objection that Warren had impugned Sessions's character.

In a 2018 commencement speech at her alma mater, Vermont Law School, MacDonough called the invocation of the 'nuclear option' in 2013 and 2017 as a "stinging defeat that I tried not to take personally". The 2013 vote removed the need for a three-fifths supermajority for cloture for all executive and judicial nominations bar those for the Supreme Court, while the 2017 vote removed the requirement for nominations to the Supreme Court.

MacDonough received attention prior to the 2020 impeachment trial of Donald Trump due to her role in advising Chief Justice John Roberts on parliamentary procedure while presiding over the trial.

MacDonough has been praised by President pro tempore Patrick Leahy (D-VT) and former majority whip John Cornyn (R-TX), with Leahy saying that he had "been here with many, many parliamentarians. All were good. But she's the best", and Cornyn saying that "she's tough" and "she calls them straight down the middle."

In June 2020, MacDonough provided a decision to Senator Josh Hawley (R-MO) ruling that a vote on the senator's WTO withdrawal resolution was in order. However, she reversed herself two weeks later after considering new arguments regarding the timetable requirements from Senator Chuck Grassley (R-IA) and Senator Ron Wyden (D-Ore.).

=== Democratic majority (2021–2025) ===
On January 6, 2021, MacDonough and her staff safeguarded the Electoral College votes from the 2020 presidential election by removing them to a secure location as rioters breached the Capitol building.

On February 25, 2021, she ruled against the $15 minimum wage provision in President Biden's proposed COVID-19 relief package being included per the Byrd Rule under budget reconciliation. Some progressive Democrats wanted McDonough to be overruled on the matter, including Rep. Ilhan Omar who called for her to be fired. Vice President Kamala Harris, as president of the Senate, declined to overrule the parliamentarian. In April 2021, she ruled that Democrats could pass spending legislation with a simple majority using a procedure reserved for budget reconciliation. In the past, this rule was limited to being used once per year, but MacDonough ruled that it could be used multiple times per year if the bill was budget-related.

On September 19, 2021, she ruled against allowing a pathway to legalization for millions of immigrants to be included in the Democrats' $3.5 trillion reconciliation bill, stating that "changing the law to clear the way to [Legal Permanent Resident] status is tremendous and enduring policy change that dwarfs its budgetary impact." On September 30, protesters blocked traffic on the Golden Gate Bridge for about an hour to call for a path to citizenship, with some carrying a banner urging Democrats to "overrule the parliamentarian".

=== Republican majority (2025–present) ===
In early April 2025, Senate Republicans developed a budget resolution which set current spending as the baseline in a way that raised questions for the Parliamentarian. They passed a budget resolution bill with those changes on April 10, without waiting for MacDonough's ruling.

== Personal life ==
MacDonough lives in Arlington, Virginia. In autumn 2021, she had surgery for stage 3 breast cancer.

Government offices
Preceded by Alan Frumin	6th Parliamentarian of the United States Senate; 2012 – present	Incumbent
