= Yale Model Congress =

- Abbreviation: YMC
- Formation: 1993
- Type: Student organization
- Purpose: American politics
- Location: Yale University, New Haven, CT
- Official language: English
- President: Lukas Koutsoukos
- Vice President: Estelle Gerber
- Director of Delegations: Gabriella Tejada and Grace Grammatico
- Director of Operations: Daniel Mora

Yale Model Congress (YMC) is an entirely student-run Model Congress association. Founded in 1993, it is the second oldest conference of its kind in the Ivy League, after Harvard Model Congress, which was founded in 1986. Every year, it brings hundreds of delegates to Yale University in New Haven, Connecticut to simulate the United States Congress.

== Conference Information ==
Founded in 1993 by members of the Yale Political Union, Yale Model Congress is an annual, four-day-long event, now held in early December. During the conference, high school delegates participate in one of approximately thirty committees, chaired by Yale undergraduates. The delegates prepare bills prior to the conference, and each student is given the chance to debate his or her bill using a parliamentary system modeled off Robert’s Rules of Order. Each committee has between fifteen and twenty-five delegates, making YMC the most personal of the college Model Congress conferences.

Bills that pass through committee are eligible to be debated in one of six full sessions, which meet throughout the conference. Each full session is composed of five to six committees, and any delegate may move to consider any bill that passed through one of those committees. Debate in full sessions is somewhat more formal; rather than speaking around a seminar table in committee, delegates approach a podium to speak in full session. Awards are given to exceptional delegates, both at the committee and at the full session levels.

In addition to regular committees, Yale Model Congress also offers special programs, differently run committees for advanced delegates. In the past, special programs have included simulations of the Supreme Court, where students debate the constitutionality of passed legislation, and the Presidential Cabinet, where delegates respond to crises and advise the president on which bills to sign or veto.

Sessions are held in Yale classrooms, as well as in the Omni New Haven Hotel. Except for a few local schools, delegations spend the weekend staying at the Omni or the nearby New Haven Hotel.

Outside of committee, YMC offers students opportunities to visit Yale and New Haven, as well as hosting Yale Day, where students hear from Yale professors such as Paul Kennedy and Akhil Amar. On Saturday evening, YMC also hosts a delegate dance and a trivia night for participating students.

== Governance ==
Yale Model Congress is led by a president, a Yale undergraduate who is elected every spring. The president then appoints his or her Cabinet, which includes positions such as the director of legislation (responsible for compiling the delegates’ bills), the director of special programs, the director of operations (responsible for managing conference operations, security, and hotel contracts), and the director of New Haven Programs (responsible for outreach to New Haven public schools). Committee chairs are selected every fall from a pool of interested Yale students. Yale Model Congress is a 501(c)(3) non-profit organization.

== Intercollegiate competition ==
Penn Model Congress hosted the first Intercollegiate Model Congress competition in the United States from November 6 to 7, 2010. Members of the Yale Model Congress delegation won three of the five committees at the conference, thereby securing the first national championship in Intercollegiate Model Congress for Yale. This does not account for individual awards.

== Related ==
- Yale University
- Model Congress
- List of Yale University student organizations
- Yale Political Union
- Yale International Relations Association
