= Charles L. Watkins =

Parliamentarian of the United States Senate

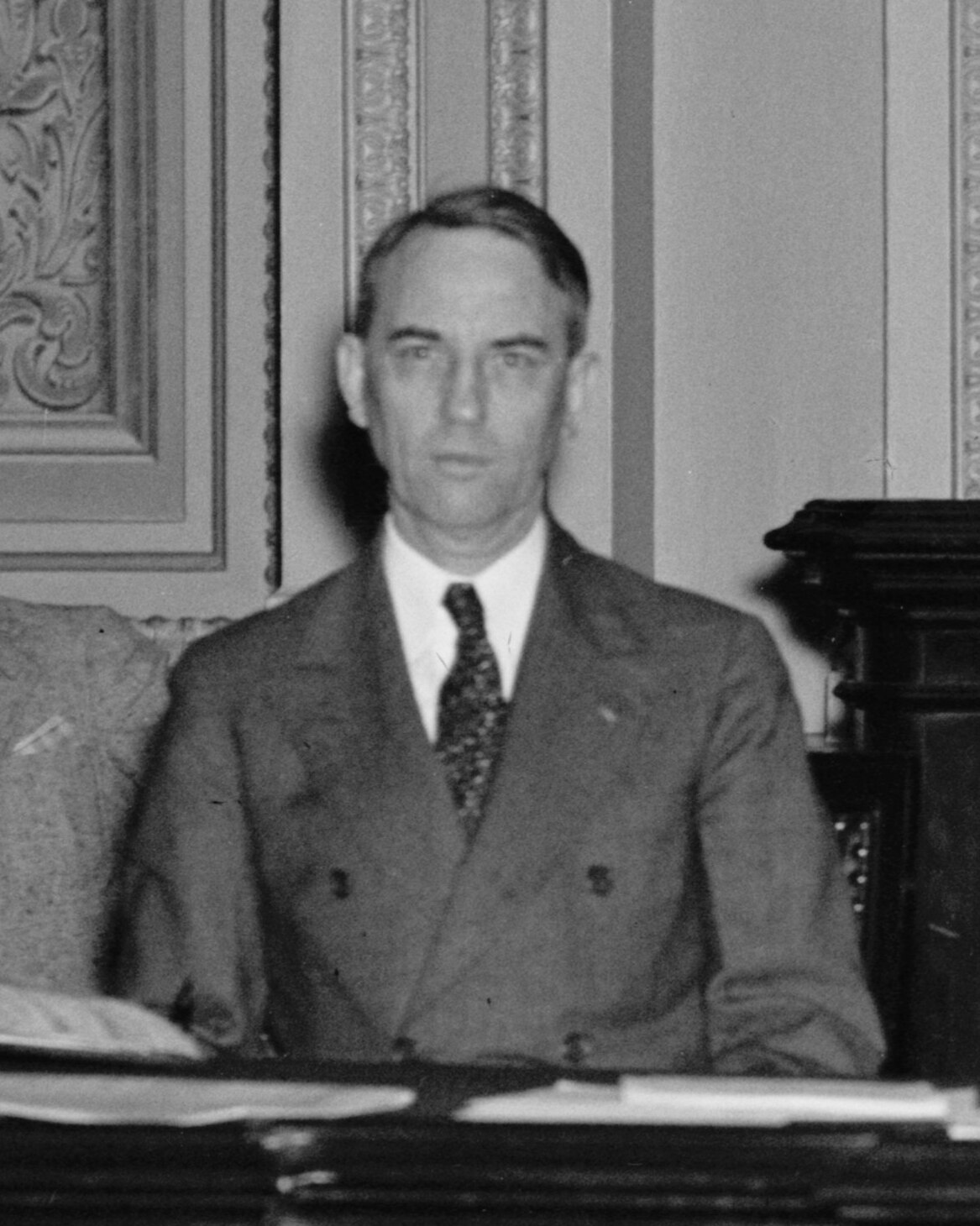
- Watkins in 1937

Parliamentarian of the United States Senate
- In office 1935–1964
- Succeeded by: Floyd M. Riddick

Personal details
- Born: August 10, 1879 Mount Ida, Arkansas
- Died: August 30, 1966 (aged 87) Bethesda, Maryland
- Education: University of Arkansas School of Law

Charles Lee Watkins (August 10, 1879 – August 30, 1966) was the first and longest-serving Parliamentarian of the United States Senate.

== Early life and education ==
Watkins was born on August 10, 1879, in Mount Ida, Arkansas. He attended the University of Arkansas School of Law.

== Career ==
Watkins started his career as a clerk in the offices of the Arkansas Attorney General and of the Governor of the State of Arkansas from 1899–1901. From 1902 through 1903, Watkins was the clerk of the commission created by the Arkansas General Assembly for the creation of the infrastructure and exhibits for the Arkansas portion of the centennial exposition of the Louisiana Purchase display at the 1904 World's Fair, held in St. Louis, Missouri.

In 1904, Watkins began working in the United States Senate as a stenographer. In 1919, after already transferring to and working on the Senate floor as a journal clerk, he began researching the Congressional Record for previous Senate rules decisions. In 1923, his career as the Senate Parliamentarian began in an unofficial manner. After periods of confusion and controversy, in 1935, the Senate created the Parliamentarian of the United States Senate and Watkins served as its first.

In 1964, after showing declining memory, and 60 years of service to the Senate, 85-year-old Watkins was replaced as Parliamentarian of the United States Senate.

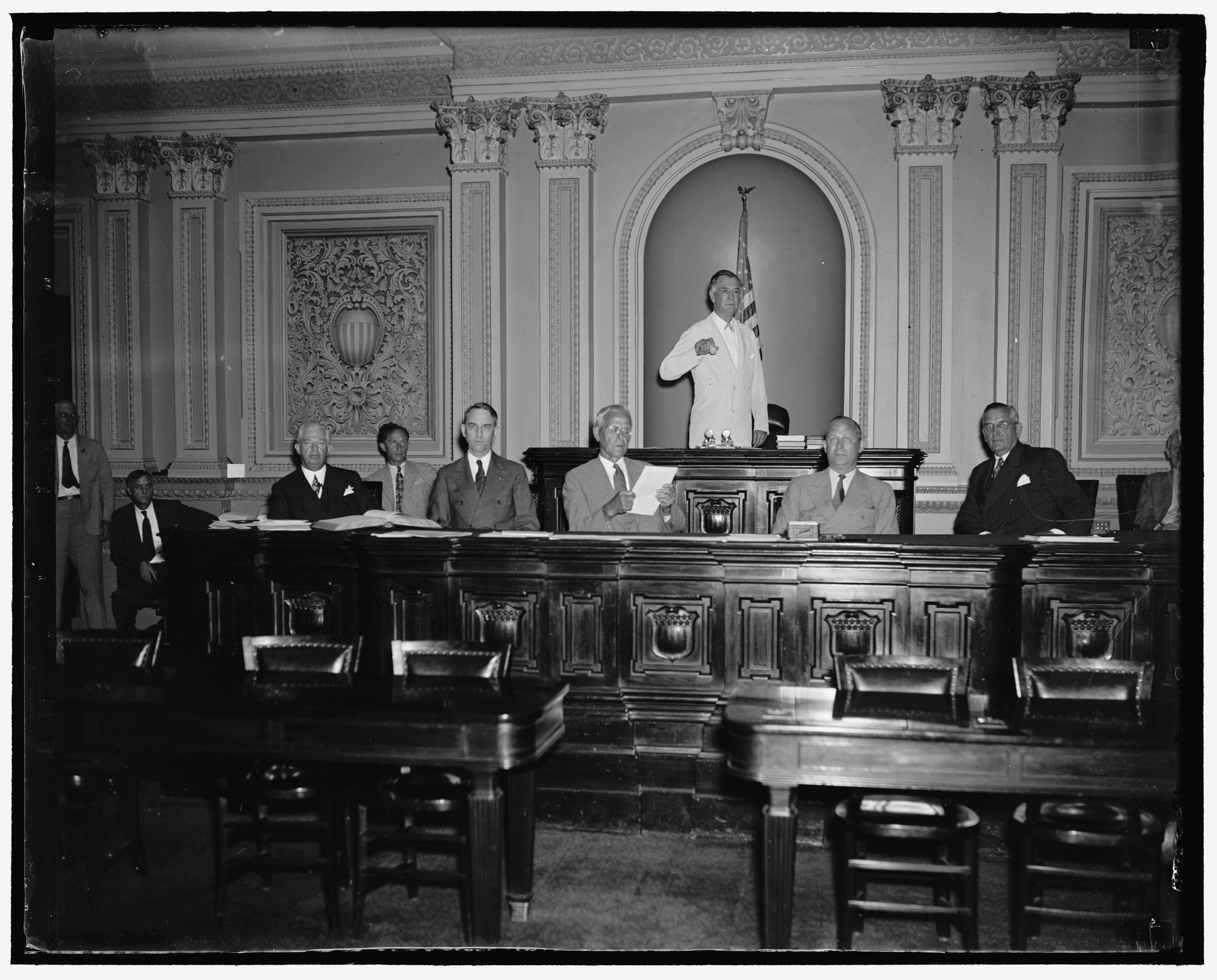
Left to right: Chesley W. Jurney, Sergeant at Arms; Leslie L. Biffle, Secretary to the Majority; Charles L. Watkins, Parliamentarian and Journal Clerk; John C. Crockett, Chief Clerk; Senator Key Pittman; Emery L. Frazier, Legislative Clerk; and Col. Edwin A. Halsey, Secretary. 6/14/37

== Personal life ==
Watkins married Martha Heard Walker in 1903 and they had one son. After Walker died, Watkins married Barbara Laura Sandmeier in 1944. Watkins died on August 30, 1966, in a Bethesda, Maryland, nursing home at the age of 87.

Government offices
Preceded by None	1st Parliamentarian of the United States Senate; 1935 – 1964	Succeeded by Floyd M. Riddick
