= Model Congress =

Model Congress gives students a chance to engage in a role-playing simulation of the United States Congress. Such events are hosted by the Congress itself, Rutgers University, American International College, University of Maryland, Columbia University, Princeton University, the University of Pennsylvania, Yale University, The College of William and Mary, Harvard, Maggie L. Walker Governor's School, Hamburg Area High School (Hamburg, Pennsylvania), and Northgate High school (Walnut Creek, California).

These simulations range in complexity from the government-sponsored Model United States House of Representatives, hosted on Capitol Hill and featuring six congressional committees to Harvard's simulation featuring both the House and Senate, various committees therein, the Supreme Court, and offshoots in San Francisco, Europe, the Middle East and Asia. North Carolina has a program similar to Model Congress called North Carolina Youth Legislative Assembly at the high school level and the North Carolina Student Legislature for the collegiate level, and Arkansas has one called the Arkansas Student Congress on Human Relations. The mock assembly models the North Carolina General Assembly and Arkansas General Assembly but also uses parliamentary procedure based on Robert's Rules of Order.

Awards are available for outstanding delegates, both in committee and in full session. Often, debaters call winning the highest award in a committee or full session "gaveling", and some exceptionally skilled debaters may "double gavel", or win the top award in both committee and full sessions.

American International College's Model Congress Program is the longest-running program of its kind in the United States.

Harvard Model Congress has held an annual conference in Boston since 1986 for over 1,700 high school students, staffed by over 200 Harvard undergraduate students. Harvard Model Congress also hosts annual conferences in Europe (since 1987), San Francisco (since 2001), Asia (since 2004), and the Middle East (since 2013). It is widely considered to be the nation's premier congressional simulation conference due to its quality programming and college staffers.

The University of Pennsylvania hosted an intercollegiate Model Congress conference on November 6–7, 2010. Yale University soon followed with a conference on April 23, 2011. The circuit is gradually expanding. World Youth Model Congress, organized by college and high school students from South Korea, is the first of its kind to be held in North-East Asia.

== High schools ==
=== History ===
In 1887, Shortridge High School's "Senate", a model congress featuring only one house, was founded by Laura Donnan. In it, students took the roles of real senators to debate the issues of their time. A majority of the senators were young women, and the Senate gave them a way to participate in the political world which would normally be closed to them. The club closed with the school in 1981.

The New Rochelle High School Model Congress Club is the longest running high school level model congress in the country. Model Congress originated at New Rochelle High School in 1964 when faculty advisor William P. Clarke sought an extracurricular outlet for bright students not engaged in sports. Richard Nixon was the guest speaker at the club's first mock presidential convention in 1964. Congressman Jamaal Bowman spoke briefly at the club's 58th annual conference at New Rochelle High School in 2022.

==== New York ====
Certain high schools in New York, specifically the Nassau County and Westchester County areas, participate in a competitive debate league known as United Model Congress (UMC). These nine schools get together 8 times during the school year and debate various pieces of mock legislation just as an actual legislative body would. The schools involved (also known as delegations) are:

- New Rochelle High School (Since 1964)
- Lawrence High School (Since 1969)
- Oceanside High School (Since 1974)
- Herricks High School (Since 1986)
- George W. Hewlett High School (Since 1987)
- Seaford High School (Since 1991)
- Wantagh High School (Since 1991)
- East Meadow High School (Since 1992)
- Long Beach High School (Since 1994)

Wantagh and Seaford compete as a joint delegation known as Tri-Delegation, often abbreviated as "Tri-D." Former members of this delegation are J.F. Kennedy and W.C. Mepham high schools of Bellmore-Merrick, and MacArthur High School of Levittown.

In March 2020, monthly foreign congresses were suspended due to the COVID-19 pandemic. The first congress to occur since the onset of the pandemic was Tri-D XXX, hosted by Wantagh High School on January 15, 2022.

Many high schools will often attend national model congress competitions at universities such as the University of Pennsylvania and Harvard University.

Students in the Model Congress Club at Maggie L. Walker Governor's School established an annual Model Congress conference known as Walker Model Congress. The first conference was in 2012 and has hosted several hundred delegates from high schools and middle schools nationwide. It is entirely student-led and run with a staff of approximately 100 people.

Choate Rosemary Hall in Wallingford, Connecticut commenced its 39th Model Congress on November 7, 2012, for students in its American Political Institutions course.

In addition to the aforementioned high schools, there are many more that compete in the annual competitions at various universities across the nation. Some of these schools include:

- Academy For Software Engineering
- Brearley School
- Columbia Grammar & Preparatory School
- Dalton School
- Great Neck North High School
- Great Neck South High School
- Horace Mann School
- Jericho High School
- Richard Montgomery High School
- Sanford H. Calhoun High School
- Spence School
- Syosset High School
- The Beacon School
- Trevor Day School
- Trinity School (New York City)
- West Windsor-Plainsboro High School South

== Intercollegiate ==
For many years, Model Congress was only limited to high school students to participate. In November 2010, the University of Pennsylvania hosted the first ever intercollegiate conference, followed by a conference by Yale University in April 2011. Penn and Yale followed with second conferences in 2011–2012, along with Columbia University and Trinity College. The intercollegiate circuit uses the same general rules as high school competitions held by host schools and is rapidly expanding as high school students seek an outlet to continue their participation in Model Congress while in college in ways other than hosting conferences for high school students.

== Online ==
Some iterations of a Model Congress exist online, such as on the website Reddit. Similar model governments exist on the service Discord.

Several House of Commons and historical versions of the United States Government also exist online, particularly on Reddit and Discord.

== Model United States Senate ==
Model United States Senate (MUSS) is a student event intended to simulate the legislative process of the United States Senate. Various educational bodies organize MUSS events. The first MUSS, predating the aforementioned intercollegiate Model Congresses by 40 years, is the Floyd M. Riddick Model United States Senate at Stetson University.

=== Floyd M. Riddick Model United States Senate at Stetson University ===
Stetson University hosts the Floyd M. Riddick Model U.S. Senate, the United States' first and oldest collegiate-level Model United States Senate program annually in Spring, around late March. The program was founded in 1970 by Dr. T. Wayne Bailey, political science professor, and then-political science student John Fraser, after he asked Dr. Bailey in class if it would be possible to create such a program inspired by the Model United Nations programs that Fraser had seen. Dr. Bailey embraced the idea, and that year, the first Model Senate was held. Republican Senate leader Howard Baker of Tennessee, who attended the first MUSS at the invitation by Dr. Bailey, connected Bailey with U.S. Senate Parliamentarian Dr. Floyd Millard Riddick. Dr. Riddick would go on to become Stetson's MUSS Parliamentarian, teaching students how to be U.S. senators, while also being the real U.S. Senate Parliamentarian every year until his retirement in 1974, due to his poor health preventing him from travelling. Upon his retirement, Stetson would officially name its MUSS program the "Floyd M. Riddick Model United States Senate."

Each year, students from colleges and universities around the nation gather at Stetson University for this three-day event. The F.M.R. Model U.S. Senate reproduces the actual procedures and activities of the United States Senate in an effort to provide experience and education for the student participants. Each student is assigned a Senator in one of five legislative committees (Armed Services, Foreign Relations, HELP, EPW or Judiciary) and is responsible for researching a variety of bills, crafting appropriate amendments and portraying the assigned senator as accurately as possible. Over the years, additional roles beyond that of a senator have come and gone. In 2007, there was a lobbyist role within committees, where students had to know their committee's bills and be a "go-to" expert for the Senators (they could also become a senator if the original student playing that specific role went absent). In 2013, a journalism role was introduced, which allowed students to live report about the event as well as play the role of real journalists and report on the Model Senate. Due to changes brought by time, as well as a two-year hiatus due to Covid-19 beginning in 2020 until the program's return in 2022 for the 50th Model Senate and a new benefactor, Attorney Patrick L. Smith, whom the event has been renamed after since 2022, these roles, while innovative for their time, are no longer available for students to play as.

Since Dr. Riddick's original involvement (and thanks to his leveraged connections as a U.S. Senate Parliamentarian), the F.M.R. Model U.S. Senate has always attracted national speakers and lecturers, including former and sitting United States senators. These include the likes of U.S. Senators Albert Gore Sr., Robert Byrd, Howard Baker, Charles Mathias, Lawton Chiles Jr., Joseph Biden, Paul Sarbanes, John Melcher, Thad Cochran, Nancy Kassebaum, William Bradley, Wyche Fowler, Bob Graham, Max Cleland (who is also a Stetson Alumnus), Bill Nelson, as well as U.S. Representatives E. Clay Shaw Jr. and John L. Mica.

=== DoDDS-Europe MUSS ===
A conference held in Wiesbaden, Germany every April for 4 days for high school students from all over DODDS Europe participate to simulate the United States Senate, lobby, pass bills, and generally learn about the legislative process that takes place in the United States Senate.

US Senate Seal

DoDDS-Europe MUSS is organized cooperatively by the teacher board and the appointed student board. The student board is typically composed of six students from six different schools. These six students and the teachers' advisory board usually meet in December to organize most of the conference including creating the theme, designing and ordering T-shirts, pens, folders, etc., setting debate topics and suggesting changes to the conference.

Every participating team and their coach is expected to arrive at the conference location at a specified time, most of the time between 8-10 pm. As the senators and lobbyists arrive they are told the time frame in which they are expected to lobby. Lobbyist represent interest groups, government agencies or any organization that wishes to push for a specific act or bill.

=== Goucher College Model United States Senate ===
A group of political science majors at Goucher College created the U.S. Model Senate program as an educational tool to improve high school students’ understanding of the legislative process in the American government and to encourage their political engagement. The current President of this club is William Jenkins. Each student will be assigned to play the role of a real U.S. Senator and will participate in a two-day model senate conference. Over these two days, students will participate in floor sessions, introduce legislation, mark up legislation in committee, and attend party caucuses. They will get a sense of what it is like to be a U.S. Senator and leave with a better understanding of the country's legislative system.

=== Other MUSS events ===
The Bridgewater State College Model United States Senate for High School.

== See also ==
- Harvard Model Congress
- Mock election
- Mock trial
- Model United Nations
- Yale Model Congress
- YMCA Youth and Government
