= Reconciliation (United States Congress) =

United States legislative process

Budget reconciliation is a special parliamentary procedure of the United States Congress set up to expedite the passage of certain federal budget legislation in the Senate. The procedure overrides the Senate's filibuster rules, which may otherwise require a 60-vote supermajority for passage. Bills described as reconciliation bills can pass the Senate by a simple majority of 51 votes or 50 votes plus the vice president's as the tie-breaker. The reconciliation procedure also applies to the House of Representatives, but it has minor significance there, as the rules of the House of Representatives do not have a de facto supermajority requirement. Because of greater polarization, gridlock, and filibustering in the Senate in recent years, budget reconciliation has come to play an important role in how the United States Congress legislates.

Budget reconciliation bills can deal with mandatory spending, revenue, and the federal debt limit, and the Senate can pass one bill per year affecting each subject. Congress can thus pass a maximum of three reconciliation bills per year, though in practice it has often passed a single reconciliation bill affecting both spending and revenue. Policy changes that are extraneous to the budget are limited by the Byrd rule, which also prohibits reconciliation bills from increasing the federal deficit after a ten-year period or making changes to Social Security. Reconciliation does not apply to discretionary spending, which is instead managed through the annual appropriations process.

The reconciliation process was created by the Congressional Budget Act of 1974 and was first used in 1980. Bills passed using the reconciliation process include the Consolidated Omnibus Budget Reconciliation Act of 1985, the Personal Responsibility and Work Opportunity Act of 1996, the Economic Growth and Tax Relief Reconciliation Act of 2001, the Health Care and Education Reconciliation Act of 2010, the Tax Cuts and Jobs Act of 2017, the American Rescue Plan Act of 2021, the Inflation Reduction Act of 2022, and the One Big Beautiful Bill Act.

== Process ==
=== Reconciliation process ===
Reconciliation is an optional part of the annual congressional budgetary process. Typically, the reconciliation process begins when the president submits a budget to Congress early in the calendar year. In response, each chamber of Congress begins a parallel budget process, starting in the Senate Budget Committee and the House Budget Committee. Each budget committee proposes a budget resolution setting spending targets for the upcoming fiscal year; in order to begin the reconciliation process, each house of Congress must pass identical budget resolutions that contain reconciliation instructions. Other committees then approve bills that meet the spending targets proposed by its respective budget committees, and these individual bills are consolidated into a single omnibus bill. Each house of Congress then begins consideration of its respective omnibus bills under its respective rules of debate.

The reconciliation process has a relatively minor impact in the House of Representatives, but it has important implications in the Senate. In contrast to most other legislation, senators cannot use the filibuster to indefinitely prevent consideration of a reconciliation bill, because Senate debate over reconciliation bills is limited to twenty hours. Thus, reconciliation bills only require the support of a simple majority of the Senate for passage, rather than the sixty-vote supermajority required to invoke cloture and defeat a filibuster. (Note: Reconciliation is not the only legislative process not subject to a Senate filibuster, but other processes, such as trade promotion authority, only apply in narrow circumstances.) Senators could theoretically prevent passage of a reconciliation bill by offering an unending series of amendments in a process colloquially known as a "vote-a-rama", (Note: The "Vote-a-Rama" does not conflict with the twenty hour limit on debate over reconciliation bills because that limit applies only to debate, and not to the process of voting on amendments.) but, unlike the modern filibuster, senators introducing these amendments must stand up and verbally offer the amendments.

Though the reconciliation process allows a bill to bypass the filibuster in the Senate, it does not affect other basic requirements for the passage of a bill, which are laid out in the Constitution's Presentment Clause. The House and Senate still must pass an identical bill and present that bill to the president. The president can sign the bill into law or veto it, and Congress can override the president's veto with a two-thirds majority vote in both houses of Congress.

=== Byrd Rule ===
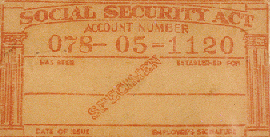
The Byrd Rule defines any reconciliation changes to Social Security as "extraneous"—and therefore ineligible for reconciliation.

The Byrd Rule, named for Senator Robert Byrd, was adopted in 1985 and amended in 1990. The Byrd Rule defines a provision to be "extraneous"—and therefore ineligible for reconciliation—in six cases:

1. If it does not produce a change in outlays or revenues;
2. If it produces an outlay increase or revenue decrease when the instructed committee is not in compliance with its instructions;
3. If it is outside the jurisdiction of the committee that submitted the title or provision for inclusion in the reconciliation measure;
4. If it produces a change in outlays or revenues which is merely incidental to the nonbudgetary components of the provision;
5. If it would increase the deficit for a fiscal year beyond those covered by the reconciliation measure (usually a period of ten years); (Note: Currently, the Byrd Rule prevents an increase in the deficit beyond a ten-year "budget window." Some members of Congress have proposed extending the budget window to 20 or more years.) or
6. If it recommends changes in Social Security.

The Byrd Rule does not prevent the inclusion of extraneous provisions, but relies on objecting senators to remove provisions by raising procedural objections. Any senator may raise a procedural objection to a provision believed to be extraneous ("Byrdable"), which will then be ruled on by the presiding officer, customarily on the advice of the Senate parliamentarian: a vote of sixty senators is required to overturn their ruling. While the vice president (as president of the Senate) can overrule the parliamentarian, as of 2010 this had not been done since 1975.

In 2001, Senate Majority Leader Trent Lott fired Parliamentarian Robert Dove after bipartisan dissatisfaction with his rulings, and replaced him with the previous Democratic appointee, Alan Frumin.

=== Other restrictions ===
Congress can pass up to three reconciliation bills per year, with each bill addressing the major topics of reconciliation: revenue, spending, and the federal debt limit. However, if Congress passes a reconciliation bill affecting more than one of those topics, it cannot pass another reconciliation bill later in the year affecting one of the topics addressed by the previous reconciliation bill. In practice, reconciliation bills have usually been passed once per year at most.

Other restrictions have also been applied to reconciliation. For example, from 2007 to 2011, Congress adopted a rule preventing reconciliation from being used to increase deficits.

== History ==
=== Origins ===
Because of growing concerns over deficits and presidential control of the budget process, many members of Congress sought to reform the congressional budgetary process in the early 1970s. Charles Schultze, a former director of the Bureau of the Budget, suggested a new process in which Congress would exercise greater control of the budget process by setting overall spending targets. Schultze proposed that Congress create a new type of legislation, the "final budget reconciliation bill," to ensure that the various budget-related bills passed by each congressional committee collectively fell within the overall spending targets passed by Congress. Schultze's ideas were adopted by Congress with the passage of the Congressional Budget Act of 1974, which established the reconciliation process, the Congressional Budget Office, and standing budget committees in the House and Senate. Under the original design of the Budget Act, reconciliation was expected to apply to revenue and spending within a single fiscal year.

Although reconciliation was originally understood to be for the purpose of either reducing deficits or increasing surpluses, the language of the 1974 act refers only to "changes" in revenue and spending amounts, not specifically to increases or decreases. Former parliamentarian of the Senate Robert Dove noted that in 1975 Senator Russell Long convinced the parliamentarian to protect a tax cut bill. That bill was vetoed by President Gerald Ford.

In the late 1970s, the process of reconciliation was largely ignored, in part because reconciliation could only be used during a brief window. In 1980, Congress amended the reconciliation process, allowing it to be used at the start of the budget process. Later that year, President Jimmy Carter signed the first budget bill passed using the reconciliation process; the bill contained about $8 billion in budget cuts.

=== Ronald Reagan ===
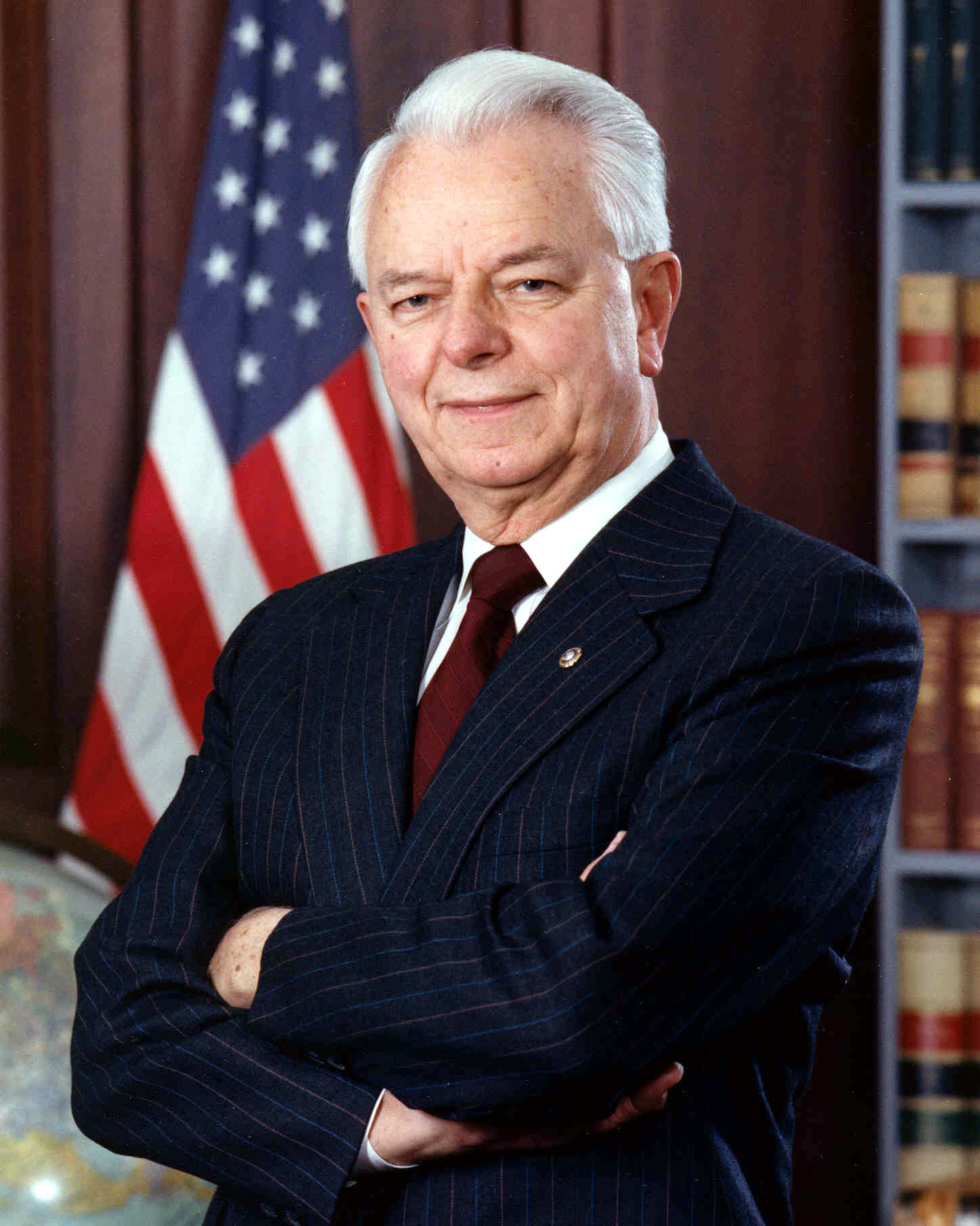
Senator Robert Byrd

Reconciliation emerged as an important legislative tool during the Reagan administration. A coalition of Republicans and conservative Democrats used the reconciliation process to pass the Omnibus Budget Reconciliation Act of 1981, which contained various spending cuts. In addition to bypassing the filibuster, the reconciliation process allowed Congress to pass these spending cuts through a budget resolution and a single reconciliation bill, rather than through the traditional method of passing several bills addressing each area of spending.

In the early 1980s, Congress passed reconciliation bills containing provisions that did not directly relate to the budget. For example, one reconciliation bill decreased the number of individuals on the Federal Communications Commission. In response, Senator Robert Byrd led passage of an amendment to strike "extraneous" amendments from reconciliation bills, and Congress permanently adopted the Byrd Rule in 1990. The reconciliation process remained an important tool of congressional majorities even after the passage of the Byrd Rule.

=== George H. W. Bush ===
During George H. W. Bush's presidency, it was used to pass the Omnibus Budget Reconciliation Act of 1990, which reduced federal spending and increased federal revenue.

=== Bill Clinton ===
After taking office in 1993, Democratic President Bill Clinton won passage of his proposed budget, the Omnibus Budget Reconciliation Act of 1993 through reconciliation. In 1996, he signed another major reconciliation bill, the Personal Responsibility and Work Opportunity Act of 1996. In 1997, Congress passed the Taxpayer Relief Act of 1997, a reconciliation bill that reduced taxes and increased the federal budget deficit. The tax cut bill was paired with the Balanced Budget Act of 1997, which reduced spending, and the two bills were signed into law by President Clinton.

In 1999, the Congress used reconciliation to pass the Taxpayer Refund and Relief Act of 1999, which represented the first time that the reconciliation process was used to increase deficits without a companion bill that reduced spending. It was vetoed by President Clinton. A similar situation happened in 2000, when the Senate again used reconciliation to pass the Marriage Tax Relief Reconciliation Act 2000, which was also vetoed by Clinton. At the time, the use of the reconciliation procedure to pass such bills was controversial.

=== George W. Bush ===
Upon taking office in 2001, Republican President George W. Bush sought the passage of major tax cuts, but his party controlled only a narrow majority in the Senate. To avoid a filibuster, Bush and his congressional allies used reconciliation to pass the Economic Growth and Tax Relief Reconciliation Act of 2001 and the Jobs and Growth Tax Relief Reconciliation Act of 2003, two major tax cut bills that reduced federal revenues. To comply with the Byrd Rule, the tax cuts contained sunset provisions, meaning that, absent further legislation, tax rates would return to their pre-2001 levels in 2011. Portions of the Bush tax cuts were made permanent through the American Taxpayer Relief Act of 2012, though some of the tax cuts for high earners were not extended.

=== Barack Obama ===
Democrats won control of the presidency and increased their control over Congress in the 2008 elections, and newly inaugurated President Barack Obama and his congressional allies focused on passing a major healthcare reform bill in the 111th Congress. The Senate passed a major healthcare bill in late 2009 without using the reconciliation process; because Democrats had a sixty-seat supermajority in the Senate, they were able to defeat Republican attempts to block the bill via the filibuster. While the House continued to debate its own healthcare bill, Democrats lost their sixty-seat supermajority in the Senate following the death of Ted Kennedy. (Note: Republican Scott Brown won a special election held to fill the vacancy caused by Kennedy's death.)

Following the loss of the Democratic supermajority in the Senate, House Democrats agreed to pass the Senate bill, while Senate Democrats agreed to use the reconciliation process to pass a second bill that would make various adjustments to the first bill. The original Senate bill was passed by the House and signed into law by President Obama as the Patient Protection and Affordable Care Act (ACA). Subsequently, the House and Senate used reconciliation to pass the Health Care and Education Reconciliation Act of 2010, which contained several alterations to the ACA. In 2016, Republicans passed a reconciliation bill to repeal parts of the ACA, but it was vetoed by President Obama.

=== Donald Trump (first term) ===
After gaining control of Congress and the presidency in the 2016 elections, Republicans sought to partially repeal the ACA and pass a major tax cut bill in the 115th United States Congress. As the party lacked a 60-vote supermajority in the Senate, they sought to implement both policies through separate reconciliation bills, with the healthcare bill passed using the reconciliation process for fiscal year 2017 and the tax cut bill passed using the reconciliation process for fiscal year 2018. Republicans were unable to pass their healthcare bill, the American Health Care Act of 2017, because three Senate Republicans and all Senate Democrats voted against it, preventing the bill from gaining majority support in the Senate.

With the defeat of their healthcare bill, congressional Republicans changed their focus to a separate reconciliation bill that would cut taxes. Both houses of Congress passed a tax cut bill in late 2017, though the Byrd Rule required the stripping of some provisions deemed extraneous. After both houses of Congress passed an identical tax cut bill, President Donald Trump signed the Tax Cuts and Jobs Act of 2017 into law in December 2017. Because of Byrd Rule restrictions, the individual tax cuts contained in the Tax Cuts and Jobs Act of 2017 were set to expire in 2026. Following the passage of the One Big Beautiful Bill Act in Trump's second term in July 2025, the tax cuts were made permanent.

=== Joe Biden ===
The American Rescue Plan was a $1.9 trillion economic stimulus package proposed by President Joe Biden to speed up the United States' recovery from the economic and health effects of the COVID-19 pandemic and the ongoing recession. He planned to pass it as one of his first bills into law through the 117th Congress. First proposed on January 14, 2021, the package built upon many of the measures in the CARES Act from March 2020 and in the Consolidated Appropriations Act, 2021 from December. The parliamentarian of the United States Senate ruled on February 21 that a provision calling for a $15 minimum wage increase in the American Rescue Plan could not be considered under Reconciliation because of the Byrd Rule. The bill was signed into law on March 11, 2021.

In April 2021, the Senate parliamentarian—an in-house rules expert—determined that the Senate can pass two budget reconciliation bills in 2021: one focused on fiscal year 2021 and one focused on fiscal year 2022. In addition, the Senate can pass additional budget reconciliation bills by describing them as a revised budget resolution that contains budget reconciliation instructions. However, the parliamentarian later clarified that the "auto-discharge" rule that allows a budget resolution to bypass a Budget Committee vote and be brought directly to the Senate floor does not apply to a revised budget resolution.

As a result of this ruling, a revised budget resolution would need to be approved by a majority vote of the Budget Committee before proceeding to the Senate floor, or deadlocked with a tied vote and then brought to the Senate floor via a motion to discharge. In a 50-50 Senate where committees are evenly divided between parties, this has the functional effect of requiring at least one member of the minority party on the Budget Committee to be present in order to provide a quorum for a vote. Considering the partisan nature of reconciliation legislation, it is highly unlikely that a member of the minority party will cooperate with the majority by providing a quorum on the committee, thus practically limiting the majority of a 50-50 tied Senate to one reconciliation bill per fiscal year.

=== Donald Trump (second term) ===
After gaining control of Congress and the presidency in the 2024 elections, Republicans sought to extend the 2017 tax cuts in the form of the One Big Beautiful Bill Act in the 119th United States Congress. With a narrow 51–50 vote in the Senate and a 218–214 vote in the House to agree to the Senate version of the bill, Trump signed the bill into law on July 4, 2025.

== List of reconciliation bills ==
The following bills have been enacted into law using reconciliation:

Bill	Link	Year	President
Omnibus Reconciliation Act of 1980	Pub. L. 96–499	1980	Jimmy Carter
Omnibus Budget Reconciliation Act of 1981	Pub. L. 97–35	1981	Ronald Reagan
Omnibus Budget Reconciliation Act of 1982	Pub. L. 97–253	1982	Ronald Reagan
Tax Equity and Fiscal Responsibility Act of 1982 (TEFRA)	Pub. L. 97–248	1982	Ronald Reagan
Omnibus Budget Reconciliation Act of 1983	Pub. L. 98–270	1984	Ronald Reagan
Consolidated Omnibus Budget Reconciliation Act of 1985 (COBRA)	Pub. L. 99–272	1986	Ronald Reagan
Omnibus Budget Reconciliation Act of 1986	Pub. L. 99–509	1986	Ronald Reagan
Omnibus Budget Reconciliation Act of 1987	Pub. L. 100–203	1987	Ronald Reagan
Omnibus Budget Reconciliation Act of 1989	Pub. L. 101–239	1989	George H. W. Bush
Omnibus Budget Reconciliation Act of 1990	Pub. L. 101–508	1990	George H. W. Bush
Omnibus Budget Reconciliation Act of 1993	Pub. L. 103–66	1993	Bill Clinton
Personal Responsibility and Work Opportunity Act	Pub. L. 104–193 (text) (PDF)	1996	Bill Clinton
Balanced Budget Act of 1997	Pub. L. 105–33 (text) (PDF)	1997	Bill Clinton
Taxpayer Relief Act of 1997	Pub. L. 105–34 (text) (PDF)	1997	Bill Clinton
Economic Growth and Tax Relief Reconciliation Act of 2001 (EGTRRA)	Pub. L. 107–16 (text) (PDF)	2001	George W. Bush
Jobs and Growth Tax Relief Reconciliation Act of 2003	Pub. L. 108–27 (text) (PDF)	2003	George W. Bush
Deficit Reduction Act of 2005	Pub. L. 109–171 (text) (PDF)	2006	George W. Bush
Tax Increase Prevention and Reconciliation Act of 2005 (TIPRA)	Pub. L. 109–222 (text) (PDF)	2006	George W. Bush
College Cost Reduction and Access Act of 2007	Pub. L. 110–84 (text) (PDF)	2007	George W. Bush
Health Care and Education Reconciliation Act of 2010	Pub. L. 111–152 (text) (PDF)	2010	Barack Obama
Tax Cuts and Jobs Act of 2017	Pub. L. 115–97 (text) (PDF)	2017	Donald Trump
American Rescue Plan Act of 2021	Pub. L. 117–2 (text) (PDF)	2021	Joe Biden
Inflation Reduction Act of 2022	Pub. L. 117–169 (text) (PDF)	2022	Joe Biden
One Big Beautiful Bill Act	Pub. L. 119–21 (text) (PDF)	2025	Donald Trump
Secure America Act	Pub. L. 119–98 (menu; GPO has not yet published law)	2026	Donald Trump

Since 1980, four reconciliation bills have passed Congress but were vetoed by the president:

Bill	Link	Year	President
Balanced Budget Act of 1995	H.R. 2491	1995	Bill Clinton
Taxpayer Refund and Relief Act of 1999	H.R. 2488	1999	Bill Clinton
Marriage Tax Relief Reconciliation Act of 2000	H.R. 4810	2000	Bill Clinton
Restoring Americans' Healthcare Freedom Reconciliation Act of 2015	H.R. 3762	2015	Barack Obama

== See also ==
- Congressional Budget and Impoundment Control Act of 1974
- Filibuster in the United States
- Nuclear option
