= Parliamentarian of the United States Senate =

Official advisor on parliamentary procedure

- Seal of the United States Senate

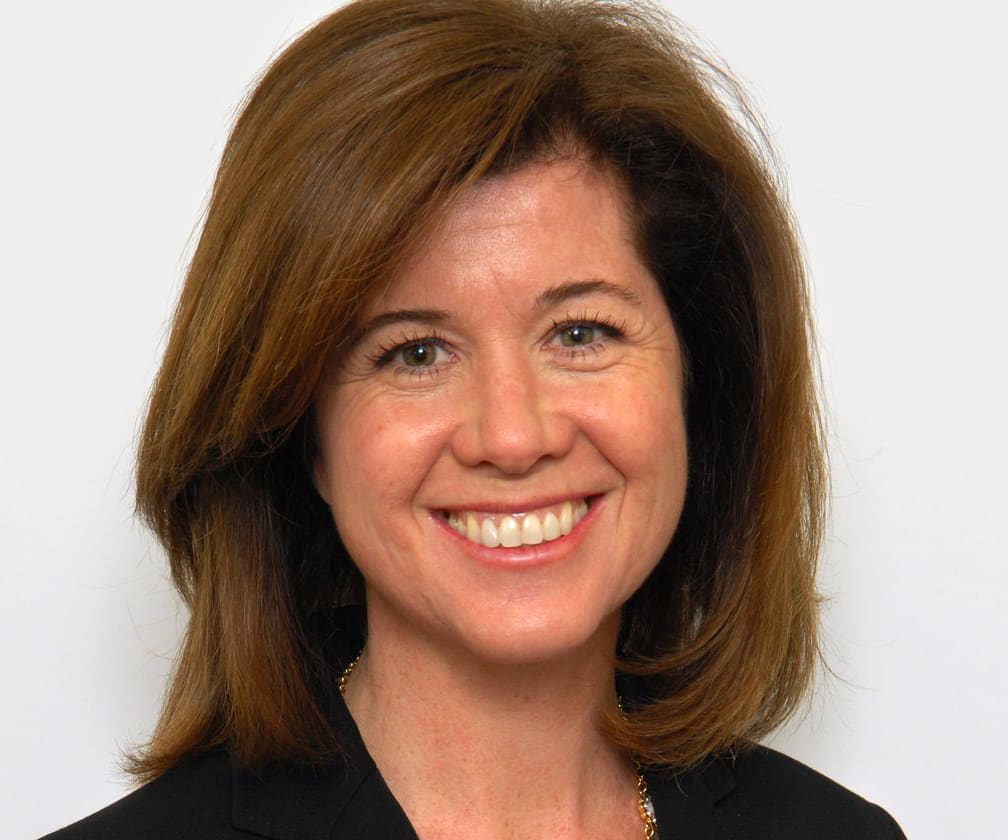
- Incumbent; Elizabeth MacDonough since 2012
- United States Senate
- Type: Parliamentarian
- Member of: Senate Dais
- Appointer: Senate Majority Leader
- Term length: Serves at the pleasure of the majority leader
- Constituting instrument: Standing Rules of the United States Senate
- Formation: 1935
- First holder: Charles L. Watkins
- Salary: $216,591.63

The parliamentarian of the United States Senate is the official advisor to the United States Senate on the interpretation of Standing Rules of the United States Senate and parliamentary procedure. Incumbent parliamentarian Elizabeth MacDonough has held the office since 2012, appointed by then-Senate majority leader Harry Reid.

As the presiding officer of the Senate may not be, and usually is not, aware of the parliamentary situation currently facing the Senate, a parliamentary staff sits second from the left on the Senate dais to advise the presiding officer on how to respond to inquiries and motions from senators (including "the Sergeant at Arms will restore order in the gallery"). The role of the parliamentary staff is advisory, and the presiding officer of the Senate may overrule the advice of the parliamentarian. In practice, this is rare; the most recent example of a vice president (as president of the Senate) overruling the parliamentarian was Nelson Rockefeller in 1975. That ruling was extremely controversial, to such an extent that the leaders of both parties immediately met and agreed that they did not want this precedent to stand, so the next week the Senate altered the rule under consideration via standard procedure. The Senate majority leader may also fire the parliamentarian, as occurred in 2001 during a dispute between parliamentarian Robert Dove and Majority Leader Trent Lott.

== Overview ==
An important role of the parliamentarian is to decide what can and cannot be done under the Senate's budget reconciliation process under the provisions of the Byrd Rule. These rulings are important because they allow certain bills to be approved by a simple majority, instead of the sixty votes needed to end debate and overcome a filibuster.

The office also refers bills to appropriate committees on behalf of the Senate's presiding officer, and referees efforts by the ruling party to change the Senate rules by rulings from the chair. The parliamentarian is appointed by and serves at the pleasure of the Senate majority leader. Traditionally, the parliamentarian is chosen from senior staff in the parliamentarian office, which helps ensure consistency in the application of the Senate's complex rules. The last three parliamentarians have served under both Republican and Democratic Senate leaders.

The parliamentarian's salary was $216,591.63 for the 2024 fiscal year, which ran through September 2024.

== List of parliamentarians ==
The following individuals have served as Senate parliamentarian:

No.	Image	Parliamentarian	Term	Notes
1		Charles L. Watkins	1935–1964	
2		Floyd M. Riddick	1964–1974	
3		Murray Zweben	1974–1981	
4		Robert Dove	1981–1987	
5		Alan Frumin	1987–1995	
6		Robert Dove	1995–2001	
7		Alan Frumin	2001–2012	
8		Elizabeth MacDonough	2012–present	

There have only been six Senate parliamentarians since the role was founded, with Dove and Frumin each serving two non-consecutive terms. MacDonough is the only woman to hold the role.

== See also ==
- Parliamentarian of the United States House of Representatives
