= National Association of Parliamentarians =

- Abbreviation: NAP
- Formation: 1930
- Type: 501(c)(3) non-profit corporation
- Purpose: "educating leaders throughout the world in effective meeting management through the use of parliamentary procedure"
- Headquarters: 213 South Main Street, Independence, Missouri, United States
- Official language: English
- Website: parliamentarians.org

The National Association of Parliamentarians (NAP) is an organization with membership predominantly in the United States that says that it provides services and products to help its members and others to learn how to proceed with and manage meetings of assemblies such as school boards, homeowners associations, church boards, and volunteer organizations. It also provides education and accreditation for parliamentarians who provide services to these types of organizations.

NAP headquarters in Independence, Missouri

NAP was organized in 1930 and has members throughout the U.S. and in Ontario, Canada who actively study and practice parliamentary procedure in civic, charitable, community, faith-based organizations, business and professional associations, and government entities. NAP also offers a certification program for those who are actively providing professional parliamentary consulting services to others.

== Membership ==
NAP has several levels of membership:

Regular member
A person who has passed the membership examination covering basic information on parliamentary procedure.
Registered Parliamentarian (RP)
A member who has passed an extensive test on parliamentary procedure.
Professional Registered Parliamentarian (PRP)
A registered parliamentarian who has successfully completed the Professional Qualifying Examination, demonstrating knowledge and proficiency in applying parliamentary procedure in the conduct of meetings of all sizes, in writing and interpreting bylaws, in providing parliamentary opinions, in teaching parliamentary procedure, and in serving organizations in other areas of parliamentary procedure and practice.
Retired Professional Registered Parliamentarian (RPRP)
A Professional Registered Parliamentarian (PRP) who has officially retired (as opposed to simply not renewed PRP status).

== Publications ==
- National Parliamentarian – a quarterly publication of NAP which includes articles on parliamentary procedure, and NAP news and current events.
