= Procedural officers and senior officials of the Parliament of Canada =

The procedural officers and senior officials of the Parliament of Canada are responsible for the administration of the Senate and the House of Commons.

== Senate ==
- Clerk of the Senate and Clerk of the Parliaments
- Deputy Clerk of the Senate of Canada
- Law Clerk and Parliamentary Counsel of the Senate of Canada
- Usher of the Black Rod of the Senate of Canada
- Senate Ethics Officer

== House of Commons ==
- Clerk of the House of Commons
- Deputy Clerk of the House of Commons
- Clerk Assistant
- Law Clerk and Parliamentary Counsel
- Sergeant-at-Arms

== Library of Parliament ==
The Parliamentary Librarian is an officer of the parliament of Canada and in charge of the library on Parliament Hill.

== See also ==
- Great Officer of State
