= William C. Corbett =

Clerk of the House of Commons of Canada from 2000 to 2005

11th Clerk of the House of Commons of Canada
- In office 2000–2005
- Preceded by: Robert Marleau
- Succeeded by: Audrey O'Brien

3rd Deputy Clerk of the House of Commons of Canada
- In office 1999
- Clerk: Robert Marleau
- Preceded by: Camille Montpetit
- Succeeded by: Audrey O'Brien

Clerk Assistant of the House of Commons of Canada
- In office 1997–1999 Serving with Audrey O'Brien
- Clerk: Robert Marleau

Personal details
- Born: November 30, 1944
- Died: May 3, 2010 (aged 65)

William Charles "Bill" Corbett was the 11th Clerk of the House of Commons of Canada, having served from 2000 to 2005.
