= Eugene Goodman =

American police officer (born 1980)

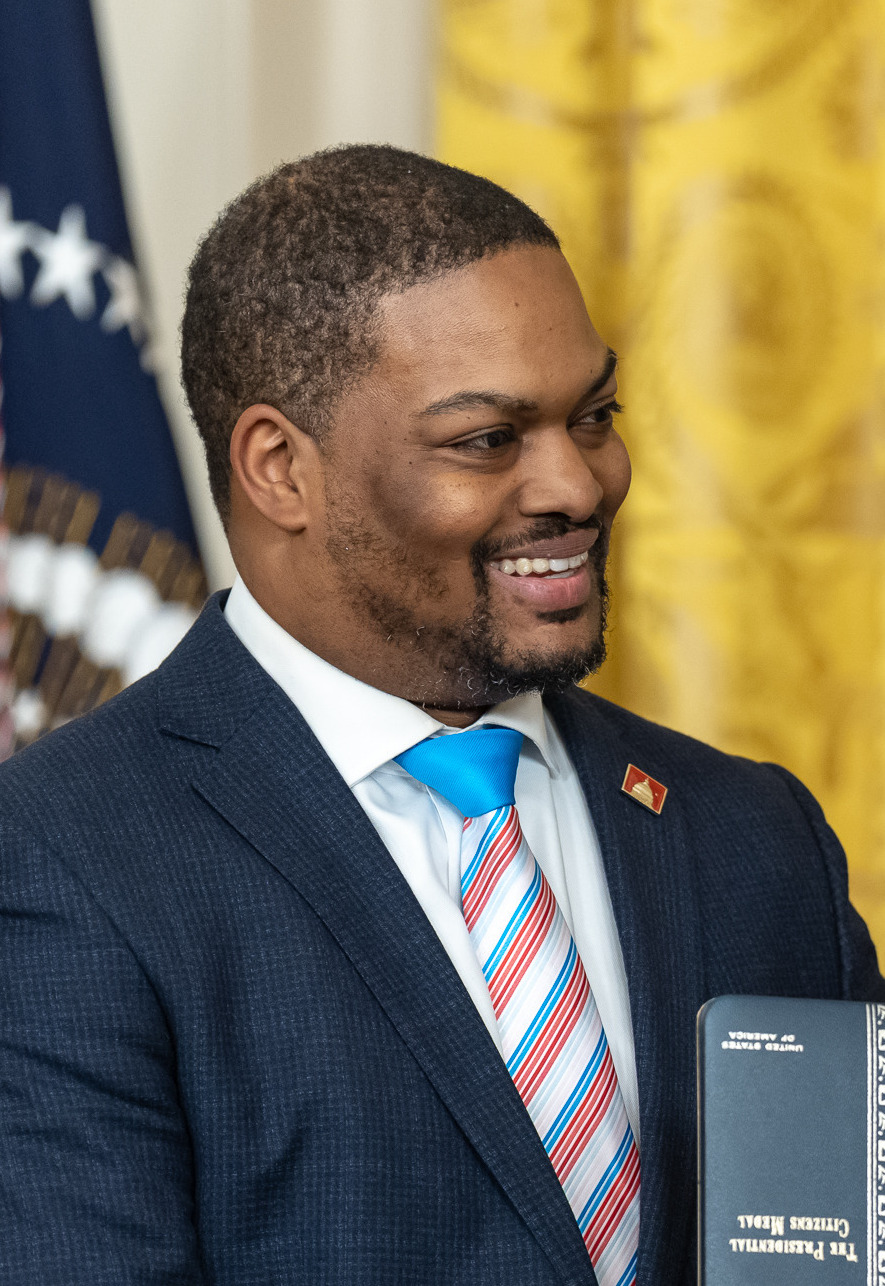
- Goodman in 2023

Deputy Sergeant at Arms of the United States Senate
- Acting; January 20, 2021 – March 2, 2021
- Sergeant at Arms: Jennifer Hemingway (acting)
- Preceded by: Jennifer Hemingway
- Succeeded by: Kelly Fado

Personal details
- Born: 1980 (age 45–46)
- Occupation: Law enforcement officer
- Known for: January 6 United States Capitol attack
- Awards: Presidential Citizens Medal (2023); Distinguished Public Service Medal (2023)
- Police career
- Department: United States Capitol Police
- Service years: 2009–present
- Military career
- Allegiance: United States
- Branch: United States Army
- Service years: 2002–2006
- Rank: Sergeant
- Unit: 101st Airborne Division
- Conflicts: Iraq War

Eugene Goodman (born 1980) is an American United States Capitol Police officer who diverted invading rioters from the United States Senate chamber during the January 6 Capitol attack. Goodman is a U.S. Army veteran who served during the Iraq War. He served as the Acting Deputy Sergeant at Arms of the United States Senate from January 20, 2021, to March 2, 2021.

On February 12, 2021, the Senate adopted a resolution awarding Goodman the Congressional Gold Medal, a resolution that died in the 117th Congress and never passed the House of Representatives. On January 6, 2023, President Joe Biden awarded him the Presidential Citizens Medal.

== Early life and military service ==
Goodman was born in 1980 and raised in the southeast section of Washington, D.C.

He served from 2002 to 2006 in the United States Army, including in combat with the 101st Airborne Division in the Iraq War. As a sergeant deployed to Iraq in 2005, Goodman led a 10-man squad in the Sunni triangle area that conducted patrols and identified improvised explosive devices requiring detonation. He was described by members of his military company as "calm, cool, and collected".

Goodman left the military in 2006. By 2009, he was a member of the U.S. Capitol Police.

== Response to the January 6 Capitol attack ==
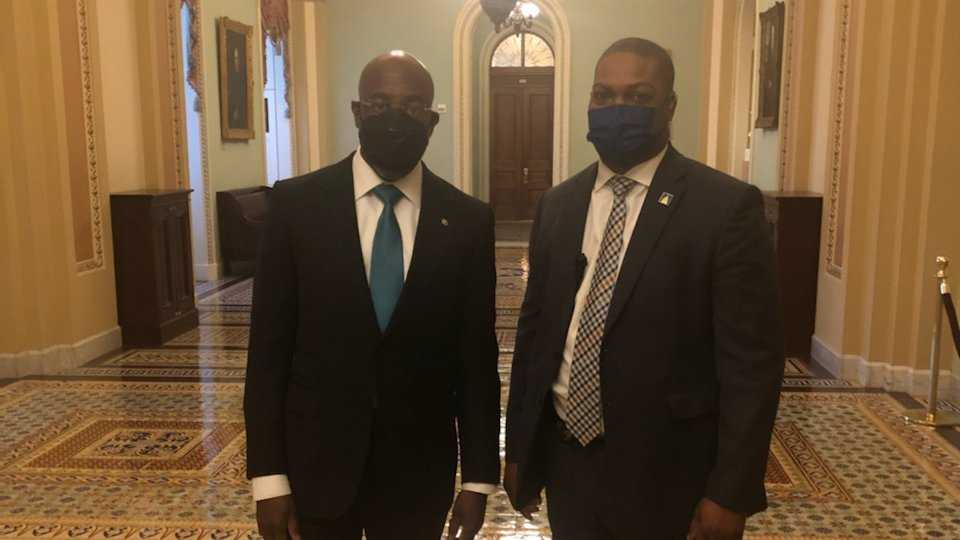
Senator Raphael Warnock tweeted on January 22, 2021, that he was honored to meet ("a true American hero") Goodman (right) and posted this photo of them taken by Senator Jon Ossoff two days after both new Georgia senators were sworn into office.

On January 6, 2021, supporters of Donald Trump breached the United States Capitol building when, unaccompanied by other officers, Goodman confronted them. He has been cited for heroism in baiting and diverting the insurrectionists away from the Senate chamber in the minutes before the chamber could be safely evacuated. As the crowd of insurrectionists reached a landing from which there was an unimpeded path to the chamber, Goodman pushed the lead person, Doug Jensen, and then deliberately retreated away from the chamber, enticing the crowd to chase him in another direction. One media report described his actions as follows:

In short, he tricked them, willingly becoming the rabbit to their wolf pack, pulling them away from the chambers where armed officers were waiting, avoiding tragedy and saving lives. Lives which include their own.

Those present at the time of the event, including Democratic and Republican legislators and members of the press, praised Goodman for his quick thinking and brave actions. Republican Senator Ben Sasse credited Goodman with having "single-handedly prevented untold bloodshed".

Goodman's former unit, the XVIII Airborne Corps, issued a statement shortly after the riot, commending his valor and saying that he "was a hero long before last Wednesday".

Goodman's actions were captured in video footage taken by HuffPost reporter Igor Bobic. Bobic's footage of Goodman went viral on the internet, receiving more than 10 million views. A second video of Goodman's confrontation with the crowd was published by ProPublica on January 15.

Goodman's actions have been credited with saving the lives of those who remained in the chambers of Congress, those in the hallways who were attempting to evacuate, and the rioters themselves, who might otherwise have drawn forceful responses as with Ashli Babbitt, the woman who was shot while approaching the House chamber.

A video released on February 10, 2021, during the second impeachment trial of Donald Trump, showed Goodman leading Utah Senator Mitt Romney away from approaching rioters during the January 6 attack. Romney later stated he did not know how close he was and he did not know it was Goodman who diverted him away from the rioters but he looked forward to thanking Goodman.

== Honors ==
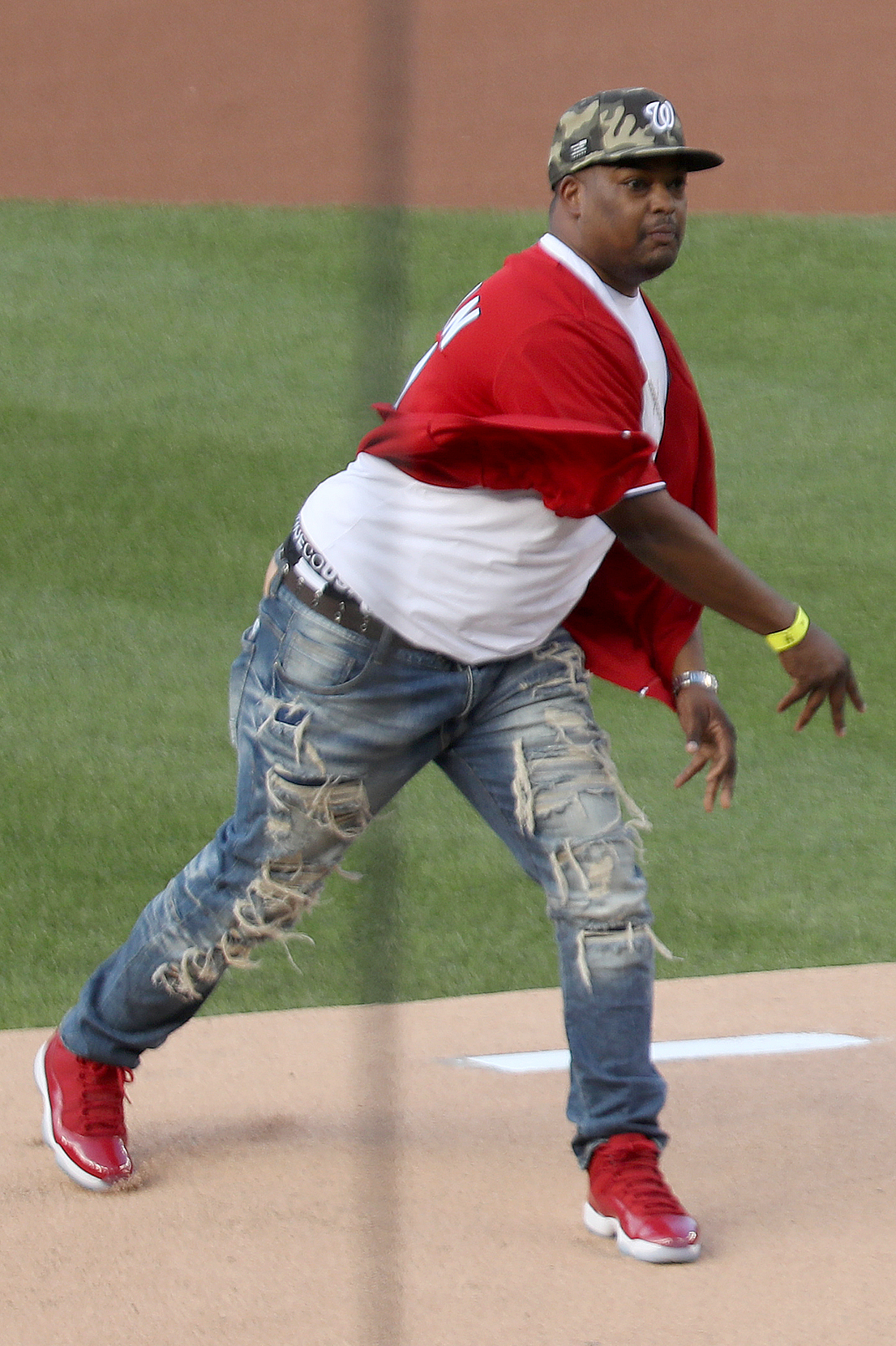
Goodman was honored at a Washington Nationals baseball game by being invited to throw the first pitch.

Following the attack on the Capitol, Jaime Harrison and others called for Goodman to be awarded the Congressional Gold Medal. A bipartisan resolution (H.Res.305) was introduced on January 13, 2021, by Representatives Charlie Crist (D-FL), Emanuel Cleaver (D-MO), and Nancy Mace (R-SC) to award the medal to Goodman.

Rep. Cleaver, one of the three original co-sponsors of the bill, wrote that, "[i]f not for the quick, decisive, and heroic actions from Officer Goodman, the tragedy of last week's insurrection could have multiplied in magnitude to levels never before seen in American history. With this prestigious award, we can show our gratitude to Officer Goodman for saving countless lives and defending our democracy."

Goodman also was awarded the Distinguished Public Service Award by both the secretary and chief of staff of the U.S. Army.

In addition, online petitions at Care2 and Change.org to award the Presidential Medal of Freedom to Goodman had received more than 83,500 signatures as of January 21, 2021. Following the event, Goodman said he was not looking for any accolades and expressed concern about potentially being targeted by extremists, but he insisted that he would "do the same thing again".

On January 20, 2021, Goodman escorted Kamala Harris to her inauguration as the Vice President of the United States. He was announced as the Acting Deputy Sergeant at Arms of the United States Senate; when stepping out onto the inauguration platform ahead of Harris, he received a standing ovation and cheers from those attending the ceremony.

=== Medals ===
- Meritorious Civilian Service Award, 2021
- Presidential Citizens Medal, 2023

On February 12, 2021, the U.S. Senate voted by unanimous consent to bestow the Congressional Gold Medal on Eugene Goodman. He had been invited to attend the proceedings and was present in the Senate Chamber for the vote, at which time, Goodman received a standing ovation from the members. On August 5, 2021, both chambers passed a concurrent resolution to award the Congressional Gold Medal to "The United States Capitol Police and those who protected the U.S. Capitol on January 6, 2021," without specific reference to Goodman. No action was ever taken in the House of Representatives to agree to the Senate's resolution awarding Goodman an individual Congressional Gold Medal as both chambers must pass the bill for an award to be conferred.

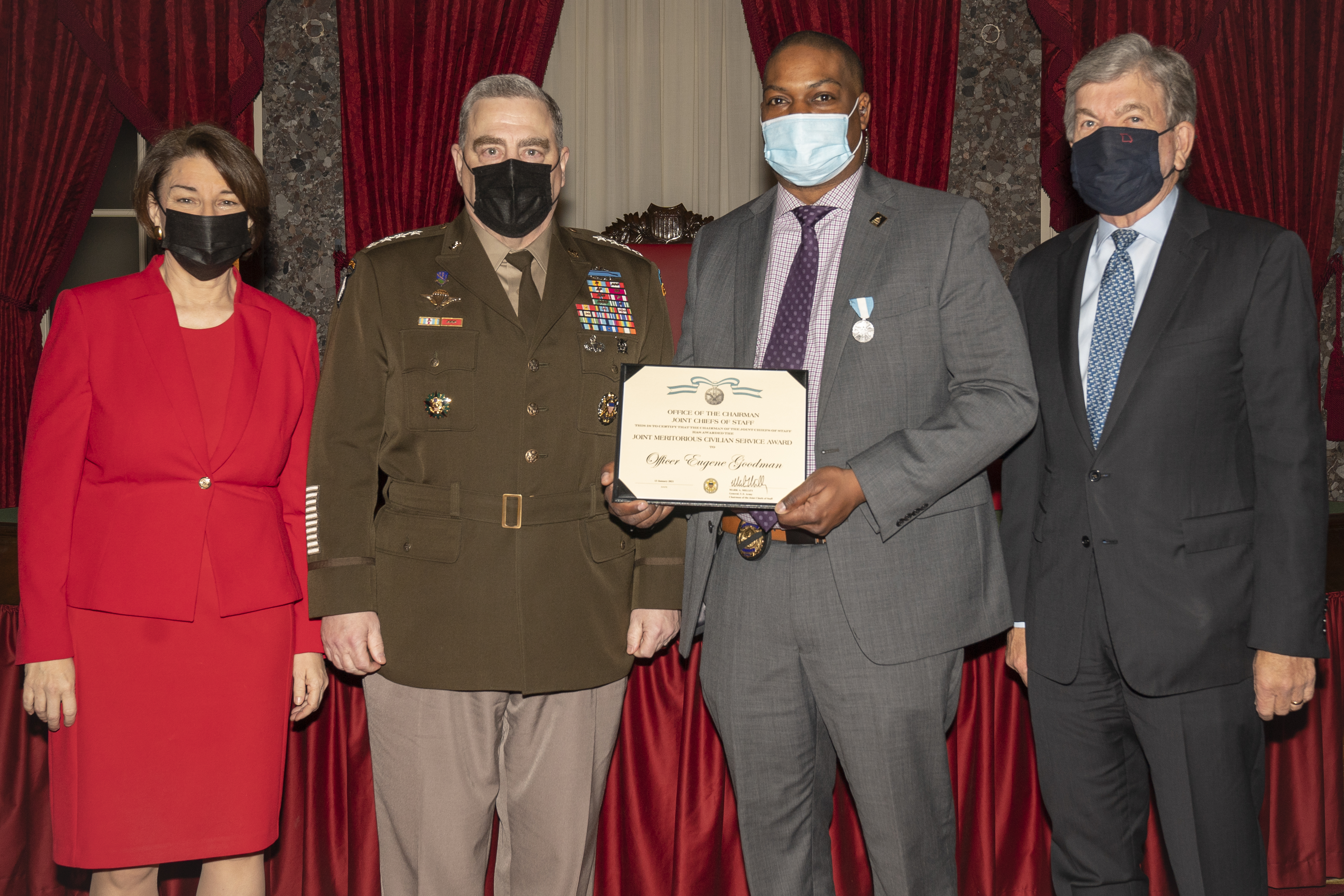
Goodman receives the Joint Meritorious Civilian Service Award (from left: Senator Amy Klobuchar, Chairman of the Joint Chiefs of Staff Mark Milley, Goodman, and Senator Roy Blunt).

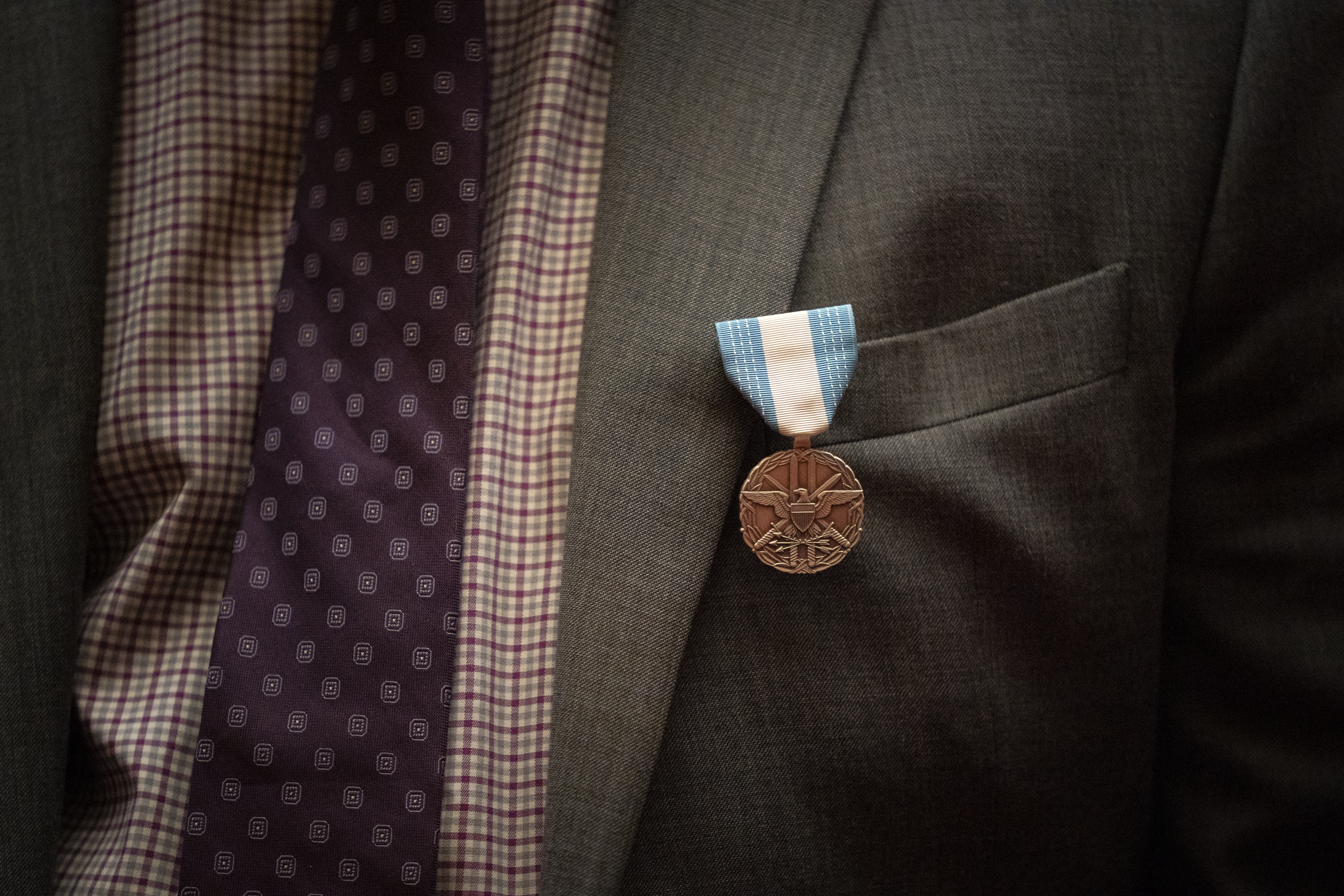
Goodman's Meritorious Civilian Service Award.

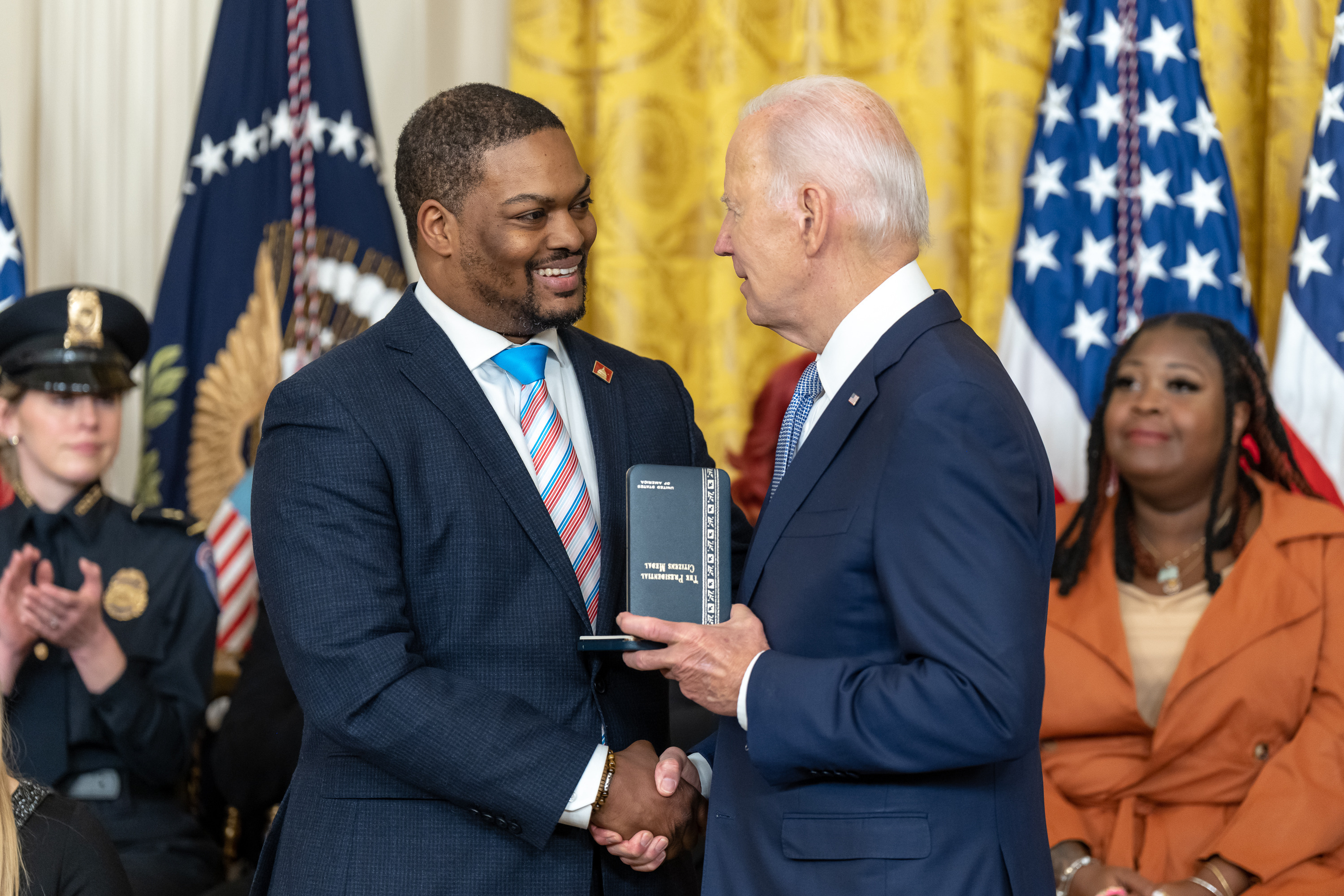
President Biden presents the Presidential Citizens Medal to Goodman during a ceremony on 6 January 2023 in the East Room of the White House.

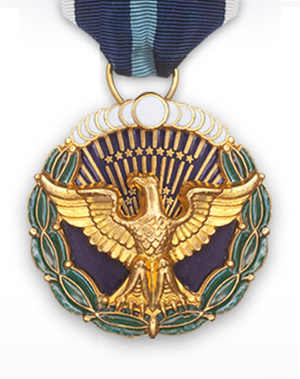
Presidential Citizens Medal.

== See also ==
- Kevin Vickers – Canadian politician and former Sergeant-at-Arms of the Canadian House of Commons who helped stop the 2014 shootings at Parliament Hill, Ottawa
