= Alistair Fraser =

Canadian politician

The Honourable Alistair Fraser MC QC

21st Lieutenant Governor of Nova Scotia
- In office September 1, 1952 – January 15, 1958
- Monarch: Elizabeth II
- Governor General: Vincent Massey
- Premier: Angus Lewis Macdonald; Harold Connolly; Henry Hicks; Robert Stanfield
- Preceded by: John Alexander Douglas McCurdy
- Succeeded by: Edward Chester Plow

Personal details
- Born: March 15, 1885 New Glasgow, Nova Scotia
- Died: January 24, 1964 (aged 78) New Glasgow, Nova Scotia
- Spouse(s): Jane Ross Fraser, daughter of James Hamilton Ross
- Relations: Duncan Cameron Fraser (father); Margaret Marjory Fraser (sister)
- Children: Alistair Fraser; Ian Fraser; Duncan Fraser
- Education: Dalhousie Law School
- Occupation: Lawyer
- Profession: Counsel

Alistair Fraser MC QC (March 15, 1885 – January 24, 1964) was the 21st Lieutenant Governor of Nova Scotia, from 1952 to 1958.

Fraser was born in New Glasgow, Nova Scotia. His father, Duncan Cameron Fraser, served as Nova Scotia's lieutenant-governor from 1906 to 1910 and had also been a Member of Parliament and a judge on the province's supreme court. He married Jane Ross, the daughter of James Hamilton Ross.

He graduated from Dalhousie Law School in 1908, was called to the bar in 1911, and was named King's Counsel in 1921. After his death, a fund was established by his estate to provide a scholarship in his name to the Dalhousie Faculty of Law. Fraser practised law in both eastern and western Canada until the outbreak of World War I when he enlisted in the Canadian Expeditionary Force and was sent overseas. He received two field promotions and was awarded the Military Cross following the Battle of Vimy Ridge. During the war Fraser was appointed aide de camp to General Sir Arthur Currie, commander of the Canadian Corps.

After being demobilized in 1919, he joined the Canadian National Railway as a general solicitor. He was promoted to commission counsel in 1923, assistant general counsel in 1929 and then vice-president of the traffic department. He held that position until his retirement in 1951. He was appointed viceroy of Nova Scotia the following year.

As lieutenant governor, Fraser officiated over the opening of the Canso Causeway. In 1963, he was awarded $560,000 by the Supreme Court of Canada for 10,000,000 tons of granite taken from his property for use in the construction of the link between Cape Breton and the Nova Scotia mainland. Fraser sued after the federal government only offered him $5,500 in compensation.

Fraser's son, also named Alistair Fraser (1923–1997), served as executive assistant to federal cabinet minister Jack Pickersgill in the 1960s and then served as Clerk of the Canadian House of Commons from 1967 to 1979.
