= Montpetit =

Montpetit is a French Canadian surname. Notable people with the surname include:

- Alain Montpetit (1950–1987), Canadian television and radio personality in Quebec
- Camille Montpetit, Canadian civil servant
- Édouard Montpetit (1881–1954), Canadian lawyer, economist and academic from Quebec
- Jacqueline Montpetit, Canadian politician from Quebec
- Marie Montpetit (born 1979), Canadian politician from Quebec
- Pascale Montpetit (born 1960), Canadian actress
- Richard Montpetit (born 1939), Canadian gymnast
- Sara Montpetit, Canadian actress and environmental activist from Quebec
