= Canada–Ireland relations =

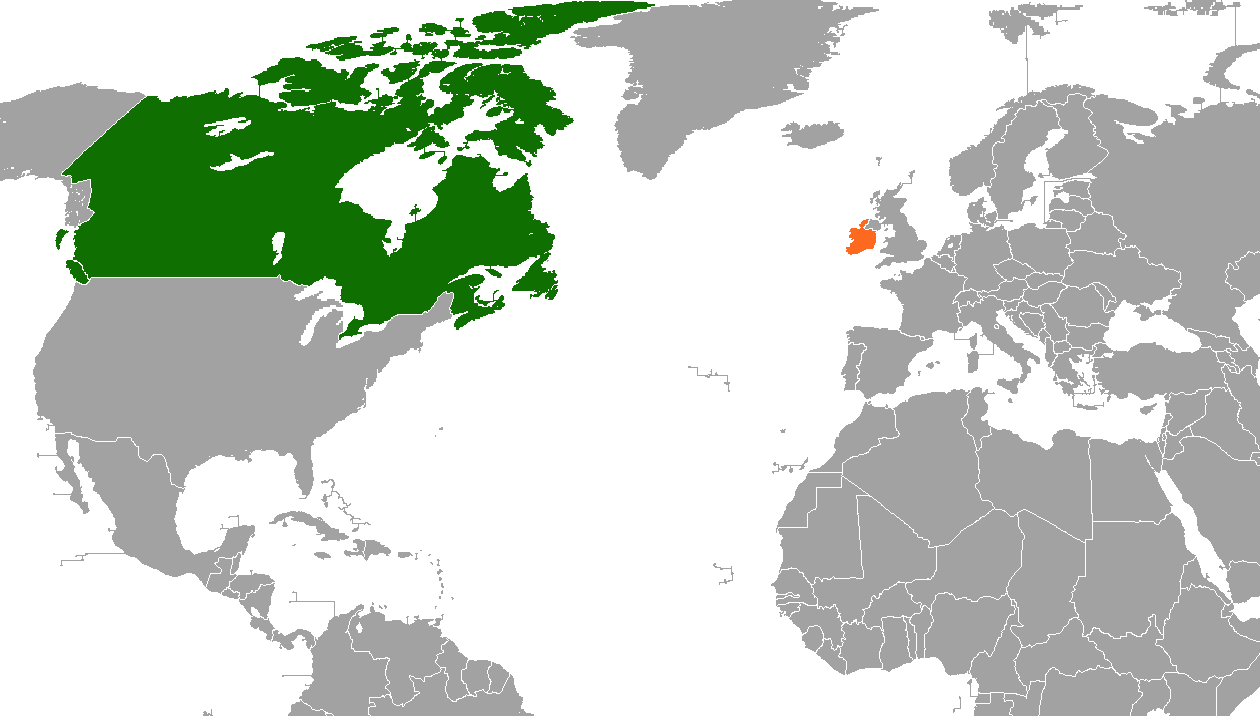

- Canada: Ireland

Diplomatic mission
- Embassy of Canada, Dublin: Embassy of Ireland, Ottawa

Canada and Ireland enjoy friendly relations, the importance of which centres on the history of Irish migration to Canada and the two countries' shared history as parts of the British Empire. Approximately 4.5 million Canadians – 14% of Canada's population – claimed to have Irish ancestors. Both nations are mutual members of the Organisation for Economic Co-operation and Development, United Nations and the World Trade Organization.

== History ==
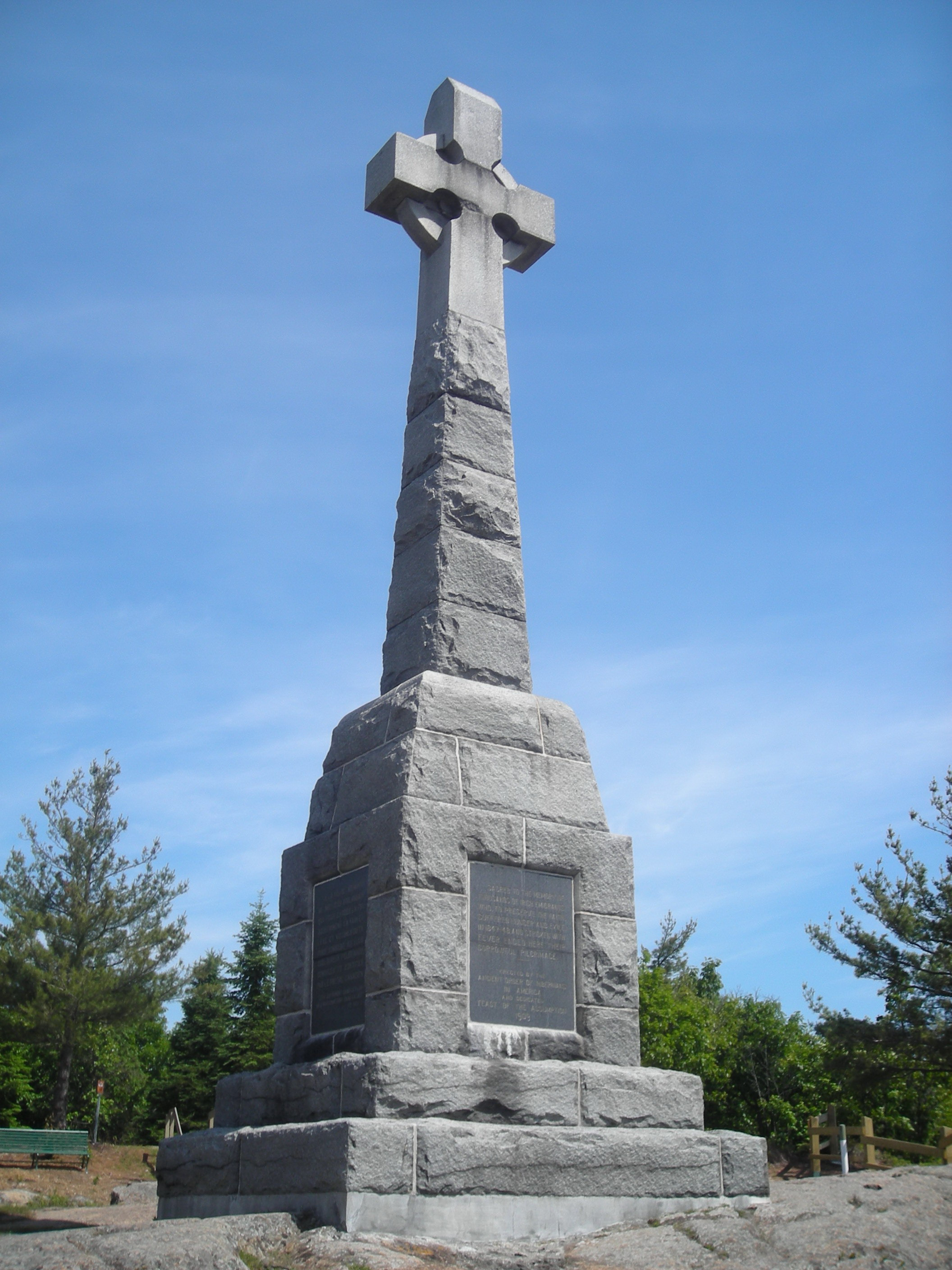
Celtic Cross at Grosse Île is a memorial to the thousands of Irish migrants who arrived in Canada

The first Irish settlers arrived in Canada in the 17th century when the French began to arrive in present-day Canada and brought with them Irish soldiers. In the 18th century, Irish fishermen would sail to Newfoundland and Labrador to fish off the coasts, and many settled in the province. By 1850, over 500,000 Irish migrants arrived in Canada, though many more continued onwards to the United States.

Before 1922, both Canada and Ireland were part of the British Empire and therefore had no international relations separate from British ones. From 1922 to 1937, the Irish Free State was a Dominion, like Canada, under the British Crown but self-governing. Canada sent its first High Commissioner to Ireland, John Hall Kelly, in 1929. This was at a time when Britain did not allow Canada to have embassies in most states, and Britain's representative in Ireland was not allowed to use the title of ambassador. In 1937, Ireland changed its constitution to give itself more complete independence from the United Kingdom; however, there was still some ambiguity over the role of the Crown in Irish law. In 1931, after the signing of the Statute of Westminster, Canada became a sovereign and independent nation. In 1939, both nations opened resident diplomatic missions in each other's capitals, respectively.

In 1948, the Taoiseach (head of government) of Ireland, John A. Costello, was visiting Canada when he announced that Ireland would declare itself a republic. The reason why he chose to announce in Canada is a subject of debate. It may have been that Costello was offended by the behaviour of the Governor General of Canada, Harold Alexander, 1st Earl Alexander of Tunis, who was of Northern Irish descent and who allegedly placed symbols of Northern Ireland, notably a replica of the famous Roaring Meg cannon used in the Siege of Derry, before an affronted Costello at a state dinner. What is certain is that the prior arrangement, whereby toasts to the king (symbolising Canada) and the president (representing Ireland) were to be proposed, was broken. Only a toast to the king was proposed to the fury of the Irish delegation. Shortly afterwards, Costello announced the plan to declare the republic. Other explanations for the announcement being made at this time have been offered, including the idea that the change was already planned and an Irish newspaper was about to "break" the story. Whatever the reason, the Republic of Ireland Act 1948 soon passed with support from all parties.

In 1986, Canadian prime minister Brian Mulroney announced that Canada would contribute up to $10 million over 10 years to Northern Ireland and the Republic of Ireland for economic and social development programs. In recent times Canada has been an active supporter of the Northern Ireland peace process as symbolised by former Canadian Chief of the Defence Staff John de Chastelain heading the Independent International Commission on Decommissioning. In August 2017, Taoiseach Leo Varadkar travelled to Canada and joined Canadian prime minister Justin Trudeau in the Montréal Pride Parade.

In June 2026, Canadian prime minister Mark Carney paid a visit to Ireland and met with Taoiseach Micheál Martin.

== High-level visits ==
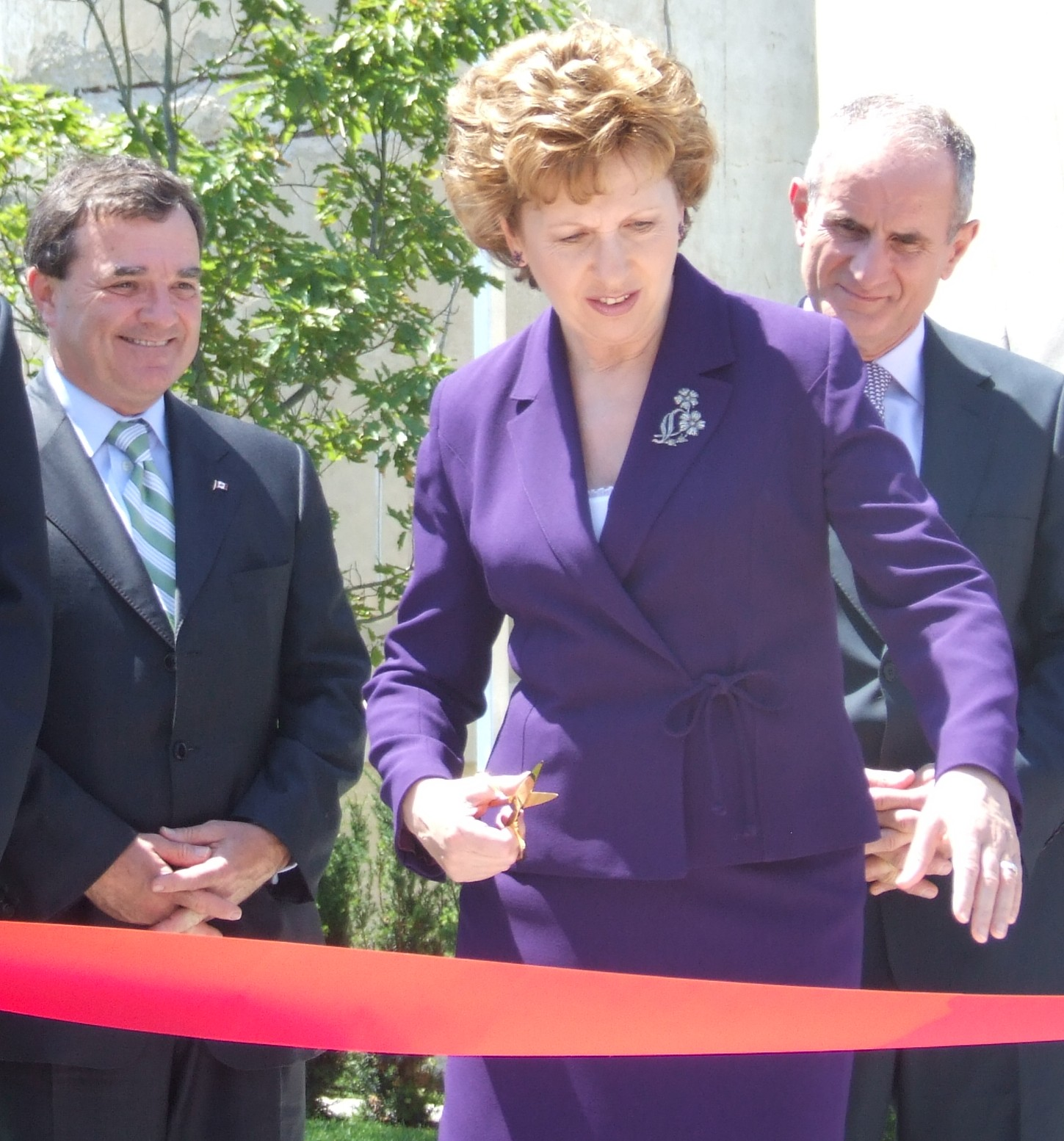
Irish President Mary McAleese cutting the ribbon at Ireland Park in Toronto, Canada; June 2007.

Prime Ministerial visits from Canada to Ireland

- Prime Minister John Diefenbaker (1961)
- Prime Minister Pierre Trudeau (1975)
- Prime Minister Brian Mulroney (1991)
- Prime Minister Jean Chrétien (1999)
- Prime Minister Paul Martin (2005)
- Prime Minister Stephen Harper (2013)
- Prime Minister Justin Trudeau (2017)
- Prime Minister Mark Carney (2026)

Presidential and Prime Ministerial (Taoiseach) visits from Ireland to Canada

- Taoiseach John A. Costello (1948)
- President Éamon de Valera (1964)
- Taoiseach Garret FitzGerald (1985)
- President Mary Robinson (1994)
- President Mary McAleese (1998, 2007)
- Taoiseach Bertie Ahern (2005)
- Taoiseach Enda Kenny (2017)
- Taoiseach Leo Varadkar (2017)

== Trade ==
In October 2016, Canada and the European Union (which includes Ireland) signed a free trade agreement known as the "Comprehensive Economic and Trade Agreement". In 2025, total trade between Canada and Ireland amounted to $6 billion Canadian dollars. Canada's main exports to Ireland include: chemical products, vehicles and equipment, machine, mechanical, and electronic products. Ireland's main exports to Canada include chemical products, specialized instruments, food, and animal-based produce.

== Resident diplomatic missions ==
of Canada in Ireland

- Dublin (Embassy)

of Ireland in Canada

- Ottawa (Embassy)
- Toronto (Consulate-General)
- Vancouver (Consulate-General)

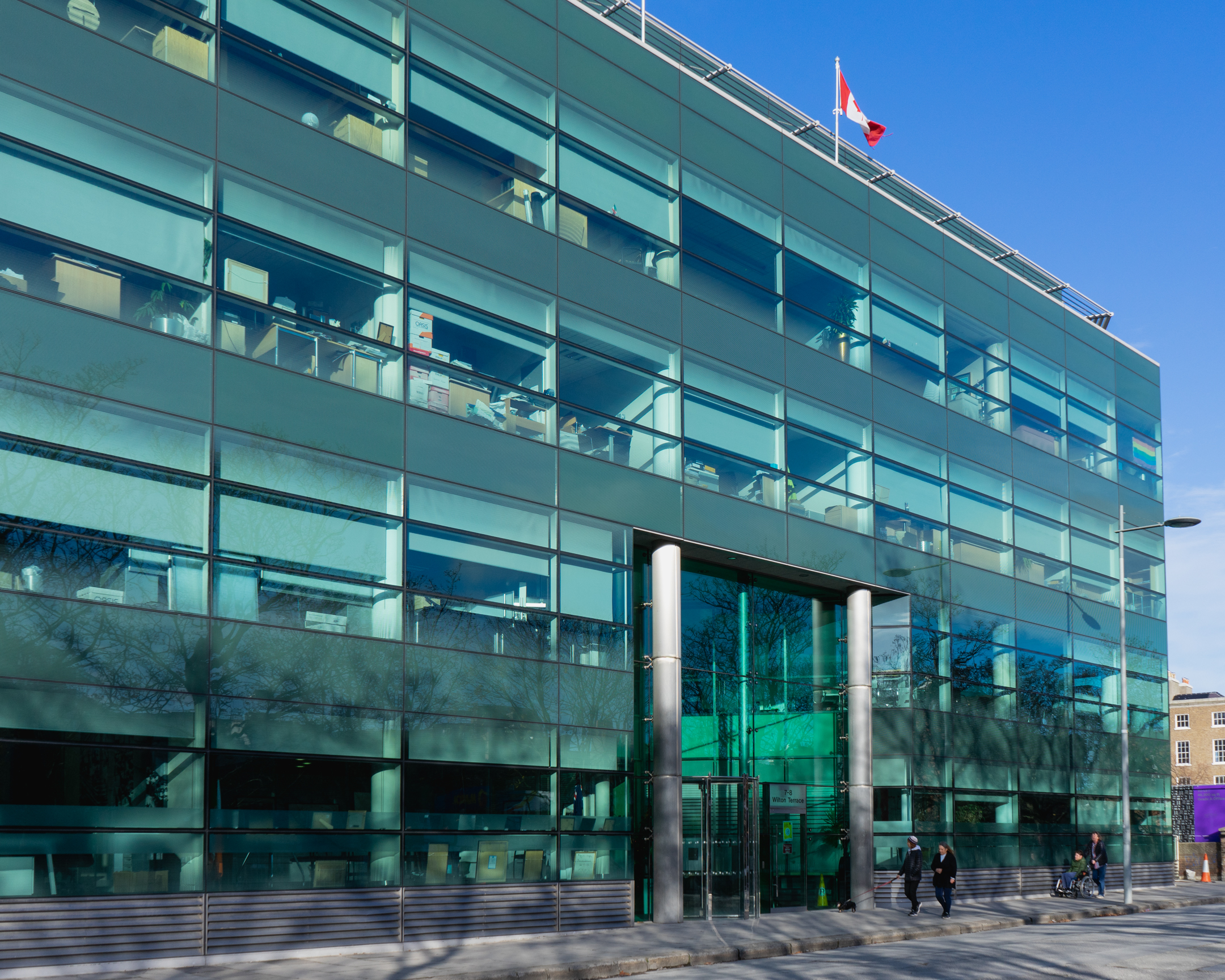
Embassy of Canada in Dublin

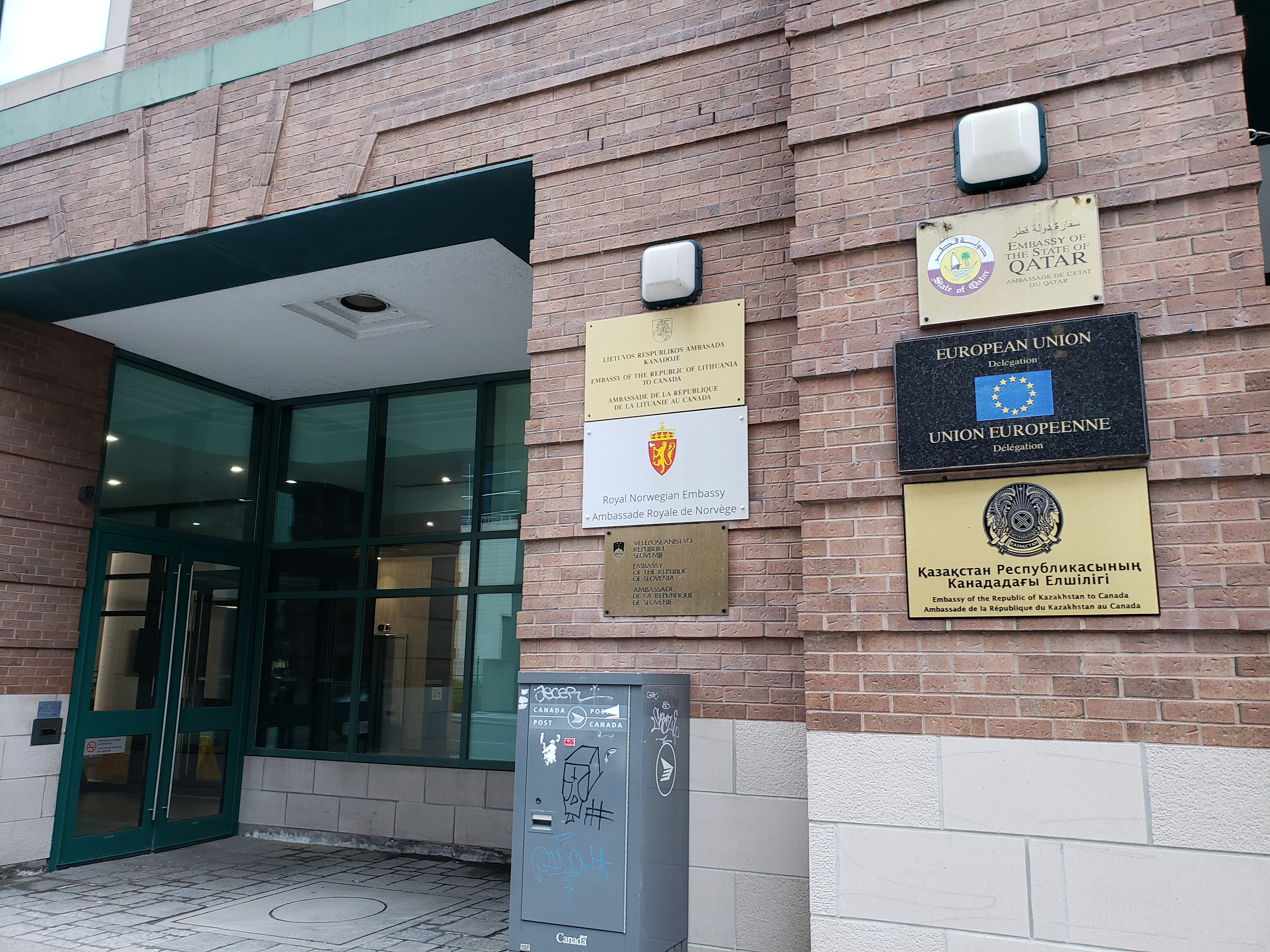
Building hosting the Embassy of Ireland in Ottawa

== See also ==
- Embassy of Ireland in Ottawa
- Fenian raids
- Irish Canadians
- Irish Quebecers
- Irish language in Newfoundland
- Strathmore (Killiney)
