= Kevin Vickers =

Canadian politician (born 1956)

Kevin Vickers ONB SC
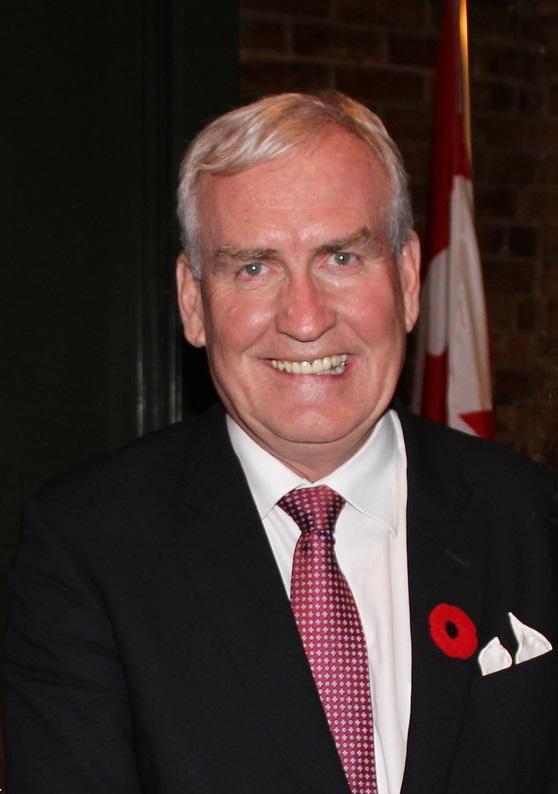
- Vickers in 2015

Leader of the New Brunswick Liberal Association
- In office April 24, 2019 – September 14, 2020
- Preceded by: Denis Landry (interim)
- Succeeded by: Roger Melanson (interim)

29th Canadian Ambassador to Ireland
- In office January 19, 2015 – March 2, 2019
- Preceded by: Loyola Hearn
- Succeeded by: Suzanne Drisdelle (Chargé d’Affaires ad interim) Nancy Smyth

9th Sergeant-at-Arms of the Canadian House of Commons
- In office September 1, 2006 – January 10, 2015
- Clerk: Audrey O'Brien
- Preceded by: Maurice Gaston Cloutier
- Succeeded by: Pat McDonell (acting)

Personal details
- Born: Kevin Michael Vickers; September 29, 1956 (age 70) Chatham, New Brunswick
- Party: Liberal (Provincial)
- Parent(s): William James Vickers; Monica Margaret Vickers (née Kingston)
- Occupation: Police officer, diplomat, politician
- Police career
- Department: Royal Canadian Mounted Police
- Service years: 1976–2005
- Status: Retired
- Rank: Chief Superintendent

Kevin Michael Vickers ONB SC (born September 29, 1956) is a Canadian politician, former diplomat, and retired police officer. He served as the leader of the New Brunswick Liberal Association from 2019 to 2020, a retired Canadian diplomat, former Sergeant at Arms and former Royal Canadian Mounted Police (RCMP) officer. He was the Canadian Ambassador to Ireland from 2015 until 2019 and the ninth Sergeant-at-Arms of the House of Commons of Canada from 2006 to 2015.

Vickers participated in ending the October 22, 2014, shootings at Parliament Hill alongside RCMP Constable Curtis Barrett when they both returned heavy fire at gunman Zehaf-Bibeau. Minutes earlier, Zehaf-Bibeau had killed Corporal Nathan Cirillo, a soldier, at the Canadian National War Memorial and shot a constable at the Peace Tower entrance. For his actions Vickers has been called a hero by the Prime Minister, Ministers of the Crown, the Leader of the Opposition, and Canadian and international media. Barrett's contribution was largely ignored. On February 8, 2016, Vickers was presented with the Star of Courage along with six others involved in bringing the incident under control. Eight others were awarded the Medal of Bravery.

Prior to his role in Parliament, Vickers served in the RCMP for 29 years, rising to the rank of Chief Superintendent.

== Early life and family ==
Vickers was born at Hotel Dieu in Chatham, New Brunswick, where his mother, Monica Margaret (née Kingston), was a nurse, and his father, William James "Bill" (1921–2004), operated a dairy named Northumberland Co-op Dairy. He is of Irish heritage.

Vickers grew up in Newcastle (now part of the city of Miramichi). His father invited home students from developing countries studying co-operatives at the Coady International Institute at St. Francis Xavier University in Antigonish, Nova Scotia.

Vickers resides in Miramichi, New Brunswick, with his wife Ann. He has two children: Andrew and Laura. They have a cottage in Wayerton, New Brunswick.

== Career ==
=== Policing ===
Vickers served in the Royal Canadian Mounted Police for 29 years, attaining the rank of Chief Superintendent. He gained prominence as the incident commander during the 1999–2000 Burnt Church Crisis. He spent ten years stationed in Alberta and ten years stationed in the Northwest Territories, and subsequently was the director-general of the RCMP's aboriginal police services branch. In 2003, he became Director General of the National Contract Policing Branch for Canada, managing nine separate branches of law enforcement.

Throughout his RCMP career, Vickers provided security for VIPs, including Queen Elizabeth II and Prince Andrew. He also served as an aide-de-camp for the Lieutenant Governor of New Brunswick.

=== Sergeant-at-Arms ===
In June 2005 he joined the House of Commons as Director of Security Operations. He was appointed Sergeant-at-Arms for the Canadian House of Commons on August 24, 2006, and began serving on September 1, 2006.

On acting to permit the kirpan, the ceremonial dagger that observant Sikhs are required to wear at all times, to be worn in the Commons, Vickers recalled that in his interview for the post "... I told them that if they made me their Sergeant-at-Arms, there would be no walls built around Canada's Parliamentary buildings ... I have kept my promise."

In 2013, when Idle No More protestors arrived at Parliament Hill, Vickers participated in a ritual exchange of tobacco with Serpent River First Nation chief Isadore Day.

On October 22, 2014, during the Parliament Hill attack, Vickers was initially identified as the sole hero and credited with the fatal shooting of Michael Zehaf-Bibeau, but once the independent OPP report was released on June 1, 2015, it was revealed that the suspect was shot several times by both Vickers and RCMP Constable Curtis Barrett. Zehaf-Bibeau entered the Centre Block under the Peace Tower, shooting a Commons security guard in the leg, exchanging gunfire, before running down the Hall of Honour to an alcove by the entrance to the Library of Parliament, which is beside Vickers' office. Vickers pulled a 9mm handgun from a lock-box and entered the hall. He stood behind the pillar in an opposite position to Zehaf-Bibeau and shortly after Zehaf-Bibeau had pulled away from the pillar and shot at Barrett, Vickers threw himself on the ground and fired multiple shots at the gunman, effectively disabling him. A niece told the Calgary Sun, "This is the first time in his career that he's shot anyone."

=== Ambassador to Ireland ===
Vickers officially started duties as the Canadian ambassador to Ireland on 21 January 2015, replacing Loyola Hearn.

On May 26, 2016, Vickers engaged a protester who was interrupting a ceremony commemorating British soldiers who were killed in the 1916 Easter Rising, dragging the man to one side before handing him over to Gardaí officers.

== Politics ==
On March 15, 2019, Vickers announced he would run for the leadership of the New Brunswick Liberal Association to replace Brian Gallant. He was acclaimed as the leader after the only other contender René Ephestion dropped out. The Liberal Party's executive board acclaimed Vickers on the recommendation by the leadership convention's steering committee on April 16, 2019, effective April 24, 2019.

Vickers resigned as leader after failing to either win his seat of Miramichi in the September 14, 2020 New Brunswick general election or prevent Premier Blaine Higgs's Progressive Conservative minority government from gaining enough seats to become a majority, as the Liberals lost three seats.

Vickers endorsed Karina Gould in the 2025 Liberal Party of Canada leadership election.

== Honours ==

- 1992: 125th Anniversary of the Confederation of Canada Medal in 1992 for "significant contributions to fellow citizens, to their community, or to Canada."
- 2002: Queen Elizabeth II Golden Jubilee Medal for contributions to public life.
- 2008: Royal Canadian Mounted Police Long Service Medal.
- 2009: Honoured by the Association of Progressive Muslims of Canada for "long outstanding service", and "efforts to promote bias-free policing and diversity in the workplace".
- 2011: Honoured by the Canadian branch of the World Sikh Organization for his decision that Sikh Members of Parliament could wear their kirpans in the House.
- 2015: Order of New Brunswick for his role in stopping the shooting at Parliament Hill on October 22, 2014
- 2016: Star of Courage, awarded to him along with other recipients, for his role in stopping the shooting on Parliament Hill. The citation reads

On October 22, 2014, members of the House of Commons protection services and the RCMP were instrumental in stopping an armed man who had stormed the Centre Block of the Parliament Buildings in Ottawa, Ontario. Constable Son was stationed at the front entrance when he spotted the man entering with a concealed rifle. The constable lunged to gain control of the firearm, but it discharged and struck him in the leg. Drawn to the Rotunda by the noise, Corporal Malo and Constable Thom took cover and exchanged several rounds with the gunman after he entered the building. Constable Létourneau tracked the gunman down the Hall of Honour toward the Library of Parliament and fired at him several times. RCMP Sergeant Rozon, Corporal Daigle and constables Barrett, Bergeron, Bubelis, Célestin, Fraser, Marcoux, Palmer, Ruest and Waye, who had assembled outside the Peace Tower, entered the Centre Block. Supported by their colleagues, Sergeant Rozon, Corporal Daigle and constables Barrett and Fraser assumed a tactical formation (IARD) as they charged down the Hall of Honour. With the shooter now cornered in an alcove leading to the Library, Sergeant-at-Arms Vickers, after being advised of the shooter’s location, dove to the floor in front of him and fired his weapon. RCMP Constable Barrett walked directly toward the gunman while also firing his weapon. The collective actions of these 16 individuals brought the incident to an end in less than three minutes, and avoided further tragedy.

Vickers has also been recognized by the United States Drug Enforcement Administration for his "Outstanding Contribution to Drug Enforcement".

=== Honorary degrees ===
Honorary degrees

Location	Date	School	Degree	Gave commencement address
New Brunswick	11 May 2015	Mount Allison University	Doctor of Laws (LL.D)	Yes
Saskatchewan	4 June 2015	University of Regina	Doctor of Laws	Yes

=== Unofficial honours ===
Vickers received an extended standing ovation in the House of Commons for his role in ending the 2014 shootings at Parliament Hill, Ottawa.

Comedian Stephen Colbert had high praise for Vickers, comparing his actions to those of Bruce Willis in the movie Die Hard and also praising his stoic reaction to the standing ovation in Parliament.

French President François Hollande said in an address to the Canadian Parliament, "I salute the courage of Kevin Vickers, who is known all across the world."

"The International Conference on Homeland Security in Tel Aviv in November 2014 opened with calling Sergeant-at-Arms Kevin Vickers to the stage to acknowledge him for his courage." During the same trip, Vickers was recognized by the speaker of the Israeli Knesset and asked to rise in his seat in the gallery to be acknowledged by parliamentarians.

== See also ==
- René Jalbert
- Shawinigan Handshake
- Eugene Goodman - United States Capitol Police officer who received recognition during the January 6 United States Capitol attack for diverting protestors away from the United States Senate chamber

Government offices
Preceded by Maurice Gaston Cloutier	Sergeant-at-Arms of the Canadian House of Commons; 2006–2015	Succeeded by Pat McDonell (acting)
Diplomatic posts
Preceded by Loyola Hearn	Canadian Ambassador to Ireland; 2015–2019	Succeeded by Nancy Smyth
