= Arthur Beauchesne =

Canadian civil servant (1876–1959)

Arthur Beauchesne CMG, QC, FRSC
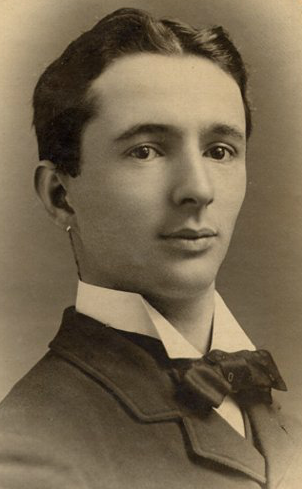

Clerk of the House of Commons
- In office 1925–1949
- Preceded by: William Barton Northrup
- Succeeded by: Léon Raymond

Personal details
- Born: June 15, 1876 Carleton, Quebec, Canada
- Died: April 7, 1959 (aged 82) Ottawa, Ontario, Canada
- Party: Conservative
- Education: St. Joseph's College

Arthur Beauchesne CMG QC FRSC (June 15, 1876 – April 7, 1959) was a Canadian civil servant who was Clerk of the House of Commons from 1925 to 1949. He is the author of the procedural manual, Rules and Forms of the House of Commons of Canada, which is used by Canadian Members of Parliament during parliamentary debates.

Born in Carleton, Bonaventure County, Quebec, Beauchesne received a bachelor's degree from St. Joseph's College in Memramcook, New Brunswick. He then studied literature and law in Montreal, receiving a degree in literature in 1897. He was called to the Quebec Bar in 1904.

In 1912, he joined the federal civil service working in the Department of Justice and in 1916 he was appointed Deputy Clerk of the House of Commons. In 1925, he was appointed Clerk of the House of Commons. From 1939 to 1945 he was acting Sergeant-at-Arms of the Canadian House of Commons following the departure of Milton Fowler Gregg and during World War II. Beauchesne retired from public service in 1949.

He was the Conservative candidate in the riding of Bonaventure for the House of Commons of Canada in the 1908 federal election. He lost to Charles Marcil. He ran again in the 1953 federal election for the riding of Ottawa East, losing to Jean-Thomas Richard.

He was made a Companion of the Order of St Michael and St George in 1933. In 2003, he was designated a Persons of National Historic Significance.
