= Alistair Fraser (parliamentary official) =

Canadian lawyer (1923–1997)

8th Clerk of the House of Commons of Canada
- In office 1967–1979
- Preceded by: Léon Raymond
- Succeeded by: Bev Koester

Clerk Assistant of the House of Commons of Canada
- In office 1966–1967
- Clerk: Léon Raymond

Personal details
- Born: January 5, 1923 Toronto, Ontario
- Died: September 1, 1997 (aged 74) Ottawa, Ontario
- Party: Liberal
- Relations: Duncan Cameron Fraser (Grandfather); James Hamilton Ross (Grandfather)
- Parent(s): Alistair Fraser; Jane Ross
- Education: McGill University; University of British Columbia
- Occupation: Lawyer, political aide, parliamentary official

Military service
- Branch/service: Canadian Army
- Unit: Royal Canadian Artillery

Alistair Fraser (January 5, 1923 – September 1, 1997) was the 8th Clerk of the House of Commons of Canada, serving from 1967 to 1979.
