= Robert Marleau =

Canadian public servant

Robert Marleau CM
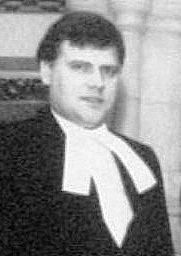
- Robert Marleau in 1988

1st Integrity Commissioner of the City of Ottawa
- Incumbent
- Assumed office 2012
- Preceded by: new office

Interim Privacy Commissioner of Canada
- In office June 2003 – December 2003
- Preceded by: George Radwanski
- Succeeded by: Jennifer Stoddart

Information Commissioner of Canada
- In office 2007–2009
- Preceded by: John Mercer Reid
- Succeeded by: Suzanne Legault

Clerk of the House of Commons of Canada
- In office 1987–2000
- Preceded by: Bev Koester
- Succeeded by: William C. Corbett

Clerk Assistant of the House of Commons of Canada
- In office 1983–1987 Serving with Mary Ann Griffith and Phillip Laundy

Personal details
- Born: Cornwall, Ontario
- Education: University of Ottawa

Robert Marleau CM, is a former Canadian federal public servant and former Information Commissioner of Canada. Beginning in 1970, Marleau served 31 years in the Parliament of Canada, 13 of which were as the Clerk of the House of Commons from July 1987 to July 2000. From July 2000 until his retirement at the end of January 2001, he served as Senior Advisor to the Speaker of the House of Commons.

He came out of retirement to serve as Interim Privacy Commissioner and again as Information Commissioner from 2006 to 2009. In his own words, during this time he was "for proactive disclosure, ... for more communication, posting more on the websites, using informal communication methods rather than the Access to Information Act... It's not helpful to appear to be deliberately not communicating," Marleau resigned from his position in late June 2009, roughly midway through his term. As part of a strongly worded criticism published by Bruce Campion-Smith, contemporary Ottawa Bureau Chief of the Toronto Star, he lamented one day prior to his resignation the decline of "effort by any government to have" the Access to Information Act or similar "processes keep pace with time, change and technology."

As Chief Clerk of the House in 2000, he was the editor, along with Camille Montpetit, of House of Commons Procedure and Practice, First Edition, 2000., which is available both online and in print. This work is part of an ongoing effort, begun in 1884 by Sir John George Bourinot, to document Canadian Parliamentary procedure.

Marleau earned a B.A. in French literature from the University of Ottawa. He received an honorary PhD in 2002.

In December 2016, Marleau was named a Member of the Order of Canada.

== See also ==
Standard reference works on Canadian Parliamentary procedure have been written by other Clerks of the House, including

- Sir John George Bourinot
- Beauchesne's Parliamentary Rules and Forms
