= William Burns Lindsay =

William Burns Lindsay may refer to:

- William Burns Lindsay Jr. (1824–1872), Clerk of the Legislative Assembly of the Province of Canada and the first Clerk of the House of Commons of Canada
- William Burns Lindsay Sr. (1796–1862), Clerk of the Legislative Assembly of Lower Canada and the Legislative Assembly of the Province of Canada
