= List of Sergeants-at-Arms of the Canadian House of Commons =

The Sergeants-at-Arms of the House of Commons of Canada is a senior officer for the legislative body appointed by Governor General-in-Council through letter patent under the Great Seal of Canada. The Sergeant-at Arms assists the Clerk of the House of Commons as head of parliamentary precinct services, performing certain administrative and ceremonial functions, and maintaining order and security in the parliamentary buildings.

Ceremonial functions performed by the sergeant-at-arms includes administering the Canadian oath of allegiance to newly elected members of the House of Commons. Additionally it is the sergeant-at-arms’ responsibility to bring the ceremonial mace into the legislative chambers before the Speaker of the House of Commons enters the chambers. The sergeant-at-arms occupies a bar in the chambers until proceedings are completed, after which he removes the ceremonial mace from the chambers.

Ten individuals have been appointed to the position since Canadian Confederation in 1867. All previous appointees previously held positions in the Canadian military or the Royal Canadian Mounted Police; although there is no requirement that requires appointees to be drawn from these services. The current Sergeant-at-Arms is Pat McDonell, who was formally appointed to the position in July 2019.

== List of sergeants-at-arms ==
No.	Image	Name	Branch/Service	Appointed	Left office	Notes
1		Lieutenant-Colonel Donald William MacDonnell	Canadian Militia (Note: The Canadian Militia was renamed the Canadian Army through an Order in Council in November 1940.)	2 November 1867		Appointed to the position during the first session of the Parliament of Canada. Previously served as the Sergeant-at-Arms of the Legislative Assembly of the Province of Canada from 14 June 1854 to 1 July 1867.
2		Lieutenant-Colonel Henry Robert Smith	Canadian Militia	13 January 1892	20 September 1917	Previously served as Deputy Sergeant-at-Arms for the House of Commons of Canada from 1872 to 1892.
3		Lieutenant-Colonel Henry William Bowie	Canadian Militia	5 March 1918		Previously served as Deputy Sergeant-at-Arms for the House of Commons of Canada from 1891 to 1918.
4		Lieutenant-Colonel Harry Judson Coghill	Canadian Militia	26 July 1930	9 January 1934	Died in office
5		Major Milton Fowler Gregg (Note: Held the rank of major when initially appointed as a sergeant-at-arms. He was later promoted to the rank of brigadier while serving during the Second World War.)	Canadian Militia	13 February 1934		Gregg was recalled to active service with the Canadian Army during the Second World War, requiring the Clerk of the House of Commons, Arthur Beauchesne to assume the acting role of Sergeant-at-Arms while Gregg was on active duty.
6		Lieutenant-Colonel William John Franklin	Canadian Army	24 August 1945	1960	
7		Lieutenant-Colonel David Vivian Currie	Canadian Army	7 January 1960	1978	
8		Major General Maurice Gaston Cloutier	Canadian Army	27 April 1978	24 March 2005	Left office due to illness after consultating with the Clerk to the House of Commons. After Cloutier's departure, Audrey O'Brien, the Deputy Clerk of the House of Commons, served as the acting sergeant-at-arms from March 2005 to September 2006.
9		Chief Superintendent Kevin Vickers	Royal Canadian Mounted Police	1 September 2006	January 2015	First civilian with no military background to be appointed to the position. Previously served as a chief superintendent with the Royal Canadian Mounted Police.
10		Assistant Commissioner Pat McDonell	Royal Canadian Mounted Police	4 July 2019	Incumbent	Previously served as the acting sergeant-at-arms from January 2015 to July 2019, when he was formally appointed to the position.
