= Alfred Patrick =

Clerk of the House of Commons of Canada (died 1892)

2nd Clerk of the House of Commons of Canada
- In office 1873–1880
- Preceded by: William Burns Lindsay
- Succeeded by: John George Bourinot

1st Clerk Assistant of the House of Commons of Canada
- In office 1867–1873
- Preceded by: new office
- Succeeded by: Eugène-Urgel Piché

Personal details
- Born: 1810 or 1811
- Died: July 18, 1892 (aged 81) Niagara-on-the-Lake, Ontario

Alfred Patrick CMG (1810/1811 – July 18, 1892) was the second Clerk of the House of Commons of Canada, having served from 1873 to 1880.

In the 1882 Birthday Honours, he was created a Companion of the Order of St Michael and St George.
