= Charles Koester =

Charles Koester may refer to:

- Bev Koester (Charles Beverley Koester, 1926–1998), Canadian naval officer, civil servant and Clerk of the Canadian House of Commons
- Charles Roman Koester (1915–1997), American bishop of the Catholic Church
