= Patrick McDonnell (disambiguation) =

Patrick McDonnell (born 1956) is an American cartoonist.

Patrick or (Pat) McDonell or McDonnell may also refer to:

- Patrick McDonnell (actor), Irish actor
- Pat McDonnell, Irish hurler (born 1950)
- Pat McDonell, Canadian police officer
