= Edward Chester Plow =

Canadian politician (1904–1988)

The Honourable Edward C. Plow CBE DSO CD
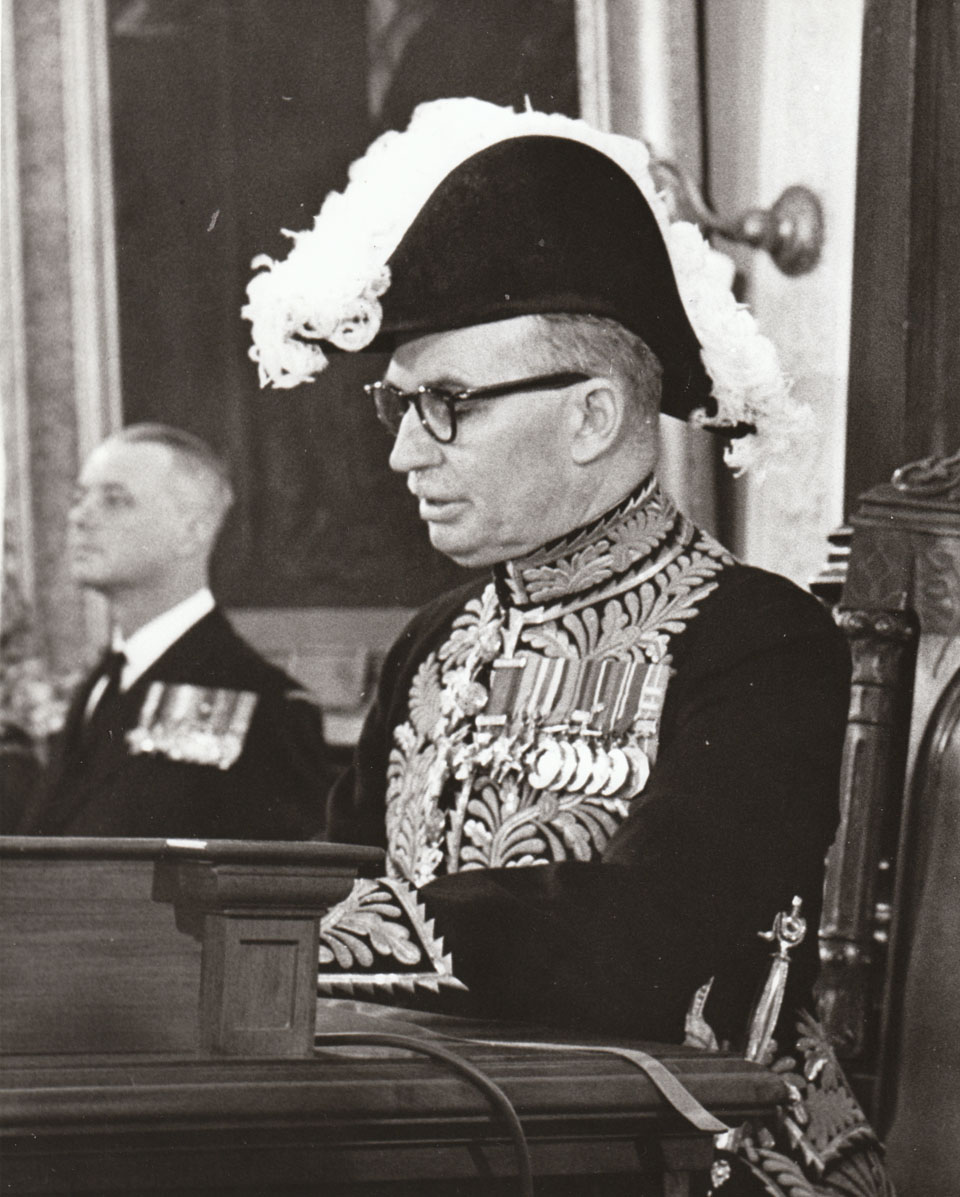
- Plow in 1962

22nd Lieutenant Governor of Nova Scotia
- In office January 15, 1958 – March 1, 1963
- Monarch: Elizabeth II
- Governors General: Vincent Massey; Georges Vanier
- Premier: Robert Stanfield
- Preceded by: Alistair Fraser
- Succeeded by: Henry Poole MacKeen

Personal details
- Born: September 28, 1904 St. Albans, Vermont
- Died: April 25, 1988 (aged 83) Brockville, Ontario
- Awards: C.B.E. Distinguished Service Order; Canadian Forces' Decoration

Military service
- Allegiance: Canada
- Branch/service: Royal Canadian Horse Artillery
- Rank: Major General
- Commands: 1st Canadian Corps

Edward Chester Plow CBE DSO CD (September 28, 1904 – April 25, 1988) was a Canadian soldier who served as the 22nd Lieutenant Governor of Nova Scotia from 1958 to 1963.

== Education ==
Born in St. Albans, Vermont, Plow was educated at Lower Canada College and then entered the Royal Military College of Canada in 1921, student # 1649.

== Military career ==
Plow was commissioned into the Royal Canadian Horse Artillery in 1929 and served during the Second World War. After the war, he rose through senior command positions, eventually serving as General Officer Commanding Eastern Command from 1950 until 1958.

== Lieutenant Governor of Nova Scotia ==
Plow was named lieutenant governor in December 1957 and was sworn in the following month, serving from 1958 to 1963. During his tenure he performed the usual vice-regal duties, including opening sessions of the legislature; the Nova Scotia Archives holds a 1962 photograph showing Plow reading the Speech from the Throne. In July–August 1959, Queen Elizabeth II and the Duke of Edinburgh visited Nova Scotia; archival summaries note events in Halifax-Dartmouth that included a state dinner and presentations at the Garrison Grounds during the vice-regal period.

== Death ==
Plow died of lung cancer in Brockville, Ontario, on April 25, 1988.
