= Strathmore (Killiney) =

Mansion in Killiney, Ireland

Coordinates: 53.2603°N 6.115°W

Strathmore is a mansion in Killiney, Dunleary-Rathdown in Ireland, and formerly the Official residence of the Canadian Ambassador to Ireland.

The house dates from the 1860s and was designed by Dublin-born Irish architect Alfred Gresham Jones and was extensively remodelled in the late 1940s by British architect Oliver Hill. It is located 10 miles (16 km) south of Dublin City Centre, 200 yards (180 m) from Killiney DART station. Strathmore is approximately 760 square metres (8,200 sq ft) in area.

Strathmore sits on a 3.654-hectare (9.03-acre) triangular piece of land surrounded mostly by Strathmore Road, but faces Killiney Hill Road. It features views of Killiney Bay, Sugar Loaf Mountain, and northern County Wicklow. The grounds vary from formal gardens, walled gardens, extensive wooded areas to magnificent open parkland at the lower level.

The mansion purchased by the Government of Canada in 1957 for Can$54,000, served as the Canadian ambassadorial residence for fifty years until it was sold for Can$17.6 million in 2008, despite lobbying against the sale by former Ambassadors and Irish diaspora groups in Canada.

== See also ==
- Canada–Ireland relations
