= Nancy Smyth =

Canadian diplomat

Her Excellency Nancy Smyth
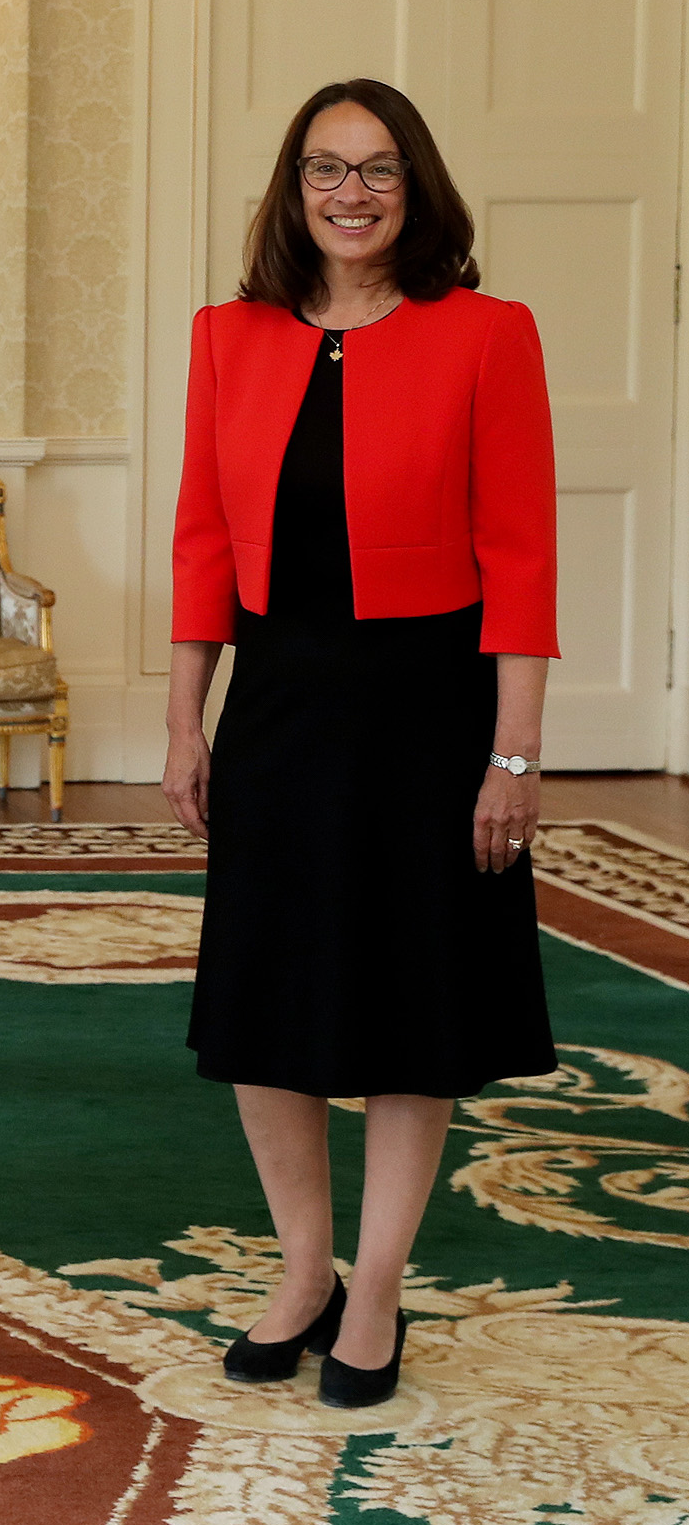

Canadian Ambassador to Ireland
- In office 17 June 2021 – August 2024
- Monarchs: Elizabeth II; Charles III
- Prime Minister: Justin Trudeau
- Preceded by: Kevin Vickers
- Succeeded by: Dennis King

Personal details
- Spouse: Lex Burger
- Education: Carleton University

Nancy Smyth is a Canadian career foreign affairs professional and former ambassador to Ireland. Her term started in June 2021 when she presented her credentials to the President of Ireland, Michael D. Higgins at Áras an Uachtaráin. She has undertaken several official engagements including attending a memorial of the victims of the 1985 Air India bombing, commemorating the 1917 sinking of the ocean liner SS Laurentic and advocating for increased trade between Ireland and Canada. She was reported to have left the position in August 2024, and was replaced by former Prince Edward Island premier Dennis King.

Diplomatic posts
Preceded by Kevin Vickers	Canadian Ambassador to Ireland; 2021–2024	Succeeded by Dennis King
