= Pat McDonell =

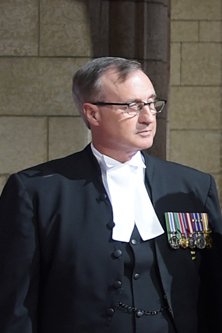

10th Sergeant-at-Arms of the Canadian House of Commons
- Incumbent
- Assumed office July 2019
- Clerk: Charles Robert
- Preceded by: Kevin Vickers

Personal details
- Occupation: Police officer, parliamentary official
- Police career
- Country: Canada
- Department: Royal Canadian Mounted Police
- Rank: Assistant Commissioner

Pat McDonell is the Sergeant-at-Arms for the Canadian House of Commons. He first served under, and then took over the duties of Kevin Vickers when Vickers was appointed Canadian Ambassador to Ireland in January 2015, on an interim basis. He was confirmed in this role on July 1, 2019.

The Office of Sergeant-at-Arms has been a part of parliamentary tradition for over 500 years. It has spread to jurisdictions throughout the Commonwealth from its medieval roots in England and France. The office is intimately associated with the traditional symbols of Parliament, particularly the mace. While the present SAA and his predecessors share a rich history and other similarities, the position has evolved over the centuries to meet contemporary needs.

As Sergeant-at-Arms, McDonell’s primary responsibilities are maintaining peace and order and enforcing security in the Chamber under the direction of the Speaker, performing parliamentary ceremonial functions, and safeguarding the heritage and traditions of the position of Sergeant-at-Arms.

As the Corporate Security Officer, McDonell’s responsibilities include providing executive management and senior leadership for the HoC corporate security program, and ensuring the ongoing implementation and operation of its services. The position includes the ceremonial function of carrying the ceremonial gold mace into the House of Commons before every sitting. He joined the Parliamentary security team as Director of the Senate Protective Service in January 2011.

McDonell was honored by a standing ovation from Parliament along with Vickers and the rest of the security team after a gunman shot a soldier standing guard at the National War Memorial before storming Parliament Hill and being killed by Vickers in the Hall of Honour on October 22, 2014.

Prior to his role in Parliament, McDonell served in the Royal Canadian Mounted Police (RCMP) for 30 years, rising to the rank of Assistant Commissioner. His last RCMP post was head of RCMP's protective policing unit, which includes the Mounties who patrol Parliament Hill and embassies in Ottawa and Canada's air marshall service.

McDonell is the chair of the board of directors of the Canadian Association of Sergeants-at-Arms (CASAA), formally incorporated on April 29, 2010.
