= List of ambassadors and high commissioners of Canada to Ireland =

List of ambassadors

Ambassador of Canada to Ireland
- Incumbent; Dennis King since March 3, 2025
- Seat: Embassy of Canada, Dublin
- Nominator: Prime Minister of Canada
- Appointer: Governor General of Canada
- Term length: At His Majesty's pleasure
- Inaugural holder: John Hall Kelly
- Formation: December 28, 1939 as High Commissioner

The ambassador of Canada to Ireland is the official representative of the Canadian government to the government of Ireland. The official title for the ambassador is Ambassador Extraordinary and Plenipotentiary of Canada to Ireland. The current ambassador of Canada to Ireland is Dennis King who was appointed on the advice of Prime Minister Justin Trudeau on March 3, 2025.

From 1928 to 1949, Canada sent High Commissioners to the Irish Free State, which was a fellow member of the Commonwealth and a Dominion at the time. With the passage of the Republic of Ireland Act 1948, Ireland left the Commonwealth, and Canada and Ireland have exchanged ambassadors since.

The Embassy of Canada is located at 7-8 Wilton Terrace, Dublin 2, Ireland. The ambassador lives at 22 Oakley Road, Ranelagh a rowhouse in The Triangle area.

From 1954 to 2008, the ambassador lived at Strathmore in Killiney.

== History of diplomatic relations ==
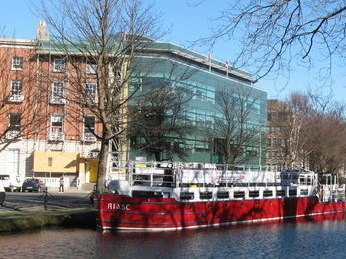
The Canadian Embassy in Dublin, on the Grand Canal

Diplomatic relations between Canada and Ireland was established on September 11, 1939. John Hall Kelly was appointed as Canada's first High Commissioner in Ireland on December 28, 1939. On April 17, 1949, Ireland severed its formal association with the Commonswealth, and the Canadian embassy to the newly independent Ireland was established on July 17, 1949.

== List of ambassadors of Canada to Ireland ==
No.	Name	Term of office			Career	Prime Minister nominated by	Ref.
No.	Name	Start date	PoC.	End date	Career	Prime Minister nominated by	Ref.
—	High Commissioner of Canada to Ireland						
1	John Hall Kelly	December 28, 1939	March 9, 1940	March 9, 1941	Non-Career	W. L. Mackenzie King (1935–1948)	(Note: Died in office) (Note: High Commissioner Kelly is the only Canadian head of mission to be buried in Ireland, where he died in office as High Commissioner.)
2	John Doherty Kearney	July 31, 1941	August 26, 1941		Non-Career	W. L. Mackenzie King (1935–1948)	
3	Merchant M. Mahoney	November 19, 1945		May 4, 1946	Career	W. L. Mackenzie King (1935–1948)	
4	Edward Joseph Garland	May 4, 1946		March 19, 1947	Non-Career	W. L. Mackenzie King (1935–1948)	
5	William Ferdinand Alphonse Turgeon	October 24, 1946	March 19, 1947	June 30, 1949	Non-Career	W. L. Mackenzie King (1935–1948)	
—	Ambassador Extraordinary and Plenipotentiary of Canada to Ireland						
–	David Moffat Johnson (Chargé d'Affaires)	July 17, 1949		December 1949	Career	Louis St. Laurent (1948–1957)	(Note: Canada severed its formal association with Ireland on 17 April 1949. The Canadian Embassy in the Republic of Ireland was established on 17 July 1949, with representatives having the rank of Ambassador.)
6	William Ferdinand Alphonse Turgeon	January 23, 1950	July 17, 1950	April 20, 1955	Non-Career	Louis St. Laurent (1948–1957)	
–	Jean Chapdelaine (Chargé d'Affaires)	January 23, 1950		July 17, 1950	Career	Louis St. Laurent (1948–1957)	
7	Alfred Rive	August 16, 1955		July 7, 1963	Career	Louis St. Laurent (1948–1957)	
–	Paul Vernon McLane (Chargé d'Affaires)	July 7, 1963		March 29, 1965	Career	Lester B. Pearson (1963–1968)	
8	Evan William Thistle Gill	November 6, 1964	March 29, 1965	March 22, 1968	Career	Lester B. Pearson (1963–1968)	
9	James Joachim McCardle	October 8, 1968	January 16, 1969		Career	Pierre Elliott Trudeau (1968–1979 & 1980–1984)	
10	Harold Morton Maddick	May 25, 1972	October 17, 1972	August 31, 1976	Career	Pierre Elliott Trudeau (1968–1979 & 1980–1984)	
11	Edgar Ritchie	June 29, 1976	October 27, 1976	November 7, 1980	Career	Pierre Elliott Trudeau (1968–1979 & 1980–1984)	
12	Alan William Sullivan	February 12, 1981			Career	Pierre Elliott Trudeau (1968–1979 & 1980–1984)	
13	Edgar J. Benson	September 3, 1982	November 25, 1982		Non-Career	Pierre Elliott Trudeau (1968–1979 & 1980–1984)	
–	Gustav Gad Rezek (Chargé d'Affaires)	1985		May 12, 1986	Career	Brian Mulroney (1984–1993)	
14	Dennis McDermott	January 28, 1986	May 15, 1986	May 24, 1989	Non-Career	Brian Mulroney (1984–1993)	
15	Mike Wadsworth	August 24, 1989	October 17, 1989	October 22, 1994	Non-Career	Brian Mulroney (1984–1993)	
16	Barry Michael Mawhinney	July 12, 1994	November 4, 1994	October 4, 1996	Career	Jean Chrétien (1993–2003)	
17	Michael B. Phillips	September 24, 1996	November 5, 1996	September 11, 1998	Career	Jean Chrétien (1993–2003)	
18	Ron Irwin	September 4, 1998	September 24, 1998		Non-Career	Jean Chrétien (1993–2003)	
–	William Gusen (Chargé d'Affaires)	October 10, 2001		August 1, 2002	Career	Jean Chrétien (1993–2003)	
19	Mark Moher	July 2, 2002	September 10, 2002	August 8, 2006	Career	Jean Chrétien (1993–2003)	
20	Chris Westdal	September 20, 2006	October 24, 2006	December 7, 2006	Career	Stephen Harper (2006–2015)	
–	Carl Schwenger (Chargé d'Affaires)	December 7, 2006			Career	Stephen Harper (2006–2015)	
21	Pat Binns	August 13, 2007	October 2, 2007	September 3, 2010	Non-Career	Stephen Harper (2006–2015)	(Note: Ambassadors Binns, Hearn and Vickers are a few Irish-Canadians whom have had the honour of serving in the post.)
22	Loyola Hearn	November 17, 2010	January 12, 2011	August 26, 2014	Non-Career	Stephen Harper (2006–2015)	
23	Kevin Vickers	January 19, 2015	January 21, 2015	March 2, 2019	Non-Career	Stephen Harper (2006–2015)	
24	Nancy Smyth	March 23, 2021	June 17, 2021	August 2024	Career	Justin Trudeau (2015–2025)	
25	Dennis King	March 3, 2025	April 8, 2025		Non-Career	Justin Trudeau (2015–2025)	

== See also ==
- Canada–Ireland relations
- Embassy of Ireland, Ottawa
- Strathmore (Killiney), residence of the Canadian Ambassador to Ireland (1957-2008)
- List of diplomatic missions in Ireland
- List of diplomatic missions of Canada
