= Camille Montpetit =

2nd Deputy Clerk of the House of Commons of Canada
- In office 1998–1999
- Preceded by: Mary Anne Griffith
- Succeeded by: William C. Corbett

Clerk Assistant of the House of Commons of Canada
- In office 1995–1997
- Clerk: Robert Marleau

Camille Montpetit is a former Canadian civil servant. They were the second Deputy Clerk of the House of Commons of Canada, having served from 1998 to 1999. He and Robert Marleau coedited the first edition of House of Commons Procedure and Practice which was published in 2000.

== Published works ==
- Robert, Marleau; Montpetit, Camille, eds. (2000). House of Commons Procedure and Practice. Ottawa: House of Commons. ISBN 978-2-89461378-8.
