= Loyola Hearn =

Canadian politician

The Honourable Loyola Hearn PC ECNL

28th Canadian Ambassador to Ireland
- In office November 19, 2010 – August 2014
- Preceded by: Pat Binns
- Succeeded by: Kevin Vickers

Minister of Fisheries and Oceans
- In office February 6, 2006 – October 30, 2008
- Prime Minister: Stephen Harper
- Preceded by: Geoff Regan
- Succeeded by: Gail Shea

Member of Parliament for St. John's South—Mount Pearl St. John's West (2000-2004)
- In office May 15, 2000 – September 7, 2008
- Preceded by: Charlie Power
- Succeeded by: Siobhán Coady

Member of the Newfoundland House of Assembly for St. Mary's-The Capes
- In office April 6, 1982 – May 3, 1993
- Preceded by: Derrick Hancock
- Succeeded by: Fabian Manning

Personal details
- Born: March 25, 1943 (age 83) Renews, Newfoundland
- Party: Conservative
- Spouse: Maureen Hearn
- Education: Memorial University of Newfoundland; University of New Brunswick
- Profession: School principal

Loyola Hearn, PC ECNL (born March 25, 1943) is a Canadian diplomat and former politician from Newfoundland and Labrador. Hearn is the former Canadian Ambassador to Ireland. He served as a Member of the House of Commons of Canada from 2000 to 2008, and as Minister of Fisheries and Oceans from February 6, 2006 to October 30, 2008.

== Biography ==
=== Early life ===
Hearn was born in the fishing village of Renews, Newfoundland, where he received his early education. After graduating from high school, he began his studies at Memorial University of Newfoundland and the University of New Brunswick.

=== Career ===
After graduating from the university, he started a teaching career in Renews. Hearn then served in the Newfoundland House of Assembly from 1982 to 1993, and served as Minister of Education from 1985 to 1989. Hearn was a candidate in the 1989 Progressive Conservative Leadership Convention to replace outgoing Premier Brian Peckford, the eventual winner was Tom Rideout.

Hearn went on to enter federal politics and was a member of the Conservative Party of Canada in the House of Commons of Canada, representing the riding of St. John's West from 2000 to 2003 and St. John's South—Mount Pearl from 2003 to 2008. He was a member of the Progressive Conservative Party of Canada from 2000 to 2004, and was active in representing the party during its merger discussions with the Canadian Alliance. Those discussions culminated in the merger of the two parties in December 2003, to the Conservative Party of Canada. Hearn served as the first House Leader of the newly created party until it had its first leadership convention.

He has served (either before or after the merger) as the Progressive Conservative Party House Leader, Conservative Party House Leader, Opposition House Leader, Canadian Heritage Critic, Public Works and Government Services Critic, and Critic of the Leader of the Government in the House of Commons.

Following his victory in the 2006 federal election he was named Minister of Fisheries and Oceans on February 6, 2006. As Minister of Fisheries and Oceans, Hearn has been active in defending the controversial east coast seal hunt. In this role, he claimed that several observers from the Humane Society of the United States had been arrested for illegal activity during their campaign against the seal hunt, but was later forced to apologize under threat of a libel suit, as no arrests had in fact taken place.

Hearn has also had to deal with the crises in several rural Newfoundland communities involving the sale of fish plants by Fishery Products International to Ocean Choice, often being in conflict with the provincial government, business and unions.

A few days prior to the dissolution of Parliament in September 2008, Hearn announced that he would not stand for re-election in the 2008 election.

== Ambassador to Ireland ==
On November 19, 2010, Lawrence Cannon, Canada's Minister of Foreign Affairs, announced the appointment of Hearn as Canada's Ambassador to Ireland, succeeding Pat Binns. Hearn's term as ambassador ended on January 19, 2015 and was replaced by Kevin Vickers.

In 2018, Hearn endorsed Ches Crosbie in the 2018 provincial PC leadership race.

Hearn endorsed Peter Mackay in the 2020 Conservative Party of Canada leadership election.

== Personal life ==
Hearn has a son, David (January 1979), and a daughter, Laurita (February 1976), with his wife, Maureen Hearn.

== Electoral record ==
St. John's West – 1993 Canadian federal election
Party	Candidate	Votes	%	±%
Liberal	Jean Payne	24,021		
Progressive Conservative	Loyola Hearn	16,380		
New Democratic	Sharon Walsh	1,740		
Reform	Dana Tucker	1,041		
Natural Law	Guy Harvey	459		

St. John's West By-election – May 15, 2000 Resignation of Charles J. Power
Party	Candidate	Votes	%	±%
Progressive Conservative	Loyola Hearn	11,392		
New Democratic	Greg Malone	11,036		
Liberal	Anthony G. Sparrow	8,032		
Alliance	Frank Hall	1,315		
Independent	E. Sailor White	332		

St. John's West – 2000 Canadian federal election
Party	Candidate	Votes	%	±%
Progressive Conservative	Loyola Hearn	22,959		
Liberal	Chuck Furey	14,137		
New Democratic	Dave Curtis	4,744		
Alliance	Eldon Drost	840		
Natural Law	Michael Rendell	141		

St. John's South—Mount Pearl – 2004 Canadian federal election
Party	Candidate	Votes	%	±%
Conservative	Loyola Hearn	13,330	39.57	-16.2
Liberal	Siobhán Coady	11,879	35.26	+5.0
New Democratic	Peg Norman	7989	23.71	+10.3
Green	Steve Willcott	493	1.46	Ø
Total valid votes		33,691	52.6%	

St. John's South—Mount Pearl – 2006 Canadian federal election
Party	Candidate	Votes	%	±%
Conservative	Loyola Hearn	16,644	44.68	+5.11
Liberal	Siobhán Coady	12,295	33.00	-2.26
New Democratic	Peg Norman	8079	21.69	-2.02
Green	Barry Crozier	235	0.63	-0.83
Total valid votes		37,253	100.0%	
Total rejected ballots		124	0.33%	
Turnout		37,371	58.3%	+5.7%
