= Léon Raymond =

Canadian politician

7th Clerk of the House of Commons
- In office 1949–1967
- Preceded by: Arthur Beauchesne
- Succeeded by: Alistair Fraser

Member of Parliament
- In office June 1949 – August 1949
- Preceded by: new constituency
- Succeeded by: Joseph-Célestin Nadon
- Constituency: Gatineau
- In office June 1945 – June 1949
- Preceded by: Rodolphe Leduc
- Succeeded by: constituency dissolved
- Constituency: Wright

Mayor of Maniwaki
- In office 1941–1942

Personal details
- Born: 30 July 1901 Napierville, Quebec, Canada
- Died: 24 August 1993 (aged 92)
- Party: Liberal
- Education: Université de Montréal
- Profession: Civil law notary

Léon-Joseph Raymond OBE, (30 July 1901 – 24 August 1993) was a Canadian politician, serving as mayor of Maniwaki, Quebec in 1941 and 1942 and as a Liberal party member of the House of Commons of Canada from 1945 to 1949.

Raymond was born at Napierville, Quebec and was educated at Saint-Remi College, the Joliette Seminary and at the University of Montreal where he received his Bachelor of Arts degree. He became a notary and from 1941 to 1945 served as vice-president of the Chambers of Commerce Unionm and from 1938 to 1945 as President of the school commission of Maniwaki.

He married Clementine Péclet on 1 July 1930.

He was first elected to Parliament at the Wright riding in the 1945 general election. With riding boundary changes, Raymond entered the 1949 federal election at the new Gatineau riding and won the seat. He was appointed Clerk of the House of Commons on 5 August 1949 and resigned his seat in Parliament.
