= Montagu Ommanney =

British civil servant

Captain Sir Montagu Frederick Ommanney, GCMG KCB ISO (4 April 1842 – 19 August 1925) was a British civil servant and Head of the Colonial Office 1900–1907.

== Biography ==
Ommanney was born in East Sheen, Surrey, in 1842, the son of Francis Ommanney, of York House, Worcester Park. He was educated at Cheltenham College and the Royal Military Academy, Woolwich.

He was commissioned into the Royal Engineers, from which he retired as a captain in 1878.

He was Private Secretary to the Earl of Carnarvon, Secretary of State for the Colonies, from 1874 to 1878, and from 1877 served as a Crown Agent for the Colonies. In 1900 he was appointed Permanent Under-Secretary of State for the Colonies, and thus head of the Colonial Office. He resigned in 1907.

He was a Director of the North Borneo Company.

== Honours ==
Ommanney was appointed a Companion of the Order of St Michael and St George (CMG) in the 1882 Birthday Honours, knighted as a Knight Commander of the Order (KCMG) in the New Year Honours list 1890, was appointed Secretary of the Order in 1900, and was promoted to a Knight Grand Cross (GCMG) of the order in the 1904 Birthday Honours list. He later served as a King of Arms of the Order of St Michael and St George 1909–1924. He was appointed a Knight Commander of the Order of the Bath (KCB) in the 1901 Birthday Honours list, and invested as such by King Edward VII at St James's Palace on 17 December 1901. He received the Imperial Service Order (ISO) in 1903.

== Family ==
He married, in 1866, Charlotte Helen Ommanney, daughter of his relative Octavius Ommanney. They had several children, including Dorothy Helen Ommanney, who married Douglas Champion Jones, of the Royal Engineers.

His grandson, Lieutenant-Commander Owen Gream Ommanney served as a British colonial administrator in British North Borneo.

Government offices
Preceded by Sir Edward Wingfield	Permanent Under-Secretary of State for the Colonies; 1900–1907	Succeeded by Sir Francis Hopwood
