= 1882 Birthday Honours =

Appointments by Queen Victoria to various orders and honours

The 1882 Birthday Honours were appointments by Queen Victoria to various orders and honours to reward and highlight good works by citizens of the British Empire. The appointments were made to celebrate the official birthday of the Queen, and were published in The London Gazette on 23 May, 24 May and 2 June 1882.

The recipients of honours are displayed here as they were styled before their new honour, and arranged by honour, with classes (Knight, Knight Grand Cross, etc.) and then divisions (Military, Civil, etc.) as appropriate.

== United Kingdom and British Empire ==
=== Baronetcies ===
- The Right Honourable John Whittaker Ellis, Lord Mayor of the City of London

=== The Most Honourable Order of the Bath ===
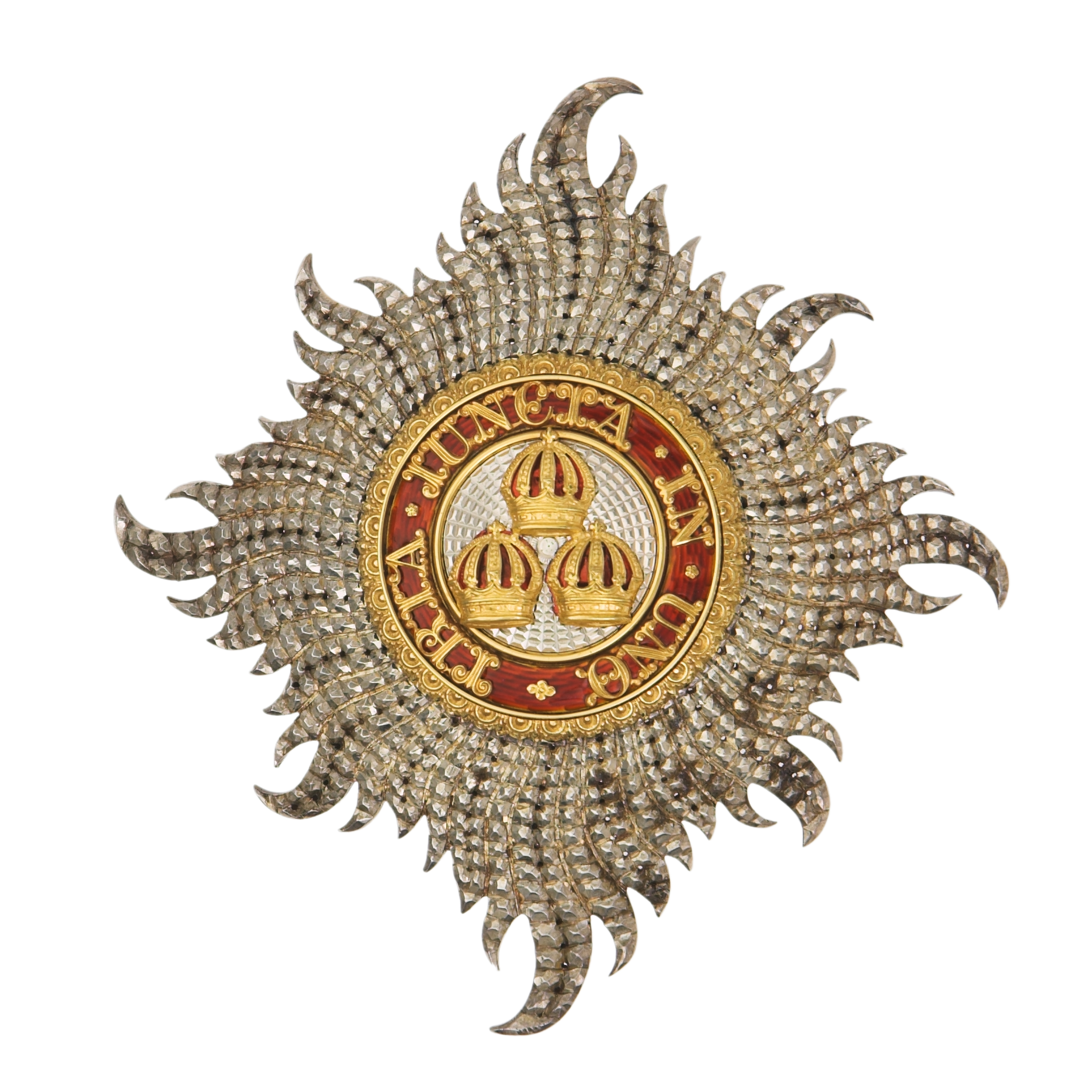
Civilian star of the Knight Grand Cross of the Order of the Bath

==== Knight Commander of the Order of the Bath (KCB) ====
===== Civil Division =====
- James Caird CB Senior Copyhold, Inclosure, and Tithe Commissioner
- Ralph Wood Thompson CB Undersecretary of State for the War Department

==== Companion of the Order of the Bath (CB) ====
===== Civil Division =====
- Robert George Wyndham Herbert, Undersecretary of State for the Colonies
- Charles Lennox Peel, Clerk of the Councils Colonel Thomas Inglis, of the Royal Engineers
- Henry Jenkyns, Assistant Parliamentary Counsel

=== The Most Exalted Order of the Star of India ===
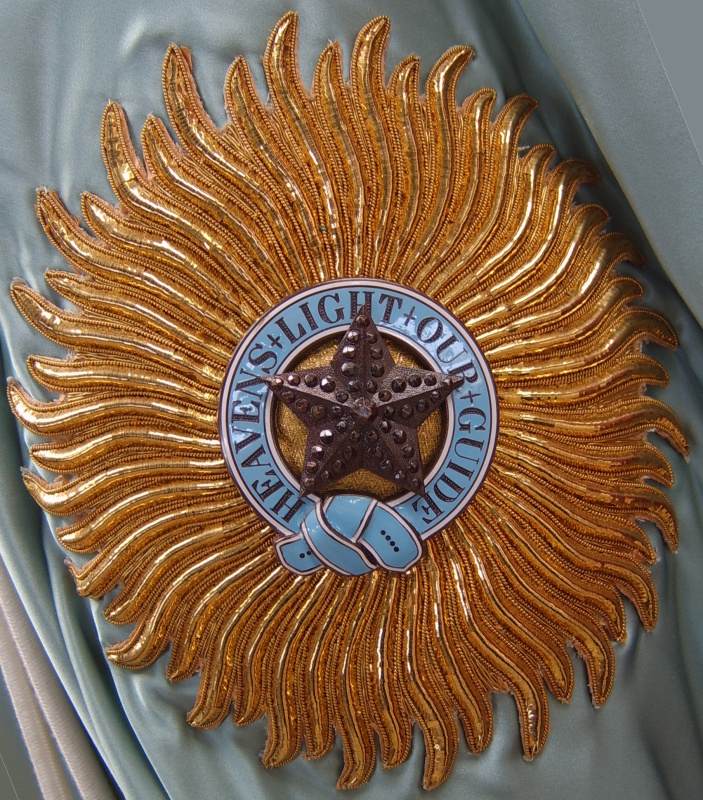
Star of a Knight Grand Commander of the Most Exalted Order of the Star of India

==== Knight Grand Commander (GCSI) ====
- His Highness the Maharajah of Travancore
- His Highness Nawab Ikbal-ud-dowlah of Oudh (Baghdad)

==== Knight Commander (KCSI) ====
- The Maharajah Jotendro Mohun Tagore CSI
- Lieutenant-Colonel Oliver Beauchamp Coventry St. John CSI Royal (late Bengal) Engineers, late Resident at Kandahar

==== Companion (CSI) ====
- Lieutenant-Colonel Edward Charles Ross, Bombay Staff Corps, Political Resident in the Persian Gulf
- William Hudleston, Madras Civil Service, Member of the Council of the Governor of Madras
- Charles Paget Carmichael, Bengal Civil Service, Senior Member of the Board of Revenue, North Western Provinces
- Edward Francis Harrison, late Bengal Civil Service, formerly Comptroller-General, Calcutta

=== The Most Distinguished Order of Saint Michael and Saint George ===
Star of the Order of Saint Michael and Saint George

==== Knight Commander of the Order of St Michael and St George (KCMG) ====
- Cornelius Hendricksen Kortright CMG late Governor of the Colony of British Guiana
- William Brampton Gurdon CB for services on Special Missions in 1879 and 1881 to South Africa for the Settlement of Financial Questions
- Colonel William Bellairs CB for services in South Africa
- Colonel George Stoddart Whitmore CMG formerly Commandant of Local Forces in New Zealand, and Member of the Legislative Council of that Colony
- Saul Samuel CMG Agent-General in London for New South Wales, and previously Member of several Administrations in that Colony
- Count Giorgio Serafino Ciantar (Paleologo), Barone di San Giovanni CMG President of the Assembly of the Maltese Nobility
- John Hall, lately First Minister in New Zealand

==== Companion of the Order of St Michael and St George (CMG) ====
- Alfred Patrick, lately Clerk of the House of Commons of the Dominion of Canada
- Lieutenant-Colonel John Stoughton Dennis, late Deputy of the Minister of the Interior in the Dominion of Canada
- Lieutenant-Colonel Francis Walter de Winton RA Military Secretary to the Governor-General of Canada
- Montague Frederick Ommanney, one of the Crown Agents for the Colonies
- William Turner Thiselton-Dyer FRS Assistant Director of the Royal Botanic Gardens, Kew, for services rendered to Colonial Governments
- Saverio Marchese di Piro, Major of the Royal Malta Fencible Artillery
- Henry Heylyn Hayter, Government Statist in the Colony of Victoria
- Cornelius Alfred Moloney, Colonial Secretary of the Gold Coast Colony
- Gerhardus M. Rudolf, Resident Magistrate in Natal
- Melmoth Osborn, British Resident in Zululand
- John Forrest, Deputy Surveyor-General of Western Australia, for distinguished services in exploration
- Victor Alexander Williamson, for special services in Mauritius and Fiji

=== The Most Eminent Order of the Indian Empire ===
==== Companion (CIE) ====
- William Mackinnon
- Syud Lutf Ali Khan
- Moung Shway Kyee, Police Department, British Burmah
- Rana Shankar Bakhsh Singh Bahadur, Honorary Assistant Commissioner in Oudh
- Deputy Surgeon-General William James Moore, Honorary Surgeon to the Viceroy of India
- Edward Ronald Douglas, Deputy Director-General of the Post Office of India
