= Bev Koester =

Lieutenant-Commander (Ret'd) Bev Koester OC, CD

Clerk of the House of Commons of Canada
- In office 1980–1987
- Preceded by: Alistair Fraser
- Succeeded by: Robert Marleau

Clerk Assistant of the House of Commons of Canada
- In office 1975–1979 Serving with Marcel Pelletier

Clerk of the Legislative Assembly of Saskatchewan
- In office July 1, 1960 – September 1, 1969
- Preceded by: George Stephen
- Succeeded by: Gordon Barnhart

Personal details
- Born: Charles Beverley Koester; January 13, 1926 Regina, Saskatchewan
- Died: February 1, 1998 (aged 72) Kingston, Ontario
- Education: Royal Roads Military College; University of Saskatchewan; University of Alberta
- Occupation: Naval officer, academic, civil servant

Military service
- Branch/service: Royal Canadian Navy
- Years of service: c. 1944–1960
- Rank: Lieutenant-commander

Charles Beverley "Bev" Koester, OC CD (January 13, 1926 – February 1, 1998) was a Canadian naval officer, civil servant and Clerk of the House of Commons of Canada.

Born in Regina, Saskatchewan, he graduated from the Royal Canadian Naval College at Royal Roads, British Columbia in 1944. He served during the Second World War in Scotland, and in 1945 was involved in the liberation of Oslo and Copenhagen. He stayed in the Navy until 1960, retiring as a lieutenant commander. He attended the University of Saskatchewan and the University of Alberta and taught history at the University of Regina, later becoming head of the history department. He was the author of Footprints in Time – Saskatchewan (House of Grant, Canada, 1965); Mr. Davin MP (Western Producer Prairie Books, 1980); The Measure of the Man (Western Producer Prairie Books, 1976) and the editor of Bourinot's Rules of Order, a handbook on Canadian parliamentary procedure.

From 1960 to 1969, he was an officer of the Legislative Assembly of Saskatchewan as a Clerk Assistant and a Clerk. From 1969 to 1975 he taught history at the University of Regina. In 1975, he became Clerk Assistant at the Canadian House of Commons and was appointed Clerk in 1980. He was the first clerk of the Canadian House of Commons who was a career civil servant. During his time as clerk, television cameras were introduced into the House of Commons. He retired in 1987. He also served twice as temporary senior Clerk of the British House of Commons, becoming the first clerk from a Commonwealth country to serve as clerk in Britain.

In 1989, he was made an Officer of the Order of Canada.

He died in Kingston, Ontario.
