= John George Bourinot (younger) =

Canadian historian and journalist (1836–1902)

Sir John George Bourinot KCMG FRSC
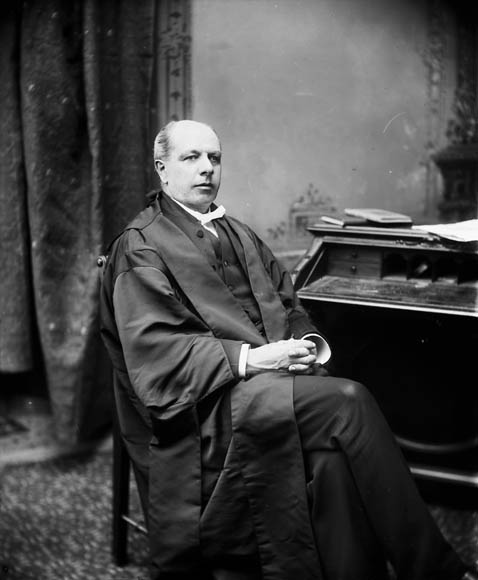
- Bourinot photographed in 1888 by William James Topley

3rd Clerk of the House of Commons of Canada
- In office December 1880 – October 1902
- Preceded by: Alfred Patrick
- Succeeded by: Thomas Barnard Flint

11th President of the Royal Society of Canada
- In office 1892–1893
- Preceded by: Joseph-Clovis-Kemner Laflamme
- Succeeded by: George Mercer Dawson

Personal details
- Born: October 24, 1836 Sydney, Nova Scotia
- Died: February 13, 1902 (aged 65) Ottawa, Ontario, Canada
- Resting place: Beechwood Cemetery
- Children: Arthur Bourinot
- Parent: John George Bourinot
- Occupation: Journalist, historian, parliamentary official

Sir John George Bourinot, KCMG FRSC (October 24, 1836 – October 13, 1902) was a Canadian journalist, historian, and civil servant, sole author of the first Canadian effort in 1884 to document Parliamentary Procedure and Practice, and remembered as an expert in parliamentary procedure and constitutional law.

== Life ==
Born in Sydney, Nova Scotia, he was the oldest son of John Bourinot. He was educated at Sydney before enrolling at Trinity College, Toronto, in 1854. Although he was a good student, he left the university two years later and worked as a parliamentary reporter for a Toronto newspaper. In 1860, he was in Halifax, where he founded, together with Joseph C. Crosskill, his own newspaper, the Evening Reporter. In May 1867, Bourinot left this newspaper and worked as a freelance writer for some time, until he secured a job as a clerk at the Senate of Canada in May 1869. In the following years, he steadily advanced through various grades until he was appointed chief clerk of the House of Commons of Canada in December 1880. a post he would occupy until his death 22 years later.

A founding member of the Royal Society of Canada, he also acted as its honorary secretary, and in 1892 served as president of the society. He wrote many books political history, some of which were considered references for decades to come. His Parliamentary Procedure and Practice in Canada (Montréal, 1884) is considered a standard work. How Canada is governed (Toronto, 1895) was a widely used textbook, and Canada under British rule, 1760 – 1900 (Cambridge, England, 1900) was also popular. He also wrote books about the history of Nova Scotia, and several more on constitutional law. He also created the work that was posthumously to be called Bourinot's Rules of Order.

Bourinot was an advocate of Imperial Federation and a proponent of both a national university and library of Canada. He also was in favour of the right of women to higher education. In his later life, Bourinot received honorary degrees from many Canadian universities and was created CMG in 1890 and KCMG in 1898. He died in Ottawa, Ontario and was buried in Beechwood Cemetery there.

== Honours ==
Bourinot was elected a member of the American Antiquarian Society in 1893.

== Works ==
- The Intellectual Development In The Canadian People, (1881)
- French Canada, (1887)
- Our Intellectual Strength And Weakness, (1893)
- Sea, Forest, And Prairie..., (1893)
- Canada, (1897)
- Builders Of Nova Scotia, (1900)
- Canada Under British Rule 1760-1900, (1900)
- Constitutional History, (1901)
- Lord Elgin, (1903)
- Canada [2nd edition with William H INGRAM], (1922)
- How Canada Is Governed, (?)
- Catalogue Of The Library Of The Late Sir John Bourinot, (1906)
- Parliamentary Procedure And Government In Canada, (?/?)
- Cape Breton And Its Memorials Of The French Régime, (?)

Government offices
Preceded by Alfred Patrick	Clerk of the House of Commons of Canada; 1880–1902	Succeeded by Thomas Barnard Flint
Professional and academic associations
Preceded by Joseph-Clovis-Kemner Laflamme	President of the Royal Society of Canada; 1892–1893	Succeeded by George Mercer Dawson
