= William Burns Lindsay Jr. =

Canadian lawyer

William Burns Lindsay

1st Clerk of the House of Commons of Canada
- In office 1867–1872
- Preceded by: New office
- Succeeded by: Alfred Patrick

Clerk of the Legislative Assembly of the Province of Canada
- In office 1862–1867
- Preceded by: William Burns Lindsay Sr.
- Succeeded by: Office abolished

Personal details
- Born: 1824 Quebec City, Lower Canada
- Died: 1872 (aged 47–48)
- Parent: William Burns Lindsay Sr.
- Profession: Lawyer

William Burns Lindsay Jr. (1824–1872) was Clerk of the House of Commons of Canada, from 1867 to 1872. He served as the last Clerk of the Legislative Assembly of the Province of Canada from 1862 to 1867, after having served the assembly as Clerk Assistant from 1841.
