= Distinguished Public Service Medal =

Distinguished Public Service Medal may be one of the following decorations of the United States:

- Army Distinguished Public Service Medal
- Department of Defense Medal for Distinguished Public Service
- Merchant Marine Distinguished Service Medal
- Mineralogical Society of America Distinguished Public Service Medal
- NASA Distinguished Service Medal
- NASA Distinguished Public Service Medal (awarded to non-government personnel)
- National Intelligence Distinguished Public Service Medal
- Public Health Service Distinguished Service Medal

Distinguished Public Service Award may be one of the following decorations of the United States:

- Coast Guard Distinguished Public Service Award
- Navy Distinguished Public Service Award
- Secretary of the Air Force Distinguished Public Service Award
- Secretary's Distinguished Service Award from the United States Department of State

== See also ==
- Awards and decorations of the United States government
