= Embassy of Ireland, Ottawa =

Diplomatic mission of Ireland to Canada

Embassy of Ireland in Ottawa
- Location: 150 Metcalfe Street; Suite 1700; Ottawa, Ontario; K2P 1P1
- Coordinates: 45.4213°N 75.6971°W
- Ambassador: Dr. Eamonn C. McKee
- Website: Irish Embassy, Canada

The Embassy of Ireland is Ireland's embassy in Canada. It is located in the city's downtown core of Ottawa, Ontario, Canada.

Dr. Eamonn C. McKee has served as Ambassador since October 2020.

Ireland has consulates-general in Vancouver and Toronto, as well as honorary consulates in the provinces of Alberta (Calgary and Edmonton), Québec (Quebec City), Nova Scotia (Halifax) and Newfoundland and Labrador (St. John's).

== Ambassador's residence ==
The Irish Ambassador's official residence in Canada is located at 291 Park Road in Ottawa's upscale Rockcliffe Park neighborhood.

Originally constructed in 1942 by Canadian architect Henry Gordon Hughes, the building was purchased by the Irish Government on 27 September 1968 for a total of £48,868.

The building underwent extensive renovation in 2009 which added two new wings, at both the east and west ends of the original building. This renovation expanded the property to 12,000 square feet (1,100 m^{2}) for a total cost of CA$6,000,000.

== See also ==
- List of ambassadors of Ireland to Canada
