= Clerk of the House of Commons (Canada) =

Canadian parliamentary office holder

- Incumbent; Eric Janse since 2023
- Appointer: Governor General in Council
- Term length: At His Majesty's pleasure
- Formation: 1867
- First holder: William Burns Lindsay
- Deputy: Deputy Clerk of the House of Commons
- Salary: $242,800–285,600 (2023)

The clerk of the House of Commons is the senior procedural and administrative officer in the House of Commons of Canada.

The duties performed by the Clerk of the House of Commons include advising the Speaker of the House of Commons and Members of Parliament on matters of parliamentary procedure. As well, the Clerk is involved in the management of the House of Commons. The office is modelled on the Clerk of the House of Commons of the United Kingdom. Prior to the establishment of this office, there was the Clerk of the Legislative Assembly of the Province of Canada.

The current Clerk is Eric Janse.

== History ==
The thirteenth century saw the emergence of the Clerk as a profession in England. At that time, they were employed to record the decisions made by kings and kings' advisors. It was not until 1361 that the first Clerk of the House of Commons was officially appointed by the Crown. The main duty of the early Clerks of the House consisted of reading petitions and bills, while later they started to record the House's proceedings. Notes on proceedings evolved to journals, which aim to keep track of the decisions and other important transaction of the House.

The House of Commons of Canada inherited the British parliamentary tradition. In 1867, William Burns Lindsay became the first Clerk of the House of Commons of Canada. Before Confederation, he served as the Clerk of the Legislative Assembly of the Province of Canada. From 2014 to 2016, the Deputy Clerk Marc Bosc served the role of the Acting Clerk on an interim basis during the House of Commons Clerk Audrey O'Brien's medical leave period. He continued to remain in that position until the appointment of Charles Robert in 2017.

== Appointment and duties ==
The Clerk of the House of Commons are filled through governor-in-council appointments, pursuant to the Public Service Employment Act. In 2001, the House made a modification to the appointment process according to a recommendation contained in the First Report of the Special Committee on the Modernization and Improvement of the Procedures of the House of Commons. From then on, the Standing Committee on Procedure and House Affairs needs to conduct a review of the proposed appointee after the government makes the nomination. This committee then reports to the House of Commons, followed by a ratification vote by the House. This process was first applied when proposing the appointment of Audrey O'Brien in 2005.

As well as advising the Speaker of the House of Commons and Members of Parliament on matters of parliamentary procedure, the Clerk is involved in the management of the House of Commons. The procedural responsibility of the Clerk is to maintain and keep custody of the House's proceedings and other important documents. Before each sitting of the House, the Clerk is required to provide the official agenda for the day’s proceedings to the Speaker. At the beginning of a Parliament, all duly elected Members and the Members appointed to the Board of Internal Economy need to swear an oath of allegiance administered by the Clerk. With the aim of providing assistance to all Members regardless of party affiliation, the Clerk is expected to act with impartiality and discretion all the time. The Clerk of the Senate fulfills a similar role in the Senate of Canada.

In the House of Commons Chamber, the Clerk’s Table is at the north end of the floor, in front of the Speaker’s Chair. The Clerk of the House of Commons sits at the head of the Table, with Clerks-at-the-Table on either side. The dress code of the Clerk is to wear a black robe.

== List of Clerks of the House of Commons ==
No.	Image	Name	Term	Note
1		William Burns Lindsay	1867–1872	
2		Alfred Patrick	1873–1880	
3		John George Bourinot	1880–1902	
4		Thomas Barnard Flint	1902–1917	
5		William Barton Northrup	1918–1924	
6		Arthur Beauchesne	1925–1949	
7		Léon-Joseph Raymond	1949–1967	
8		Alistair Fraser	1967–1979	
9		Charles Beverley Koester	1979–1987	
10		Robert Marleau	1987–2000	
11		William C. Corbett	2000–2005	
12		Audrey O'Brien	2005–2016	
–		Marc Bosc	2014–2017	Acting Clerk
13		Charles Robert	2017–2023	
–		Eric Janse	2023–present	Acting (January 2023 - December 2023)
