= Deputy Clerk of the House of Commons =

- Incumbent; Michel Patrice and Eric Janse
- Reports to: Clerk of the House of Commons
- Appointer: Governor General in Council
- Term length: At His Majesty's pleasure
- Formation: 1987
- First holder: Mary Ann Griffith
- Salary: $147,400–173,300 (2013)

The deputy clerk of the House of Commons acts as assistant to the clerk in the administration of the House of Commons of Canada. The post was created in 1987. In 2017, the post was split into two: a deputy clerk for procedure and a deputy clerk for administration.

== List of deputy clerks ==
- 1987–1997: Mary Anne Griffith
- 1998–1999: Camille Montpetit
- 1999: William C. Corbett
- 2000–2005: Audrey O'Brien
- 2005–2014: Marc Bosc
- 2014–2017: André Gagnon (acting)
- 2017–2021: André Gagnon (procedure)
- 2017–present: Michel Patrice (administration)
- 2021–present: Eric Janse (procedure)
