= Audrey O'Brien =

Canadian parliamentary official

Audrey O'Brien CM

12th Clerk of the Canadian House of Commons
- In office 11 October 2005 – 2015
- Governors General: Adrienne Clarkson; Michaëlle Jean; David Johnston
- Prime Minister: Paul Martin; Stephen Harper; Justin Trudeau
- Preceded by: William C. Corbett
- Succeeded by: Marc Bosc (acting)

Personal details
- Occupation: Parliamentary official

Audrey Elizabeth O'Brien CM was the 12th, and first female, Clerk of the House of Commons of Canada. She was appointed in 2005. The Clerk of the House is a Governor-in-Council nomination and is the chief executive of the administration of the House of Commons. In December 2015, she was appointed as a Member of the Order of Canada for her contributions in the administration of the House of Commons.
