= List of clerks assistants of the Canadian House of Commons =

This is a list of Clerks Assistant of the House of Commons of Canada.

The current Clerks Assistant are:

- Marie-Andrée Lajoie (2003–present)
- Eric Janse (2005–present)
- André Gagnon (2005–present)

Past Clerks Assistant are:

- Alfred Patrick 1867–1873
- Eugène Urgele Piché 1873–1879
- Sir John George Bourinot 1879–1880
- Jean Phillippe Leprohon 1880–1882
- François Fortunat Rouleau 1882–1897
- Jean-Baptiste René Laplante 1897–1916
- Arthur Beauchesne 1916–1924
- Thomas Munro Fraser 1925–1942
- Charles Walter Boyce 1942–1945
- Roy Theodore Graham 1945–1949
- J. T. Dun (Acting) 1949–1949
- Edward Russell Hopkins 1949–1952
- Thomas R. Montgomery 1952–1964
- Alistair Fraser 1966–1967
- J. Gordon Dubroy 1968–1974
- Marcel R. Pelletier 1969–1982
- C. Beverly Koester 1975–1979
- Robert Marleau 1983–1987
- Phillip Alan Charles Landry 1983–1996
- Mary Ann Griffith 1984–1987
- Camille Montpetit 1995–1997
- William C. Corbett 1997–1999
- Audrey Elizabeth O'Brien 1997–2000
- Marc Bosc 2000–2005
- André Gagnon (Acting) 2005–2005
