= WHM (disambiguation) =

WHM may refer to:

- WebHost Manager, a web-based tool used for server administration
- Washim railway station, the station code WHM
- Whimple railway station, the station code WHM
- Women's History Month, an annual declared month
  - Australian Women's History Forum
- World Heritage Maker, a rendering program for mobile applications using Augmented reality technology
- Wim Hof Method, a combination of frequent cold exposure, breathing techniques and meditation
