= Discharge petition =

United States parliamentary procedure

In United States parliamentary procedure, a discharge petition is a means of bringing a bill out of committee and to the floor for consideration without a report from the committee by "discharging" the committee from further consideration of a bill or resolution.

Discharge petitions are most often associated with the U.S. House of Representatives, though many state legislatures in the United States have similar procedures. There, discharge petitions are used when the chair of a committee refuses to place a bill or resolution on the committee's agenda: by never reporting a bill, the matter will never leave the committee, and the full House will not be able to consider it. The discharge petition, and the threat of one, gives more power to individual members of the House and removes a small amount of power from the leadership and committee chairs. In the U.S. House, successful discharge petitions are rare, as the signatures of an absolute majority of House members are required.

== In the U.S. House of Representatives ==
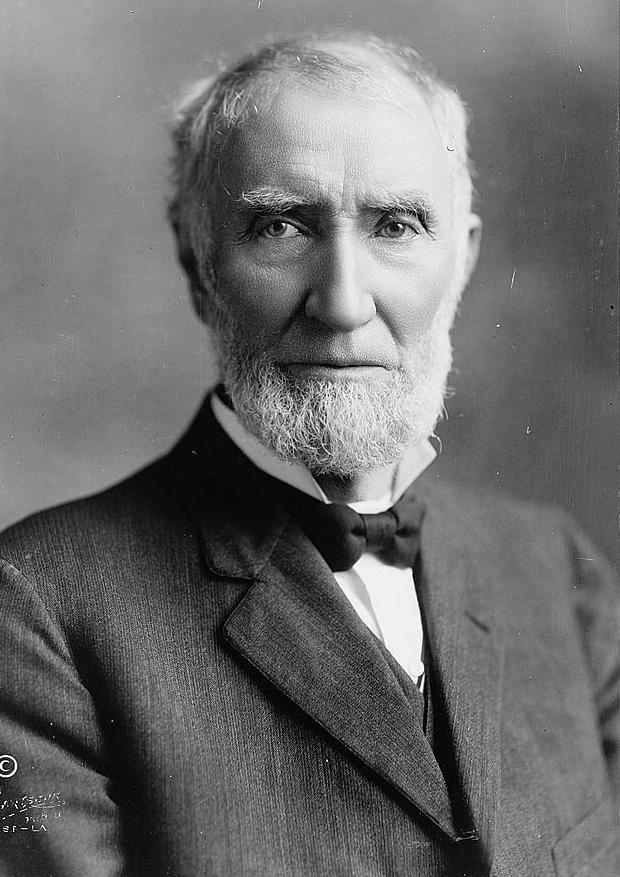
Speaker Joseph G. Cannon faced a revolt from his own party, which curtailed the Speaker's powers via the discharge petition and stripped him of direct leadership of the Rules Committee.

=== History and process ===
An early form of the discharge petition was introduced into U.S. House rules in 1910 as part of a series of measures intended to check the power of the disliked Speaker Joseph Gurney Cannon (R–Illinois). The modern version, however, was adopted in 1931 by the 71st House. In 1935, the rules were changed so the number of signatures required to force a vote went from one-third of the chamber (145 votes) to an absolute majority (218 votes).

Originally, signatories to a discharge petition were secret. Only once the petition acquired a majority would the clerk announce who signed. In 1993, the procedure was changed to make every step of the process public, with signers published in the Congressional Record. This change was spearheaded by then–Rep. Jim Inhofe (R–Oklahoma).

There are three basic forms of discharge petition:

- Directly on an unreported measure. This makes it difficult to amend, which may be considered a benefit or a drawback. The committee to be discharged can circumvent this to a degree by reporting the measure.
- On a "special rule" resolution providing that the unreported measure be recalled from committee and considered. This is the most common variety in modern times.
- On a "special rule" resolution providing that a reported measure that was never called for floor consideration be considered.

Once the House acts on a discharge motion, any further discharge petitions on the same subject are precluded for the remainder of the session of Congress (until the calendar year's close, normally). This is only relevant if the petition succeeds but the bill is rejected anyway, despite a majority of the House apparently wishing to bypass the committee. If the motion is budget-related, then the Committee of the Whole is convened to amend it.

A discharge petition may only be brought after a measure has sat in committee for at least 30 legislative days (Note: Each adjournment counts as a day, so if Congress is in recess, no legislative days pass.) without being reported; if the petition is on a "special rule" resolution submitted to the Rules Committee, then the period is seven days instead. Once the requisite number of signatures is reached, the petition is placed on the Discharge Calendar, which is privileged business on the second and fourth Mondays of each month. This layover is waived during the last six days of a session before sine die adjournment. At the end of each session of Congress, any discharge petitions remaining unresolved or lacking the required number of signatures are removed from consideration.

Between 1931 and 2003, 563 discharge petitions were filed, of which only 47 obtained the required majority of signatures. The House voted for discharge 26 times and passed 19 of the measures, but only two have become law. However, the threat of a discharge petition has caused the leadership to relent several times; such petitions are dropped only because the leadership allowed the bill to move forward, rendering the petition superfluous. Overall, either the petition was completed or else the measure made it to the floor by other means in 16 percent of cases.

=== Usage ===
Discharge petitions are rare. A successful discharge petition embarrasses the leadership; as such, members of the majority party are hesitant to support something that would make the Speaker and their own leaders look bad. (Naturally, the minority party will often support discharge petitions precisely to embarrass the leadership.) Furthermore, since the signers of a petition are not private, majority party members are pressured not to sign, and open themselves up to retribution from the leadership should they disobey.

When signing of a petition was secret (or, more specifically, confirmation that it was signed was secret, as a Representative could claim whatever they liked), petitions were generally only used for serious discontent in the majority. The secrecy also meant that members could claim to be for a piece of legislation while at the same time taking no action to force a vote on such legislation. With this secrecy removed, it became more difficult to dissemble in such a way; it also opened signers to more direct retribution from the leadership. Under the old system, if a petition was unsuccessful, the leadership would never know if a particular Representative signed the petition. If it was successful, all the "defectors" would at least be in the same boat. With open signing, the leadership can exert maximum pressure on stopping the last few signatures. Those who make the last few signatures open themselves to especially severe payback, as early signers could argue privately that they were only posturing and did not think the petition would ever pass. In 1994, a strong counter-campaign from the House leadership helped stop the proposal of William Zeliff (R–New Hampshire) and Rob Andrews (D–New Jersey) of "A–Z spending cuts", for example; the proposal received 204 signatures, but could not muster the last 14.

The removal of secrecy also encourages discharge petitions that exist merely to take a public stand on an issue. Since secrecy was removed in the U.S. House, thirty petitions have attained 60 signatures or fewer.

=== Since 1985 ===
Successful discharge petitions, in which the process was carried to its conclusion, rather than the bill dying or the leadership allowing the bill out of committee (since as noted above, the leadership has simply relented on some bills with pending petitions) are very rare.

In 1985, a discharge petition was filed on the Firearm Owners Protection Act, known as McClure–Volkmer. The Act was a scaling back of gun control legislation that made it easier for gun shows to operate without government interference. The Senate passed the bill, but House Judiciary chair Peter W. Rodino, Jr. (D–New Jersey) declared it "dead on arrival". In response, the National Rifle Association launched a strong campaign to pass the bill in the House via discharge petition. Rather than let the Senate version of the bill out of committee, Rodino instead proffered a compromise piece of legislation with William J. Hughes (D–New Jersey). However, the discharge petition succeeded and the Senate version was passed after minor amendments were added.

In 1993, the Discharge Petition Disclosure Bill was passed by the House, which made the rule change requiring public disclosure of signers. This bill was itself filed with a discharge petition. The Balanced Budget Amendment received 218 signatures twice, in 1992 and 1993; however, it did not pass the House.

In 2002, the discharge petition was successfully used to pass the Bipartisan Campaign Reform Act, known as McCain–Feingold in the Senate and Shays–Meehan in the House. Starting in 1997, several attempts were made to bring it to the floor via the discharge petition. After it finally passed the House, the Senate approved it by a vote of 60 to 40, narrowly overcoming a filibuster.

In October 2015, a bipartisan group successfully used a discharge petition to force a vote on a bill to re-authorize the Export–Import Bank of the United States.

In the 118th Congress (2023–2025), Republicans had a very slim majority and repeated attritions between its factions, some of which occasionally joined with the Democrats (then the minority party) to support certain discharge petitions. In May 2024, a Freedom Caucus-headed petition on a disaster relief tax bill received enough signatures. It was successfully enacted after passing the House by a vote of 382 to 7, the Senate by unanimous consent, and signed into law by President Biden. Later that year, in September 2024, a second discharge petition reached the required 218 signatures, bringing forward a bill that eliminated existing provisions that reduced Social Security benefits to some seniors, which passed the House by a vote of 352 to 75, passed the Senate by a vote 76 to 20, and, signed into law by President Biden.

The Republicans had an even smaller majority in the 119th Congress (2025–2027), leading to increased use of the petition. Specifically:

- In March 2025, a petition to make a House rule to allow proxy voting by members who gave birth, or with spouses who did so, reached the requisite number of signatures. The petition was tabled in April 2025 after the House leadership approved rules to establish vote pairing.
- A second petition reached the required majority in November 2025 to bring forward the Epstein Files Transparency Act. The bill passed the House on November 18, 2025 by a vote of 427 to 1, formally passed the Senate by unanimous consent on November 19, 2025, and was signed by President Trump later that day.
- A third petition reached the required majority in November 2025 to bring forward a bill restoring collective bargaining rights for most federal employees. The bill passed the House on December 11, 2025 by a vote of 231 to 195.
- A fourth petition reached the required majority in December 2025 to bring forward a bill authorizing a three-year extension of the enhanced tax credits under the Affordable Care Act. It passed the House on January 8, 2026 by a vote of 230 to 196.
- A fifth petition reached the required majority in March 2026 to bring forward a bill directing the Department of Homeland Security to designate Haiti for Temporary Protected Status. The bill passed the House on April 16, 2026 by a vote of 224-204.
- A sixth petition reached the required majority in May 2026 to bring forward a bill to providence financial assistance to Ukraine, add new economic sanctions on Russia, and help to fund Ukrainian reconstruction. The bill passed the House on June 4, 2026 by a vote of 226 to 195.
- A seventh petition reached the required majority in May 2026 to bring forward a bill to amend the National Labor Relations Act to impose strict federal timelines and mandatory binding arbitration on first union contract negotiations. The bill passed the House on June 9, 2026 by a vote of 230 to 193.
- An eighth petition reached the required majority in September 2026 to bring forward a bill that allows a veteran with a combat-related disability to receive retirement pay, without reduction, concurrently with their disability compensation. The bill passed the House on November 12, 2026 by a vote of 392 to 18.
- A ninth petition reached the required majority in November 2026 to bring forward the Epstein Files Transparency Act II.

== Related procedures in the U.S. Senate ==
The Congressional Review Act creates an expedited process for Congressional review of executive branch regulations (often used against "midnight regulations"), providing an especially quick timetable for consideration of a joint resolution to overturn a particular regulation. As part of this process, 30 Senators may immediately discharge a Senate committee from consideration of the disapproval resolution by signing a so-called discharge petition; this allows the resolution to be placed on the Senate calendar and receive a vote by the full Senate. While using the same term as the House process, its use in the United States Senate has few similarities to the House process described above and is limited only to disapproval resolutions created under the conditions of this congressional review process.

The actual closest procedure to a discharge petition in the Senate is the so-called motion to discharge a bill or resolution from Committee, which can be introduced by a senator during morning business. After two legislative days have passed (including the one on which the motion to discharge is first proposed), the Senator can call up the motion.

The distinct procedure of a "discharge resolution" allows non-controversial measures to forgo a committee and be submitted to a voice vote, presuming unanimous consent.

== In U.S. state legislatures ==
Versions of the discharge petition vary widely in U.S. state legislatures. Some use petitions like the House, though others allow a motion to be made to discharge the committee, forcing legislators to vote. The threshold for discharge also varies. For instance, Wisconsin has similar rules to the House; a simple majority is required to succeed, though a motion or a petition are both acceptable. The Kansas Legislature requires 56-percent approval (70 members). Pennsylvania allowed only 30 percent of its members to recall a measure from committee for a time. This was changed in 1925 to a majority, drastically curtailing the number of recalls; still, only 25 (about 10 percent) petition-signers are required to force a motion to be voted on by the floor. Though technically a vote on whether the bill can proceed, the bill's supporters usually claimed that the vote was a vote on the bill itself, providing opportunities to the minority party to, at the least, force the majority party to be put on record as opposing a popular bill.

== Outside the United States ==
Analogs to the discharge petition in Westminster systems do not exist. Discharge petitions are used to try to get around obstructionism by the majority party, as a last resort to get a floor vote on an Act/bill. Anybody who is chosen in the private members' ballot can bring a bill to a floor vote in a Westminster system, so a discharge petition process is viewed as unnecessary. Furthermore, parts of the legislative calendar in many countries (Australia, Canada, Germany etc.) are reserved for the opposition agenda, under the control of the Leader of the Opposition and other opposition parties.
