= Women and Gender Equality Canada =

Department of the Government of Canada

- Femmes et Égalité des genres Canada

Department overview
- Formed: 1976
- Jurisdiction: Government of Canada
- Employees: 181 (March 2019)
- Annual budget: $72.1 million CAD (2018–19)
- Minister responsible: Rechie Valdez, Minister of Women and Gender Equality
- Deputy Minister responsible: Frances McCrae
- Parent department: Full department status (2018–present); Canadian Heritage (1971–2018)
- Website: women-gender-equality.canada.ca

Women and Gender Equality Canada (WAGE; French: Femmes et Égalité des genres Canada (FEGC)), known as Status of Women Canada from 1976 to 2018, is a department of the Government of Canada. Previously an agency under the Department of Canadian Heritage, it gained department status after a vote in December 2018 passed the Budget Implementation Act, 2018, No. 2, which included legislation in favour of evolving the agency into a department and increasing its power, duties, and functions to those concerning not just women, but all gender identities. The purpose of the department is to "advance equality with respect to sex, sexual orientation, and gender identity or expression through the inclusion of people of all genders, including women, in Canada's economic, social, and political life" as well as the intersection of these with other identities such as ethnicity, age, socio-economic level, disability, and others. The department partners with other areas of government, both federal and provincial, as well as civil and private organizations in order to achieve this.

== History ==
A Minister responsible for the Status of Women was first appointed in 1971 by Prime Minister Pierre Trudeau, when the Royal Commission on the Status of Women recommended a representative for women be established in the federal government. There has been an office and a coordinator since 1970, initially established in the Privy Council Office, until it became a full departmental agency in 1976.

The Status of Women pioneered several initiatives since its conception, many of which are still in place today. Some significant initiatives include the Gender-based Analysis Plus (GBA+) program and It's Time: Canada's Strategy to Prevent and Address Gender-Based Violence. The agency also led the celebration in 2016 of the 100th Anniversary of Women's First Right to Vote in Canada. Status of Women Canada' has led events like Women's History Month, International Day of the Girl, and October 18, the day that Women were officially recognized as legal persons, appropriately called Persons Day.

During the premiership of Prime Minister Stephen Harper, the agency experienced a number of budget cuts totaling 5 million dollars, as well as significant restructuring including changes to which organizations were eligible to receive the agency's funding and instructions to close 12 of its 15 offices across Canada.

Feminism and issues related to equality became the center of attention in the 2015 Federal Election, with the Liberal party platform promising a focus on gender and women's issues, particular focus was given to the promise of a gender balanced cabinet. With feminism being a priority of the Liberal government, Status of Women Canada was provided with $41 million over six years to increase their capacity. As part of this, Statistics Canada will get $6.7 million over five years to create a new Centre for Gender, Diversity and Inclusion Statistics.

== Funding efforts ==
=== Announcement of funding ===
The Department of Women and Gender Equality provides funding for organizations that empower women's rights in Canada. The department provides funding through the Women's Program whose three priority areas lie "in ending violence against women and girls, improving women's and girls' economic security and prosperity, and encouraging women and girls in leadership and decision-making roles." Funding can be applied for through this program if an organization fits into helping or aiding one or more of the three priority areas.

It was in 2018 when the call for new applications for funding was announced, and the objective of this specific round of applications was to provide funding to those organizations that continually advance gender equality in Canada and around the world. More specifically, this funding was announced to aid these organizations in meeting the increased demand for their services due to the strong advancement of equality. Over the next five years 100 million dollars will be provided to many different organizations that empower women and girls all across Canada.

=== Organizations ===
One of the four organizations that was granted funding by the government was the Barbra Schlifer Commemorative Clinic. According to their website the Barbra Schlifer Clinic aims to assist as many women as possible throughout the year by providing counselling, legal advice, and representation. Moreover, their goal is to provide these services so women around them can live lives free from violence. Furthermore, the Government of Canada provided $1,000,000 to this organization so that they are able to maintain their services for those who are in need and the funding will be going to help the organization reach out to more women who are isolated or at risk. This organization was granted funding through the Women's Program.

Another one of the organizations that was given money through the Women's Program grants was the Canadian Council of Muslim Women. Their project titled "Strengthening Capacity to empower Muslim Women and Girls" will work to "provide equity, equality and empowerment for all Canadian Muslim women." The $761,720.00 provided by the Government of Canada will be used to increase the amount of money that the organization is able to put into resources they provide for Muslim women and girls. There are many challenges that Muslim women face in Canada today and ideally this funding will foster an atmosphere where change can occur.

The Department for Women and Gender Equality is also working to advance and advocate on behalf of women with disabilities by giving grants to and coordinating with the organization Disabled Women's Network (DAWN) Canada. DAWN Canada is a non-profit organization committed to advocating on behalf of women with disabilities and aims to eliminate the poverty, discrimination, and violence experienced by women with disabilities of all ages, races, genders, and sexual orientations through the use of research, education, and advocacy. The Department for Women and Gender Equality's DAWN Canada Grant 2019-2023 project will grant $830,959 to DAWN Canada to help the organization in its ability to network, coordinate with partners, research, educate and advocate for women with disabilities.

The Department for Women and Gender Equality's Strategically Advancing Gender Equality (SAGE) project aims to support low-income women and their children by funding and supporting the Scarborough Women's Centre. The Scarborough Women's Centre is a Toronto based non-profit organization, and community center, that provides supportive services and shelter to women suffering from issues related to poverty, unemployment, mental health, isolation, and abuse, regardless of their background. The Department for Women and Gender Equality will grant the Scarborough Women's Centre $209,240 to help deliver much-needed services, resources, support, and education to women in need to enable them to gain economic and emotional independence.

== See also ==
- Minister for Women and Gender Equality
- Gender-based Analysis – also known as GBA+
- Australia's Office of the Status of Women
