= Standing Rules of the United States Senate =

Parliamentary procedures

The Standing Rules of the Senate are the parliamentary procedures adopted by the United States Senate that govern its procedure. The Senate's power to establish rules derives from Article One, Section 5 of the United States Constitution: "Each House may determine the rules of its proceedings ..."

There are currently forty-four rules, with the latest revision adopted on January 24, 2013. The most recent addition of a new rule occurred in 2006, when The Legislative Transparency and Accountability Act of 2006 introduced a 44th rule on earmarks. The stricter rules are often waived by unanimous consent.

== Outline of rules ==
=== Quorum ===
The Constitution provides that a majority of the Senate constitutes a quorum to do business. Under the rules and customs of the Senate, a quorum is always assumed to be present unless a quorum call explicitly demonstrates otherwise. Any senator may request a quorum call by "suggesting the absence of a quorum"; a clerk then calls the roll of the Senate and notes which members are present. In practice, senators almost always request quorum calls not to establish the presence of a quorum, but to temporarily delay proceedings without having to adjourn the session. Such a delay may serve one of many purposes; often, it allows Senate leaders to negotiate compromises off the floor or to allow senators time to come to the Senate floor to make speeches without having to constantly be present in the chamber while waiting for the opportunity. Once the need for a delay has ended, any senator may request unanimous consent to rescind the quorum call.

=== Debate ===
The Senate is presided over by the Presiding Officer, either the President of the Senate (the Vice President) or more often the President pro tempore (in special cases the Chief Justice presides). During debates, senators may speak only if called upon by the Presiding Officer. The Presiding Officer is, however, required to recognize the first senator who rises to speak. Thus, the Presiding Officer has little control over the course of debate. Customarily, the majority leader and minority leader are accorded priority during debates, even if another senator rises first. All speeches must be addressed to the Presiding Officer, using the words "Mr. President" or "Madam President". Only the Presiding Officer may be directly addressed in speeches; other members must be referred to in the third person. In most cases, senators refer to each other not by name, but by state, using forms such as "the senior senator from Virginia" or "the junior senator from California".

There are very few restrictions on the content of speeches, and there is no requirement that speeches be germane to the matter before the Senate.

The Senate Rules provide that no senator may make more than two speeches on a motion or bill on the same legislative day (a legislative day begins when the Senate convenes and ends when it adjourns; hence, it does not necessarily coincide with the calendar day). The length of these speeches is not limited by the rules; thus, in most cases, senators may speak for as long as they please. Often, the Senate adopts unanimous consent agreements imposing time limits. In other cases (for example, for the budget process), limits are imposed by statute. In general, however, the right to unlimited debate is preserved.

==== Filibuster ====
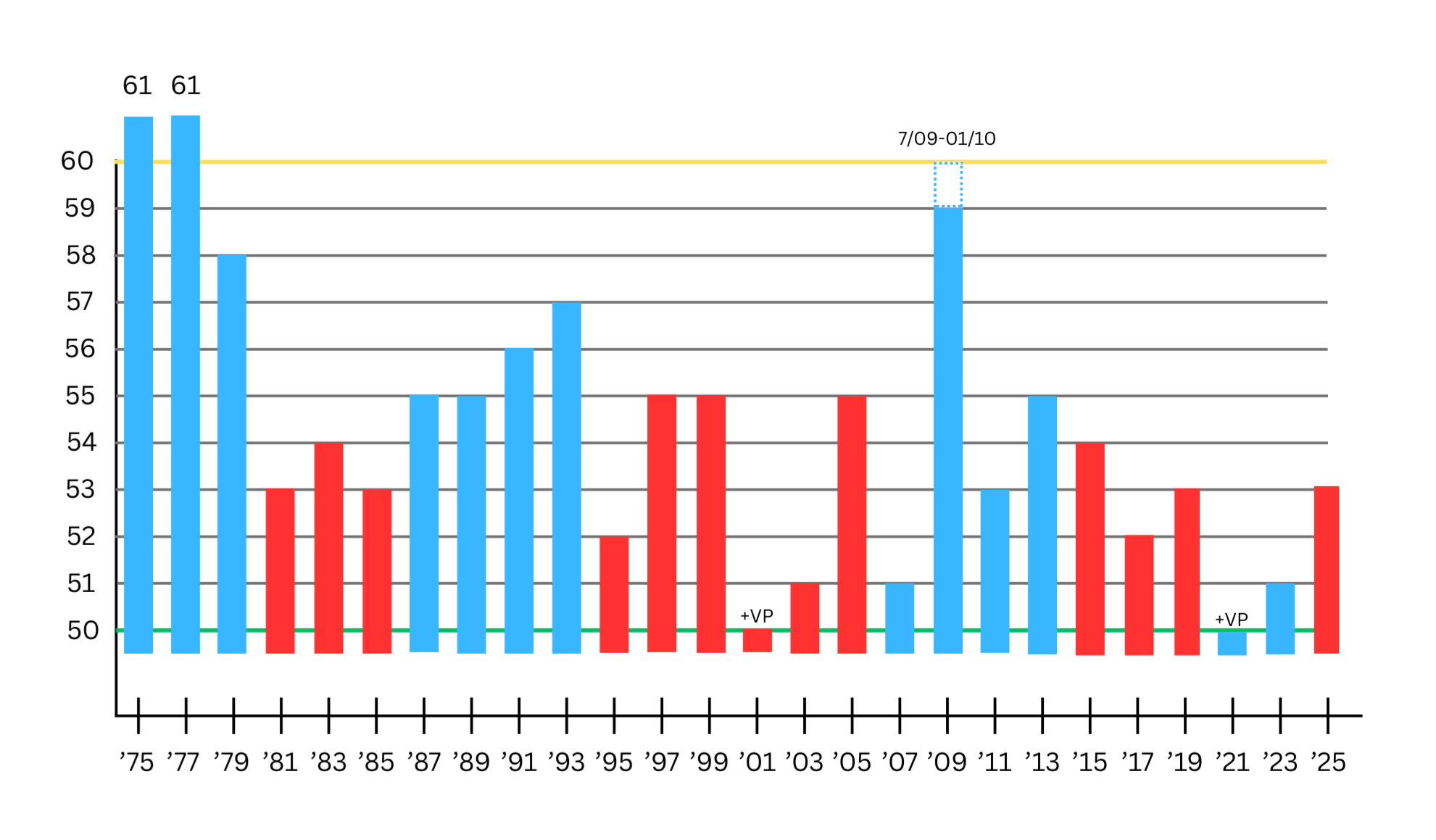
There have only been three filibuster-proof majorities since 1975, when cloture was reduced to 60 votes.

The filibuster is an obstructionary tactic used to defeat bills and motions by prolonging debate indefinitely. A filibuster may entail, but does not actually require, long speeches, dilatory motions, and an extensive series of proposed amendments. The second longest filibuster and the second-longest speech in the history of the Senate was delivered by Strom Thurmond, who spoke for over twenty-four hours in an unsuccessful attempt to block the passage of the Civil Rights Act of 1957. The Senate may end a filibuster by invoking cloture. In most cases, cloture requires the support of three-fifths of the Senate. Cloture is invoked very rarely, particularly because bipartisan support is usually necessary to obtain the required supermajority. If the Senate does invoke cloture, debate does not end immediately; instead, further debate is limited to thirty additional hours unless increased by another three-fifths vote.

The Senate Journal was often used as a means to filibuster legislation as the Senate rules state that "the reading of the Journal shall not be suspended unless by unanimous consent". When the Dyer Anti-Lynching Bill was discussed in 1922, the Mississippi Senator Pat Harrison started discussing the Senate Journal and was unable to be clotured until the sponsors withdrew the Bill.

==== Closed session ====
On occasion, the Senate may go into what is called a secret or closed session. During a closed session, the chamber doors are closed and the galleries are completely cleared of anyone not sworn to secrecy, not instructed in the rules of the closed session, or not essential to the session. Closed sessions are rare and are usually held only under certain circumstances in which the Senate is discussing sensitive subject matter, such as information critical to national security, private communications from the president, or discussions of Senate deliberations during impeachment trials. Any Senator has the right to call a closed session as long as the motion is seconded.

=== Voting ===
When debate concludes, the motion in question is put to a vote. In many cases, the Senate votes by voice vote; the presiding officer puts the question, and Members respond either "Aye!" (in favor of the motion) or "No!" (against the motion). The presiding officer then announces the result of the voice vote. Any senator, however, may challenge the presiding officer's assessment and request a recorded vote. The request may be granted only if it is seconded by one-fifth of the senators present. In practice, however, senators second requests for recorded votes as a matter of courtesy. When a recorded vote is held, the clerk calls the roll of the Senate in alphabetical order; each senator responds when their name is called. Senators who miss the roll call may still cast a vote as long as the recorded vote remains open. The vote is closed at the discretion of the presiding officer but must remain open for a minimum of fifteen minutes. If the vote is tied, the Vice President, if present, is entitled to a casting vote. If the Vice President is not present, however, the motion is resolved in the negative.

=== Committees ===
Tasks in the Senate are divided among sixteen standing committees, four select committees, four joint committees, and occasionally temporary committees. Senate rules establish the policy jurisdictions of each committee; for example, the Committee on Foreign Relations deals with all matters relating to foreign policy. Committees act, in effect, as "little legislatures", monitoring ongoing governmental operations, identifying issues suitable for legislative review, gathering and evaluating information, and recommending courses of action to their parent body in matters relating to their jurisdiction. Senate rules give committees significant gatekeeping authority over legislation that falls under their jurisdiction, with proposed bills submitted to the relevant committee, which can hold hearings, "mark up" bills, consolidate bills into a "clean bill", or ignore the bill altogether (there exist some workarounds for Senators to circumvent committees, but in general Senators work through the committee system).

The size of each standing committee is established by Senate rules. The makeup of committees are established through inter-party negotiations before each new Congress, with the percentage of a party's representation within the Senate determining the percentage of seats it will have on each committee.

=== Reconciliation ===
Legislation affecting spending, revenues, and the federal debt limit is governed under a special rules process called "Reconciliation" that prohibits filibusters by limiting debate to twenty hours. Congress can pass up to three reconciliation bills per year, with each bill addressing one of the topics of reconciliation (revenue, spending, or the debt limit). However, if Congress passes a reconciliation bill affecting more than one of those topics, it cannot pass another reconciliation bill later in the year affecting one of the topics addressed by the previous reconciliation bill. In practice, reconciliation bills have usually been passed once per year at most. Reconciliation cannot be used to enact or rescind discretionary spending (which is controlled through the annual appropriations process) or adjust Social Security spending, and is limited by the Byrd Rule, which allows senators to block provisions that are "extraneous" to spending, revenues, or the debt limit.

Reconciliation was created by the Congressional Budget Act of 1974, and significantly altered with the introduction of the Byrd Rule in 1985 (amended in 1990). Originally infrequently used (it did not see first use until 1980).

=== Nominations ===
Selected public positions in the United States are appointed by the president but require Senate approval. Senate rule XXXI governs the Senate process for considering the president's nominations.

For most positions, the nomination is passed first to a Senate committee for review. Generally, it is the Senate committee with jurisdiction over the topic or department related to the position to be filled.

A public hearing by the committee is possible. Historically, about half of civilian appointees were approved without a hearing. After consideration, the committee can report a favorable recommendation, an unfavorable recommendation, or report no recommendation. It can also fail to act. To simplify the process, with the support of the committee, the Senate by unanimous consent can discharge a nomination from the committee without the committee having acted.

It is then up to the leadership of the Senate to place the nomination on the Senate calendar for a vote in executive session. Some nominations are passed by unanimous consent. The leadership may delay putting a nomination on the calendar, and it may not then be acted upon.

==== Time limit ====
Paragraph 6 of rule XXXI specifies that if final action has not been taken before Congress adjourns, the nomination is returned to the President. By the same rule, nominations are returned when the Senate goes into recess for more than 30 days. However, in modern practice, some nominations may stay active over long recesses if the Senate holds pro forma sessions during recess or agrees to suspend the rule by unanimous consent. When a nomination is returned without action, the president may nominate a different person or re-nominate the same person.

== Rules by number ==
There are currently forty-four Standing Rules of the Senate:

1. SR Rule I: Appointment of a Senator to the Chair
2. SR Rule II: Presentation of Credentials and Questions of Privilege
3. SR Rule III: Oaths
4. SR Rule IV: Commencement of Daily Sessions
5. SR Rule V: Suspension and Amendment of the Rules
6. SR Rule VI: Quorum – Absent Senators May Be Sent For
7. SR Rule VII: Morning Business
8. SR Rule VIII: Order of Business
9. SR Rule IX: Messages
10. SR Rule X: Special Orders
11. SR Rule XI: Papers – Withdrawal, Printing, Reading of, and Reference
12. SR Rule XII: Voting Procedure
13. SR Rule XIII: Reconsideration
14. SR Rule XIV: Joint Resolutions, and Preambles Thereto
15. SR Rule XV: Amendments and Resolutions
16. SR Rule XVI: Appropriations and Amendments to General Appropriation Bills
17. SR Rule XVII: Reference to Committees; Motions to Discharge; Reports of Committees; and Hearings Available
18. SR Rule XVIII: Business Continued from Session to Session
19. SR Rule XIX: Debate
20. SR Rule XX: Questions for Order
21. SR Rule XXI: Session with Closed Doors
22. SR Rule XXII: Precedence of Motions
23. SR Rule XXIII: Privilege of the Floor
24. SR Rule XXIV: Appointments of Committee
25. SR Rule XXV: Standing Committees
26. SR Rule XXVI: Committee Procedure
27. SR Rule XXVII: Committee Staff
28. SR Rule XXVIII: Conference Committees; Reports; Open Meetings
29. SR Rule XXIX: Executive Sessions
30. SR Rule XXX: Executive Session – Proceedings on Treaties
31. SR Rule XXXI: Executive Session – Proceedings on Nominations
32. SR Rule XXXII: The President Furnished with Copies of Record Executive Sessions
33. SR Rule XXXIII: Senate Chamber – Senate Wing of the Capitol
34. SR Rule XXXIV: Public Financial Disclosure
35. SR Rule XXXV: Gifts
36. SR Rule XXXVI: Outside Earned Income
37. SR Rule XXXVII: Conflict of Interest
38. SR Rule XXXVIII: Prohibition of Unofficial Office Accounts
39. SR Rule XXXIX: Foreign Travel
40. SR Rule XL: Franking Privilege and Radio and Television Studios
41. SR Rule XLI: Political Fund Activity; Definitions
42. SR Rule XLII: Employment Practices
43. SR Rule XLIII: Representation by Members
44. SR Rule XLIV: Congressionally Directed Spending and Related Items

The latest change was the introduction in 2006 of a 44th rule on earmarks, by the Legislative Transparency and Accountability Act.
