= AWHF =

AWHF may refer to:

- Alaska Women's Hall of Fame
- Australian Women's History Forum
