= Minister for Women and Gender Equality =

Canadian cabinet position

- Ministre des Femmes et de l’Égalité des genres
- Incumbent; Rechie Valdez since May 13, 2025
- Department for Women and Gender Equality
- Style: The Honourable
- Member of: Cabinet; Privy Council
- Reports to: Prime Minister of Canada
- Appointer: Monarch (represented by the governor general); on the advice of the prime minister
- Term length: At His Majesty's pleasure
- Inaugural holder: Bob Andras
- Formation: June 11, 1971 (as Minister of Status of Women)
- Salary: CA$299,900 (2024)

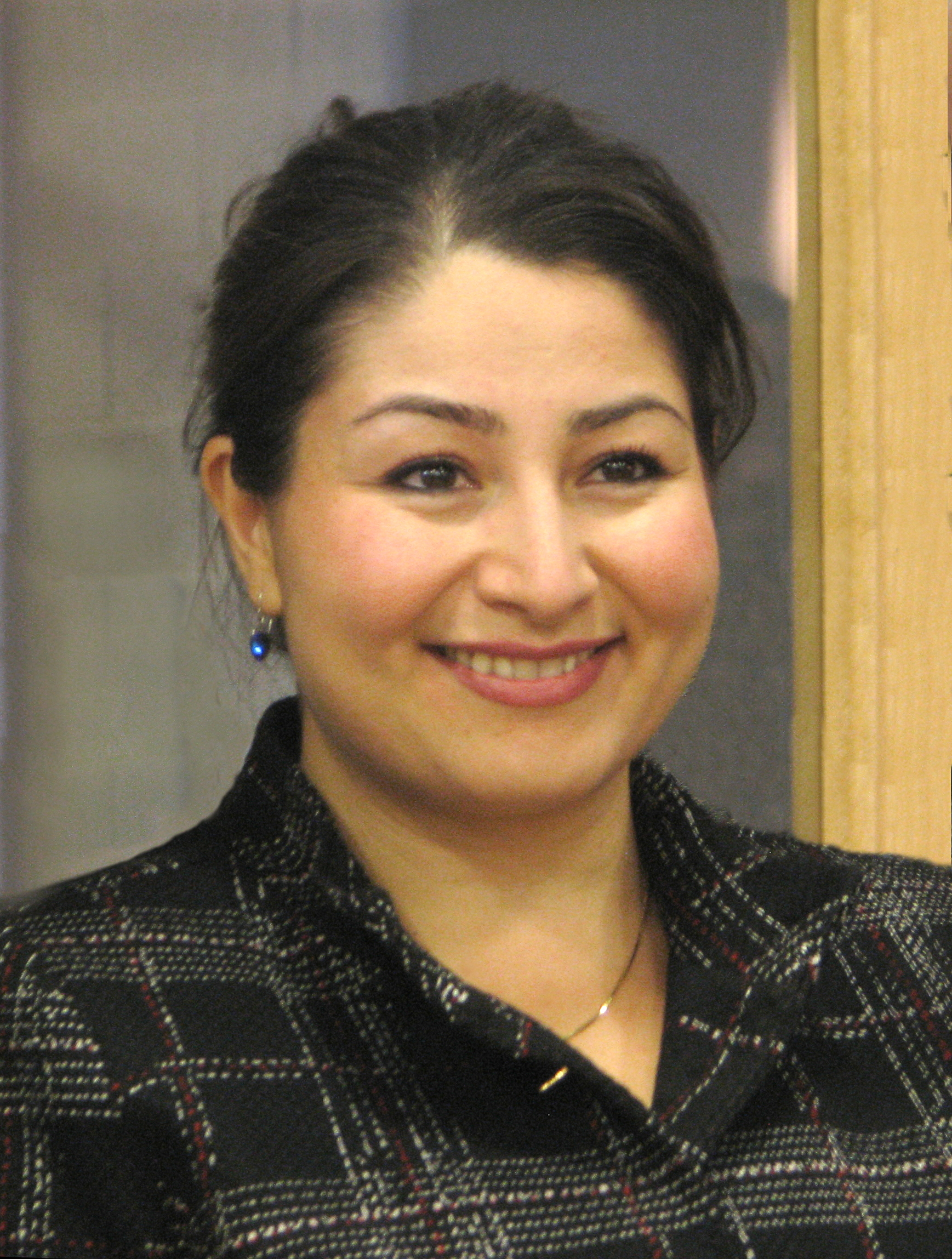
Maryam Monsef, 2016

The minister for women and gender equality (French: ministre des femmes et de l’égalité des genres) is the minister of the Crown responsible for the Department for Women and Gender Equality. The minister is a member of the King's Privy Council for Canada and the Canadian Cabinet.

Rechie Valdez has been minister for women and gender equality since May 13, 2025. The minister is selected by the prime minister and appointed by the Crown. The position was created in 2018, when Women and Gender Equality Canada became a standalone department. The precursor to the role was the minister of status of women, which was at various times was held by a secretary of state or minister of state.

== History ==
The position previously existed as Minister of Status of Women, responsible for what was then known as Status of Women Canada. Traditionally, the office that held the Status of Women portfolio under their purview, that minister has been designated the additional honorary title of Minister responsible for the Status of Women.

The Status of Women portfolio was originally created in 1971 as a product of the Royal Commission on the Status of Women (created in 1967), who completed their report in 1970. The title of Minister for Women and Gender Equality was created in 2018, following the passage of the Budget Implementation Act, 2018, No. 2 and the creation of the Department for Women and Gender Equality, separating Status of Women Canada from the Department of Canadian Heritage. Responsibility for youth issues was added to the portfolio in 2021, once again associating the office with the Department of Canadian Heritage. In 2025, Youth issues were reassgined to the Secretary of State (Children and Youth).

== Ministers ==
Name	Term of office		Additional role	Political party
Minister of Status of Women
Bob Andras	11 June 1971	7 August 1974		Lib
Marc Lalonde	1976 April 1	1977 September 15	Minister of Justice and Attorney General of Canada	Lib
Marc Lalonde	1977 September 16	1978 November 23	Minister of State (Federal-Provincial Relations)	Lib
Marc Lalonde	1978 November 24	1979 June 3	Minister of National Health and Welfare and Minister responsible for Fitness and Amateur Sport	Lib
David Samuel Horne MacDonald	1979 June 3	1980 March 2	Secretary of State and Minister of Communications	PC
Lloyd Axworthy	1980 March 3	1981 September 21	Minister of Employment and Immigration	Lib
Judith Erola	1981 September 22	1983 August 11	Minister of Consumer and Corporate Affairs	Lib
Judith Erola	1983 August 12	1984 September 16	Minister of State (Mines)	Lib
Walter Franklin McLean	1984 September 17	1985 August 19	Secretary of State	PC
Walter Franklin McLean	1985 August 20	1986 June 29		PC
Barbara Jean McDougall	1986 June 30	1990 February 22		PC
Mary Collins	1990 February 23	1993 January 3	Associate Minister of National Defence	PC
Mary Collins	1993 January 4	1993 June 24	Minister of Western Economic Diversification and Minister of State (Environment)	PC
Mary Collins	1993 June 25	1993 November 3	Minister of National Health and Welfare	PC
Jean Augustine	2003 December 12	2004 July 19	Minister of State	Lib
Liza Frulla	2004 July 20	2006 February 5	Minister of Canadian Heritage	Lib
Bev Oda as Minister of Canadian Heritage and Status of Women	2006 February 6	2007 August 13		Cons
Josée Verner as Minister of Canadian Heritage, Status of Women and Official Languages	2007 August 14	2008 October 29		Cons
Josée Verner as Minister of Canadian Heritage, Status of Women and Official Languages	2008 May 27	2008 October 29	Minister of State	Cons
Helena Guergis as Minister of State (Status of Women)	2008 October 30	2010 April 8		Cons
Rona Ambrose	2010 April 9	2013 July 14	Minister of Public Works and Government Services	Cons
Kellie Leitch	2013 July 15	2013 December 11	Minister of Labour	Cons
Kellie Leitch	2013 December 12	2015 November 3	Minister of Labour	Cons
Patty Hajdu	2015 November 4	2017 January 9		Lib
Maryam Monsef	2017 January 10	2018 December 12		Lib
Minister for Women and Gender Equality
Maryam Monsef	2018 December 13	2019 November 20	Minister of International Development	Lib
Maryam Monsef	2019 November 20	2021 October 26	Minister of Rural Economic Development	Lib
Minister for Women and Gender Equality and Youth
Marci Ien	2021 October 26	2025 March 14		Lib
Minister of Women and Gender Equality
Rechie Valdez	2025 May 15	Present	Secretary of State (Small Business and Tourism)	Lib

The "status of women" portfolio was originally created in 1971 as result of the Royal Commission on the Status of Women (created in 1967), who completed their report in 1970. This new position, originally titled the Office of the Co-ordinator, Status of Women, was initially meant to help implement the recommendations of the Royal Commission.

During the 1993–2003 ministry of Jean Chrétien, the position was titled Secretary of State (Status of Women), as it did not carry full cabinet rank. The first cabinet of Paul Martin also kept this title, as the office's responsibilities were delegated from the Minister of Canadian Heritage. However, in July 2004, the title reverted to Minister responsible for the Status of Women with the swearing-in of Liza Frulla, who doubled as Heritage Minister and was thus ultimately responsible for Status of Women Canada.

In 2016, the position was made a member of the Queen's Privy Council for Canada. In 2018, following the passage of the Budget Implementation Act, 2018, No. 2, Status of Women Canada became a federal department called the Women and Gender Equality Canada (WAGE). WAGE administers the Governor General's Awards in Commemoration of the Persons Case. One of the programs started by the Status of Women Canada was an education/analysis program called gender-based Analysis Plus (GBA+).

In March 2025, Mark Carney eliminated the position, but later restored it following the 2025 Canadian federal election using the new name, Minister of Women and Gender Equality.
