= Morning business =

United States Senate procedure

In the United States Senate, morning business refers to a designated period during a legislative day when routine proceedings are conducted. Despite its name, morning business can occur at any time during the day, typically by unanimous consent.

== Activities ==
Activities conducted during morning business include:

- Receiving messages: Formal communications from the President and the House of Representatives are presented.
- Introduction of legislation: Senators introduce bills and joint resolutions, which are then referred to appropriate committees for consideration.
- Submission of resolutions: Senators submit various resolutions addressing legislative or procedural matters
- Committee reports: Committees present findings and recommendations on legislation or issues they have examined.
- Petitions and memorials: Citizens’ petitions and memorials are formally presented to the Senate.

During this time, senators may also speak on topics of personal or constituent interest. The Senate's rules stipulate that morning business should occur after the reading of the Journal and before the consideration of other legislative matters. However, the exact timing and duration can vary based on unanimous consent agreements among senators.
