= Gender-based Analysis Plus =

Gender-based Analysis Plus (GBA Plus) is an analytical process created by the Status of Women Canada to analyze the "gendered" aspects of Canadian government policy to assess the different experiences of women, men and non-binary people to policies, programs and initiatives. The 'Plus' considers the intersectionality of many other identity factors (like race, ethnicity, religion, age, education, sexual orientation, culture, income, language, and mental or physical disability) which comprise Canada's demographics, and how the relationships between these identity factors impact the manner through which its residents experience government programs and initiatives. Rather than a form of advocacy, GBA Plus goes through a number of analytical steps that should be at the forefront of policymakers' minds, instead of an add-on, to help them ask questions and challenge assumptions, which will thereby result in policy that accounts for the diversity of Canada. Women and Gender Equality Canada is responsible for the government-wide implementation of GBA Plus, but all Canadian departments and agencies have a commitment to the process.

== History ==
In 2005, the Standing Committee on the Status of Women released a report detailing how Gender-Based Analysis (GBA) was implemented in federal government agencies, and considered accountability measures for the program. The report clarified that the implementation of GBA needed to be across the federal government and remained a shared commitment between Status of Women Canada and federal agencies. The report also stated the potential for GBA to influence policy making in areas not commonly referred to as "women's issues", such as the federal budget, trade, or defence.

In 2011, Status of Women Canada renamed GBA as Gender-based Analysis Plus (GBA+). The new name highlighted a shift to focusing from solely gender to other diverse identity factors that impact Canadians.

In November 2015 , Prime Minister Justin Trudeau appointed the first Minister of Status of Women to Cabinet, continuing the Government's commitment to gender and diversity considerations in decision-making.

GBA+ can be used to assess the impact on citizens such as addressing how procurement projects can help to ensure that equipment and products meet diverse needs. It can also be used to review hiring strategies to see that they are implemented to ensure workplace diversity.

An internal survey of Government of Canada departments found that "fewer than half of departments and agencies have a GBA+ plan, with most departments saying they lack the internal mechanisms to apply one." Canada's GBA initiative was started following commitments by the Government of Canada at the World Conference on Women, 1995 in Beijing. During the 2018 G20 Buenos Aires summit in Argentina Prime Minister Justin Trudeau said, "Well, you know, there are gender impacts when you bring construction workers into a rural area. There are social impacts because they're mostly male construction workers. How are you adjusting and adapting to those? That's what the gender lens in GBA (gender-based analysis)-plus budgeting is all about."

The Department of National Defence is using GBA+ to be ensure that they are removing bias from procurement of a range of products from uniforms to Aircraft. The Royal Canadian Mounted Police leveraged GBA+ to develop tools to for greater cultural competency and better response to gender-based violence (GBV) when training their staff. Minister Carla Qualtrough has said that "in all of our procurements, military and otherwise, we are looking at ways to ensure opportunities for businesses owned or led by Canadians from under-represented groups, such as women, Indigenous peoples, and persons with disabilities" and the GBA+ framework is an important to achieve this.

== Controversy ==
A report from the Office of the Auditor General of Canada (OAG) claimed that GBA+ was not being utilized in most federal agencies because it was not a mandated requirement. It also posited that when GBA+ was utilized, it was not done thoroughly within agencies, or consistently between agencies. The OAG recommended mandating the use of GBA+, which Prime Minister Justin Trudeau has done, stating to each of his cabinet members on January 15, 2021:

You will apply Gender-based Analysis Plus (GBA+) in the decisions that you make and consider public policies through an intersectional lens in order to address systemic inequities including: systemic racism; unconscious bias; gender-based discrimination; barriers for persons with disabilities; discrimination against LGBTQ2 communities; and inequities faced by all vulnerable populations. Whenever possible, you will work to improve the quality and availability of disaggregated data to ensure that policy decisions benefit all communities.

According to a study done by Olena Hankivsky and Linda Mussell, the + in GBA+ is interpreted in various ways by federal policy analysts who have taken the training. These academics argue that intersectionality cannot be properly considered using the GBA+ model; however, they claim that GBA+ is a positive step toward social justice and diversity in Canada.

Due to its tertiary nature, GBA+ has been criticized in the media for having little effect on bad policy. Stephanie Paterson agrees, arguing that the problem of diversity lies within the creative process of the policy. In other words, if the policy does not address inequality to begin with, GBA+ has little impact except to soften the blow. From a feminist standpoint, it has necessarily created an avenue for analysts to make important steps toward diversity within the federal government's policy decisions. Since the GBA+ itself is misunderstood commonly among federal analysts, Femocrats have developed intelligent ways to explain the GBA+ benefits. However, this brings to light another issue: GBA+ adding unnecessary "red tape" to already bogged-down municipal agencies for the purpose of a federal political agenda.
