= Nevertheless, she persisted =

Feminist expression

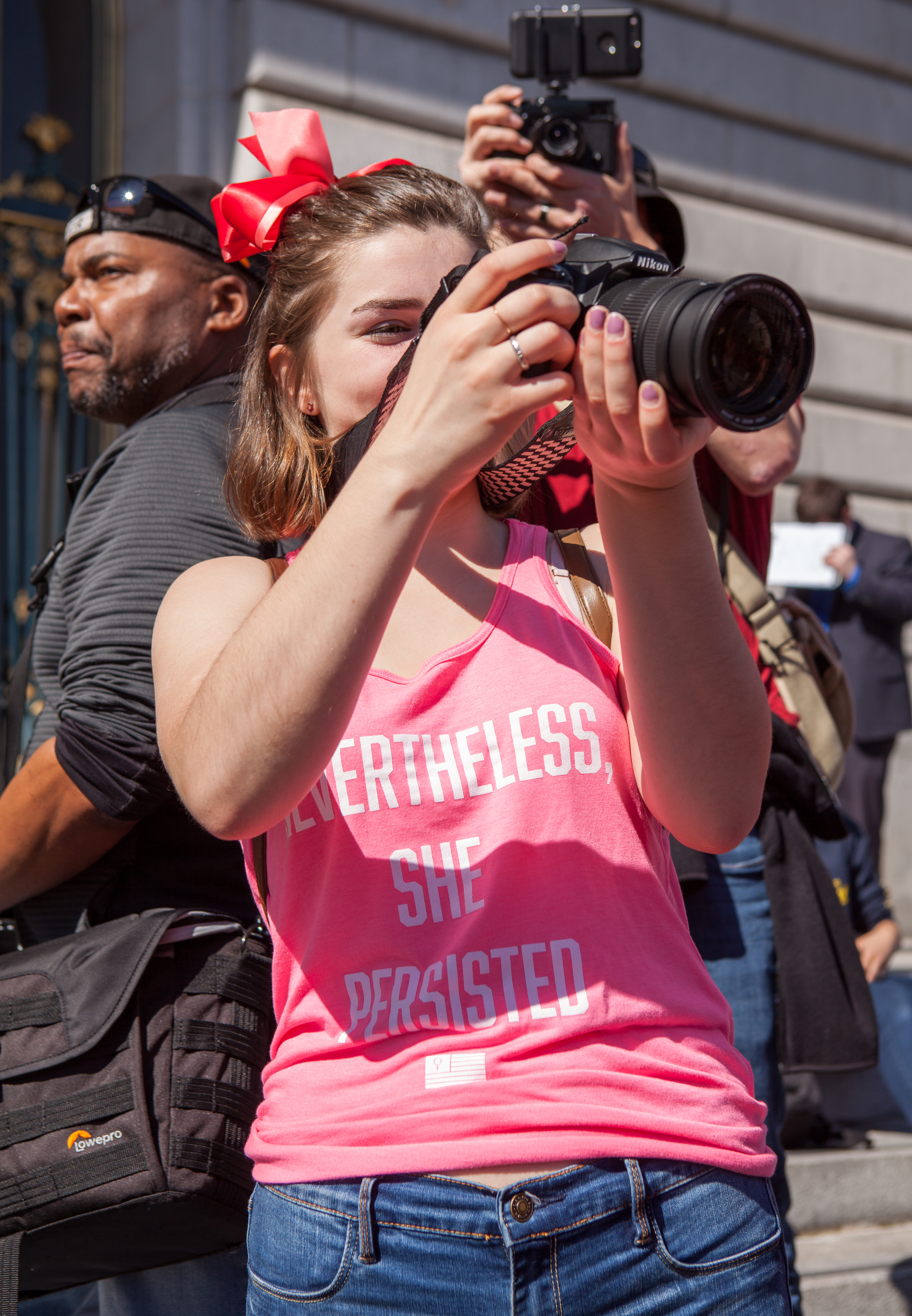
A photographer at an International Women's Day event wearing a "Nevertheless, she persisted" top

"Nevertheless, she persisted" is an expression adopted by the feminist movement, especially in the United States. It became popular in 2017 after the United States Senate voted to require Senator Elizabeth Warren to stop speaking during the confirmation of Senator Jeff Sessions as U.S. Attorney General. Senate Majority Leader Mitch McConnell made this remark during his comments following the vote.

The expression went viral as feminists posted it on social media with hashtag references to other women. Its meaning has expanded to refer more broadly to women's persistence in breaking barriers, despite being silenced or ignored.

== Background ==
=== Senate debate on confirmation of Jeff Sessions ===
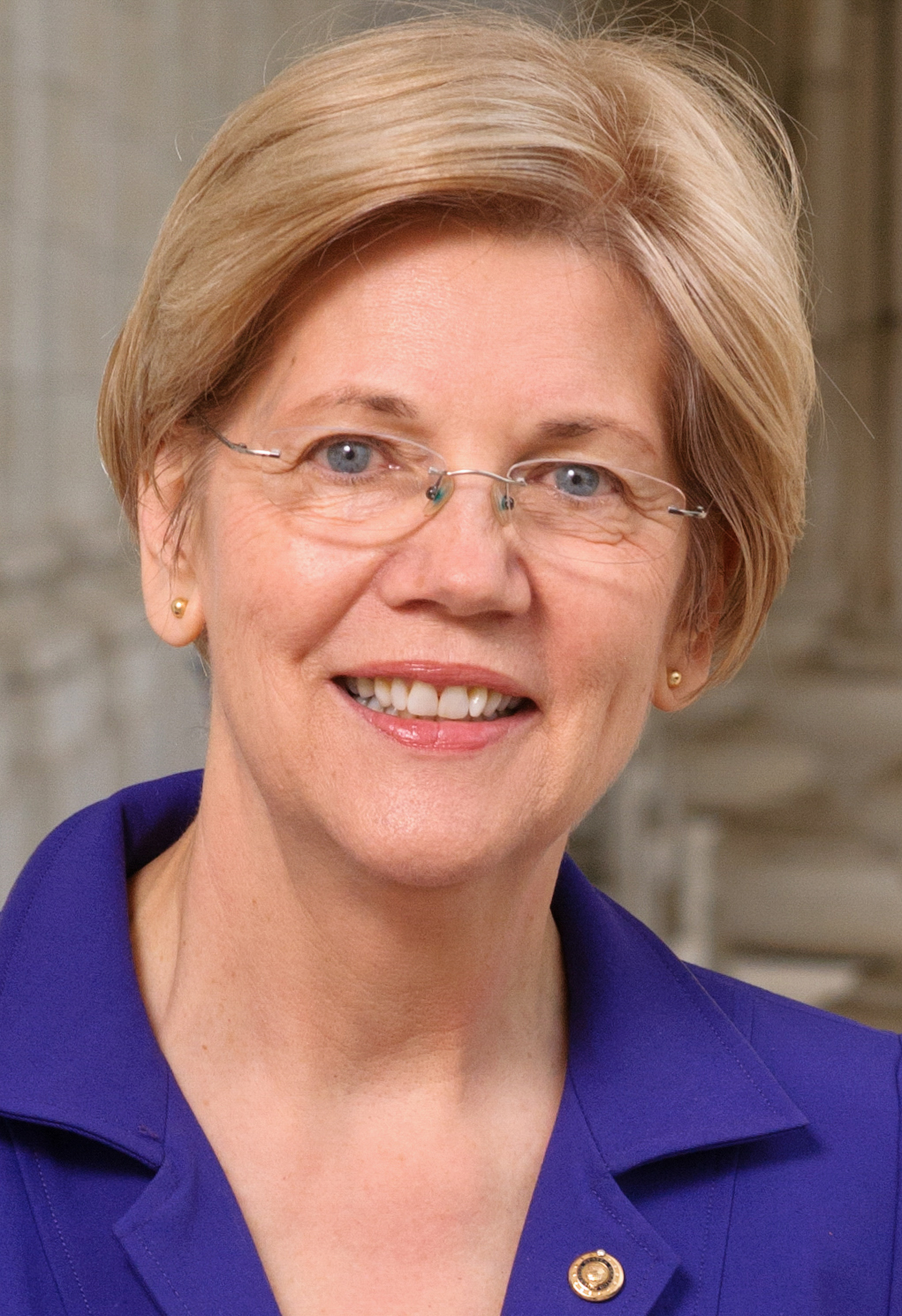
Elizabeth Warren

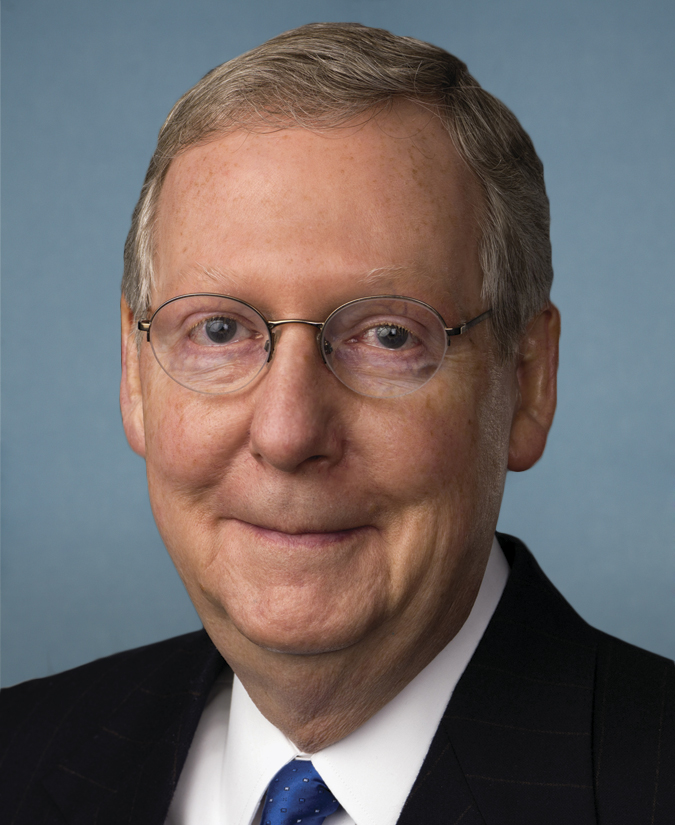
Mitch McConnell

On February 7, 2017, the U.S. Senate debated confirmation of Senator Jeff Sessions of Alabama to become Attorney General. Senator Elizabeth Warren of Massachusetts spoke against confirmation, criticizing his record on civil rights.

Senator Warren quoted a statement from 1986 by former Senator Ted Kennedy regarding Senator Sessions's nomination to federal court judge, "He is, I believe, a disgrace to the Justice Department, and he should withdraw his nomination and resign his position." Senator Warren said she "will stand with Senator Kennedy, and, like he did, I will cast my vote against the nomination of Senator Sessions."

Senator Warren continued by reading a letter that Coretta Scott King had written to the Senate Judiciary Committee in 1986:

Civil rights leaders, including my husband and Albert Turner, have fought long and hard to achieve free and unfettered access to the ballot box. Mr. SESSIONS has used the awesome power of his office to chill the free exercise of the vote by black citizens in the district he now seeks to serve as a federal judge. This simply cannot be allowed to happen. Mr. SESSIONS' conduct as U.S. Attorney, from his politically-motivated voting fraud prosecutions to his indifference toward criminal violations of civil rights laws, indicates that he lacks the temperament, fairness and judgment to be a federal judge.

=== Senate Rule XIX ===
Senator Daines cuts off Senator Warren's speech on Attorney General nominee Jeff Sessions (video).

While Senator Warren was reading the letter from Mrs. King, Presiding Senate Chair Steve Daines of Montana interrupted her, reminding her of Senate Rule XIX, which prohibits ascribing "to another senator or to other senators any conduct or motive unworthy or unbecoming a senator".

Senator Warren stated that she had said that only former Senator Kennedy had called Senator Sessions a disgrace, and she asked whether reading King's letter, which had been admitted into the Senate Record in 1986, was a violation of Senate Rules. Senator Daines again quoted Rule XIX. Senator Warren asked to continue reading Mrs. King's letter, and Senator Daines allowed her to do so.

=== McConnell's objection ===
Sen. McConnell refuses to let Sen. Warren speak about Attorney General nominee Sessions (video).

While Senator Warren continued reading the letter, Senate Majority Leader Mitch McConnell of Kentucky interrupted, saying, "The senator has impugned the motives and conduct of our colleague from Alabama, as warned by the chair." Senator McConnell objected to a line from Ms. King's letter, "Mr. Sessions has used the awesome power of his office to chill the free exercise of the vote by black citizens", which Senator Warren had quoted prior to the warning.

Senator Warren said she was "surprised that the words of Coretta Scott King are not suitable for debate in the United States Senate" and requested to continue. Senator Daines asked whether there was objection. Senator McConnell objected, and Senator Daines called for a vote, saying, "The senator will take her seat", preventing Senator Warren from continuing. The Senate voted to sustain McConnell's objection along party lines, 49–43, silencing Warren for the duration of the Sessions confirmation hearings.

Thirty hours remained in the hearings, and Democrats objected to Senator Warren's silencing. Senator Jeff Merkley of Oregon subsequently read the letter from Coretta Scott King without objection. Senator Cory Booker of New Jersey pointed out that the letter was already in the 1986 Congressional Record.

=== After the vote ===
"Nevertheless, she persisted", by Mitch McConnell, about Elizabeth Warren (video)

Following the Senate ruling to silence Senator Warren, Senator McConnell said on the Senate floor:

Senator Warren was giving a lengthy speech. She had appeared to violate the rule. She was warned. She was given an explanation. Nevertheless, she persisted.

== Reactions ==
=== Rallying cry ===
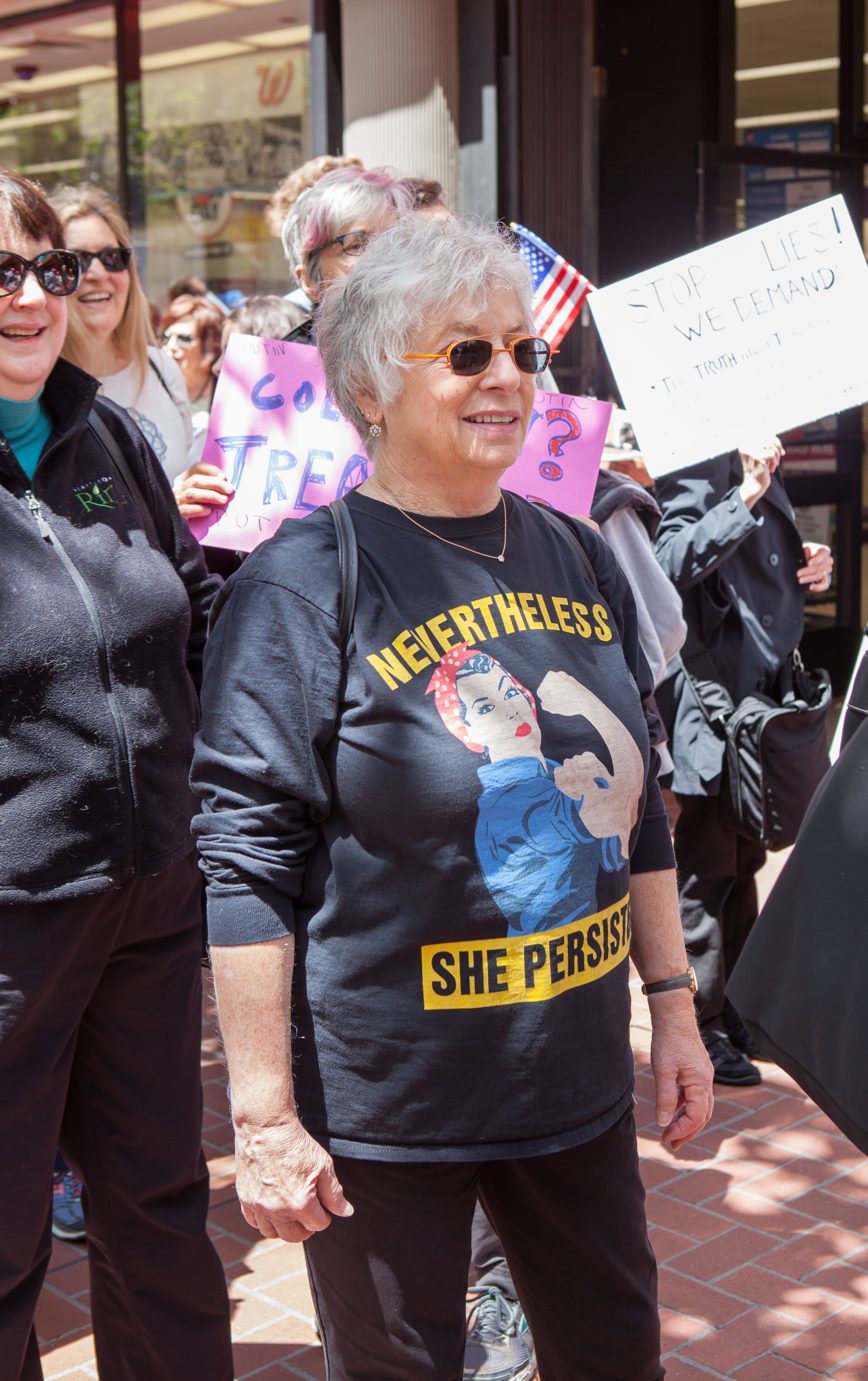
"Nevertheless she persisted" on a Rosie the Riveter T-shirt at San Francisco March for Truth

Feminists and supporters of Senator Warren immediately adopted as a rallying cry the three-word sentence, "Nevertheless, she persisted." It has been referenced with hashtags such as "#Shepersisted", and "#LetLizspeak", and it has been called a "hashtag-ready motto for women at the ready to break barriers". According to BuzzFeed, the quotation was shared on social media along with pictures of strong women "who refused to be silenced". Amy Wang of The Washington Post observed,

If the Republican senators had intended to minimize Warren's message, the decision backfired—severely. Her supporters immediately seized upon McConnell's line—giving Warren a far bigger megaphone than if they had simply let her continue speaking in what had been a mostly empty chamber, some pointed out.

— Amy Wang, The Washington Post

CNN reported, "For Warren's supporters, it was a textbook case of mansplaining followed by males silencing a woman".

On National Public Radio's All Things Considered, Scott Detrow said that "Nevertheless, she persisted" had become the new "nasty woman", which had become a rallying cry derived from Donald Trump's description of Hillary Clinton in 2016.

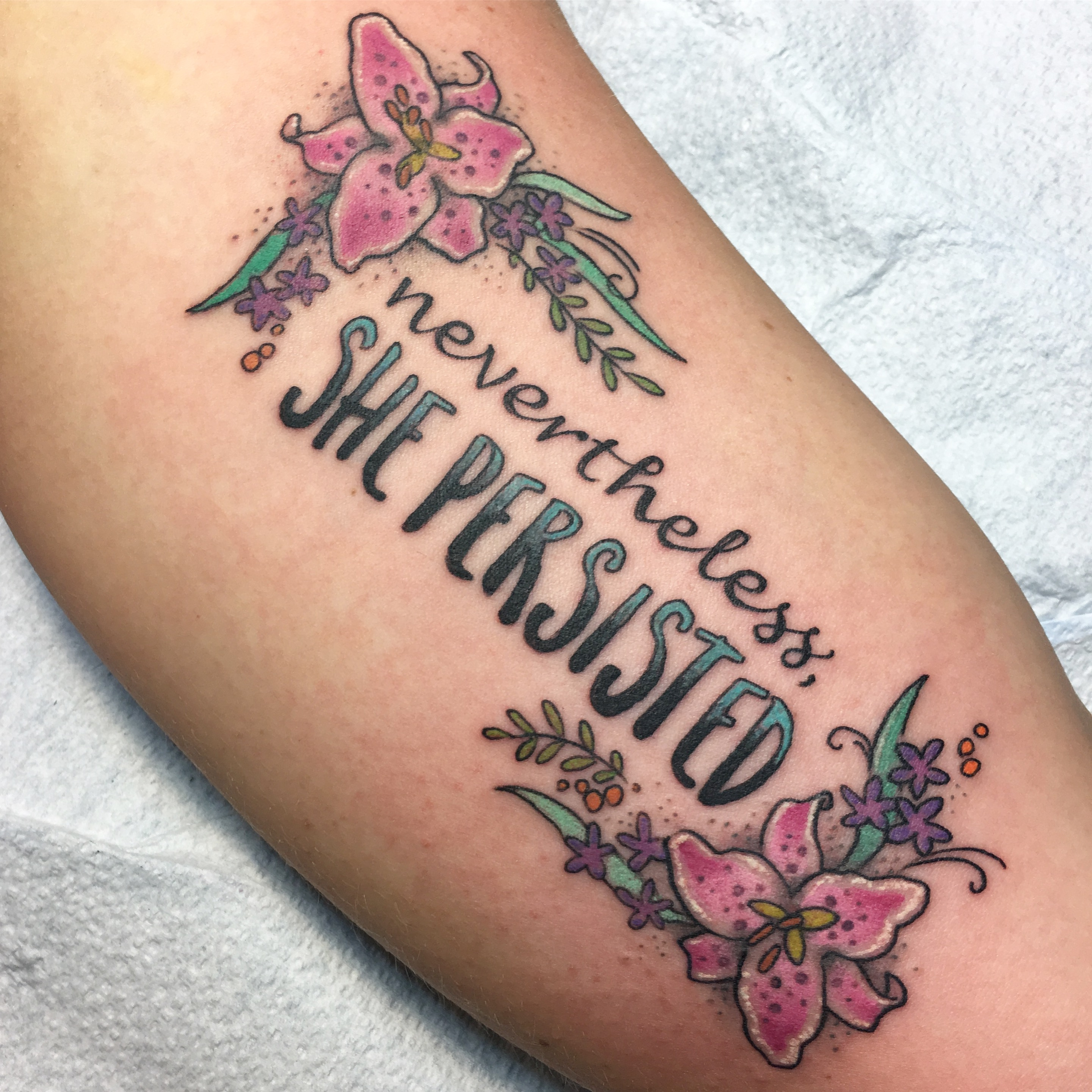
Tattoo

Megan Garber of The Atlantic wrote that "Nevertheless, she persisted" appeared on the internet next to "images not just of Warren and King, but also of Harriet Tubman, Malala Yousafzai, Beyoncé, Emmeline Pankhurst, Gabby Giffords, Michelle Obama, Hillary Clinton, and Princess Leia. It accompanied tags that celebrated #TheResistance". Hillary Clinton tweeted, "She was warned. She was given an explanation. Nevertheless, she persisted. So must we all." It also appeared on merchandise: Reebok produced tee shirts with the expression and gave the proceeds to the Women's March. Hoodies and mugs with the meme were also produced. Salon reported women getting tattoos of the three words, more than 100 women in Minneapolis alone.

On June 7, 2017, Senator Warren tweeted support for Senator Kamala Harris using the "Nevertheless She Persisted" hashtag, after Harris was admonished for interrupting Deputy Attorney General Rod Rosenstein during a hearing.

In 2018, the Women's History Month theme in the United States was "Nevertheless, She Persisted: Honoring Women Who Fight All Forms of Discrimination against Women", intentionally referring to the "Nevertheless, she persisted" remark by Mitch McConnell.

=== Criticism ===
Others were less favorably inclined toward the expression and its application to Warren. Charlotte Allen of The Weekly Standard suggested that #Shepersisted was yet another tactic in the marketing of Warren as a possible presidential candidate, describing it as "Red meat for Warren's supporters, who promptly cried sexism and compared her to Rosa Parks in her refusal to move to the back of the bus, and also to Marie Curie, who never gave up on her quest to discover radium. Within hours entrepreneurs were grinding out 'Nevertheless, she persisted' T-shirts in every size and color".

The incident was also discussed in the context of Senator Warren's possible presidential candidacy by the National Review's David Harsanyi, who referred to Rule XIX as "an arbitrary, speech-inhibiting rule that should not be used". Stating that "it was unlikely any persuadable voter would have even heard about Warren's grandstanding if it weren't for the kerfuffle", he suggested that the "fuss" (including popularity of the hashtags "#ShePersisted" and "#LetLizspeak") was indicative of a Democratic tendency to "rely heavily on the identity politics that have failed them for six years, if not longer".

Also in the National Review, Alexandra Desanctis wrote that McConnell's remark was "inviting endless inappropriate comparisons between Warren and female political activists from around the world". Desanctis continued:

Tubman and Truth were enslaved and beaten, Anthony and Stanton were denied the right to vote, Parks was thrown in jail, and Yousafzai was shot in the brain. Warren stood in the U.S. Senate insisting that Sessions's "racism, sexism, and bigotry" are dangerous to American freedoms, a claim that is dubious at best. The idea that she has done anything even remotely comparable to these women is ludicrous at best. And at worst, it trivializes the courage of those in whose company it places Warren and makes a mockery of their contribution to democracy.

Gretel Kaufman of The Christian Science Monitor noted that some Democrats used the hashtag #LetLizSpeak to call Senator McConnell's remarks sexist and that the video of Senator Warren reading the full letter was widely viewed on social media. Raising concerns that the incident was "an example of partisanship getting in the way of productive debate", Kaufman quoted Republican Senator Orrin Hatch of Utah, as saying, "All of us need to take stock and need to start thinking about the people on the other side of the aisle and need to start thinking about how we might bring each other together."

=== Broader themes ===
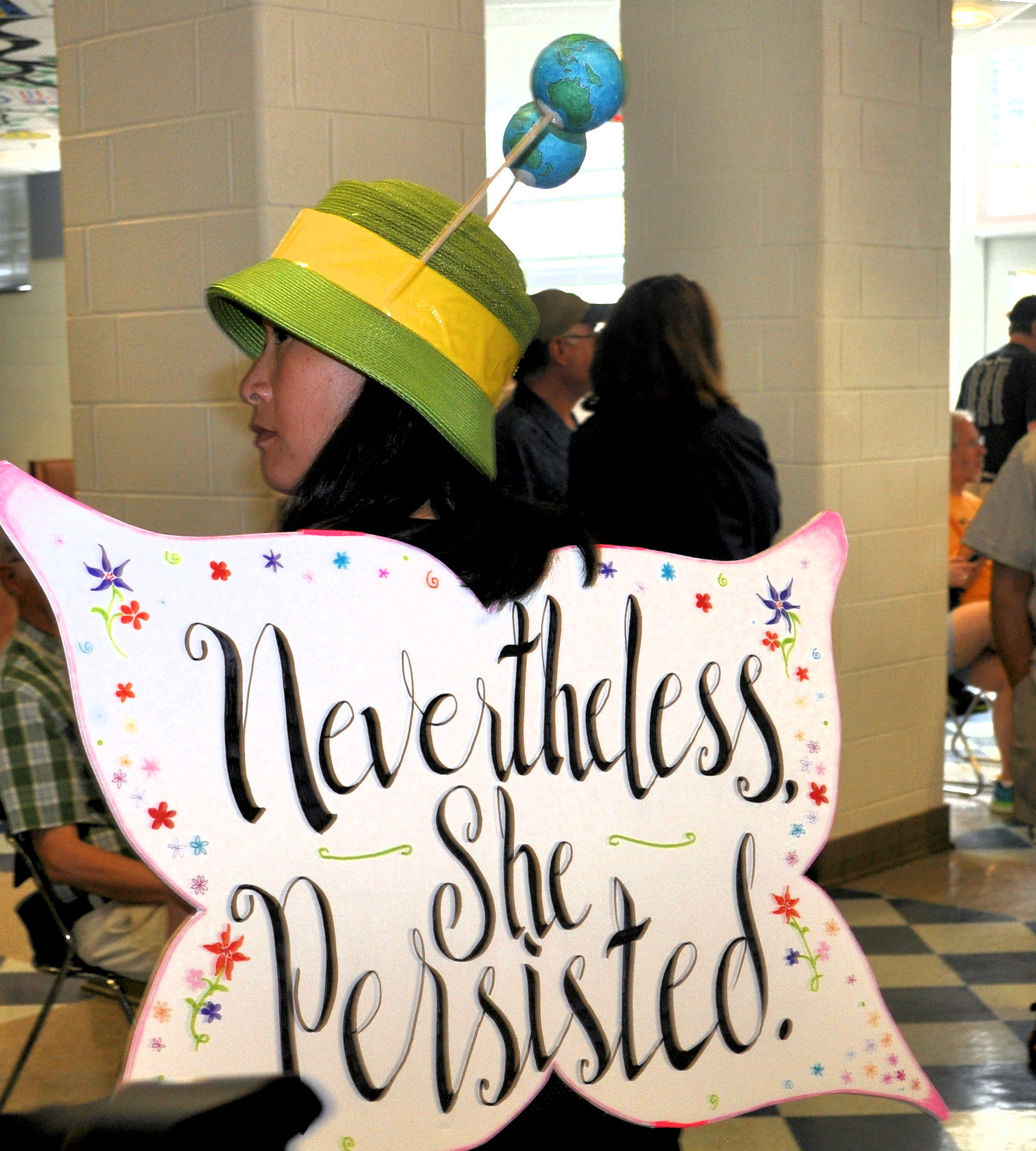
People's Climate March (2017)

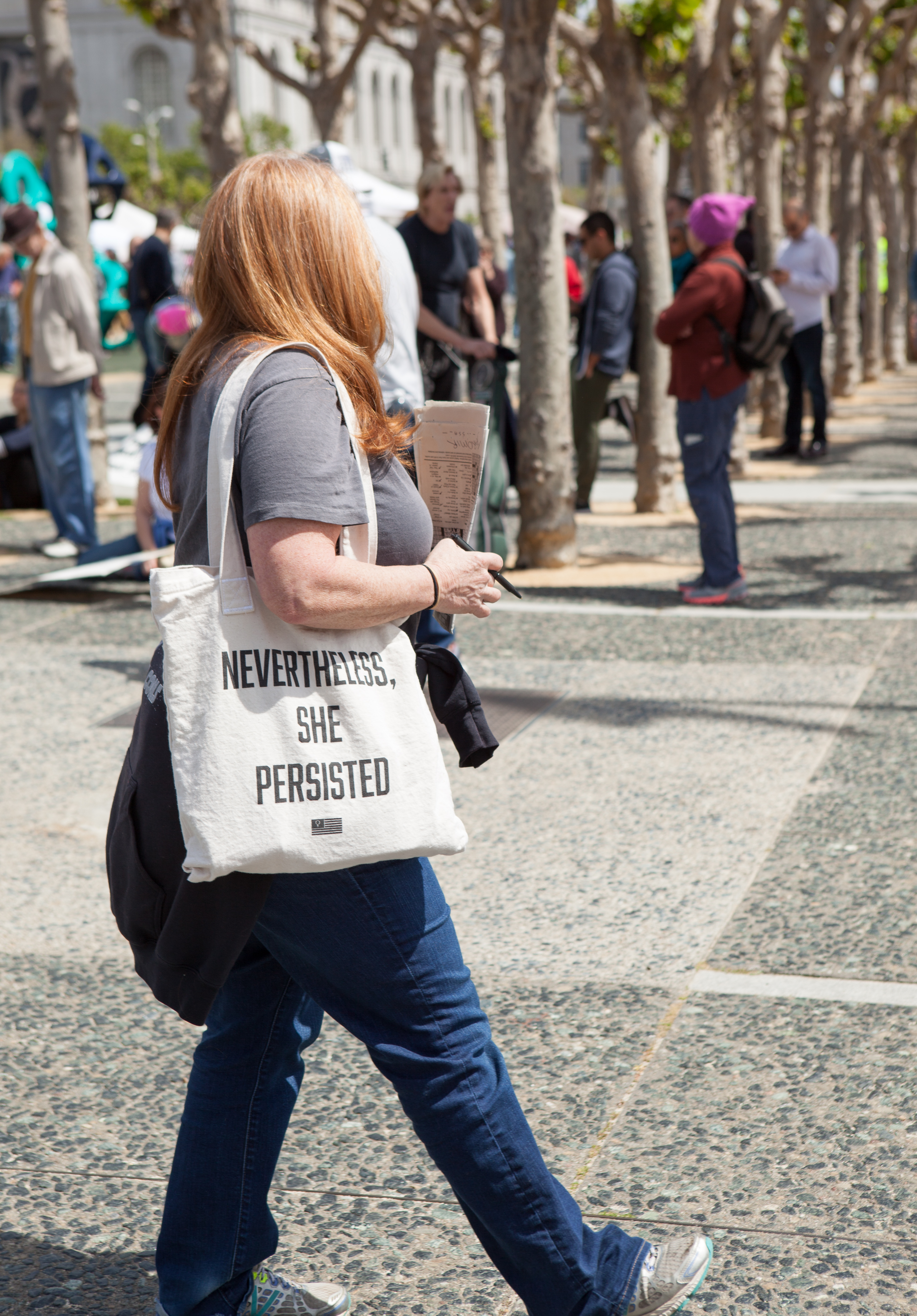
Tax March attendee in San Francisco carrying a tote bag displaying the phrase

Some observers posited non-political reasons for the meme's proliferation. According to Daniel Victor of The New York Times, "A broader theme—that women are too commonly shushed or ignored—emerged on social media." Victor also noted that "a man silencing a woman struck some as all too common", and "rang familiar with many women who had their own stories of being silenced." The Atlantic's Megan Garber wrote, "American culture tells women to be quiet—many ways they are reminded that they would really be so much more pleasing if they would just smile a little more, or talk a little less, or work a little harder to be pliant and agreeable." Further, she wrote, when Senator Warren was silenced, "many women, regardless of their politics or place ... felt that silencing, viscerally ... Because, regardless of their politics or place, those women have heard the same thing, or a version of it, many times before."

Heidi Stevens of the Chicago Tribune commented, "Three little words that women can draw on for decades to come, when something needs to be said and, darn it, we plan to say it. When we're being talked over in meetings. When we're fighting to be heard in male-dominated fields. When we're standing up for our values. When we're doing valuable work and people reduce us to our appearance."

Valerie Schultz wrote in America: the Jesuit Review of Faith & Culture, "It is a phrase we women embrace because persistence is what we do." After describing stories of persistent women from the Gospels, she concluded:

We women persist. Isn't that our job? Throughout history, we have persisted in our quest for respect, for justice, for equal rights, for suffrage, for education, for enfranchisement, for recognition, for making our voices heard. In the face of violence, of opposition, of ridicule, of belittlement, even of jail time, nevertheless, we have persisted.

— Valerie Schultz, America: The Jesuit Review of Faith & Culture

== Cultural references ==
- In March 2017, Chelsea Clinton announced she had written a picture book for children about 13 inspirational American women, titled She Persisted. Clinton's book was adapted into a musical by playwright Adam Tobin and composer Deborah Wicks La Puma that premiered at Bay Area Children's Theatre in February 2019. An Off Broadway production premiered at the Atlantic Theater Company in February 2020.
- In the Agents of S.H.I.E.L.D. season 4 episode "No Regrets" (aired April 18, 2017), the Doctor, Leo Fitz's dark alter-ego in the Framework, reported that a woman was being tortured but had stayed true to her cause, saying "Beaten within an inch of her life ... nevertheless, she persisted."
- The second-season finale of Supergirl (aired May 22, 2017) is titled "Nevertheless, She Persisted".
- In July 2017, independent Abraham Lincoln researcher Kerry Ellard published a blog article entitled Mary Todd Lincoln's Fight For Her Pension, in which the Introduction section was entitled "Nevertheless, She Persisted".
- An ebook anthology called Nevertheless, She Persisted was released by the Book View Café cooperative in August 2017. The anthology contains stories of female empowerment.
- The comic Doonesbury for Sunday, March 3, 2019, makes a reference to the incident.
- In 2019, the English National Ballet, based in London premiered a new program of works all created by women entitled She Persisted.
- In 2021, Applause Theatre Books, a division of Rowman and Littlefield, published She Persisted: Thirty Ten-Minute Plays by Women over Forty and She Persisted: One Hundred Monologues from Plays by Women over Forty, anthologies of theater writings by members of "Honor Roll!", an advocacy group of women playwrights over forty.
- In 2021, Laura Hankin published a fiction book named "A Special Place for Women" about an exclusive, women-only social club named Nevertheless.

== See also ==
- List of United States political catchphrases
