= Standing Rules of the United States Senate, Rule XIX =

U.S. Senate rules on floor debates

Rule XIX of the Standing Rules of the United States Senate, established by the Senate Committee on Rules and Administration, governs the subject of debate on the Senate floor. The Rules, including Rule XIX, were last updated in 2013.

== Content ==
Section 1 of the rule establishes that in order to address the Senate, Senators must stand and be recognized by the Presiding Officer. After recognition, a Senator may not be interrupted by another Senator during debate, although another Senator may stand and address the Presiding Officer in order to speak. Senators also may not speak more than twice on one issue in a legislative day and must keep their debate relevant to the topic at hand. All of these items may be waived by vote of the full Senate.

Sections 2 and 3 state that a Senator shall not impute to another Senator "by any form of words" any conduct or motive that is unworthy or unbecoming of a Senator and shall not speak offensively toward a U.S. state.

Sections 4 and 5 outline what happens if a Senator is found in violation of this rule, including how a Senator can appeal a ruling against him or her.

Sections 6 and 7 empower the Presiding Officer to maintain order in the chamber's galleries and disallows Senators from bringing to attention anything or anyone in the galleries. Section 7 cannot be suspended, even by unanimous consent of the Senate.

Section 8 grants former Presidents the right to address the Senate after proper notice has been given to the Presiding Officer.

== Origin ==
Rule XIX originated from a fistfight that occurred in the 57th United States Congress between South Carolina senators John McLaurin and Ben Tillman on February 22, 1902. Tillman, the senior senator and former governor of South Carolina, had helped to foster McLaurin's career. Although both senators were Democrats, McLaurin had shifted positions to support the Republican-led Congress and White House on the controversial annexation of the Philippines, enraging Tillman. Tillman took the opportunity to lecture the absent McLaurin during a debate about the Philippines on the Senate floor on February 22, 1902, saying that McLaurin had succumbed to "improper influences" by changing his position on the treaty to support the Republican stance in return for political favors. When McLaurin learned about the speech, he rushed to the Senate chambers and declared that Tillman was guilty of "a willful, malicious, and deliberate lie."

Tillman responded by punching McLaurin in the jaw. According to Senate history, "efforts to separate the two combatants resulted in misdirected punches landing on other members." It was the first recorded physical altercation on the floor when the Senate was in session, since Senator Thomas Hart Benton (D-MO) was nearly shot by Henry S. Foote (D-MS) in 1850. However, in 1856, Representative Preston Brooks (D-SC) severely beat Senator Charles Sumner (R-MA) on the Senate floor after a session had ended.

After being separated, during a two-hour debate, both Tillman and McLaurin were declared in contempt of the Senate and not allowed to speak, but upon being asked by another Senator to permit them to speak, both apologized to their colleagues in such rancorous language that they nearly came to blows again. The Senate censured Tillman and McLaurin on February 28, 1902, by a vote of 54 to 12 and later, on August 8, 1902, added what is now Sections 2 and 3 of Rule 19.

== Notable uses ==
Two Senate roll call votes were recorded on January 29, 1915, and April 21, 1952, in which a Senator had asked to be allowed to continue speaking after being reprimanded as outlined in Section 4 of Rule 19. However, "senators tend to let things go" in response to personal attacks and the invocation of Rule 19 is rare in the Senate, noted Gregory Koger, a University of Miami political scientist.

During a debate on June 25, 1979, regarding an amendment that would remove $13 million from the Economic Development Revolving Fund, which would in turn jeopardize a loan guarantee for a new mill for Wheeling-Pittsburgh Steel, Senator Lowell Weicker (R-CT) said of Senator John Heinz (R-PA) "When a member substitutes innuendo for fact or the persuasion of logic, he is either an idiot or devious, and the senator from Pennsylvania qualifies in both ways." Heinz responded by storming to the front of the Senate with a rule book to invoke Rule 19. The presiding officer ordered Weicker to sit down and stop talking, halting debate on the amendment until Majority Leader Robert Byrd brokered a truce in which Weicker retracted his remarks and shook hands with Heinz.

Sen. McConnell Invokes Rule XIX against Sen. Warren (video)

Senate Majority Leader Mitch McConnell (R-KY) invoked Rule XIX on February 7, 2017, against Senator Elizabeth Warren (D-MA) during a debate on the nomination of Senator Jeff Sessions (R-AL) to be Attorney General. Specifically, Senator McConnell claimed that Senator Warren "impugned the motives and conduct of our colleague from Alabama [Senator Sessions]" by reading historical public statements opposing the 1986 nomination of then-U.S. Attorney Sessions for a federal judge position, written by Coretta Scott King and Senator Ted Kennedy. After a party-line vote of the whole Senate, the Republicans ordered Warren to sit down and not take part in the rest of the debate. The move attracted widespread attention, far more than Warren's original speech had been expected to, and popularized the phrase "Nevertheless, she persisted" as an expression adopted by the feminist movement. A number of Warren's Senate Democratic colleagues repeated her remarks and quotations over the following day without formal objection from Republicans.
