= World Heritage Maker =

Rendering program

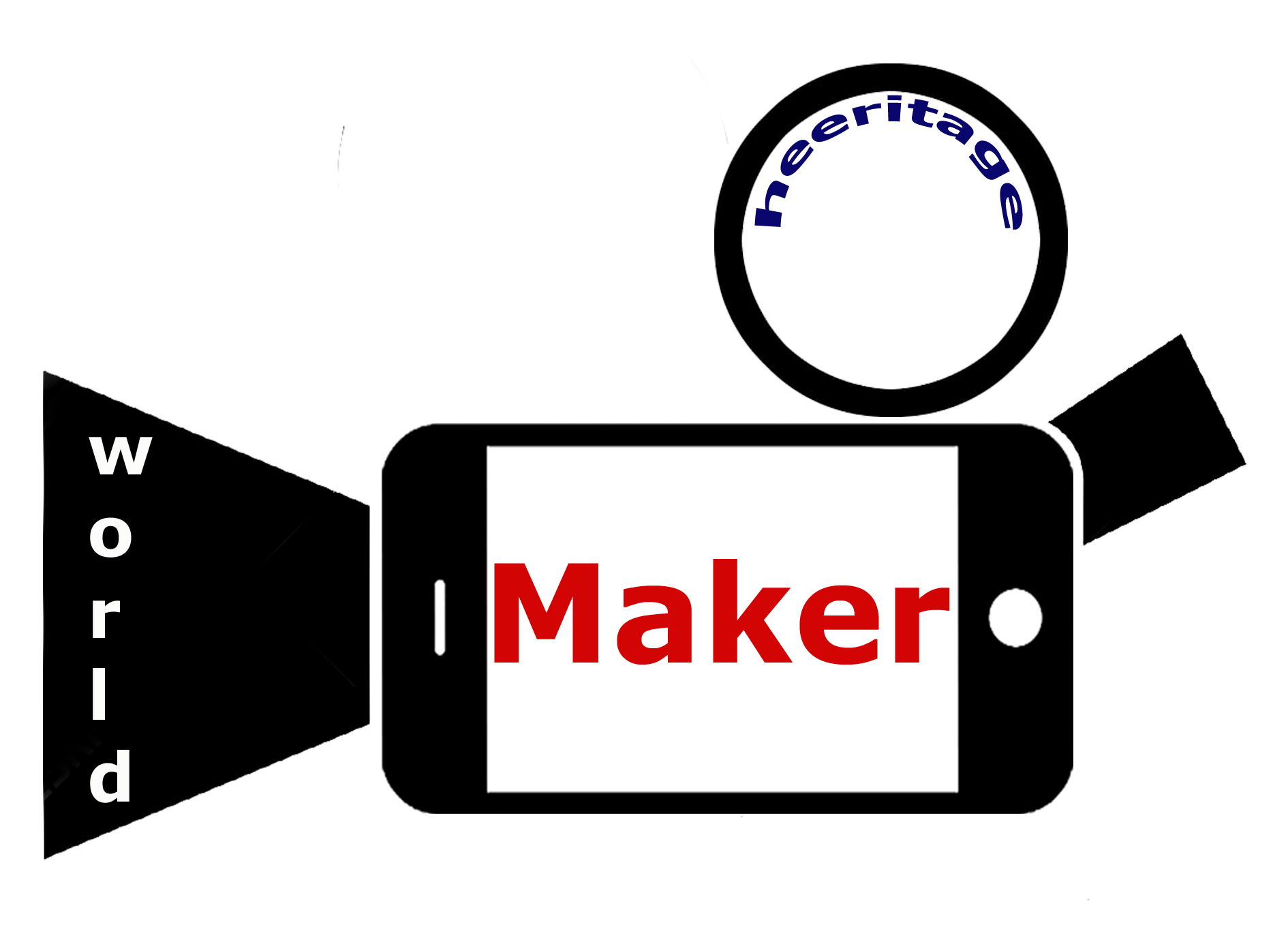
World Heritage Maker Logo

World Heritage Maker (WHM) 1.0 is a rendering program for mobile applications using augmented reality technology. It is developed by the Institute for Virtual Culture (Bulgarian: Институт за виртуална култура]), a Bulgarian company based in Sofia, Bulgaria, established in 2013. WHM is used in science and cultural presentation, entertainment and commercial industries such as high level scientific visualization, museums, galleries, print materials, open air cultural monuments, historical places, natural landscape, industrial design, product design, architecture and more. The company chief is Jordan Detev. In the public sector, the Institute works in favor of the International Foundation for Bulgarian Heritage "Prof. P. Detev"

== Overview ==
WHM 1.0 is a rendering engine that requires a database consisting of images and their virtual replicas as video, animation, multimedia or other 2D or 3D objects. The software uses the Vuforia database. The program interface enables automatic startup (after image recognition) or with the play/stop button; make transparency background (via alpha channel, blue or green), set up the angle at which the video to "save yourself" sitting in relation to the image, depending on whether the so-called print markers are positioned horizontally (as in all printed products) or at another angle for external entities to vertically mounted panels, posters, etc.

Academic and stand-alone versions of WHM are also available. In the first version uses Vuforia system for image recognition (print markers or real images). After the lineup, WHM returns the virtual answer - other images, animations (2D and 3D), video or multimedia (online, if you have a Wi-Fi connection or offline). Software enables automatic start up (after image recognition) or with the play/stop button; you can make transparency background (via alpha channel, blue or green - important in 3D modeling); can to set the angle at which the video to "save yourself" sitting in relation to the image, depending on whether the so-called print markers are positioned horizontally (as in all printed products) or at another angle for external entities to vertically mounted panels, posters, etc. If an added 3D image or animation, the choice of angle positioning of the ratio between horizontal and vertical object virtual comment creates a very interesting effect. A new option allows the creation of Interactive AR application with Multiscreen mode.

== How WHM works ==
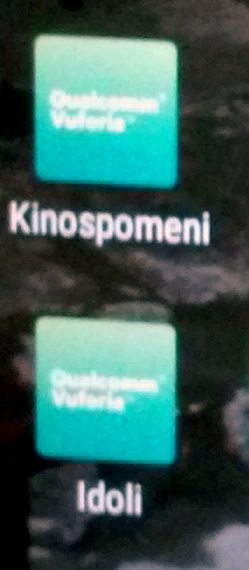
Icon of WHM appls

In this version the program recognizes up to 100 images, which can be attached virtual response (video, animation, etc.). On the display of the mobile device will appear identical icons which will differ only in name. Enabling them will load the home page of the application under which the wait button "start". Activated, he places the back camera on the mobile device. When she gets on the previously saved in memory, illustration, the virtual reality will be triggered, made with any of the following design techniques. It will to add narration, clarify, add useful or entertaining content to the recognized object or entity.
