= Persons Day =

Canadian commemoration of court case declaring women are persons

Persons Day is an annual celebration in Canada, held on October 18. The day commemorates the case of Edwards v. Canada (Attorney General), more commonly known as The Persons Case – a famous Canadian constitutional case decided on October 18, 1929, by the British Judicial Committee of the Privy Council, which at that time was the court of last resort for Canada. The Persons Case held that women were eligible to sit in the Senate of Canada.

While not a civic holiday, several women's groups across Canada make significant note of the day, including The Women's Legal Education and Action Fund.

== History ==
In the 1900s, social change in the Canadian west — including, as at Alberta, a shift from a rural to urban population — came to result in alcohol abuse and prostitution. Some women considered this to be the result of the outnumbering of women by men, and were motivated to improve the state of their society through involvement in politics. In 1916, Alberta passed legislation granting women the right to vote. However, the use of the word 'person' in the federal act was considered by some to mean that the act was indicating that only a man could be a person; the word 'persons' was employed to indicate more than one person, but when talking about one person the pronoun was 'he'. This was seen as preventing women from full participation in politics or affairs of state.

== The Famous Five ==
Persons Day originated with The Famous Five: Emily Murphy, Nellie McClung, Irene Parlby, Louise McKinney and Henrietta Muir Edwards. Emily Murphy, who led the case in 1927, was the first woman in the British Empire to be appointed magistrate in 1916. McClung was the first woman on the CBC Board of Governors and a representative to the League of Nations. McKinney was the first woman sworn into the Alberta Legislature and in the British Empire. Parlby, who was also in the Alberta Legislature, helped pass 18 bills, which helped women and children, and was also the second female cabinet minister in the British Empire. Edwards was known for working for prison reform, and as one of the founders of the National Council of Women in 1890.

== Persons Case ==
In the Persons Case of 1927, Murphy, McClung, Parlby, McKinney and Edward questioned the Supreme Court of Canada regarding women not being included in the word 'person' according to the B.N.A. Act. After five weeks of debate, the court ruled that the word 'person' would continue to exclude women. The five women then went to London, to the Judicial Committee of the Privy Council of Great Britain, this being the highest level of court appeal possible at the time. On October 18, 1929, the Lord Chancellor of Great Britain, Lord Sankey, announced that the court's decision was that the word 'person' would include women:

"The exclusion of women from all public offices is a relic of days more barbarous than ours. And to those who would ask why the word "person" should include females, the obvious answer is, why should it not?"

In 1979, on the 50th anniversary of the Privy Council's decision, the Canadian government instituted the Governor General's Awards in Commemoration of the Persons Case to recognize outstanding contributions in advancing equality for women in Canada. The Awards are presented at a ceremony each Persons Day. People can be nominated annually to receive honours for their contributions to gender equality.

== See also ==
- Edwards v Canada (AG)
- The Famous Five (Canada)
- Feminism in Canada
- Women's History Month
