= Legislative calendar =

A legislative calendar is used by legislatures in the United States to plan their business during the legislative session.

== Calendar ==
Typically, one of the first items mentioned on the calendar is passing the bill enacting procedures and deadlines for the session. Time may also be allotted for considering the budget bill, which is usually the major item of business in a session. The calendar may provide scheduled committee hearings and generally includes many important deadlines.

For instance, California has a fiscal deadline, which is the date on the legislative calendar by which all bills with fiscal effect must have been taken up in a policy Committee and referred to a fiscal Committee; any fiscal bill missing the deadline is considered "dead" unless it receives a rule waiver allowing further consideration.

Some legislatures have a "crossover day," which is the point in the session after which each house only considers legislation sent to it by the other house. In the U.S. Congress, the phrase "placed on calendar" accompanies a bill that is pending before committees of either house; the bill is assigned a calendar number, which determines when it will be considered by that house.

The term "legislative calendar" can also refer to the final published compilation of the action on each instrument during a legislative session. It can also refer to a list of legislation available to be heard by the Legislature.

== Legislative day ==
On a legislative calendar, a "legislative day" is a day on which the Legislature actually meets. The Virginia General Assembly has six legislative days per week (Monday through Saturday), probably reflecting the desire to have a citizen legislature that accomplishes its business in a relatively short, intense annual session, after which the members return to their full-time employment. The Oklahoma legislature, by contrast, has four legislative days per week.

The United States Senate has defined a legislative day as a "'day' that starts when the Senate meets after an adjournment and ends when the Senate next adjourns. Hence, a legislative day may extend over several calendar days or even weeks and months," but could also be less than a single calendar day. US House and Senate rules prohibit bills from being considered on the same day that they are introduced. The concept of the legislative day is used to circumvent these requirements by ending one legislative day and starting a new one a few minutes later.

The daily version of the legislative calendar is sometimes called the daily file, agenda or calendar, which lists all the bills that will be considered on a given day.

== See also ==
- Agenda (meeting)
