= Australian Women's History Forum =

Organization based in Australia

The Australian Women's History Forum (AWHF) is an organisation that exists to enhance the understanding of the role of women in the history of Australia.

== Goals ==
Through its web presence and its sponsorship of Women's History Month (WHM), the AWHF aims to:

- recognise and promote awareness of and provide information on the history of women's contribution to Australia;
- provide a focus for activities on women's history through its website, especially in WHM;
- stimulate women's history initiatives across educational and community sectors; and
- encourage institutions and organisations to hold local activities during WHM.

== Women's History Month ==
WHM, which is celebrated each year in March to coincide with International Women's Day, was initiated in 2000 by Helen Leonard, working with the National Women’s Media Centre and the Women's Electoral Lobby.

From 2005 to 2014, each WHM has highlighted a particular area of women's achievement with a different theme celebrated each year. Organisations, institutions and community groups are encouraged to use this theme for their own WHM events through promotional material on the website and are supported by the online calendar where events are listed.

Past themes, such as Racy Women, Musical Belles, and Arm in Arm: Indigenous and non Indigenous Women Working Together, can be explored in the online Gallery.

It was Helen's vision, drive and commitment, supported by the technical expertise of Gillian Pollack, which made the establishment of WHM in Australia possible. After Helen’s untimely death in 2001, a group of committed women have continued and developed the work she had begun. In 2007, the original WHM website was upgraded and renamed the AWHF to indicate a more interactive role with its membership – one which would operate not only in March but throughout the entire year. A Historians Reference Group, which was established to provide specialist advice and support to WHM, has continued in this role since the inception of the AWHF.

== Website ==
The AWHF website is a gateway to online information on women who have shaped Australian history. It is developed as a useful resource for teachers, students, journalists, professional historians, family and local historians, authors, librarians, archivists, curators and collectors. It is an interactive site and it will continue to grow as people add their own histories of not only well known women but also, perhaps more importantly, those thousands of women who have been the unsung trailblazers in our society.

It features a timeline of key events, a who's who list and a list of historic places of significance to in Australian women's history.

WHM websites from 2002 are archived on the Pandora website and can be accessed through the National Library of Australia.

== See also ==
- Women's History Month
- Women's Electoral Lobby
- History of Australia
- International Women's Day
