= Women's History Month =

Observance month

Women's History Month is an annual observance to highlight the contributions of women to events in history and contemporary society. Celebrated during March in the United States, Germany, and Australia, corresponding with International Women's Day on March 8, it is observed during October in Canada, corresponding with the celebration of Persons Day on October 18.

A weeklong observance in Sonoma County, California, in 1978 was subsequently championed by Gerda Lerner and the National Women's History Alliance to be recognized as a national week (1980) and then month (1987) in the United States, spreading internationally after that.

== History ==
=== In Australia ===
Women's History Month was first celebrated in Australia in 2000, initiated by Helen Leonard, convenor of the National Women's Media Centre, working with the Women's Electoral Lobby. The organisation of annual Women's History Month celebrations is incorporated as part of the work of the Australian Women's History Forum.

==== Annual themes ====
Since 2005, the annual celebration of Women's History Month in Australia has centred on a different area of women's achievement. Promotional materials and events are focused around the theme and organisations, institutions and community groups are encouraged to use this theme for their own events. AWHF hosted Women's "History Month Finale: The Great Debate 2014", marking the end of its official commemorations.

- 2013: Finding Founding Mothers
- 2012: Women with a Plan: architects, town planners and landscape architects
- 2011: Women in the Business of Food
- 2009: Parliamentary Women
- 2008: Women with a Mission: Australian women contributing overseas
- 2007: Arm in Arm: Indigenous and non-Indigenous Women Working Together
- 2006: Musical Belles: Women in Music
- 2005: Celebrating Racy Women

=== In Canada ===
Women's History Month was proclaimed in Canada in 1992, where its purpose is to give Canadians "an opportunity to learn about the important contributions of women and girls to our society – and to the quality of our lives today". October was chosen to coincide with the celebration of the anniversary on October 18 of the decision of the court case Edwards v. Canada, more commonly known as the Persons Case, in which it was established that Canadian women were eligible to be appointed senators and in general had the same rights as Canadian men with respect to positions of political power.

=== In Hungary ===
The archaeologists of the Szent István Király Museum (Székesfehérvár) made several Facebook posts in honor of Women's History Month in 2021, the first time in Hungary. Also this year, in the Hungarian National Museum there was an exhibition with a title of "Women in Art" in March.

=== In Russia ===
Since 2017, there is a group of female volunteers (Women's Museum in Moscow) who spend a virtual month of women's history in Russian. Facebook Groups

=== In Ukraine ===
The Gender Museum in Kharkiv hosts events in honor of Women's History Month in Ukrainian.

=== In the United States ===
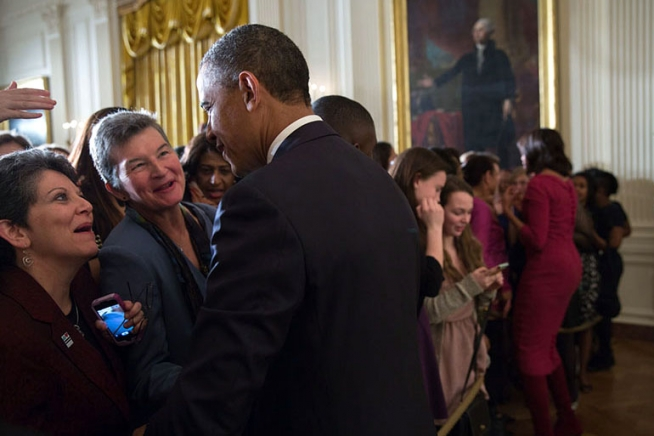
Women's History Month reception in the East Room of the White House on 18 March 2013

Women's History Month started in March 1987.

==== Women's History Week ====
In the United States, Women's History Month traces its beginnings back to the first International Women's Day in 1911. Laura X organized a march in Berkeley, California, on International Women's Day in 1969; International Women's Day had been largely forgotten in the United States before then. The march led to the creation of The Women's History Research Center, a central archive of the women's movement from 1968 to 1974. Laura X also thought it unfair for half the human race to have only one day a year and called for National Women's History Month to be built around International Women's Day. The Women's History Research Center collected nearly one million documents on microfilm, and provided resources and records of the Women's liberation movement that are now available through the National Women's History Alliance, which carried on their ideas, including successfully petitioning Congress to declare March as Women's History Month. In 1978, the school district of Sonoma, California participated in Women's History Week, an event designed around the week of March 8 (International Women's Day). In 1979, a fifteen-day conference about women's history was held at Sarah Lawrence College from July 13 until July 29, chaired by historian Gerda Lerner. It was co-sponsored by Sarah Lawrence College, the Women's Action Alliance, and the Smithsonian Institution. When its participants learned about the success of the Sonoma County's Women's History Week celebration, they decided to initiate similar celebrations within their own organizations, communities, and school districts. They also agreed to support an effort to secure a National Women's History Week.

In February 1980, President Jimmy Carter issued a presidential proclamation declaring the week of March 8, 1980, as National Women's History Week. The proclamation stated, "From the first settlers who came to our shores, from the first American Indian families who befriended them, men and women have worked together to build this nation. Too often the women were unsung and sometimes their contributions went unnoticed. But the achievements, leadership, courage, strength and love of the women who built America was as vital as that of the men whose names we know so well. As Dr. Gerda Lerner has noted, 'Women's History is Women's Right.' It is an essential and indispensable heritage from which we can draw pride, comfort, courage, and long-range vision. I ask my fellow Americans to recognize this heritage with appropriate activities during National Women's History Week, March 2–8, 1980. I urge libraries, schools, and community organizations to focus their observances on the leaders who struggled for equality –Susan B. Anthony, Sojourner Truth, Lucy Stone, Lucretia Mott, Elizabeth Cady Stanton, Harriet Tubman, and Alice Paul. Understanding the true history of our country will help us to comprehend the need for full equality under the law for all our people. This goal can be achieved by ratifying the 27th Amendment to the United States Constitution, which states that 'Equality of Rights under the Law shall not be denied or abridged by the United States or by any state on account of sex.'" Carter was referring to the Equal Rights Amendment, which was never ratified, not to the amendment which did become the 27th Amendment to the United States Constitution after his presidency.

In 1981, responding to the growing popularity of Women's History Week, Sen. Orrin Hatch (R-Utah) and Rep Barbara Mikulski (D-Maryland) co-sponsored the first Joint Congressional Resolution proclaiming a Women's History Week. Congress passed their resolution as Pub. L. 97-28, which authorized and requested the President to proclaim the week beginning March 7, 1982 as "Women's History Week". Throughout the next several years, Congress continued to pass joint resolutions designating a week in March as Women's History Week. Schools across the country also began to have their own local celebrations of Women's History Week and even Women's History Month. By 1986, fourteen states had declared March as Women's History Month.

==== Women's History Month ====
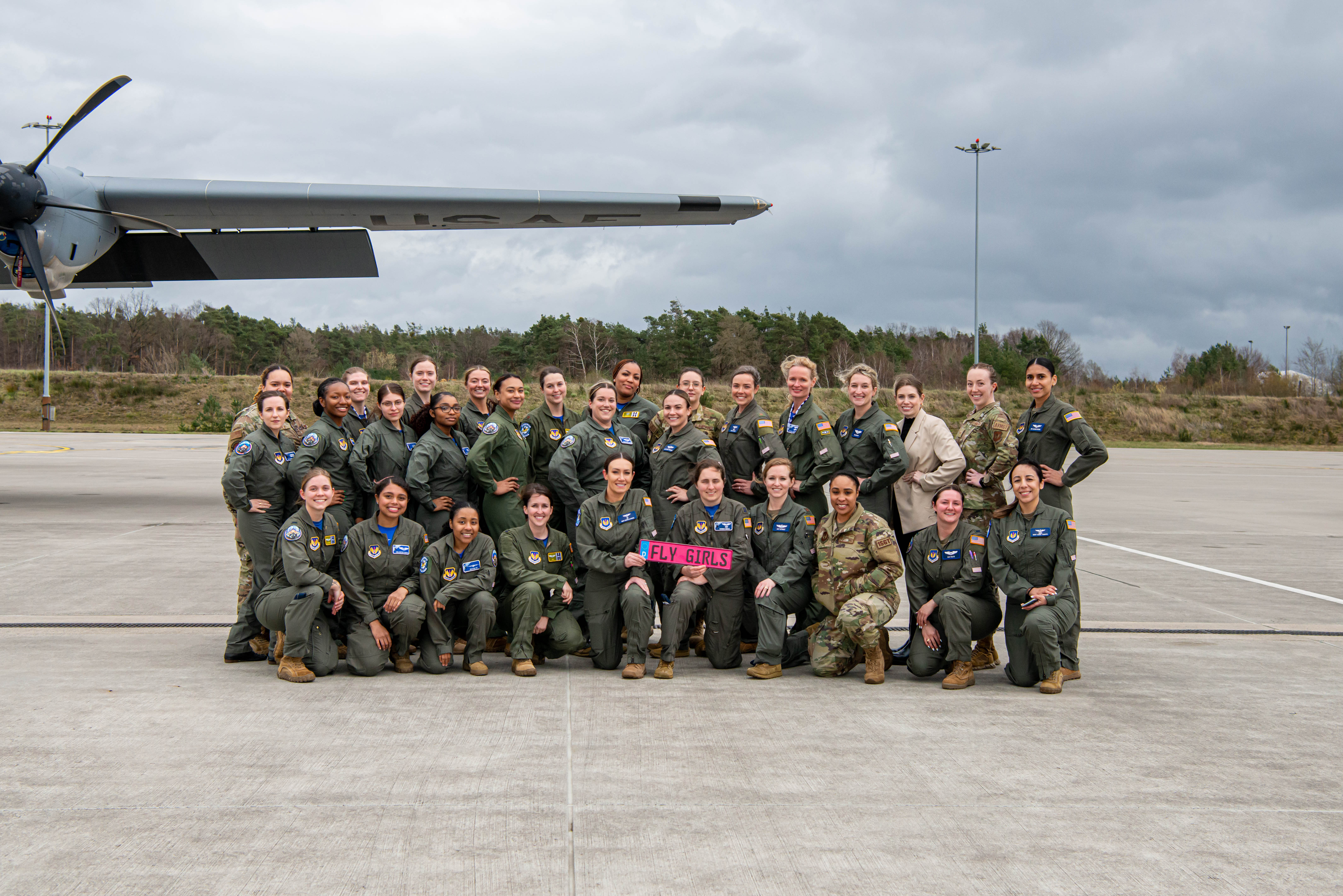
An all-women's flight held to celebrate Women's History Month in 2023. Photo removed online by the Trump administration in 2025.

In 1987, after being petitioned by the National Women's History Project, Congress passed Pub. L. 100-9 which designated the month of March 1987 as Women's History Month. Between 1988 and 1994, Congress passed additional resolutions requesting and authorizing the President to proclaim March of each year as Women's History Month. Since 1988, U.S. presidents have issued annual proclamations designating the month of March as Women's History Month on occasion.

State departments of education also began to encourage celebrations of Women's History Month as a way to promote equality among the sexes in the classroom. Maryland, Pennsylvania, Alaska, New York, Oregon, and other states developed and distributed curriculum materials in all of their public schools, which prompted educational events such as essay contests. Within a few years, thousands of schools and communities began to celebrate of Women's History Month. They planned engaging and stimulating programs about women's roles in history and society, with support and encouragement from governors, city councils, school boards, and the U.S. Congress.

In March 2011, the Obama administration released a report, Women in America: Indicators of Social and Economic Well-Being, showing women's status in the U.S. in 2011 and how it had changed over time. This report was the first comprehensive federal report on women since the report produced by the Commission on the Status of Women in 1963.

Some organizations have issued statements marking Women's History Month, for example the Republican National Committee and the Democratic National Committee.

A President's Commission on the Celebration of Women in History in America recently sponsored hearings in many parts of the country. The Women's Progress Commission will soon conduct hearings to promote interest in preserving areas that are relevant in American women's history. Some of the groups promoting this interest are state historical societies, women's organizations, and groups such as the Girl Scouts of the USA.

==== Presidential Proclamations of Women's History Week ====
1980 (scroll down)
1982
1983
1984
1985
1986

==== Presidential Proclamations of Women's History Month ====
1988
1989 and 1990
1991
1992
1993
1994
1995 Archived 2015-09-24 at the Wayback Machine
1996
1997
1998 Archived 2015-06-04 at the Wayback Machine
1999
2000
2001
2002
2003
2004
2005
2006
2007
2008
2009
2010
2011
2012
2013
2014
2015
2016
2017
2018
2019
2020
2021
2022
2023
2024
2025

==== Annual themes of Women's History Month, declared by the National Women's History Alliance ====
- 1987: "Generations of Courage, Compassion, and Conviction"
- 1988: "Reclaiming the Past, Rewriting the Future"
- 1989: "Heritage of Strength and Vision"
- 1990: "Courageous Voices – Echoing in Our Lives" TWomens have to be equal
- 1991: "Nurturing Tradition, Fostering Change"
- 1992: "A Patchwork of Many Lives"
- 1993: "Discover a New World"
- 1994: "In Every Generation, Action Frees Our Dreams"
- 1995: "Promises to Keep"
- 1996: "See History in a New Way"
- 1997: "A Fine and Long Tradition of Community Leadership"
- 1998: "Living the Legacy"
- 1999: "Women Putting Our Stamp on America"
- 2000: "An Extraordinary Century for Women 1900–2000"
- 2001: "Celebrating Women of Courage and Vision"
- 2002: "Women Sustaining the American Spirit"
- 2003: "Women Pioneering the Future"
- 2004: "Women Inspiring Hope and Possibility"
- 2005: "Women Change America"
- 2006: "Women, Builders of Communities and Dreams"
- 2007: "Generations of Women Moving History Forward"
- 2008: "Women's Art Women's Vision"
- 2009: "Women Taking the Lead to Save Our Planet"
- 2010: "Writing Women Back into History"
- 2011: "Our History is Our Strength"
- 2012: "Women's Education – Women's Empowerment"
- 2013: "Women Inspiring Innovation Through Imagination:Celebrating Women in Science, Technology, Engineering and Mathematics"
- 2014: "Celebrating Women of Character, Courage, and Commitment"
- 2015: "Weaving the Stories of Women's Lives"
- 2016: "Working to Form a More Perfect Union: Honoring Women in Public Service and Government"
- 2017: "Honoring Trailblazing Women in Labor and Business"
- 2018: "Nevertheless, She Persisted: Honoring Women Who Fight All Forms of Discrimination against Women", referring to Mitch McConnell's "Nevertheless, she persisted" remark about Elizabeth Warren.
- 2019: "Visionary Women: Champions of Peace & Nonviolence"Home
- 2020: "Valiant Women of the Vote", marking the Women's Suffrage Centennial
- 2021: "Valiant Women of the Vote: Refusing to Be Silenced", continuing previous year's theme due to the COVID-19 pandemic
- 2022: "Women Providing Healing, Promoting Hope"
- 2023: "Celebrating Women Who Tell Our Stories"
- 2024: "Women Who Advocate for Equity, Diversity & Inclusion"
- 2025: "Moving Forward Together! Women Educating & Inspiring Generations"
- 2026: "Leading the Change: Women Shaping A Sustainable Future"
